= August 1968 =

Month of 1968

| << | August 1968 | | | | | >> |
| Su | Mo | Tu | We | Th | Fr | Sa |
| | | | | 1 | 2 | 3 |
| 4 | 5 | 6 | 7 | 8 | 9 | 10 |
| 11 | 12 | 13 | 14 | 15 | 16 | 17 |
| 18 | 19 | 20 | 21 | 22 | 23 | 24 |
| 25 | 26 | 27 | 28 | 29 | 30 | 31 |

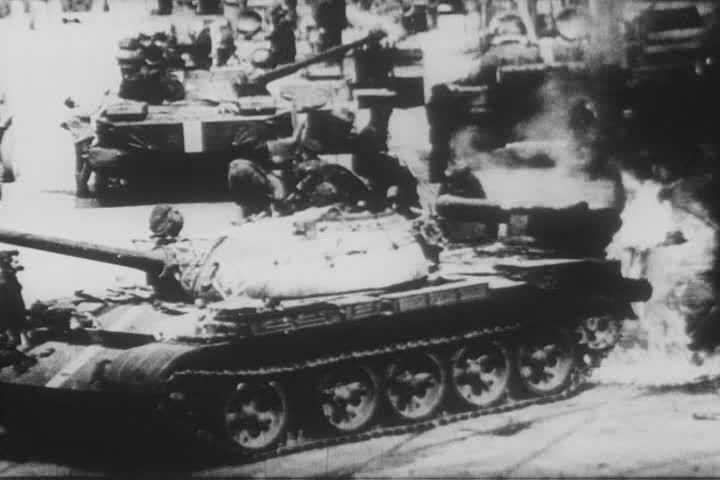
August 20–21, 1968: Soviet Union and 750,000 Warsaw Pact troops invade Czechoslovakia

The following events occurred in August 1968:

== August 1, 1968 (Thursday) ==
- A court in Caracas sentenced former Venezuelan dictator Marcos Perez Jimenez to "four years, one month and 15 days imprisonment" after he was found guilty of embezzlement of government funds between 1948 and 1958. Since the time "corresponded exactly" to the amount of time Jimenez had been held in an American jail in Miami since 1964, the court gave Perez credit for time served and released him immediately, on the condition that he leave Venezuela. Perez then went into exile in Spain, staying at a luxury residential hotel in Madrid.
- The National Football League made its first test of the "pressure point", allowing the kicking of a point after touchdown in the 23 preseason exhibition games between NFL and American Football League teams. Running or passing the ball, good for two points in AFL games, was worth one point. Sid Blanks of the AFL's Houston Oilers tried and failed to score the pressure point after the lone touchdown in a 9–3 win over the visiting Washington Redskins, in what was also the first professional football game in a domed stadium. Tom Matte of the Baltimore Colts would score the first pressure point two days later in a 14–12 win over the Oakland Raiders.
- The Federal National Mortgage Association, nicknamed "Fannie Mae" since its creation in 1938 as a United States government means of providing security to mortgage lenders, was made a publicly traded private corporation, and many of its functions of providing insurance against default for purchasers of Federal Housing Administration and Veterans Administration were assumed with the creation of the Government National Mortgage Association ("Ginnie Mae").
- Three weeks after his 22nd birthday, Hassanal Bolkiah was crowned as the 29th Sultan of Brunei in a coronation ceremony that took place ten months after his assumption of the throne following the abdication of his father on October 5, 1967.
- The U.S. National Flood Insurance Program was established as an alternative to federal disaster relief by providing a means for homeowners in flood-prone areas to pay premiums in order to purchase insurance against flooding.
- The first issue of Weekly Shōnen Jump was published in Japan for the first time. Since its debut, the magazine has sold over 7.5 billion copies, making it the best-selling comic/manga magazine in history.
- After NASA limited Saturn V rocket production to the model of Vehicle 515, Marshall Space Flight Center terminated production of engine hardware for the Apollo and Apollo Applications programs. The action affected 38 engines made by the same company, with 27 Rocketdyne H-1, eight Rocketdyne F-1, and three Rocketdyne J-2 rocket engines.

Destroy All Monsters was released and was meant to be the last Godzilla movie

== August 2, 1968 (Friday) ==
- Ahmed Sékou Touré, President of Guinea, spoke at the city of Kankan and announced his plans for a West African version of China's Cultural Revolution, with plans "to attack fetishism, charlatanism, religious fanaticism, any irrational attitude, any form of mystification, and any form of exploitation". In order to further instruction in his concept of Socialist Cultural Theory, Touré ordered the creation of Centres d'Education Revolutionnaire to educate the next generation of leaders, and ordered citizens to join Pouvoir Revolutionnaire Locales to force change in towns and villages, as well as monopolizing all media.
- A suicidal pilot stole a Cessna-180 airplane from an airstrip at Jean, Nevada, then flew to Las Vegas and crashed into the top of what was, at the time, the tallest building in the metropolitan area, the 30-story tall Landmark Hotel and Casino in Paradise. The wreckage then fell onto the adjacent Las Vegas Convention Center. The pilot was killed, but nobody on the ground was injured.
- The five-story tall Ruby Towers apartment building, located in the Santa Cruz district of Manila, collapsed during a 7.6 magnitude earthquake that struck the Philippines island of Luzon at 4:21 in the morning, killing 204 people. The quake, with an epicenter at the city of Casiguran, 140 miles (230 km) away, killed 10 people in rural areas outside Manila.
- Colonel Abdallah Salih Sabah al-Awlaqi, the commander of the national security forces of the relatively new People's Republic of Southern Yemen (South Yemen), defected along with 200 of his soldiers to the older Yemen Arab Republic in North Yemen, taking with him most of South Yemen's fleet of armored cars.
- Eighty-two of the 95 people on board Alitalia Airlines Flight 660 survived despite the DC-8's crash into a tree-covered hillside as it was approaching Milan following a flight from Rome.
- Sirhan Sirhan pleaded not guilty to charges of murdering Senator Robert F. Kennedy in June.
- Born:
  - Maximum Capacity (ring name for Michael Stanco), American professional wrestler who weighed 650 pounds (290 kg); in Newark, New Jersey (died from colorectal cancer, 2014)
  - Chrystia Freeland, Deputy Prime Minister of Canada (2019–2024); in Peace River, Alberta
- Died: Melitón Manzanas, 59, Spanish police superintendent and director of the Brigada Político-Social secret police force in San Sebastián, was assassinated by the Basque separatist group, Euskadi Ta Askatasuna (ETA), at his home in Irún.

== August 3, 1968 (Saturday) ==
- The Bratislava Declaration was signed by the leaders of the Communist parties of host nation Czechoslovakia, and neighboring Communist-ruled regimes in the Soviet Union, Bulgaria, Hungary, East Germany and Poland. Officially, the meeting in Czechoslovakia was called the "Declaration of Six Communist and Labor Parties of the Socialist Countries". Specifically, the parties agreed to the Brezhnev doctrine (from Soviet leader Leonid Brezhnev) that the Communist nations should agree on common policies and to "firmly and resolutely set their unbreakable solidarity and their high degree of vigilance against each and every effort by imperialism and also by all other anti-communist forces to weaken the leading role of the working class and the communist parties" and pledging that "They will never allow anyone to drive a wedge between socialist States or to undermine the foundations of the socialist social system." The six nations agreed to work together for "the interests of all fraternal countries and parties, the cause of the unbreakable friendship of the peoples of our countries, and the interests of peace, democracy, national independence, and socialism." The last Soviet Army troops departed from Czechoslovakia on the same day, more than a month after the end of Warsaw Pact military exercises on June 30. Troops would return 17 days later in an invasion of Czechoslovakia.
- During the meeting, five conservative members of the Czechoslovak Communist Party Politburo signed and had delivered a "letter of invitation" that Brezhnev would refer to as the pretext for invasion, but which would not be revealed until almost 24 years later. Vasil Bilak, Alois Indra, Drahomir Kolder, Oldrich Svestka and Antonín Kapek signed the letter, typewritten and written in Russian, that "The very essence of socialism in our country is in danger," and added "In such complex conditions we are addressing you, Soviet Communists... with a plea to provide support and help with all the means available. Take our declaration as an urgent request for your intervention and general help." On July 16, 1992, after the collapse of Communism in Eastern Europe, Russian president Boris Yeltsin would deliver the original letter to Czechoslovakia's president Václav Havel, who would disclose it the next day.
- Born: Rod Beck, American baseball relief pitcher and 1994 award winner; in Burbank, California (d. 2007)
- Died: Marshal Konstantin Rokossovsky, 71, Soviet Army commander and World War II hero

== August 4, 1968 (Sunday) ==
- North Central Airlines Flight 261 was approaching Milwaukee's General Mitchell International Airport on a flight from Chicago when a private plane collided with it. The pilot of the North Central Convair CV-580 turboprop, Captain Ted Baum, was able to land safely in spite of being struck in the side by a Cessna 150. All three people on the Cessna (piloted by a 19-year-old man) were killed.
- North Vietnam rejected yet another United States offer to begin the process to end the Vietnam War when United States negotiator Cyrus Vance met with North Vietnamese delegate Lau in Paris. The formula for mutual de-escalation the North Vietnamese rejected was originally put forward by the Soviet Ambassador to Paris Valerian Zorin.
- In Brazzaville, Alphonse Massamba-Débat, the civilian President of the Republic of the Congo, was forced to cede most of his power to a 40-member National Revolutionary Council led by a rebellious Army officer, Captain Marien Ngouabi. Massamba-Débat would continue for another month as a figurehead, before being forced into exile.
- Born:
  - Lee Mack (stage name for Lee McKillop), English actor and comedian, star of the BBC One sitcom Not Going Out since 2006; in Southport, Lancashire
  - Olga Neuwirth, Austrian classical music composer; in Graz
- Died: Alexander Gettler, 84, American forensic scientist who became an expert on toxicology analysis

== August 5, 1968 (Monday) ==
- Three weeks after the coup d'état that installed him as Iraq's new president, General Ahmed Hassan al-Bakr announced a general amnesty for his nation's Kurdish population, including people who had deserted from the Iraqi army or from police forces, and said that the surrender of their weapons would not be required. The announcement came the day after al-Bakr and the Revolutionary Command Council said that the RCC would implement provisions of a 12-point plan to provide for cultural autonomy and rights to use Kurdish.
- The Republican National Convention opened in Miami Beach, Florida.
- Born:
  - Marine Le Pen, French presidential candidate and runner-up in 2017 and leader of the right-wing Front national; in Neuilly-sur-Seine
  - Colin McRae, Scottish rally auto racer and 1995 world champion; in Lanark (killed in helicopter crash, 2007)
  - Terri Clark, Canadian country music artist known for Girls Lie Too; in Montreal
- Died: Luther Perkins, 40, American country music guitarist for Johnny Cash; two days after being injured in a fire at his home in Hendersonville, Tennessee. Perkins had fallen asleep while smoking a cigarette.

== August 6, 1968 (Tuesday) ==
- The United States Air Force made the first unannounced satellite launch from Cape Kennedy in almost five years, although many local reporters learned about the plan anyway, and were present for the 7:08 a.m. liftoff. Although the secret launch was no secret, the nature of the payload – referred to only as "Agent 817" – remained classified and was thought to be intended to gather intelligence from the Soviet Union and China. The last attempt at a secret launch had been on October 16, 1963; the Associated Press commented, "That shot received such wide publicity that the Pentagon de-classified the project and opened all future launchings to newsmen." In 1990, "Agent 817" would be revealed to have been the first of the USAF's CANYON project of seven spy satellites sent up between 1968 and 1977.
- The United Kingdom submitted a comprehensive proposal at the meeting of the Eighteen Nation Committee on Disarmament in Geneva, that would ultimately become the basis of the 1972 Biological Weapons Convention. The "Working Document on Microbiological Warfare" pointed out six shortcomings of the Geneva Protocol of 1925, including that it was limited to bacteriological and chemical weapons, that it applied only during declarations of war, that it prohibited the use, but not the manufacture of weapons and that it allowed their use against nations that were not party to the agreement.

== August 7, 1968 (Wednesday) ==
- More than 1,000 people drowned in the Gujarat State of India, after heavy rains during the monsoon season caused the Tapti River to overflow its banks. The state capital, Surat, was submerged beneath 10 feet of water for a week. After the floodwaters receded, at least 1,000 more people died in Gujarat state during a cholera epidemic from the contamination of the drinking water. In the years after the flood, the Ukai Dam (which would open in 1972) would be constructed to bring the Tapti's waters under control and to provide hydroelectric power.
- Former U.S. vice president Richard M. Nixon completed a dramatic political comeback by being nominated for president at the Republican National Convention on the first ballot. Needing 667 delegate votes, Nixon clinched the nomination when the roll call reached the 49th of the 50 state delegations and was given all 30 of Wisconsin's votes. He finished with 692. New York governor Nelson A. Rockefeller was second with 287, and California governor Ronald Reagan received 182.
- Nine coal miners were killed in an explosion and subsequent slate fall at Peabody Coal Company's River Queen Mine, near Greenville, Kentucky.

== August 8, 1968 (Thursday) ==
- Maryland governor Spiro Agnew was selected by Richard Nixon to be his choice for vice-presidential running mate. Agnew was nominated on the first ballot, receiving 1,128 of the 1,333 delegate votes, while Michigan governor George Romney, a proposal advanced by some liberal Republican delegates, got 178 votes, and another 27 votes were scattered among several other nominees. Following the roll call, Governor Romney made a successful motion that Agnew's nomination be accepted unanimously by acclamation. Almost a year later, in the publication of The Making of the president, 1968, author Theodore H. White would reveal that Nixon had offered the vice presidential job first to Robert Finch, the incumbent lieutenant governor of California at the time, and that Finch had declined (Nixon, at the time, was a resident of New York).
- East Germany's premier and Communist Party first secretary Walter Ulbricht sent a proposal to his West Germany counterpart, Chancellor Kurt Georg Kiesinger, seeking a summit for economic cooperation between the two German nations. Ulbricht's note was viewed in the west as a signal of "the failure and abandonment" of störfreimachen, a 1960 program to make East Germany independent of West German products. The next day, Ulbricht spoke at the East German parliament, the Volkskammer, and offered to normalize relations with the West.
- Died:
  - Fritz Stiedry, 84, Austrian-born composer and conductor of the Leningrad Philharmonic Orchestra
  - Raphael Demos, 76, Turkish-born American philosopher

== August 9, 1968 (Friday) ==
- All 48 people on British Eagle Flight 802 were killed when the airplane crashed in Langenbruck, West Germany, following the loss of its electrical power supply, uncontrollable stress on the aircraft, and its structural failure. The Viscount turboprop airplane was en route from London to Innsbruck (in Austria). Four years earlier, on February 29, 1964, all 83 people on a flight with the same number, British Eagle International Airlines Flight 802/6, crashed into a mountain on another London to Innsbruck flight. British Eagle would go out of business shortly after the crash of the second Flight 802.
- Yugoslavia's President Josip Broz Tito, a Communist known for not always agreeing with the Soviet Union and the Warsaw Pact, visited Czechoslovakia's prime minister Alexander Dubček and was cheered by tens of thousands of people during his visit to Prague.
- Born:
  - Gillian Anderson, American-born British television and film actress known for playing Dana Scully on The X-Files; in Chicago
  - Eric Bana (stage name for Eric Banadinović), Australian television and film actor; in Melbourne

== August 10, 1968 (Saturday) ==
- The International Convention for the Protection of New Varieties of Plants, signed on December 2, 1961, went into effect after its ratification by just three nations. Referred to as "The UPOV Convention" for its creation of the enforcement agency, the Union internationale pour la Protection des Obtentions Végétales, the treaty gave intellectual property rights to the creators of new strains of existing products through plant breeding.
- The Politburo of the Soviet Union's Communist Party voted to accept a proposal to begin discussions with the United States to limit and reduce the number of offensive and defensive antiballistic missiles (ABMs), though not the nuclear warheads carried by the missiles. The Soviet decision set the way for the signing of the 1972 ABM Treaty.
- Piedmont Airlines Flight 230 crashed short of the runway while approaching Charleston, West Virginia at the end of its flight from Cincinnati, killing 35 of the 37 people aboard.

== August 11, 1968 (Sunday) ==
- A referendum was conducted in the Spanish colony of Equatorial Guinea for approval of a constitution that provided for a republican government. The West African colony comprised the territories of the island of Fernando Pó (now Bioko) and the mainland territory of Río Muni. In voting supervised by United Nations observers, the referendum passed by a 63% to 37% margin (72,458 yes and 41,197 no). Approval by the voters in Río Muni was more significant than on Fernando Pó, where the approval came by just 377 votes (4,763 to 4,486).
- The last steam passenger train service in Britain came to an end. A selection of British Railways steam locomotives made the 120-mile (190 km) journey from Liverpool to Carlisle and back in what is now called the Fifteen Guinea Special. The £15 price of the ride was equivalent at the time to more than US$40 per person, and more than £240 in 2018.
- The Deep Sea Drilling Project began operations as the D/V Glomar Challenger began its first core-drilling operation under the planning of the Joint Oceanographic Institutions for Deep Earth Sampling.
- The Soviet Union, East Germany and Poland began military maneuvers near their nations' borders with Czechoslovakia.
- Born: Noordin Mohammad Top, Malaysian-born Indonesian terrorist; in Kluang (killed by police, 2009)

== August 12, 1968 (Monday) ==
- Israel was able to obtain two intact and fully working MiG-17 jet fighters, after two Syrian Air Force pilots mistook an airstrip at Betzet in Israel for a runway in Latakia in southern Lebanon . Lieutenant Walid Adham and 2nd Lieutenant Radfan Rifai came in for a landing, and climbed out, then were stunned when local residents told them that they were on Israeli territory. The Israeli Air Force was soon able to use the two MiG-17s for training missions in maneuvers against its own Shahak 32 jet fighters, and discovered that the MiG-17 could outmaneuver the Israeli fighter jets at low altitudes. Within a year, Israel was able to regain an advantage over the fighter jets of its neighboring enemies.
- At Nanning, the capital of China's Guangxi Province, political leaders began a seven-week public "Beast and Fowl Exhibit" of Chinese citizens who were branded as enemies of the Cultural Revolution. The prisoners were tied up, placed in a wooden cage for display, and made to wear signs that identified what they were accused of, including treason, espionage, war crimes, or membership in the fictitious "Anti-Communist Party Patriotic Army". Over a period of 52 days, almost half a million (489,365) spectators filed through the Chinese Red Army military headquarters for a "Class-Struggle Education" presentation.

== August 13, 1968 (Tuesday) ==
- Greece's prime minister and dictator, Georgios Papadopoulos, escaped an assassination attempt when a bomb exploded while his car was still 45 feet (14 m) away. Papadopoulos was on his way back to Athens after a stay at his summer villa in Lagonisi. Former Greek Navy Lieutenant Alexandros Panagoulis, who had been part of an underwater demolition team, misjudged the speed of the premier's car, and detonated the explosive just as the vehicle was entering a tunnel. Panagoulis was caught by police while trying to run toward a getaway motorboat which had been unable to reach the shore due to the sea being crowded with swimmers; the boat sped away and was the subject of a massive search. During the next 24 hours, Greek security police arrested more than 100 people suspected as being part of the conspiracy, including three retired Greek officers, air force major general Elias Deros, army brigadier general Ioannides Koumanakos, and Navy Captain Constantine Loundras. Panagoulis would spend five years in Greek prisons before being exiled in 1973. After the overthrow of Papadopoulos in 1974, Panagoulis would be elected to parliament, but would be killed in an automobile accident in 1976.
- An unprecedented number of students and protesters marched to the Zócalo, the main square in Mexico City, to protest against Mexico's president, Gustavo Diaz Ordaz. At 5:00 in the afternoon, a crowd of 50,000 students, professors and supporters started from the university campus of the Instituto Politécnico Nacional and began the 8-mile (13 km) walk to the capital. By the time they reached the city center, their number had increased to 150,000. The demonstration remained peaceful, and the police did not intervene, despite the traffic jams created by the protests. An even larger demonstration would take place two weeks later.
- East Germany's Communist Party leader, Walter Ulbricht, arrived in Czechoslovakia as the guest of Alexander Dubček, and the two leaders conferred at the resort town of Karlovy Vary. Ulbricht was unsuccessful in his last attempt to convince the Czechoslovak leaders to reverse their attempts to introduce "socialism with a human face".
- Born: Masaneh Kinteh, Gambian military officer and commander of the Gambian Armed Forces from 2009 to 2012 and again from 2017 to 2020; in Sankwia, Jarra West, the Gambia
- Died: Rene d'Harnoncourt, 67, who had retired six weeks earlier from being Director of the Museum of Modern Art in New York City, was struck and killed by a drunk driver while walking along the side of a road in New Suffolk, New York.

== August 14, 1968 (Wednesday) ==
- All 21 people on a Los Angeles Airways helicopter were killed when the Sikorsky S61 broke apart while flying the group of vacationers from the Los Angeles International Airport to Disneyland. The wreckage fell onto a playground at Lueder's Park in Compton. One of the victims was the teenage grandson of the L.A. Airways shuttle director. Moments before the crash, a group of children who had been playing at the site had been led to safety by a 14-year-old National Youth Corps volunteer. The crash was the second in less than three months for the Disneyland shuttle service; 23 people had been killed on May 22.
- Born:
  - Jason Leonard, English-born president of the Rugby Football Union and forward for the England national team from 1990 to 2004; in Barking
  - Catherine Bell, English-born American television actress and co-star of the TV series JAG; in London
  - Darren Clarke, Northern Irish professional golfer and 2011 British Open champion; in Dungannon

== August 15, 1968 (Thursday) ==
- A 7.4 magnitude earthquake in Indonesia's Gulf of Tomini struck at 6:14 in the morning (2214 August 14 UTC) and triggered a tsunami that killed more than 200 people on the island of Sulawesi, formerly the Celebes.
- WHK-FM, a Cleveland radio station that had rebroadcast pop music from WHK (AM), changed its format to progressive rock, and began its broadcast day with DJs playing what the station referred to as "The New Groove", and would go on to become one of the most popular and influential FM radio stations in the nation as WMMS.
- Born: Debra Messing, American TV and film actress and co-star of Will & Grace; in Brooklyn

== August 16, 1968 (Friday) ==
- In one of his last official acts as Prime Minister of Portugal and dictator of the Iberian nation, António de Oliveira Salazar fired seven of his 15 cabinet ministers, including his longtime Interior Minister and head of law enforcement, Alfredo Dos Santos. Salazar, who would suffer a fatal stroke less than three weeks later, also dismissed his Finance Minister, the ministers for the Portuguese Army and the Portuguese Navy, the Health Minister, the Education Minister and the Communications Minister.
- The United States launched two different multiple warhead missile systems on the same day, firing (for the first time) a UGM-73 Poseidon (capable of carrying 10 separately targeted warheads) from a surface ship, the USNS Observation Island, followed a few hours later by a Minuteman 3 (which could carry 3 warheads) from a U.S. Air Force missile silo.
- Romania's President and Communist Party leader, Nicolae Ceaușescu, signed a 20-year "treaty of friendship, cooperation and mutual assistance" with Czechoslovak president Ludvík Svoboda at a meeting in Prague.

== August 17, 1968 (Saturday) ==
- Meeting in a closed session, the 170 members of the Soviet Communist Party's Central Committee decided "by a narrow majority" to authorize the invasion of Czechoslovakia. The decision to intervene in the domestic affairs of another Communist nation would be described later by historian Mary Heimann as "a decision that was to return to haunt subsequent Soviet administrations." The Party's Politburo then approved the Central Committee decision unanimously.
- Hungary's Communist leader, János Kádár, visited Prague and met with Czechoslovak party leader Alexander Dubček, "presumably with the consent of the Kremlin". According to one account, Kadar, who had been brought to power by the Soviet invasion of his country in 1956 and who was aware that an invasion of Czechoslovakia was likely, asked Dubček, "Do you really not know the kind of people who you are dealing with?"
- The third and final phase of the Tet Offensive— Phase III— began with a massive attack by the North Vietnamese Army and the Viet Cong on 27 South Vietnamese cities and towns, as well as 47 airfields and 100 outposts. The fighting would continue for more than six weeks, finally ending on September 28.
- Czechoslovak Premier Oldřich Černík told an Austrian television interviewer that his nation was considering loans from the World Bank and from other foreign banking firms. Unlike aid from the Soviet Union, loans from capitalist nations were not dependent on political preconditions.
- Actress Mia Farrow flew from New York to El Paso, Texas, then went across the border to the neighboring city of Ciudad Juárez in Mexico. Thirty minutes later, she was granted a divorce from singer Frank Sinatra, whom she had married in December.

== August 18, 1968 (Sunday) ==
- In Moscow, the Soviet Union's Leonid Brezhnev convened an emergency meeting with his counterparts from four other Warsaw Pact neighbors of Czechoslovakia, Todor Zhivkov (Bulgaria), Wladyslaw Gomulka (Poland), Walter Ulbricht (East Germany) and János Kádár (Hungary), and read to them the August 3 "invitation letter" handed to him in Bratislava, then discussed and approved Brezhnev's plans for a joint military invasion.
- U.S. president Lyndon Johnson informed Presidential hopefuls Richard Nixon and Hubert Humphrey that the North Vietnamese government had refused to allow the Pope to visit Hanoi on a mission of peace. During telephone conversations which were recorded between LBJ, Nixon and Humphrey the decision by Hanoi to deny the Pope's visit was described as yet another example of how little the North Vietnamese wanted peace.
- A landslide killed 104 people after sweeping two charter buses into the rain-swollen Hida River on National Highway Route 41 in Japan. The two vehicles were part of a caravan of 15 buses that were on an early morning trip to Mount Norikura to watch the sunrise.
- All 40 people on a United Arab Airlines (now EgyptAir) flight were killed when the Antonov 24B crashed into the Mediterranean Sea while en route from Cairo to Damascus.
- Ronald Duff, a 19-year-old guitarist for an Irish pop music band, The First Edition (unrelated to a similarly named American band), was electrocuted while the band was playing a set for a dance at the ballroom of the Barry Hotel in Dublin. Witnesses said that Duff had hugged his electric guitar to his chest when the instrument short-circuited.

== August 19, 1968 (Monday) ==
- U.S. Air Force Lieutenant General Samuel C. Phillips, Director of NASA's Apollo lunar landing program, announced that it was "clearly possible" for a crewed landing on the Moon to happen in 1969, fulfilling the goal announced by the late President Kennedy in 1962 to land a man on the Moon, and return him to Earth, "before the end of the decade". Speaking in Washington, Lt. Gen. Phillips said that the launch date for the first orbital flight of the Apollo program, Apollo 7, had been set for October 11. Apollo 11 would land on the Moon 11 months and one day after Phillips's announcement.
- President Johnson signed the Wholesome Poultry Act into law, providing for all states to implement minimum standards for inspection of chicken and other poultry products within two years. The law was enacted eight months after the Wholesome Meat Act. Johnson commented that dirty chicken processing plants would have to "clean up or close down".
- Anatoly Dobrynin, the Soviet Union's ambassador to the U.S., informed U.S. secretary of state Dean Rusk that the Soviet Union was ready to negotiate an arms limitation treaty to stop the further production of ballistic and anti-ballistic missiles.
- Died: George Gamow, 64, Ukrainian-born American theoretical physicist and author known for the popular science book for young readers, One Two Three... Infinity

== August 20, 1968 (Tuesday) ==
- At 11:00 p.m. local time (2000 UTC), the Warsaw Pact invasion of Czechoslovakia began as troops and tanks from the Soviet Union, Poland, East Germany, and Hungary came across Czechoslovakia's borders. Bulgarian troops came in from the Soviet side, and Antonov troop and tank carrier airplanes of the 24th Soviet Tactical Air Armyat landed at the airports in Prague, Bratislava, Brno, Kosice, Ostrava, Karlovy Vary, Pardubice, Poprad, and other Czechoslovak cities. The Prague Spring of political liberalization had come to an end as 500,000 Warsaw Pact troops, 6,300 tanks and 550 combat aircraft and 250 transport planes carried out the largest Soviet attack in peacetime and the biggest operation in Europe since World War II had ended.
- Earlier in the day, the Communist Party of Czechoslovakia (KSČ) Presidium held its weekly meeting at 2:00, where Vasil Bilak and the other hardline members had planned to read a position paper regarding chaos in the KSČ and were prepared to force a vote of no-confidence in Alexander Dubček's management of KSČ affairs, then request the intervention of the Warsaw Pact to set up a "revolutionary workers' and peasants' government" with Alois Indra as Premier; Dubček was discussing the position paper when news of the invasion was received. Earlier in the meeting, plans for the KSČ's 14th Party Congress were approved, along with a resolution rescinding all restrictions on the teaching of religion in schools.
- The wreckage of the Soviet nuclear submarine K-129, which had sunk along with its crew of 98 on March 8, was located by the USS Halibut northwest of Oahu at an approximate depth of 4,900 metres (16,000 ft).

== August 21, 1968 (Wednesday) ==
- A riot at the Ohio Penitentiary in Columbus was brought to an end at 2:45 in the afternoon, and nine guards were rescued after having been held hostage for 30 hours. More than 300 of the 2,500 inmates had seized control of the prison after a guard was overpowered by a prisoner and had his keys taken. After a spokesman for the inmates threatened to burn the hostages to death if more demands were not met, prison warden Marion J. Koloski delivered an ultimatum at 2:30 and told the rebels that he was giving them "one last chance" to release the guards, and that they had 15 minutes to respond. When the hostages were not released after 15 minutes, officers detonated dynamite outside the cell walls and, seconds later, in the roof over the cell block. Five inmates were shot and killed by the SWAT team during the rescue.
- Three hours after the invasion of Czechoslovakia the night before, at 2:00 in the morning local time, when most of Czechoslovakia's residents were asleep, Radio Prague broadcast an announcement "to the entire people of the Czechoslovak Socialist Republic", and said that troops from five nations had crossed the nation's frontiers. "This happened without the knowledge of the President of the Republic, the Chairman of the National Assembly, the Premier or the First Secretary of the Czechoslovak Communist Party Central Committee," the announcer explained, and urged citizens to "maintain calm and not offer resistance to troops on the march," adding that "Our army, security corps and People's Militia has not received a command to defend the country."
- Members of the KSC Presidium adjourned their meeting after the broadcast at 2:15 and remained at the KSC offices. At 8:30, as recounted later by Josef Smrkovský's secretary, a Soviet Army colonel arrived with soldiers and two Czechoslovak State Security agents and informed Party First Secretary Dubček, Prime Minister Černík, and KSČ Presidium members Josef Smrkovský, František Kriegel, Josef Špaček, and Bohumil Šimon that they were under arrest by order of the "Revolutionary Security Committee" headed by another KSC Presidium member, Alois Indra. The group was flown to the Soviet military base in Poland at Legnica, then to a base located in Zakarpattia Oblast, territory that had been annexed from Czechoslovakia by the Soviets in 1946.
- Romanian Communist Party (RCP) General Secretary Nicolae Ceaușescu surprised the non-Communist world by publicly condemning the Warsaw Pact invasion of Czechoslovakia while speaking to a crowd in Bucharest from a balcony. "The incursion in Czechoslovakia of troops belonging to the five socialist countries represents a big mistake," he told the crowd, "and a serious threat to peace in Europe and for the destiny of socialism in the world... There can be no excuse, and there can be no reason to accept, even for a single moment, the idea of a military intervention in the domestic affairs of a fraternal socialist state."
- U.S. president Lyndon Johnson canceled a press conference during which he would have announced his plans to travel to the Soviet Union for a September 30 summit meeting in Leningrad. The evening before, Johnson had been visited by Soviet Ambassador Dobrynin at the White House at 8:15 to discuss Soviet and American discussions on missile limitations, without any mention of the invasion of Czechoslovakia that was already in progress, and Johnson had accepted Dobrynin's invitation to come to the USSR in the autumn.
- An Italian serial killer nicknamed the Monster of Florence (Il Mostro di Firenze) by the nation's press, murdered the first of 16 victims in a pattern that would last for 17 years. The killer's pattern was to attack couples in and around Florence, and started with the shooting of Antonio Lo Bianco and Barbara Locci at the small town of Signa.
- Born:
  - Theodore Beale, controversial American science fiction writer and right-wing activist expelled from the Science Fiction and Fantasy Writers of America; in Minnesota
  - Stretch (stage name for Randy Walker), American hip hop rapper and producer; in New York City (murdered, 1995)
  - Dina Carroll, English R&B singer; in Newmarket, Suffolk

== August 22, 1968 (Thursday) ==
- The Communist Party of Czechoslovakia moved up the September 9 start date of its 14th Party Congress, and 1,192 of the 1,543 delegates assembled at the CKD factory in Vysočany, a suburb of Prague. The delegates selected a new party central committee and a new presidium, whose leaders unanimously re-elected Alexander Dubček (who had been arrested by the Soviets the day before) as the KSČ First Secretary. An economist, Venek Šilhán, was selected to be the Acting First Secretary during Dubček's absence. At the same time, 11 of the KSČ's 22 Presidium members met at the Soviet Embassy in Prague and, at about 5:00, selected Alois Indra to be the Premier of a new government; but when they sought approval, President Ludvik Svoboda refused to accept a puppet government, and reaffirmed that Oldřich Černík would continue to be the prime minister. President Svoboda then met with Soviet ambassador Stepan Chervonenko and asked to be allowed to fly to Moscow to join the other Czechoslovak leaders who had been arrested. Permission was granted, on the condition that Svoboda be accompanied by a collaborationist, Vice-Premier Gustáv Husák.
- The 1968 Democratic National Convention opened in Chicago and would continue until August 30. During the event, riots would break out as police clashed with anti-war protesters. The Democratic Party nominated Hubert Humphrey for president, and Edmund Muskie for vice president. The riots and subsequent trials would become an essential part of the activism for the Youth International Party, but would also taint the image of the Democrats in the November elections.
- Ringo Starr briefly quit The Beatles after frustrations with the recording session of the song Back in the U.S.S.R. for the White Album, and arguments with Paul McCartney; during Starr's absence, McCartney played the drums for the studio recording and overdubbing. While Starr was on vacation with his wife and children during the absence, he would be inspired to write the song Octopus's Garden.
- Pope Paul VI made the first papal visit ever to South America, landing at Bogotá, Colombia, at 10:27 in the morning after an 11-hour and 45-minute flight from Rome on a chartered Avianca Airlines 707.

== August 23, 1968 (Friday) ==
- Caswell County, North Carolina, which had the last remaining racially segregated school system in the United States, was ordered by U.S. District Judge Edwin M. Stanley to integrate its schools after years of getting deferments for submitting a desegregation plan. In granting a writ of mandamus in a suit by the NAACP against the Caswell County Schools, Judge Stanley wrote that although it was too late to desegregate in time for the start of school, the school system had until November 1 to file a plan to bring together white and black students, teachers and administrative personnel in time for the 1969–70 school year. School superintendent Thomas H. Whitley would recount later that the NAACP attorney (Julius L. Chambers) told Judge Stanley that the U.S. Supreme Court had ruled that "the time for procrastination is over". Judge Stanley then conceded that Chambers was correct, and told the school officials that "The Supreme Court has made its statement. You don't have any further choice. You have to get on with integration."
- With photographs by Alfred Eisenstaedt, the American newsweekly Life magazine brought national and worldwide attention to the industrial pollution of America's Great Lakes, particularly Lake Erie, Lake Ontario and Lake Michigan. The photo essay, "Blighted Great Lakes" (subtitled "Shocking case of our inland seas dying from man-made filth"), was written by Richard Woodbury, who concluded "The pictures on these pages point to the appalling conclusion that water pollution has brought the U.S. to a point of no return: either we curb the slatternly despoiling of our environment, or we accept the death of lakes and rivers and a denigration of the quality in our life."
- Czechoslovakia's prime minister Dubček was brought from a prison in the Ukrainian SSR to Moscow, where Soviet first secretary Brezhnev, Premier Alexei Kosygin and President Nikolai V. Podgorny discussed the invasion with him. A larger meeting, involving the incarcerated Czechoslovak party officials and the Soviet leadership, began later in the day.
- Nigeria launched its final assault on the secessionist republic of Biafra under the command of Colonel Benjamin Adekunle, who reportedly instructed the Third Nigerian Army Division to "Shoot anything that moves"; thousands of Ibo civilians would be killed in their villages in the months that followed.
- Born: KK (stage name for Krishnakumar Kunnath), Indian playback singer (d. 2022); in Delhi

== August 24, 1968 (Saturday) ==
- France became the fifth nation to successfully explode a hydrogen bomb, joining the United States, the Soviet Union, the United Kingdom and China as a thermonuclear superpower. The test, codenamed "Operation Canopus", took place over the Fangataufa Atoll in French Polynesia at 8:30 in the morning local time (1830 UTC) after heavy rains had caused six postponements.
- The Northern Ireland Civil Rights Association staged the first civil rights protest march held in Northern Ireland in the United Kingdom, to call attention to discrimination against the Roman Catholic minority. Between 2,500 and 4,000 people marched peacefully from the coal-mining town of Coalisland along the 5-mile (8.0 km) route to Dungannon, where local police barred the protesters from conducting a rally.
- Born:
  - Tim "King Fish" Salmon, American baseball outfielder and 1993 AL rookie of the year; in Long Beach, California
  - Shoichi Funaki, Japanese-born American WWE wrestler; in Tokyo

== August 25, 1968 (Sunday) ==
- A group of eight dissidents in the Soviet Union were arrested in Moscow's Red Square after protesting against the Soviet invasion of Czechoslovakia. At noon, poet Natalya Gorbanevskaya, physicist Pavel Litvinov, writer Larisa Bogoraz, linguist Viktor Fainberg, poet Vadim Delaunay and Konstantin Babitsky, Vladimir Dremliuga, and Tatiana Baeva surprised the crowd by unfurling a Czechoslovak flag and displaying protest banners. Within three minutes, security agents of the KGB moved in and beat up the five male protesters; all of the group except for Baeva would be charged with violations of laws against Anti-Soviet agitation and would receive sentences ranging from three to five years of "exile" to remote settlements in Siberia to detention in a labor camp or forced confinement in a psikhushka, a psychiatric hospital for commitment on false diagnoses of schizophrenia and other mental illnesses.
- Becky Godwin, the 14-year-old daughter of Virginia Governor Mills Godwin, was struck by lightning while walking back to the seashore in Virginia Beach on a sunny day, the victim of a thunderstorm several miles offshore. She never regained consciousness after being injured. Four days later, she died in a hospital from "complications arising from severe electrical burns of the lungs".
- Born: Rachael Ray, American television talk-show host; in Glens Falls, New York
- Died: Harry Elmer Barnes, 79, American historian known after World War II for his prominent role in the Holocaust denial movement

== August 26, 1968 (Monday) ==
- The reforms of the Prague Spring were rolled back with the execution of the Moscow Protocol between the Soviet Union and Czechoslovakia after Alexander Dubček, Oldřich Černík, Josef Smrkovský and other officials of the Communist Party of Czechoslovakia (KSČ) signed a document repealing the KSČ's enactments, reimposed censorship, and agreed that Soviet Army troops could remain on Czechoslovak soil until further notice. In return, Leonid Brezhnev and other leaders of the Communist Party of the Soviet Union agreed to release the Czechoslovak leaders, allow them to remain in office temporarily, and to dismiss charges of counterrevolution.
- Hey Jude, the best-selling single ever recorded by The Beatles (as well as the most popular single of 1968 in the U.S. and the UK, and half a century later, still the 10th best-seller worldwide of all recorded songs), was released for sale in the United States, followed four days later by its debut in the United Kingdom. It was the first Beatles release for their new company, Apple Records.
- Died: Kay Francis, 63, American film actress who was the leading actress for Warner Brothers during the 1930s

== August 27, 1968 (Tuesday) ==
- Allowed by the Soviet Union to return to Czechoslovakia with his post as KSČ Party First Secretary intact, Alexander Dubček made a nationwide radio address hours after his return and urged citizens to accept the terms of surrender in the Moscow Protocol; by then, 84 Czechoslovaks and four Soviet soldiers had been killed in the first eight days of the invasion. Several times during the broadcast, Dubček choked, paused at length and could be heard crying as he asked his compatriots not to resist the occupation and to forgive him for capitulating, commenting at one point, "I think you know why it is"; Dubček would retain his post, albeit without any real power, for eight more months. The subsequent "normalization", a rollback of reforms in late 1968 and 1969, is referred to as the normalizace in Czech and the normalizácia in Slovak.
- Raman Raghav, a serial killer who was suspected in the murders of 12 people in the city of Bombay (now Mumbai) during the month of August, was arrested by Bombay police. Raman, who had killed his victims with knives or crowbars, initially said that his motive was robbery, but would later confess to 41 murders and claim that he had been motivated by religious beliefs.
- In Mexico City, a crowd of 300,000 students and their supporters staged a peaceful antigovernment demonstration, the largest up to that time in Mexican history, to protest against the administration of President Diaz Ordaz.
- Died:
  - Princess Marina of Greece and Denmark, 61, widow of Prince George, Duke of Kent, daughter-in-law of King George V of the United Kingdom and representative of the British royal family.
  - Robert Z. Leonard, 78, American film director

== August 28, 1968 (Wednesday) ==
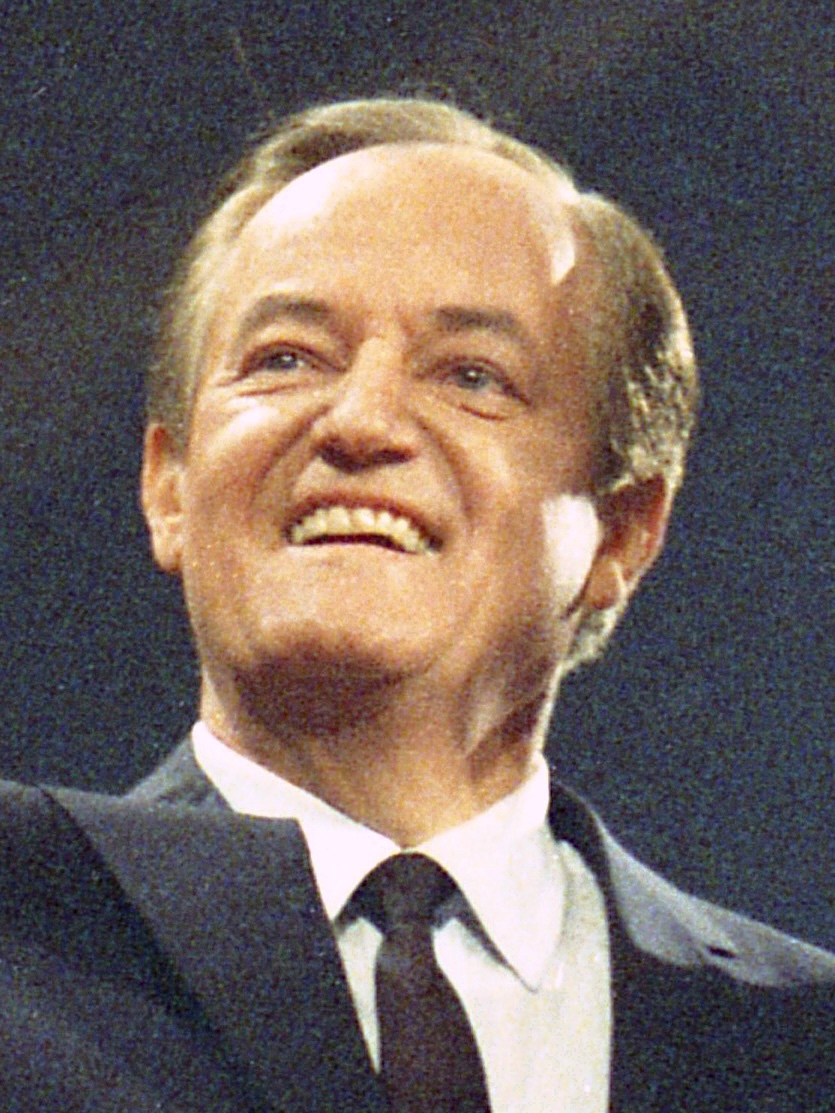
Humphrey

- U.S. vice president Hubert H. Humphrey was nominated as the Democratic Party's candidate for President on the first ballot at the national convention in Chicago. Needing 1,312 ballots to capture the nomination, Humphrey received 1,761¾. U.S. senator Eugene McCarthy, also from Humphrey's home state of Minnesota, was a distant second with 601, and U.S. senator George S. McGovern, from Humphrey's native state of South Dakota, was third with 164½.
- On the same day, after different speakers at Chicago's Grant Park addressed a crowd of 15,000 antiwar protesters, a crowd of about 1,500 people marched along Michigan Avenue toward the convention site at the International Amphitheatre where the convention was taking place, protesting Humphrey's nomination. The Chicago police confronted and attacked the protesters with billy clubs and tear gas at various places between the park and the convention center as violence reached its peak. Seven months later, a group of protest leaders designated as the Chicago Seven, and an eighth leader, Bobby Seale, would be indicted on federal charges of crossing state lines in an attempt to incite a riot. As one historian would note later, "Millions of Americans turned on their televisions expecting to see Hubert Humphrey win the Democratic presidential nomination," but saw the networks cut away to live coverage of the riots; recognizing what was happening, the protesters began to chant "The whole world is watching!".
- Selections were made for the all-England test cricket team scheduled to tour South Africa, and cricket fans were surprised and outraged when the selectors for the Marylebone Cricket Club declined to include Basil "Dolly" D'Oliveira, a brown-skinned native of South Africa who had become a naturalized British citizen. D. J. Insole, the chairman of the selection commission, defended the MCC's choices by saying "We think we have got rather better players in the side", and an editorial for The Guardian responded "Anyone prepared to swallow that would believe that the moon is a currant bun", pointing out that D'Oliveira had been the top scorer in the first Test against Australia, and the second highest scorer in the rematch, and concluding that the only explanation was that the MCC had caved to South Africa's apartheid policy. After more public outcry, and South Africa's refusal to grant D'Oliviera a visa to enter that country, the MCC would cancel the planned tour in September.
- John Gordon Mein, the United States Ambassador to Guatemala, was assassinated while trying to escape his limousine during an ambush. At 3:05 p.m., Mein was on his way from his home to the American Embassy in Guatemala City, and when his car was on Avenida de la Reforma, another automobile pulled up in front and a truck closed in from behind. The chauffeur was pulled from the car, and when Mein opened the back door and tried to flee, he was shot to death with a machine gun. Mein's killing marked the first time that an American ambassador had been murdered while in office.
- The restructuring of Czechoslovakia as "a socialist federation of two national states" was announced, and would become effective on October 28. A little more than 22 years later, the two states would peacefully separate into independent nations as the Czech Republic and Slovakia.
- Born: Billy Boyd, Scottish stage and film actor known for playing Pippin Took in The Lord of the Rings trilogy; in Glasgow
- Died: Willie Narmour, 80, popular American musician who recorded numerous country music hits as part of the duo of Narmour and Smith

== August 29, 1968 (Thursday) ==
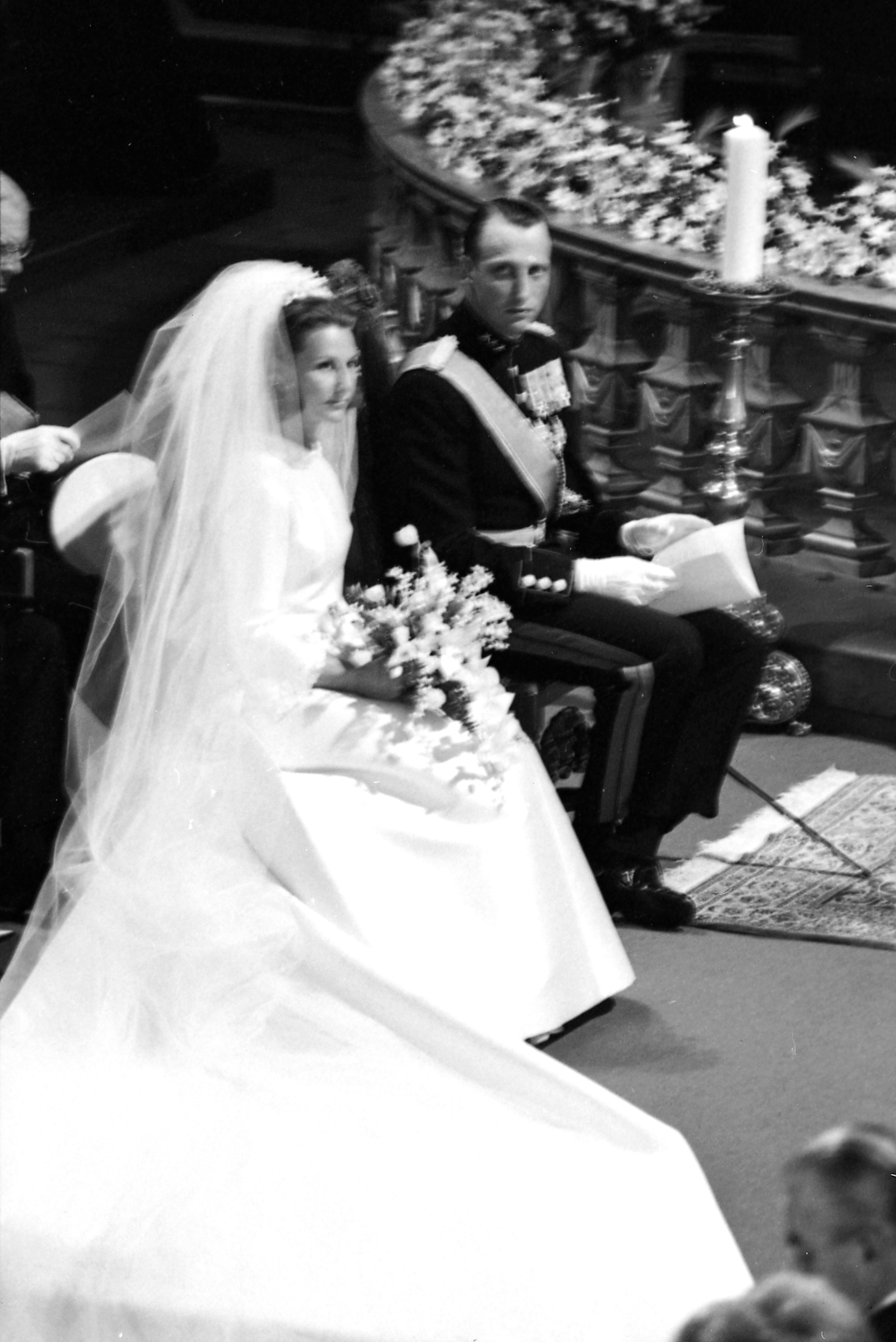
August 29, 1968: Prince Harald marries Sonja Haraldsen

- Crown Prince Harald (who later became King Harald V) of Norway married Sonja Haraldsen, a commoner whom he had dated for nine years. The couple had been prohibited from marriage because the Norwegian government would not approve a waiver of a law requiring a member of the Norwegian royalty to marry another member of nobility or royalty, and Prince Harald had refused to marry until the rule was lifted. Because Sonja's father was deceased, King Olav V accompanied her down the aisle in the "father of the bride" role.
- According to an urban legend which would begin circulating on the Internet around 2014, every television in America shut down for about 25 seconds on this date, during which a murmuring sound was heard. Snopes would rate this story as "False" in March 2023, stating that there was no historical or eyewitness evidence to support it.
- Born: Ricky Memphis (stage name for Riccardo Fortunati), Italian TV and film actor known for the long running police show Distretto di Polizia; in Corleone, Sicily
- Died: U.S. Army Major General Ulysses S. Grant III, 87, American engineer and military officer. General Grant had been born four years before the 1884 death of his grandfather, former U.S. president and General of the Army Ulysses S. Grant.

== August 30, 1968 (Friday) ==
- Romanian Communist Party (RCP) General Secretary Nicolae Ceaușescu continued his public show of Romania's defiance of the Soviet Union during a mass rally at the city of Cluj, getting respect from the non-Communist Western nations and adding to his growing personality cult. For the first time Ceaușescu referred to the RCP (and by extension, himself) as the direct successor to three medieval Romanian rulers who fought the Ottoman Empire, Prince Mircea cel Bătrân of Wallachia and Prince Ștefan cel Mare of Moldavia, and Prince Mihai Viteazu, who unified Wallachia and Moldavia. "From that moment on," a historian would later note, "the cult of ancestors and the manipulation of national symbols became key ingredients of Ceaușescuism."
- African-American inmates rioted at the Long Bình Jail, the overcrowded military prison for U.S. servicemen near Saigon in South Vietnam. The uprising would last for 9 days; one inmate was killed, and 52 inmates and 63 military policemen were injured.
- Died: William Talman, 53, American actor best known for portraying "television's biggest loser" as Los Angeles prosecutor Hamilton Burger, who was bested every week by the title character on the popular mystery and courtroom series, Perry Mason. Six weeks before his death from lung cancer, Talman— who had smoked three packs of cigarettes a day— filmed a 60-second television commercial for the American Cancer Society, urging viewers to avoid cigarette smoking and would set a precedent for other such "warnings from beyond the grave".

== August 31, 1968 (Saturday) ==
- A 7.4 magnitude earthquake killed more than 15,000 people after striking the Khorasan province in northeastern Iran at 3:17 in the afternoon local time (1047 UTC). The hardest hit areas were in and around the towns of Ferdows, Kezri and Kakhk. Kakhk lost 6,000 of its 7,000 residents as the earthquake destroyed all but one of its buildings, a mosque.
- Gary Sobers, a batsman for the Nottinghamshire County Cricket Club, set a first-class cricket record by scoring 36 runs in one time at bat during a match against Glamorgan, hitting all six balls bowled to him by Glamorgan's Malcolm Nash during his over outside the pitch boundary for six consecutive sixes. The feat has been repeated only once since then, by Ravi Shastri on January 10, 1985. Nottinghamshire would go on to win the match, 394 to 254.
- The Popular Front for the Liberation of Palestine released the last 12 people whom they had held captive for forty days after the July 22 hijacking of El Al Flight 426. Of the original 48 people originally board before the plane was diverted to Algiers, the seven crewmembers and five male passengers, all Israelis, remained and were flown to Rome to be handed over to Italian authorities. Israel, in turn agreed to release 12 Arab commandos being held in Israeli jails.
- The first multi-organ transplant was carried out as four different patients at Houston's Methodist Hospital received organs from a single donor, a 20-year-old woman who had been killed by a gunshot. Dr. Michael DeBakey led a team of 60 people (surgeons, nurses and support staff) in transplanting the woman's heart, lung, and each of her kidneys into four different men who ranged in age from 22 to 50 years old.
- Thirteen people were killed in an apartment fire in Gary, Indiana, in the worst disaster in the city's history.
- Born: Hideo Nomo, Japanese-born professional baseball pitcher who became the first Japan League star to have a long Major League Baseball career; in Osaka. After being the Pacific League in 1990 for the Kintetsu Buffaloes in 1990, he was the National League Rookie of the Year for the Los Angeles Dodgers in 1995, and played for seven MLB teams before retiring in 2008.
- Died:
  - Joe Tracy, 83, American bank robber and the last member of the Ashley Gang that stole from 40 banks across Florida and Georgia between 1915 and John Ashley's death in a shootout in 1924. Tracy had been in prison since 1948 for robbing the Perkins State Bank in Williston, Florida, turning down a chance for parole by refusing to disclose where he hid $23,700 taken in the theft.
  - Dennis O'Keefe (Edward Vance Flanagan), 60, American film actor
