= Josef Špaček =

Josef Špaček may refer to:

- Josef Špaček (politician)
- Josef Špaček (violinist)
