= František Kriegel =

Czechoslovak politician and physician

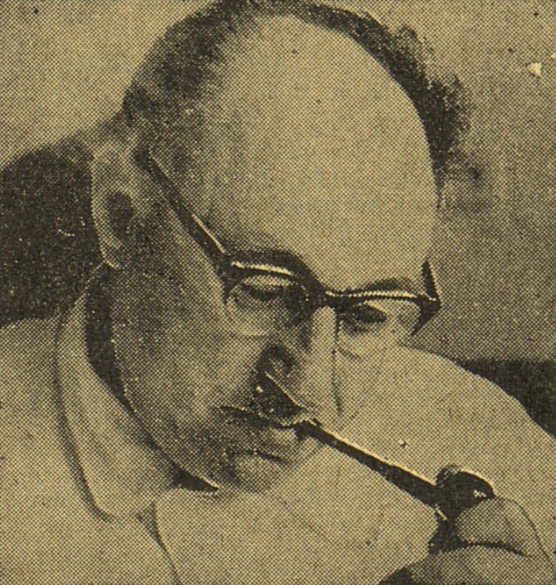
- In 1968
- Born: 10 April 1908; Ivano-Frankivsk, Austria-Hungary
- Died: 3 December 1979 (aged 71); Prague, Czechoslovakia
- Occupations: Politician; physician
- Spouse: Riva Krieglová (m. 1948)

František Kriegel (10 April 1908 – 3 December 1979) was a Czechoslovak politician, physician, and a member of the Communist Party reform wing of the Prague Spring (1968). He was the only one of the political leaders who, during the Warsaw Pact invasion of Czechoslovakia, declined to sign the Moscow Protocol.

== Early life ==
František Kriegel was born in Stanisławów (today Ivano-Frankivsk), Austria-Hungary (present Ukraine) to the family of a Jewish builder. His father died when František was ten, and the family became dependent upon help from František's grandfather. Due to the fierce anti-semitism in Galicia of that time, young Kriegel left home to study medicine at German part of Charles University in Prague (instead of the nearby Lviv University where there was an unofficial Jewish quota in place). His mother could only give him a little money and six white shirts.

== Prague ==
Kriegel had to earn a living in a shoemaker's shop or as an extra in the theatre (he even sold sausages in football stadiums), but he enjoyed an independent life in the highly tolerant society of 1920s Czechoslovakia. During the Great Depression, he joined the Communist Party of Czechoslovakia (KSČ) and believed that social and national justice would solve the problem of the poor and the Jewish question. He became a doctor of medicine in 1934 and started his career in the I. Internal Medicine Clinic in Prague.

== Spain and the Far East ==
In December 1936, Kriegel joined the International Brigades to fight against Spanish nationalists of General Franco in the Spanish Civil War. He served as a doctor and gained the rank of major. After the defeat of Republicans in 1939, Kriegel crossed the Pyrenees to France where he was interned in Saint-Cyprien and then in Camp Gurs. A return to Czechoslovakia was impossible because it had been occupied by Nazi Germany. Kriegel accepted an assignment from the Norwegian Red Cross to go as a doctor to China to help in the Second Sino-Japanese War. He joined a group of 20 doctors, among them Friedrich Kisch (1894–1968), brother to Egon Erwin Kisch. During the siege of Walawbum, he treated nearly 50 injured soldiers. Toward the end of the war, he served with Chinese and American units in India and Burma where he witnessed the victory of the Allies in October 1945.

== Back in Czechoslovakia ==
Kriegel returned to Czechoslovakia in November 1945 and, while continuing to work as a doctor, he involved himself in the political work of the Communist Party. He was a member of the KSČ Regional Committee in Prague and was working as a secretary in Lidové milice (People's Militias) when the KSČ seized control of the country in February 1948. He was appointed as the undersecretary of the Ministry of Health in 1949. During the political purges of the party in the 1950s, Kriegel had to leave the ministry and worked as a doctor for the Tatra company. He resumed his medical career in 1957 and became chief physician at the Vinohrady hospital in Prague. In 1960, he went to Cuba as an adviser of the Fidel Castro's government on the organisation of medical care – thus he was there at the time of the Cuban Missile Crisis. When he returned to Czechoslovakia, Kriegel refused a post in the party organisation but stood as a member of the National Assembly and was elected in 1964. Finally, he became a member of the Central Committee of KSČ in 1966, though he was opposed to the conservative neo-Stalinist stream in the party. When Alexander Dubček was elected the first secretary of the Central Committee of KSČ in January 1968, Kriegel was one of the main proponents of the democratic wing of the party. Throughout this period, he did not give up his medical career; he worked as chief physician first at the Rheumatic Diseases Research Institute (1963–1965) and then at Thomayer University Hospital in Prague (1965–1969).

== Prague Spring ==
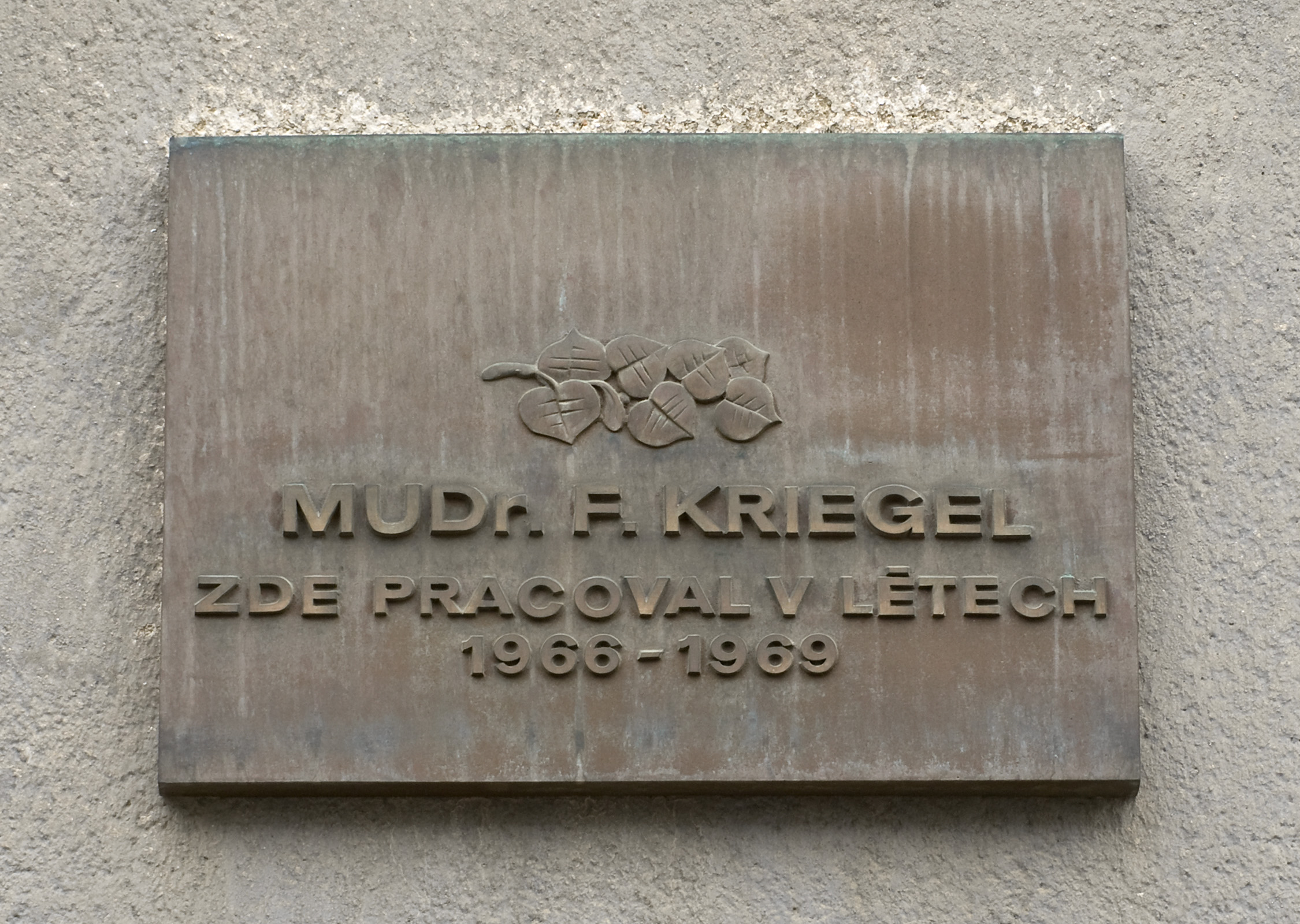
Memorial plaque in Thomayer University Hospital, Prague

In April 1968, Kriegel became the chairman of the Central Committee of the National Front (a coalition of the Communist Party and its allied satellite parties) and a member of Presidium of the Central Committee of KSČ. As one of the main personalities during the Prague Spring, he grew to be hated by Soviet officials as well as the conservative Czechoslovak Communists. During the Warsaw Pact invasion of Czechoslovakia on 21 August 1968, he and five other main representatives of the party were arrested by the Soviet KGB and Czechoslovak StB (Šalgovič) units and deported by plane to Moscow (the others were Alexander Dubček, Oldřich Černík, Josef Smrkovský, Josef Špaček, and Bohumil Šimon). Kriegel was treated particularly roughly, and made the target of anti-semitic insults. He was so distrusted by the Soviets that he was not allowed to be present during the negotiations of the two parties, and when he was asked to sign the text of the concluding statement he was the only one of 26 politicians to refuse. "Send me to Siberia or shoot me dead", he replied. He was eventually released with the others and accordingly, he voted against the Temporary Sojourn of the Soviet Army Treaty in October 1968 (with three other MPs). He was removed from the Central Committee and then expelled from the party in 1969.

== 1969–1979 ==
In the last decade of his life, Kriegel worked for the opposition. He was among the first to sign Charter 77. On 18 September 1979, he was hospitalized with a heart attack. He died in a Prague hospital under police control on 3 December 1979, and his body was seized by the authorities to prevent any demonstrations at a funeral. He is buried together with his wife Riva Krieglova in Prague's Motol Cemetery near the Memorial to Victims of Communism.

== Legacy ==
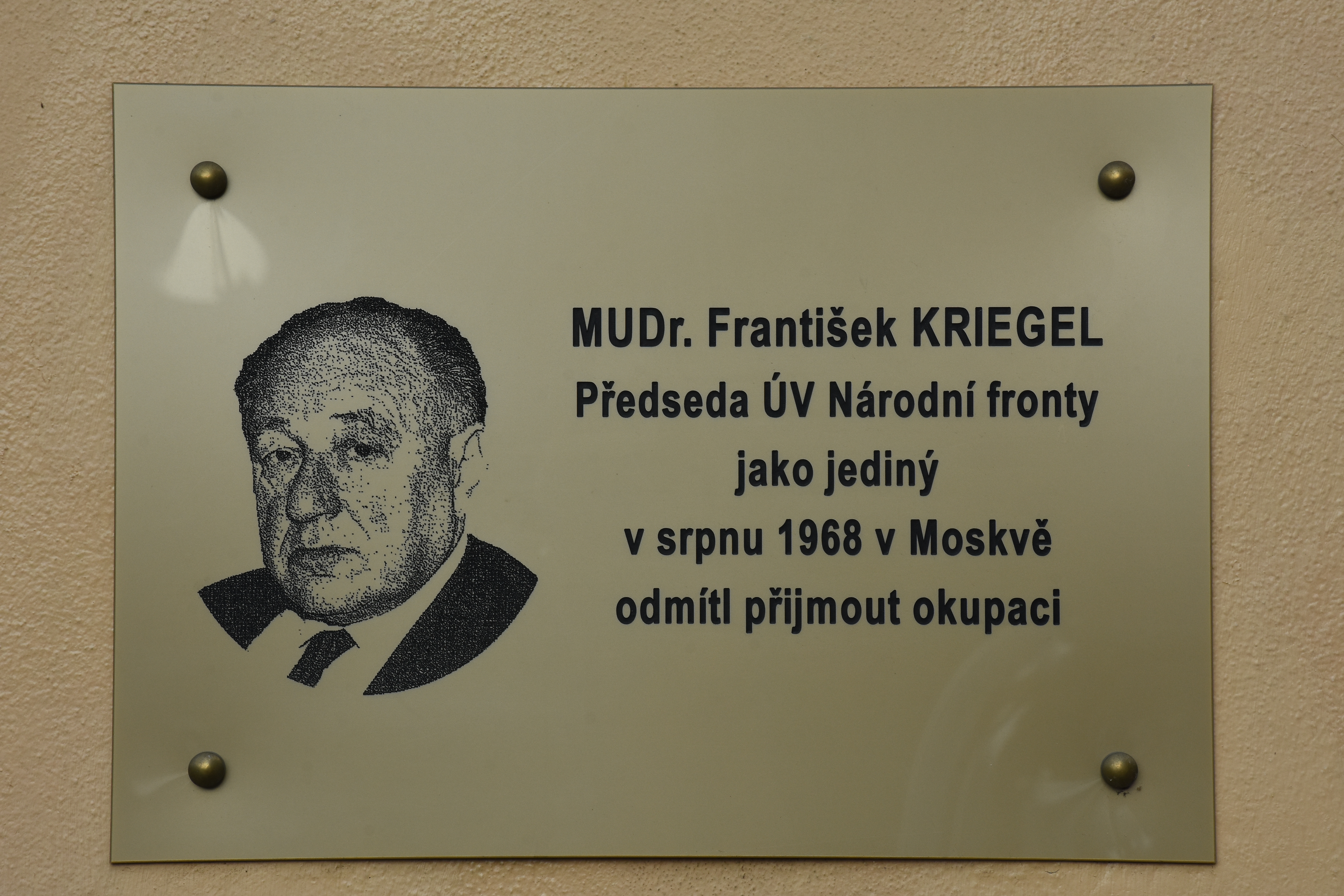
Memorial plaque in Škrétova street, Prague

The František Kriegel Award is granted annually to a person who has fought for human rights. It was founded in Stockholm in 1987 and is funded by the Charter 77 Fund. In August 2014 the city council of Prague 2 municipality refused to grant him an honorary citizenship.
