= Normalization (Czechoslovakia) =

Period of Czechoslovak history

In the history of Czechoslovakia, normalization (Czech: normalizace, Slovak: normalizácia) is a name commonly given to the period following the Warsaw Pact invasion of Czechoslovakia in August 1968 and up to the glasnost era of liberalization that began in the Soviet Union and its neighboring nations in 1987. It was characterized by the restoration of the conditions prevailing before the Prague Spring reform period led by the First Secretary Alexander Dubček of the Communist Party of Czechoslovakia (KSČ) earlier in 1968 and the subsequent preservation of the new status quo. Some historians date the period from the signing of the Moscow Protocol by Dubček and the other jailed Czechoslovak leaders on 26 August 1968, while others date it from the replacement of Dubček by Gustáv Husák on 17 April 1969, followed by the official normalization policies referred to as Husakism. The policy ended either with Husák's removal as leader of the Party on 17 December 1987, or with the beginning of the Velvet Revolution on 17 November 1989, which would see the resignation of the entire Communist Party leadership within a week and an end to Communist rule in Czechoslovakia.

== 1969–1971 (Removing the reforms and reformers) ==
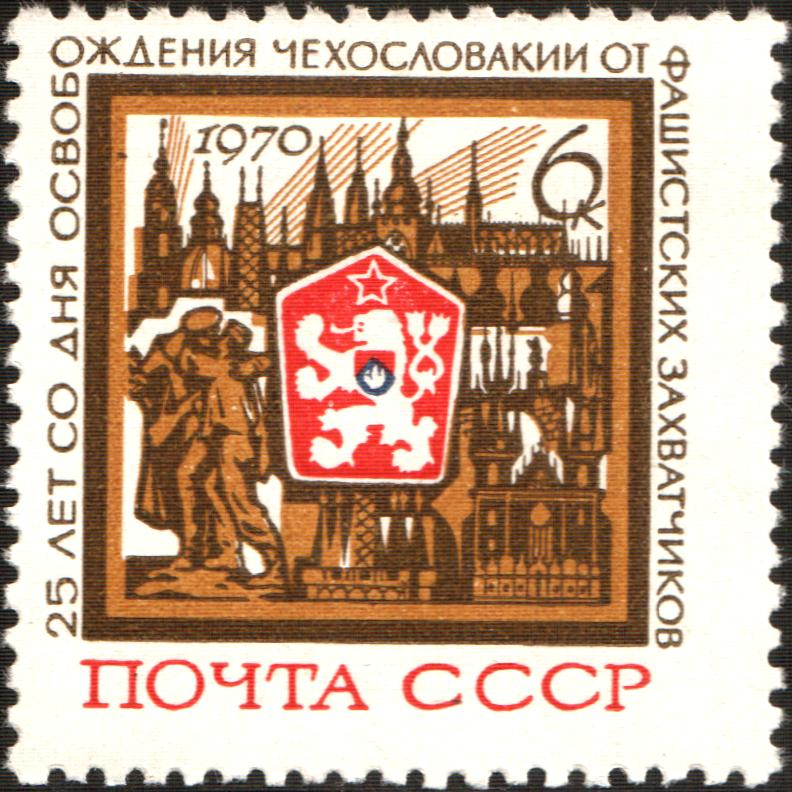
Soviet stamp issued in 1970, marking the 25th Anniversary of the Liberation of Czechoslovakia from Fascist Occupation.

When Husák replaced Dubček as leader of the KSČ in April 1969, his regime acted quickly to ‘normalize’ the country's political situation. The chief objectives of Husák's normalization were the restoration of firm party rule and the reestablishment of Czechoslovakia's status as a committed member of the socialist bloc. The normalization process involved five interrelated steps:

- consolidate Husák's leadership and remove reformers from leadership positions;
- revoke or modify the laws enacted by the reform movement;
- reestablish centralized control over the economy;
- reinstate the power of police authorities; and
- expand Czechoslovakia's ties with other socialist nations.

Within a week of assuming power, Husák began to consolidate his leadership by ordering extensive purges of reformists still occupying key positions in the mass media, judiciary, social and mass organizations, lower party organs, and, finally, the highest levels of the KSČ. In the fall of 1969, twenty-nine liberals on the Central Committee of the KSČ were replaced by conservatives. Among the liberals ousted was Dubček, who was dropped from the Presidium (the following year Dubček was expelled from the party; he subsequently became a minor functionary in Slovakia). Husák also consolidated his leadership by appointing potential rivals to the new government positions created as a result of the 1968 Constitutional Law of Federation (which created the Czech Socialist Republic and the Slovak Socialist Republic).

Once it had consolidated power, the regime moved quickly to implement other normalization policies. In the two years following the invasion, the new leadership revoked some reformist laws (such as the National Front Act and the Press Act) and simply did not enforce others. It returned economic enterprises, which had been given substantial independence during the Prague Spring, to centralized control through contracts based on central planning and production quotas. It reinstated extreme police control, a step that was reflected in the harsh treatment of demonstrators marking the first anniversary of the August intervention.

Finally, Husák stabilized Czechoslovakia's relations with its allies by arranging frequent intrabloc exchanges and visits and redirecting Czechoslovakia's foreign economic ties toward greater involvement with socialist nations.

By May 1971, Husák could report to the delegates attending the officially sanctioned Fourteenth Party Congress that the process of normalization had been completed satisfactorily and that Czechoslovakia was ready to proceed toward higher forms of socialism.

== 1971–1987 (Preserving the status quo) ==
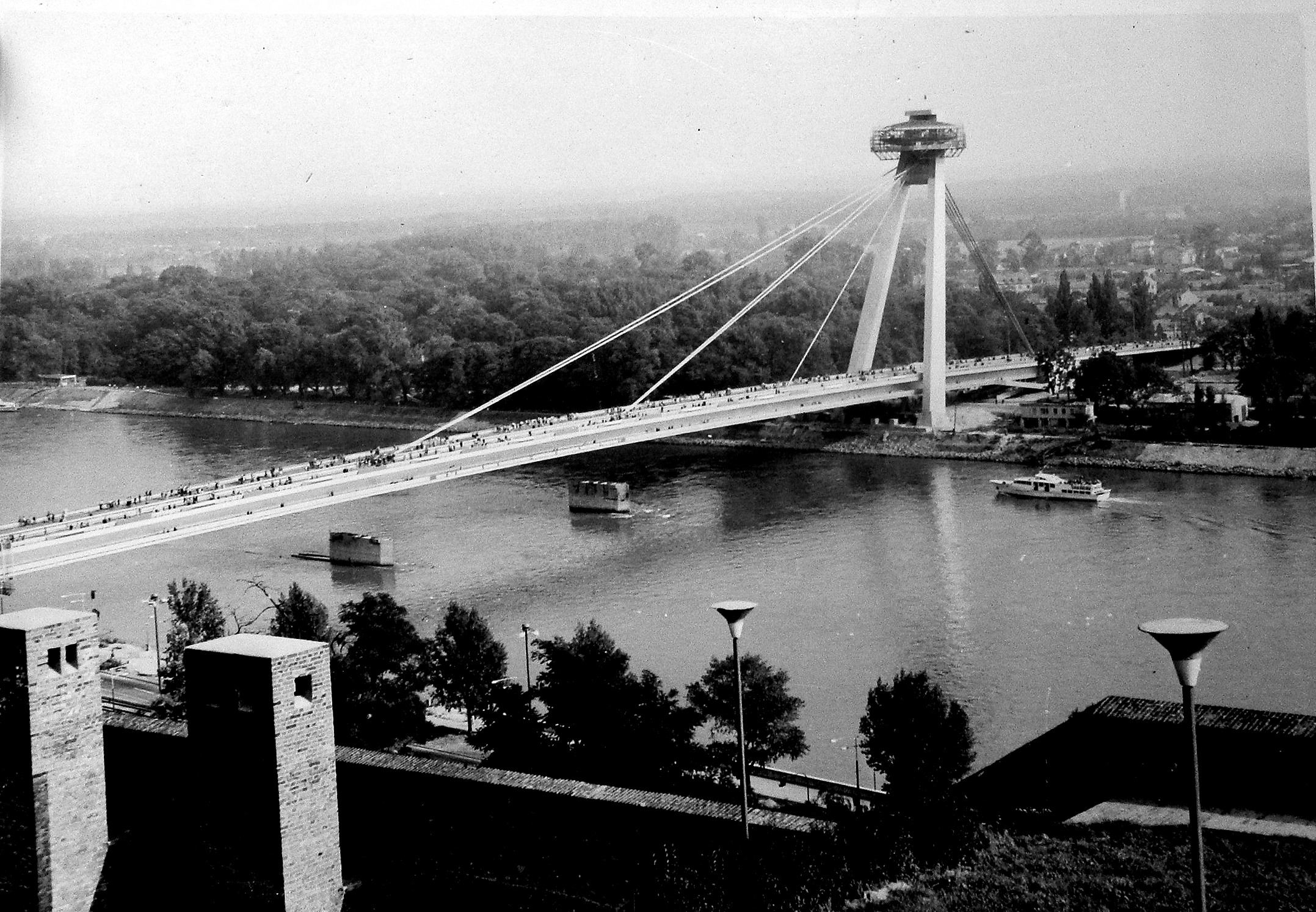
The Bridge of the Slovak National Uprising in Bratislava, opened in 1972

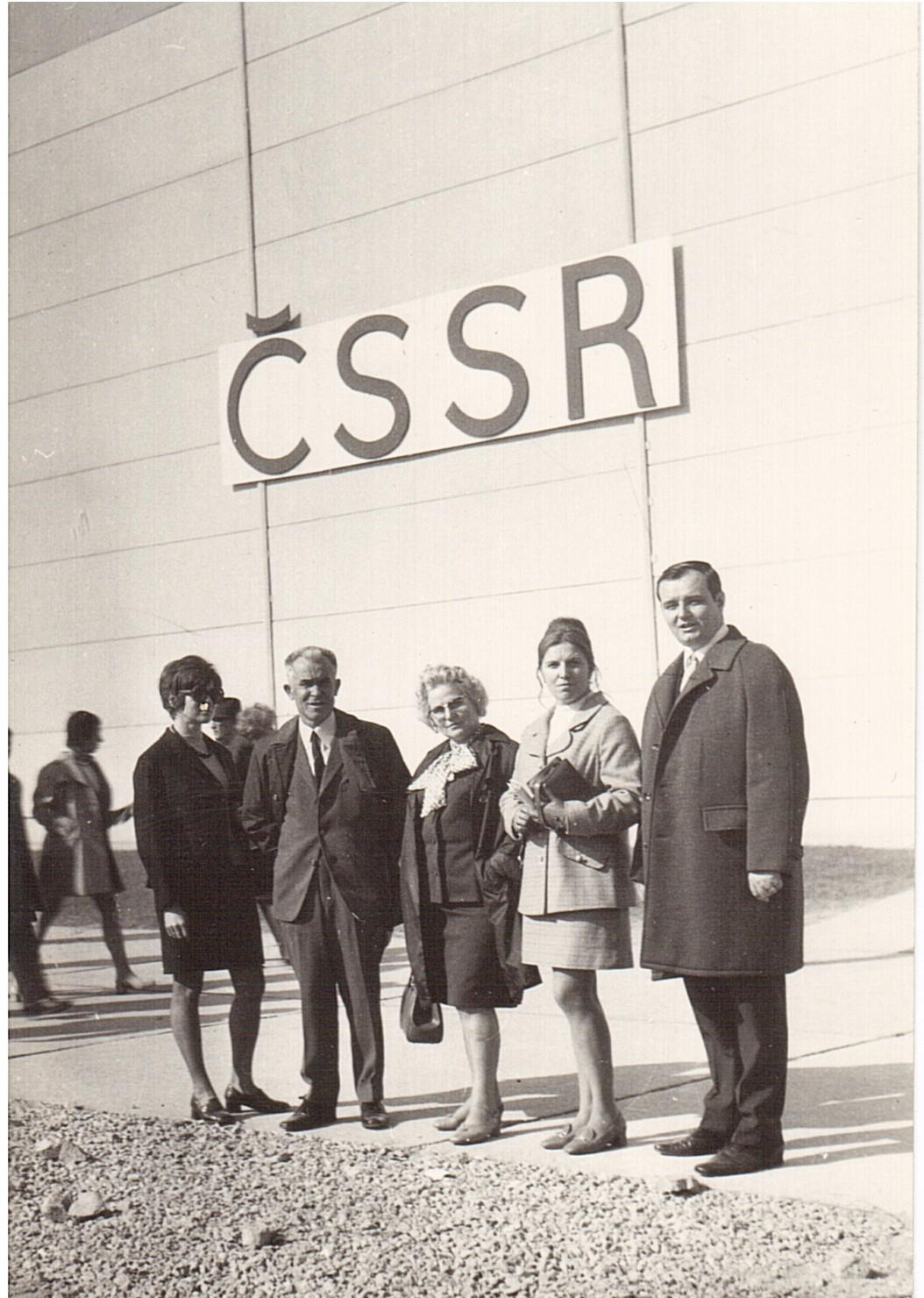
Czechoslovaks in 1972

The method by which the KSČ under Husák ruled was commonly summed up as ‘reluctant terror.’ It involved careful adherence to the Soviet Union's policy objectives and the use of what was perceived as the minimum amount of repression at home necessary to fulfill these objectives and prevent a return to Dubček-style reformism. The result was a regime that, while not a complete return to Stalinism, was far from being a liberal one either.

The membership of the KSČ's Presidium changed very little after 1971. The Sixteenth Party Congress in 1981 reelected the incumbent members of the Presidium and Secretariat and elevated one candidate member, Miloš Jakeš, to full membership in the Presidium. The Seventeenth Party Congress in 1986 retained the incumbent Secretariat and Presidium and added three new candidate members to the Presidium. In March 1987, Josef Korčák retired from the Presidium and was replaced by Ladislav Adamec. At the same time, Hoffman, a Presidium member, was also appointed a Central Committee secretary. In December 1987, Husák was forced to retire, and Jakeš became general secretary of the KSČ.

Popular control during this era of orthodoxy was maintained through various means. Repeated arrests and imprisonment of persons opposing the regime, such as members of Charter 77 and religious activists, continued throughout the 1970s and into the 1980s. Less coercive controls, such as punishment through job loss, demotion, denial of employment, denial of educational opportunities, housing restrictions, and refusal to grant travel requests, also prevailed. The level of repression increased over the years as Husák grew more conservative, and in the cultural realm sometimes approached the levels seen in Erich Honecker's East Germany and even Nicolae Ceauşescu's Romania.

Another means by which the Husák regime maintained control was to offer considerable consumer gains as a substitute for the loss of personal freedom. Government policies in the first half of the 1970s resulted in high economic growth and large increases in personal consumption. The widespread availability of material goods placated the general populace and promoted overall acceptance of Husák's stringent political controls. During the late 1970s, however, Czechoslovakia's economy began to stagnate, and the regime's ability to appease the population by providing material benefits diminished.

Although the Husák regime succeeded in preserving the status quo in Czechoslovakia for nearly two decades, the 1980s brought internal and external pressures to reform. Domestically, poor economic performance hindered the government's ability to produce the goods needed to satisfy consumer demands. Pressure for political change continued from activists representing, for example, the Roman Catholic Church and the Charter 77 movement. Externally, Czechoslovakia struggled to find a suitable response to the changes introduced by the new leadership in Moscow under Mikhail Gorbachev. Czechoslovakia's initial (1985–1987) response to the reformist trends in the Soviet Union focused on voicing public support for Gorbachev's new programs while steadfastly avoiding introducing similar programs within Czechoslovakia. In April 1987, Husák finally announced a half-hearted program of reform starting in 1991, but it was too late.

== Persons ==
A remarkable feature of the KSČ leadership under Husák was the absence of significant changes in personnel. The stability of the leadership during the late 1970s and the first half of the 1980s could be attributed not to unanimity in political opinion but rather to practical compromise among different factions vying to retain their leadership positions. Husák's leadership, then, was based not on any ability he may have had to rally opinion but rather on his skill in securing consensuses that were in the mutual interest of a coalition of party leaders. After the 1968 invasion, Husák successfully ruled over what was essentially a coalition of the conservative and hard-line factions within the top party leadership. (see KSČ-History for details)

== Objectives ==
The official objectives of normalization (in the narrower sense) were the restoration of firm KSČ rule and the reestablishment of Czechoslovakia's position in the socialist bloc. Its result, however, was a political environment that placed primary emphasis on the maintenance of a stable party leadership and its strict control over the population.

== Reactions ==
The absence of popular support for the Husák leadership was an inevitable reaction to the repressive policies instituted during the normalization process. Early post-invasion efforts to keep alive the spirit of the Prague Spring were quashed through a series of subversion trials in 1972 that led to jail sentences ranging from nine months to six and one-half years for the opposition leaders. Czechoslovak citizens over the age of fifteen were required to carry a small red identification book, containing an array of information about the individual and a number of pages to be stamped by employers, health officials, and other authorities. All citizens also had permanent files at the office of their local KSČ neighborhood committee, another at their place of employment, and another at the Ministry of Interior.

The most common attitudes toward political activity since the 1968 Warsaw Pact invasion have been apathy, passivity, and escapism. For the most part, citizens of Czechoslovakia retreated from public political concern during the 1970s into the pursuit of the private pleasures of consumerism. Individuals sought the material goods that remained available during the 1970s, such as new automobiles, houses in the country, household appliances, and access to sporting events and entertainment. As long as these consumer demands were met, the populace for the most part tolerated the stagnant political climate.

Another symptom of the political malaise during the 1970s was the appearance of various forms of antisocial behavior. Petty theft and wanton destruction of public property reportedly were widespread. Alcoholism, already at levels that alarmed officials, increased; absenteeism and declining worker discipline affected productivity; and emigration, the ultimate expression of alienation, surpassed 100,000 during the 1970s.

== Neonormalization ==
Czech philosophers Václav Bělohradský and Stanislav Komárek use the term ‘neonormalization’ (neonormalizace) for a stage of Czech society in the post-communist period, which is compared with the torpidity and hypocrisy of the 1970s and 1980s.

Bělohradský in his book Společnost nevolnosti (Slon, 2007) calls ‘neonormalization’ the direction since 1992 that all alternative opinions are crowded out, a culture shifts into the trash of entertainers, next the deepening of democracy is blocked, the public space is infested with right-wing ideology and Czech Republic participated in all sorts of nefarious wars.

Komárek, a philosopher and biologist, in many his articles since 2006 popularizes his opinion that in certain stages of society development, the administrative and formalistic aspect (or the ‘power of mediocres’) outweighs a common sense, creativity and utility. Pressure for conformity intensely rises and everyone is obliged to "sell his soul" to keep up in social structures. This neonormalistic period in the Czech Republic began ‘after 20 years of freedom’, it means about in 2010 year, in Komárek's view.

This term is discussed and used by many other authors.

== See also ==
- Warsaw Pact invasion of Czechoslovakia
- Brezhnev stagnation
- History of Czechoslovakia (1948–1989)
- Prague underground (culture)
  - Mánička
