= Moscow Protocol =

1968 document in Czechoslovakia

The Moscow Protocol (Czech: Moskevský protokol and Slovak: Moskovský protokol, officially Protocol of the negotiations of the ČSSR and USSR delegations) was a document signed by Czechoslovak political leaders in Moscow, after the Prague Spring. The negotiations took place from 23 to 26 August 1968. The main signatories were President Ludvík Svoboda, First Secretary of the Central Committee of the Communist Party of Czechoslovakia Alexander Dubček, Prime Minister Oldřich Černík, Chairman of the National Assembly Josef Smrkovský and most of the ministers and Communist Party leaders (Gustáv Husák among them). The only person present at the negotiations who declined to sign was František Kriegel.

The document included among its many expectations, promises to protect socialism in Czechoslovakia, to act upon the promises made in the Bratislava Declaration, to denounce the 14th Party Congress and its resolutions, to restrain critical Czechoslovak media, and to reject any interference in the Eastern Bloc by the United Nations Security Council.
