= Mary Heimann =

American historian

Mary Heimann is a British historian and Professor of Modern History at Cardiff University. She is particularly noted for her book, Czechoslovakia: The State That Failed.

== Books ==
- Catholic Devotion in Victorian England. Oxford University Press, Oxford 1995.
- Czechoslovakia: The State That Failed. Yale University Press, New Haven, CT 2011.
- Československo – stát, ktery zklamal. Petrkov, Havlíčkův Brod 2020.
