= Josef Špaček (politician) =

Josef Špaček (7 August 1927 – 11 July 2004) was a Czechoslovak communist politician who was an important member of the government during the 1968 reformist period known as the Prague Spring. He was appointed to the Central Committee of the communist party of Czechoslovakia after communist party leader Antonín Novotný was replaced by Slovak politician Alexander Dubček. Along with Dubček and other Central Committee members, Špaček was arrested by the Soviets during the Warsaw Pact invasion of Czechoslovakia (22 August 1968). In the years following the collapse of the Dubček government, Špaček was relegated to low-level, non-political positions, including working as a forestry official. Following the restoration of democracy in 1989, he was again politically active and in 1990 was elected to the national parliament.

== Background ==
Following World War II, liberated Czechoslovakia became increasingly subject to political pressure from the Soviet Union. Although the pre-war democracy was initially restored, by 1948, Communist influence had grown to the point that a puppet communist state under Klement Gottwald took power in February of that year. The communist party retained power until the pro-democracy, anti-communist Velvet Revolution of 1989. Following the death of Soviet dictator Joseph Stalin, however, some degree of reform took place in several of the Iron Curtain countries of central and eastern Europe.

Dissatisfaction with only modest reformist development within Czechoslovakia led to political maneuvering against First Party Secretary Antonín Novotný. Early in 1968, Novotný was ousted and replaced by Slovak Alexander Dubček. Špaček, a party official from Moravia, was soon appointed to the Central Committee, along with other reformist communist politicians, where he was a voice for increased democratization.

Five weeks before the Warsaw Pact invasion of Czechoslovakia, Špaček was injured in a head-on automobile collision outside the town of Havličův Brod (along the Bratislava-Prague highway) and briefly hospitalized.

Following the invasion of August 1968, Dubček and the other leading politicians were returned to their positions in the party and government, but within a year, under Soviet pressure, they were swept out, to be replaced by the hard-line government under Gustáv Husák. Like Dubček, Špaček was also relegated to minor posts, a common fate for the reformists.
