= Prague Spring =

Liberalisation in Czechoslovakia in 1968

- Part of the invasion of Czechoslovakia, the Cold War and the Protests of 1968
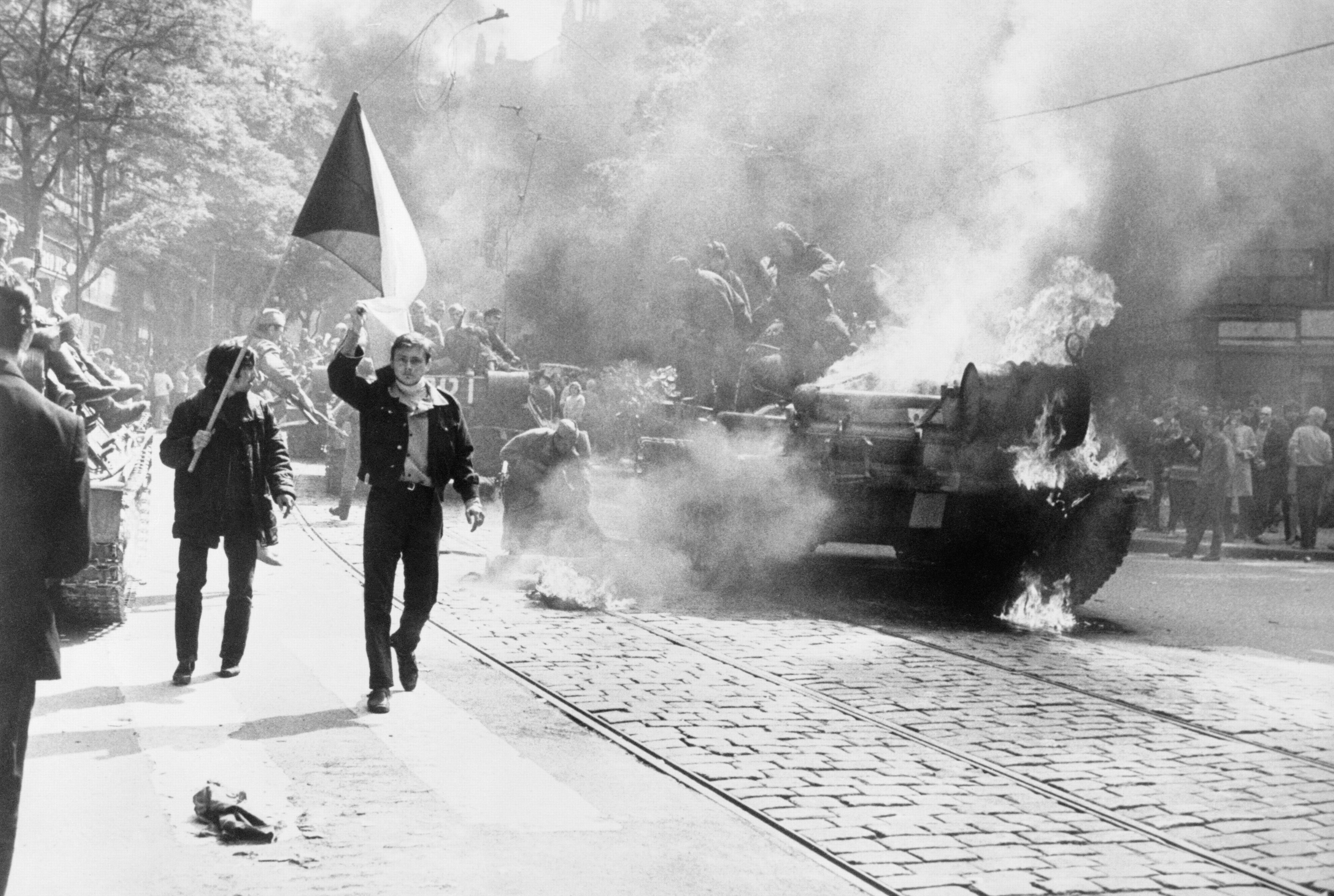
- Destroyed Soviet tank in Prague, 1968
- Date: 5 January – 21 August 1968 (7 months, 2 weeks and 2 days)
- Location: Czechoslovakia
- Participants: People and Government of Czechoslovakia; Warsaw Pact
- Outcome: Warsaw Pact invasion of Czechoslovakia: Normalization in Czechoslovakia

The Prague Spring (Czech: Pražské jaro; Slovak: Pražská jar) was a period of political liberalization and mass protest in the Czechoslovak Socialist Republic. It began on 5 January 1968, when reformist Alexander Dubček was elected First Secretary of the Communist Party of Czechoslovakia (KSČ), and continued until 21 August 1968, when the Soviet Union and four other Warsaw Pact members (Bulgaria, East Germany, Hungary and Poland) invaded the country to suppress the reforms.

The Prague Spring reforms were an attempt by Dubček to grant additional rights to the citizens of Czechoslovakia in an act of partial decentralization of the economy and democratization. The freedoms granted included a loosening of restrictions on the media, speech and travel. After national discussion of dividing the country into a federation of three republics, Bohemia, Moravia–Silesia and Slovakia, Dubček oversaw the decision to split into two, the Czech Socialist Republic and Slovak Socialist Republic. This dual federation was the only formal change that survived the invasion.

The reforms, especially the decentralization of administrative authority, were not received well by the USSR, which, after failed negotiations, sent half a million Warsaw Pact troops and tanks to occupy the country. The New York Times cited reports of 650,000 men equipped with the most modern and sophisticated weapons in the Soviet military catalogue. A massive wave of emigration ensued. Resistance throughout the country included attempted fraternization, sabotage of street signs, defiance of curfews, etc. While the Soviet military had predicted that it would take four days to subdue the country, the resistance held out for almost eight months until diplomatic maneuvers finally circumvented it. It became a high-profile example of civilian-based defense; there were sporadic acts of violence and several protest suicides by self-immolation (the most famous being that of Jan Palach), but no military resistance. Czechoslovakia remained a Soviet satellite state until 1989 when the Velvet Revolution peacefully ended the communist regime; the last Soviet troops left the country in 1991.

After the invasion, Czechoslovakia entered a period known as normalization (Czech: normalizace, Slovak: normalizácia), in which new leaders attempted to restore the political and economic values that had prevailed before Dubček gained control of the KSČ. Gustáv Husák, who replaced Dubček as First Secretary and also became President, reversed almost all of the reforms. The Prague Spring inspired music and literature including the work of Václav Havel, Karel Husa, Karel Kryl and Milan Kundera's novel The Unbearable Lightness of Being.

== Background ==
The process of de-Stalinization in Czechoslovakia had begun under Antonín Novotný in the late 1950s and early 1960s, but had progressed more slowly than in most other states of the Eastern Bloc. Following the lead of Nikita Khrushchev, Novotný proclaimed the "completion of socialism", and the new constitution accordingly adopted the name change from "Czechoslovak Republic" to "Czechoslovak Socialist Republic". The pace of de-Stalinization, however, was sluggish; the rehabilitation of Stalin-era victims, such as those convicted in the Slánský trial, may have been considered as early as 1963, but did not take place until 1967.

In the early 1960s, Czechoslovakia underwent an economic downturn. The Soviet model of industrialization applied poorly to Czechoslovakia since the country was already quite industrialized before World War II while the Soviet model mainly took into account less developed economies. Novotný's attempt at restructuring the economy, the 1965 New Economic Model, spurred increased demand for political reform as well.

The liberalization of 1960s enabled a partial reclaiming of the political and cultural legacy of the First Czechoslovak Republic and its figures such as Tomáš Masaryk, which was ideologically suppressed in the Stalin era as bourgeois nationalist and liberal capitalist. This reclamation can be seen in the success of publications such as Tomáš G. Masaryk (1968) by Milan Machovec.

=== 1963 Liblice Conference ===
In May 1963, some Marxist intellectuals organized the Liblice Conference that discussed Franz Kafka's life, marking the beginning of the cultural democratization of Czechoslovakia which ultimately led to the 1968 Prague Spring. This conference was unique because it symbolized Kafka's rehabilitation in the Eastern Bloc after having been heavily criticized, led to a partial opening up of the regime and influenced the relaxation of censorship. It also had an international impact as a representative from all Eastern Bloc countries were invited to the Conference; only the Soviet Union did not send any representative. This conference had a revolutionary effect and paved the way for the reforms while making Kafka the symbol of the renaissance of Czechoslovak artistic and intellectual freedom.

=== 1967 Writers' Congress ===
As the strict regime eased its rules, the Union of Czechoslovak Writers (Czech: Svaz československých spisovatelů) cautiously began to air discontent. In Literární noviny, the union's previously hard-line communist weekly, members suggested that literature should be independent of the Communist Party doctrine.

In June 1967, a small fraction of the union sympathized with radical socialists, especially Ludvík Vaculík, Milan Kundera, Jan Procházka, Antonín Jaroslav Liehm, Pavel Kohout and Ivan Klíma.

A few months later, at a meeting of Party leaders, it was decided that administrative actions against the writers who openly expressed support of reformation would be taken. Since only a small group of the union held these beliefs, the remaining members were relied upon to discipline their colleagues. Control over Literární noviny and several other publishers was transferred to the Ministry of Culture, and even some leaders of the Party who later became major reformers—including Dubček—endorsed these moves.

== Dubček's rise to power ==
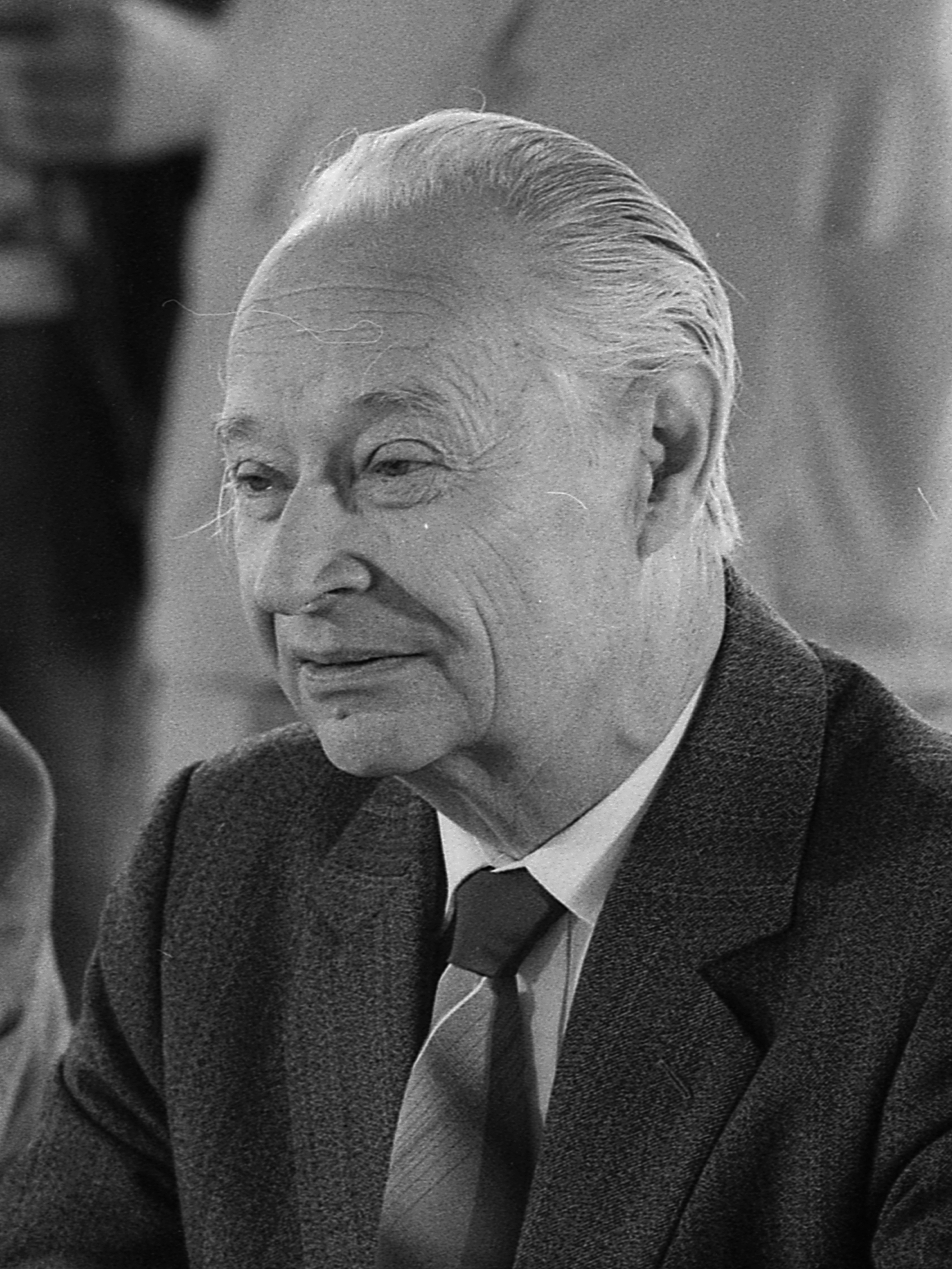
Alexander Dubček

As President Antonín Novotný was losing support, Alexander Dubček, the First Secretary of the Communist Party of Slovakia, and economist Ota Šik challenged him at a meeting of the Central Committee of the Party. Novotný then invited the Secretary General of the Communist Party of Soviet Union, Leonid Brezhnev, to Prague that December, seeking support; Brezhnev, however, was surprised at the extent of the opposition to Novotný and so he rather supported his removal. Dubček replaced Novotný as First Secretary on 5 January 1968. On 22 March, Novotný resigned and was replaced by Ludvík Svoboda, who later gave consent to the reforms.

=== Literární listy ===
Early signs of change were few. In an interview with KSČ Presidium member Josef Smrkovský published in the Party newspaper Rudé Právo with the title "What Lies Ahead", he insisted that Dubček's appointment at the January Plenum would further the goals of socialism and maintain the working class nature of the Party.

However, right after Dubček assumed power, the scholar Eduard Goldstücker became chairman of the Union of Czechoslovak Writers and thus editor-in-chief of Literární noviny, which under Novotný had been filled with party loyalists. Goldstücker tested the boundaries of Dubček's devotion to freedom of the press when on 4 February he appeared in a television interview as the new head of the union. During the interview he openly criticized Novotný, exposing all of Novotný's previously unreported policies and explaining how they were preventing progress in Czechoslovakia.

Goldstücker suffered no repercussions, Dubček instead began to build a sense of trust among the media, the government, and the citizens. It was under Goldstücker that the journal's name was changed to Literární listy, and on 29 February, the Union published the first copy of the censor-free journal. By August, Literární listy had a circulation of 300,000, making it the most published periodical in Europe.

== Socialism with a human face ==
=== Action Programme ===
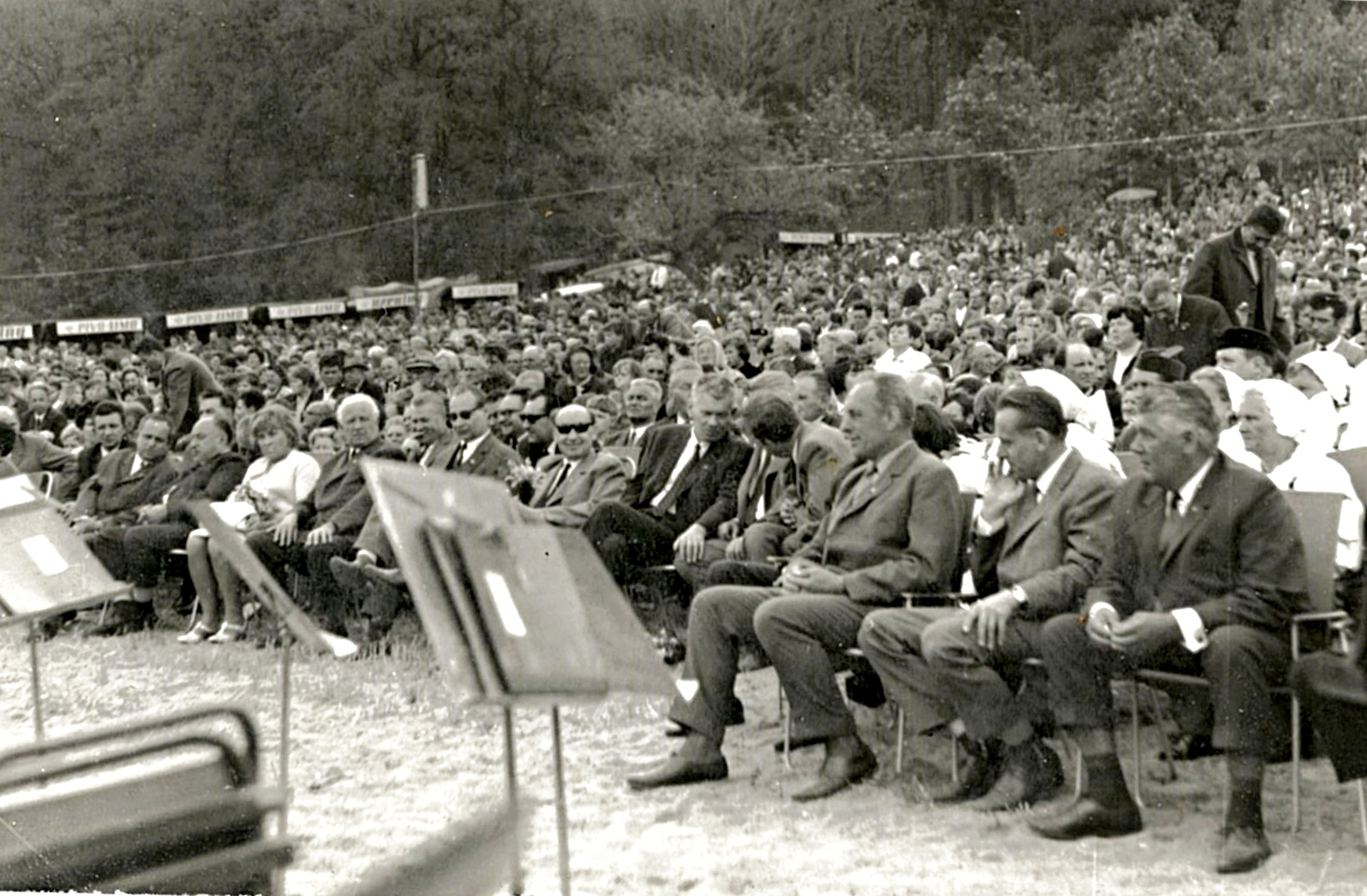
Ceremonial assembly held on 10 May 1968 on Mount Říp with the participation of the highest Czechoslovak leaders (in the front row, centre: President Ludvík Svoboda, Alexander Dubček, Čestmír Císař, Oldřich Černík, Josef Smrkovský and others)

At the 20th anniversary of Czechoslovakia's "Victorious February", Dubček delivered a speech explaining the need for change following the triumph of socialism. He emphasized the need to "enforce the leading role of the party more effectively". In April, Dubček launched an "Action Programme" of liberalizations, which included increasing freedom of the press, freedom of speech, and freedom of movement, with economic emphasis on consumer goods and the possibility of a multiparty government. The programme was based on the view that "Socialism cannot mean only liberation of the working people from the domination of exploiting class relations, but must make more provisions for a fuller life of the personality than any bourgeois democracy." It would limit the power of the secret police and provide for the federalization of the ČSSR into two equal nations. The programme also covered foreign policy, including both the maintenance of good relations with Western countries and cooperation with the Soviet Union and other Eastern Bloc nations. It spoke of a ten-year transition through which democratic elections would be made possible and a new form of democratic socialism would replace the status quo. Those who drafted the Action Programme were careful not to criticize the actions of the post-war Communist regime, only to point out policies that they felt had outlived their usefulness. Although it was stipulated that reform must proceed under KSČ direction, popular pressure mounted to implement reforms immediately. Radical elements became more vocal: anti-Soviet polemics appeared in the press on 26 June 1968, and new unaffiliated political clubs were created. Party conservatives urged repressive measures, but Dubček counselled moderation and re-emphasized KSČ leadership. At the Presidium of the Communist Party of Czechoslovakia in April, Dubček announced a political programme of "socialism with a human face". At the time of the Prague Spring, Czechoslovak exports were declining in competitiveness, and Dubček's reforms planned to solve these troubles by mixing planned and market economies. Dubček continued to stress the importance of economic reform proceeding under Communist Party rule.

=== Media reactions ===
Main instigators of Prague Spring in 1968 (L–R) Oldřich Černík, Alexander Dubček, Ludvík Svoboda and Josef Smrkovský

Freedom of the press opened the door for the first look at Czechoslovakia's past by Czechoslovakia's people. Many of the investigations centered on the country's history under communism, especially in the instance of the Stalinist-period. In another television appearance, Goldstücker presented both doctored and undoctored photographs of former communist leaders who had been purged, imprisoned, or executed and thus erased from communist history. The Writers' Union also formed a committee in April 1968, headed by the poet Jaroslav Seifert, to investigate the persecution of writers after the Communist takeover in February 1948 and rehabilitate the literary figures into the Union, bookstores and libraries, and the literary world. Discussions on the current state of communism and abstract ideas such as freedom and identity were also becoming more common; soon, non-party publications began appearing, such as the trade union daily Práce (Labour). This was also helped by the Journalists' Union, which by March 1968 had already persuaded the Central Publication Board, the government censor, to allow editors to receive uncensored subscriptions to foreign papers, allowing for a more international dialogue around the news.

The press, the radio, and the television also contributed to these discussions by hosting meetings where students and young workers could ask questions of writers such as Goldstücker, Pavel Kohout, and Jan Procházka and political victims such as Josef Smrkovský, Zdeněk Hejzlar, and Gustáv Husák. Television also broadcast meetings between former political prisoners and the communist leaders from the secret police or prisons where they were held. Most importantly, this new self-called freedom and the introduction of television into the lives of everyday Czechoslovak citizens moved the political dialogue from the intellectual to the popular sphere.

=== Soviet reaction ===
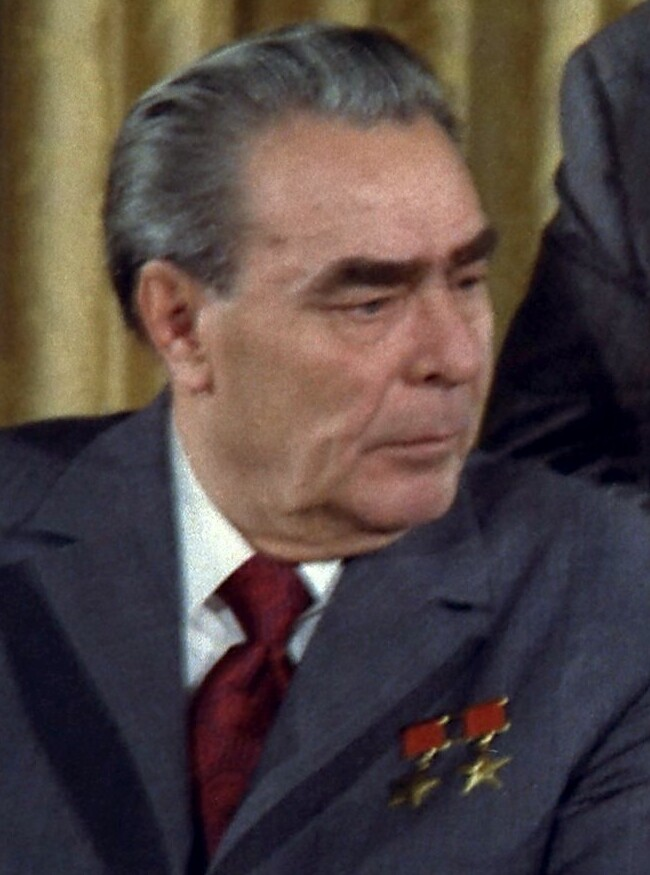
Leonid Brezhnev

Initial reaction within the Communist Bloc was mixed. Hungary's János Kádár was highly supportive of Dubček's appointment in January, but Leonid Brezhnev and the hardliners grew concerned about the reforms, which they feared might weaken the position of the Bloc in the Cold War.

At a meeting in Dresden, East Germany on 23 March, the leaders of the "Warsaw Five" (USSR, Hungary, Poland, Bulgaria and East Germany) questioned the Czechoslovak delegation over the planned reforms, suggesting any talk of "democratization" was a veiled criticism of the Soviet model. The Polish Party leader Władysław Gomułka and János Kádár were less concerned with the reforms themselves than with the growing criticisms levelled by the Czechoslovak media, and worried that the situation might be "similar to ... the 'Hungarian counterrevolution'". Some of the language in the Action Programme may have been chosen to assert that no "counterrevolution" was planned, but Kieran Williams suggests that Dubček was perhaps surprised at, but not resentful of, Soviet suggestions.

In May, the KGB initiated Operation Progress, which involved Soviet agents infiltrating Czechoslovak pro-democratic organizations, such as the Socialist and Christian Democrat parties.

The Soviet leadership tried to stop, or at least limit, the changes in the ČSSR through a series of negotiations. The Soviet Union agreed to bilateral talks with Czechoslovakia from 29 July to 1 August at Čierna nad Tisou, near the Soviet border. The Soviets were represented by almost the full Politburo that met for the first time outside the territory of the Soviet Union; also the Czechoslovak delegation included the full membership of the Presidium, but the main agreements were reached at the meetings of the "fours" – Brezhnev, Alexei Kosygin, Nikolai Podgorny, Mikhail Suslov – Dubček, Ludvík Svoboda, Oldřich Černík, Josef Smrkovský.

At the meeting Dubček defended the proposals of the KSČ's reformist wing while pledging commitment to the Warsaw Pact and Comecon. The KSČ leadership, however, was divided between vigorous reformers (Smrkovský, Černík, and František Kriegel) and hardliners (Vasil Biľak, Drahomír Kolder, and Oldřich Švestka) who adopted an anti-reformist stance.

Brezhnev decided on compromise. The KSČ delegates reaffirmed their loyalty to the Warsaw Pact and promised to curb "anti-socialist" tendencies, prevent the revival of the Czechoslovak Social Democratic Party and control the press more effectively. The Soviets agreed to withdraw their armed forces still in Czechoslovakia after manoeuvres in June and permit the 9 September Party Congress.

On 3 August representatives from the "Warsaw Five" and Czechoslovakia met in Bratislava and signed the Bratislava Declaration. The declaration affirmed unshakable fidelity to Marxism-Leninism and proletarian internationalism, declared an implacable struggle against "bourgeois" ideology and all "anti-socialist" forces. The Soviet Union expressed its intention to intervene in any Warsaw Pact country if a "bourgeois" system—a pluralist system of several political parties representing different factions of the "capitalist classes"—was ever established. After the conference, the Soviet troops left Czechoslovak territory but remained along its borders.

== Soviet invasion ==
As these talks proved unsatisfactory, the Soviets began to consider a military alternative. The Soviet policy of compelling the socialist governments of its satellite states to subordinate their national interests to those of the Eastern Bloc (through military force if needed) became known as the Brezhnev Doctrine. On the night of 20–21 August, Eastern Bloc armies from four Warsaw Pact countries—the Soviet Union, Bulgaria, Poland and Hungary—invaded the ČSSR.

That night, 165,000 troops and 4,600 tanks entered the country. They first occupied the Ruzyně International Airport, where air deployment of more troops was arranged. The Czechoslovak forces were confined to their barracks, which were surrounded until the threat of a counter-attack was assuaged. By the morning of 21 August Czechoslovakia was occupied.

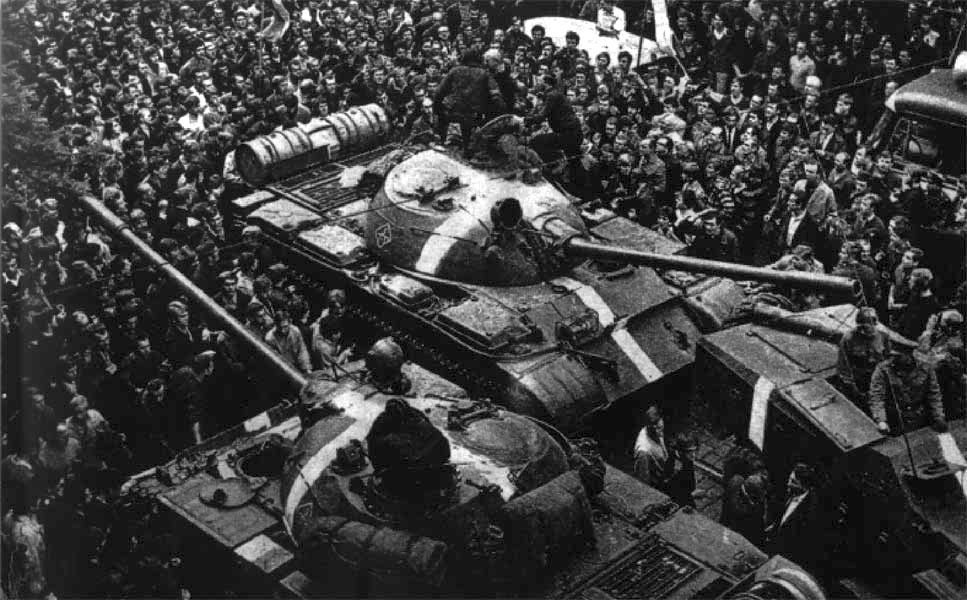
Soviet tanks in Prague, August 1968

Romania and Albania refused to take part in the invasion. Soviet command refrained from drawing upon East German troops for fear of reviving memories of the Nazi invasion in 1938. During the invasion 72 Czechs and Slovaks were killed (19 of those in Slovakia), 266 severely wounded and another 436 slightly injured. Alexander Dubček called upon his people not to resist. Nevertheless, there was scattered resistance in the streets. Road signs in towns were removed or painted over—except for those indicating the way to Moscow. Many small villages renamed themselves "Dubček" or "Svoboda"; thus, without navigational equipment, the invaders were often confused.

On the night of the invasion the Czechoslovak Presidium declared that Warsaw Pact troops had crossed the border without the knowledge of the ČSSR government, but the Soviet Press printed an unsigned request—allegedly by Czechoslovak party and state leaders—for "immediate assistance, including assistance with armed forces". At the 14th KSČ Party Congress (conducted secretly, immediately following the intervention), it was emphasized that no member of the leadership had invited the intervention. More recent evidence suggests that conservative KSČ members (including Biľak, Švestka, Kolder, Indra, and Antonín Kapek) did send a request for intervention to the Soviets. The invasion was followed by a previously unseen wave of emigration, which was stopped shortly thereafter. An estimated 70,000 citizens fled the country immediately with an eventual total of some 300,000.

Until recently there was some uncertainty as to what provocation, if any, occurred to make the Warsaw Pact armies invade. Preceding the invasion was a rather calm period without any major events taking place in Czechoslovakia.

=== Reactions to the invasion ===
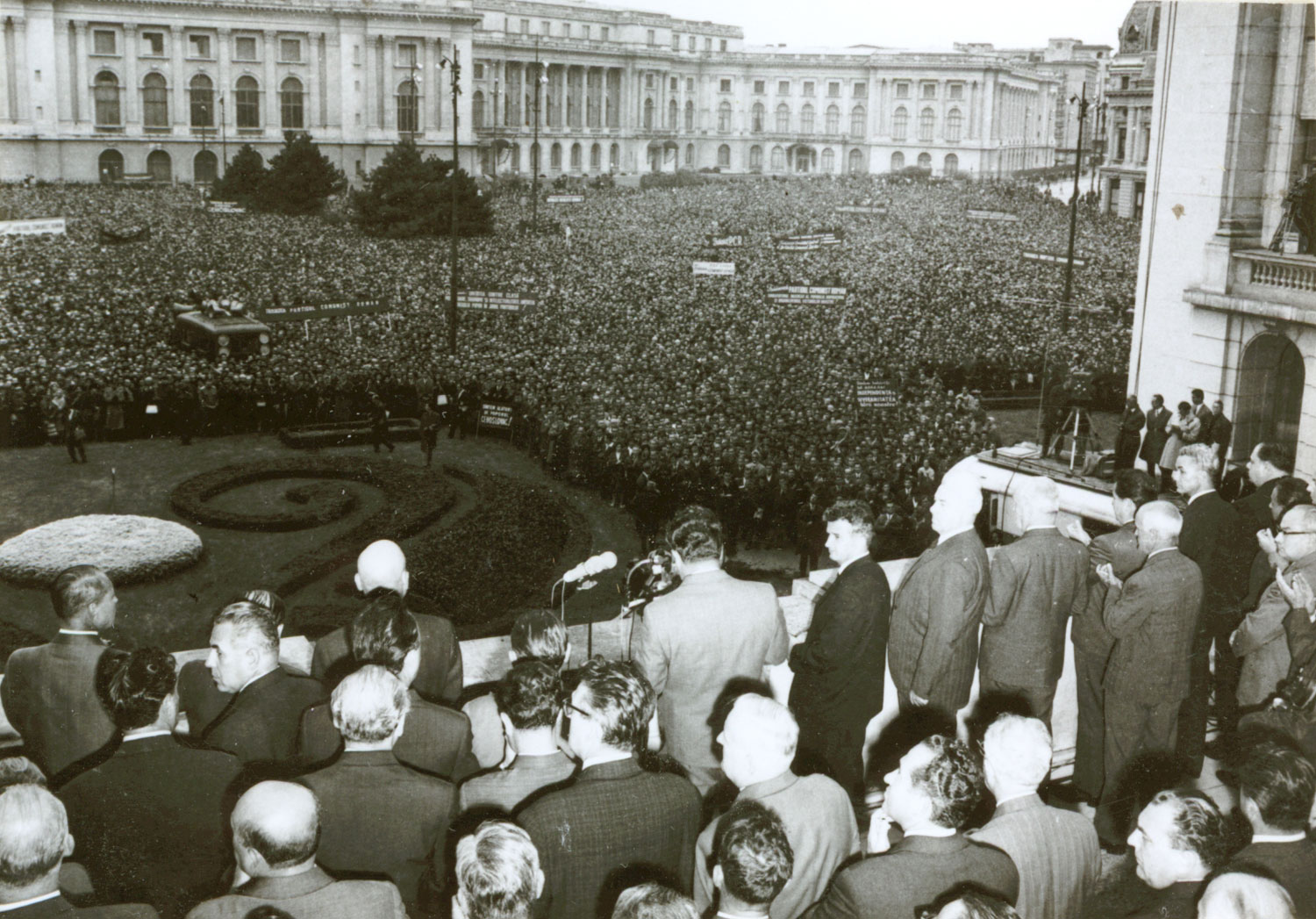
Romanian Prime Secretary Nicolae Ceauşescu gives a speech critical of the invasion, in front of a crowd in Bucharest, 21 August 1968

In Czechoslovakia, especially in the week following the invasion, popular opposition was expressed in numerous spontaneous acts of nonviolent resistance. Civilians purposely gave wrong directions to invading soldiers, while others identified and followed cars belonging to the secret police. On 16 January 1969, student Jan Palach set himself on fire in Prague's Wenceslas Square to protest against the renewed suppression of free speech.

The generalized resistance caused the Soviet Union to abandon its original plan to oust the First Secretary. Dubček, who had been arrested on the night of 20 August, was taken to Moscow for negotiations. There, under heavy psychological pressure from Soviet politicians, Dubček and all the highest-ranked leaders but František Kriegel signed the Moscow Protocol. It was agreed that Dubček would remain in office and a programme of moderate reform would continue.

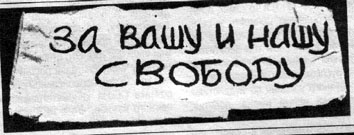
Protest banner in Russian reading "For your freedom and ours"

On 25 August citizens of the Soviet Union who did not approve of the invasion protested in Red Square; seven protesters opened banners with anti-invasion slogans. The demonstrators were brutally beaten and arrested by security forces, and later punished by a secret tribunal; the protest was dubbed "anti-Soviet" and several people were detained in psychiatric hospitals.

A more pronounced effect took place in Romania, where Nicolae Ceaușescu, General Secretary of the Romanian Communist Party, already a staunch opponent of Soviet influences and a self-declared Dubček supporter, gave a public speech in Bucharest on the day of the invasion, depicting Soviet policies in harsh terms. Albania withdrew from the Warsaw Pact in opposition, calling the invasion an act of "social imperialism". In Finland, a country under some Soviet political influence, the occupation caused a major scandal.

Like the Italian and French Communist parties, the majority of the Communist Party of Finland denounced the occupation. Nonetheless, Finnish president Urho Kekkonen was the first Western politician to officially visit Czechoslovakia after August 1968; he received the highest Czechoslovak honours from the hands of President Ludvík Svoboda, on 4 October 1969. A schism occurred between the East German communist Socialist Unity Party of Germany and the Icelandic Socialist Party because of the latter's disapproval of the invasion and occupation of Czechoslovakia, causing relations between Iceland and East Germany to deteriorate. The Portuguese communist secretary-general Álvaro Cunhal was one of few political leaders from western Europe to have supported the invasion for being counter-revolutionary, along with the Luxembourg party and conservative factions of the Greek party.

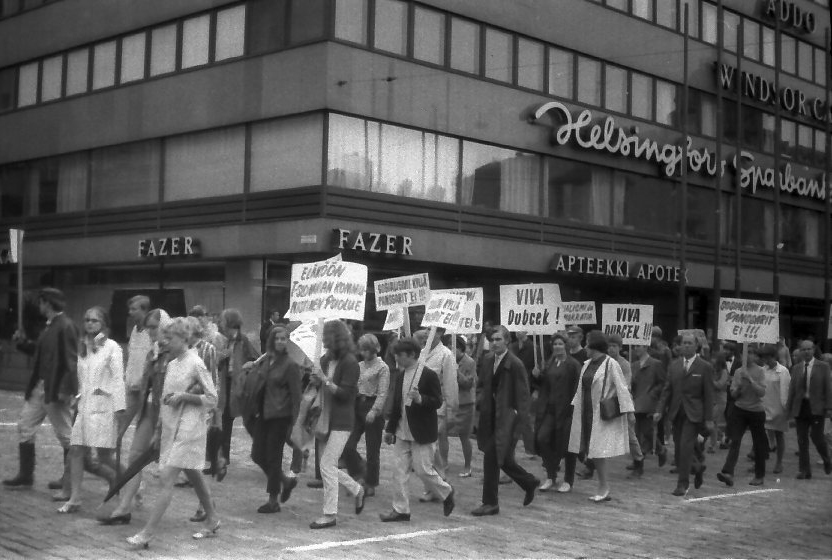
Helsinki demonstration against the invasion of Czechoslovakia

Most countries offered only vocal criticism following the invasion. The night of the invasion, Canada, Denmark, France, Paraguay, the United Kingdom, and the United States requested a meeting of the United Nations Security Council. At the meeting, the Czechoslovak ambassador Jan Mužík denounced the invasion. Soviet ambassador Jacob Malik insisted the Warsaw Pact actions were "fraternal assistance" against "antisocial forces".

The British government strongly condemned the Soviet invasion of Czechoslovakia, although it cautiously avoided making any diplomatic moves that may have provoked a Soviet counter-response and a jeopardisation of détente. The United Kingdom's foreign policy toward the Soviet Union was minimally impacted in the long-term, and quickly reverted to the status quo that existed prior to the Prague Spring following the brief period of intense criticism.

One of the nations that most vehemently condemned the invasion was China, which objected furiously to the so-called "Brezhnev Doctrine" that declared the Soviet Union alone had the right to determine what nations were properly Communist and could invade those Communist nations whose communism did not meet the Kremlin's approval. Mao Zedong saw the Brezhnev Doctrine as the ideological basis for a Soviet invasion of China, and launched a massive propaganda campaign condemning the invasion of Czechoslovakia, despite his own earlier opposition to the Prague Spring. Speaking at a banquet at the Romanian embassy in Beijing on 23 August 1968, the Chinese Premier Zhou Enlai denounced the Soviet Union for "fascist politics, great power chauvinism, national egoism and social imperialism", going on to compare the invasion of Czechoslovakia to the American war in Vietnam and more pointedly to the policies of Adolf Hitler towards Czechoslovakia in 1938–39. Zhou ended his speech with a barely veiled call for the people of Czechoslovakia to wage guerrilla war against the Red Army.

The next day, several countries suggested a United Nations resolution condemning the intervention and calling for immediate withdrawal. Eventually, a UN vote was taken with ten members supporting the motion; Algeria, India, and Pakistan abstained; the USSR (with veto power) and Hungary opposed. Canadian delegates immediately introduced another motion asking for a UN representative to travel to Prague and work toward the release of the imprisoned Czechoslovak leaders.

By 26 August, a new Czechoslovak representative requested the whole issue be removed from the Security Council's agenda. Shirley Temple Black visited Prague in August 1968 to prepare for becoming the US Ambassador for reformed Czechoslovakia. However, after the 21 August invasion, she became part of a U.S. Embassy-organized convoy of vehicles that evacuated U.S. citizens from the country. In August 1989, she returned to Prague as U.S. Ambassador, three months before the Velvet Revolution that ended 41 years of Communist rule.

The United States, West Germany and NATO maintained a low-key response to the invasion. After 1968 the U.S. recognized Soviet dominance in Eastern Europe, a development that was in the interests of the United States according to some analysts.

== Aftermath ==
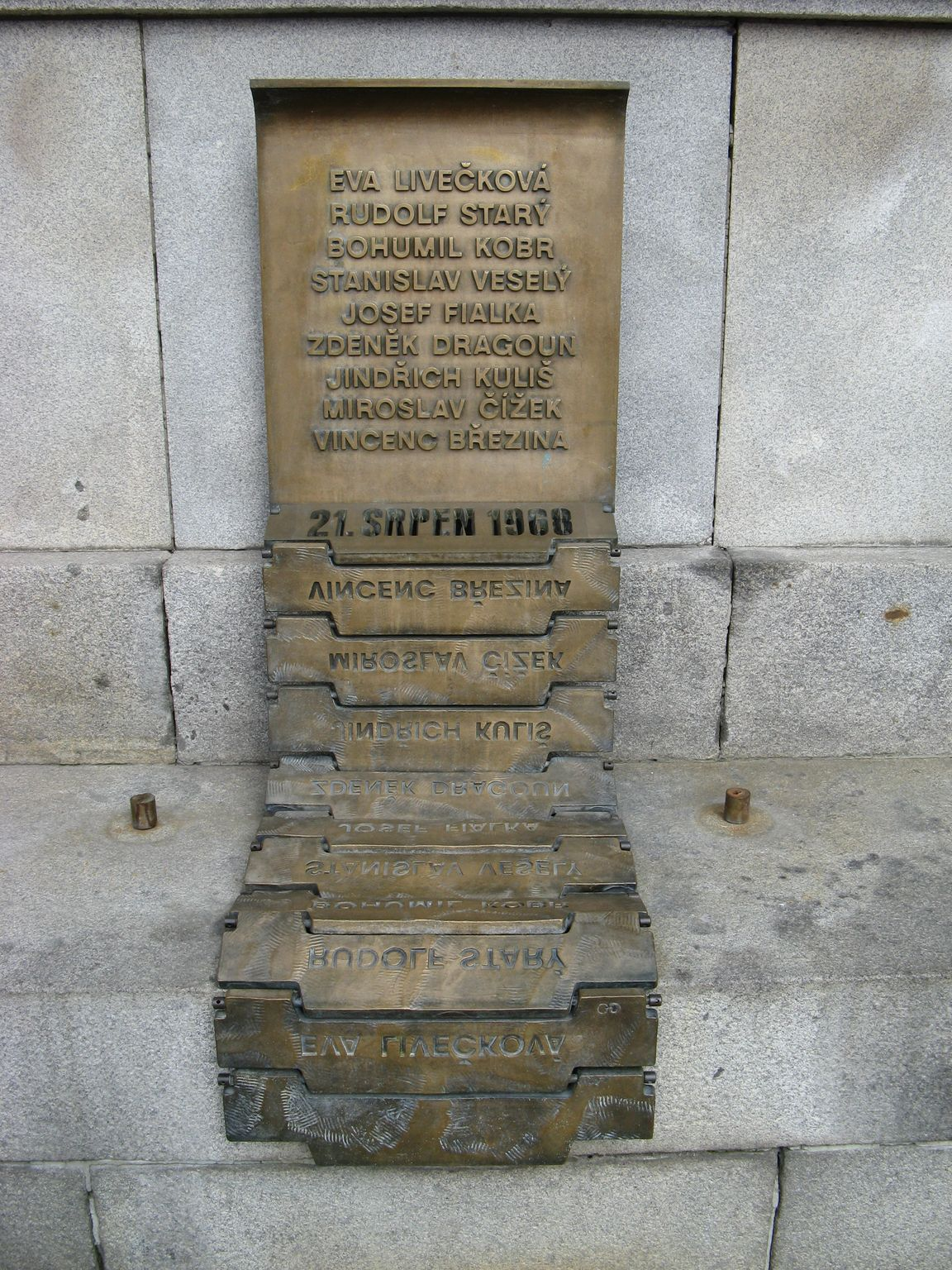
Memorial to the victims of the invasion, located in Liberec

In April 1969, Dubček was replaced as first secretary by Gustáv Husák, and a period of "normalization" began. Dubček was expelled from the KSČ and given a job as a forestry official.

Husák reversed Dubček's reforms, purged the party of its liberal members, and dismissed from public office professional and intellectual elites who openly expressed disagreement with the political transformation. (Many of those purged would later become the dissidents of Czechoslovak underground culture, active in Charter 77 and related movements which eventually met success in the Velvet Revolution.) Husák worked to reinstate the power of the police and strengthen ties with the rest of the Communist bloc. He also sought to re-centralize the economy, as a considerable amount of freedom had been granted to industries during the Prague Spring. Commentary on politics was forbidden in mainstream media, and political statements by anyone not considered to have "full political trust" were also banned. The only significant change that survived was the federalization of the country, which created the Czech Socialist Republic and the Slovak Socialist Republic in 1969.

In 1987, the Soviet leader Mikhail Gorbachev acknowledged that his liberalizing policies of glasnost and perestroika owed a great deal to Dubček's "socialism with a human face". When asked what the difference was between the Prague Spring and Gorbachev's own reforms, a Foreign Ministry spokesman replied, "Nineteen years."

Dubček lent his support to the Velvet Revolution of December 1989. After the collapse of the Communist regime that month, Dubček became chairman of the federal assembly under the Havel administration. He later led the Social Democratic Party of Slovakia, and spoke against the dissolution of Czechoslovakia before his death in November 1992.

=== Normalization and censorship ===
The Warsaw Pact invasion included attacks on media establishments, such as Radio Prague and Czechoslovak Television, almost immediately after the initial tanks rolled into Prague on 21 August 1968. While both the radio station and the television station managed to hold out for at least enough time for initial broadcasts of the invasion, what the Soviets did not attack by force they attacked by reenacting party censorship.. The Austrian ORF distributed smuggled footage of the invasion around the world; Czechoslovaks were among millions in the Eastern Bloc that watched the footage from television signal overspill.

In reaction to the invasion, on 28 August 1968, all Czechoslovak publishers agreed to halt production of newspapers for the day to allow for a "day of reflection" for the editorial staffs. Writers and reporters agreed with Dubček to support a limited reinstitution of the censorship office, as long as the institution was to only last three months. Finally, by September 1968, the Czechoslovak Communist Party plenum was held to instate the new censorship law. In the words of the Moscow-approved resolution, "The press, radio, and television are first of all the instruments for carrying into life the policies of the Party and state."

While that was not yet the end of the media's self-called freedom after the Prague Spring, it was the beginning of the end. During November, the Presidium, under Husak, declared that the Czechoslovak press could not make any negative remarks about the Soviet invaders or they would risk violating the agreement they had come to at the end of August. When the weeklies Reporter and Politika responded harshly to this threat, even going so far as to not so subtly criticize the Presidium itself in Politika, the government banned Reporter for a month, suspended Politika indefinitely, and prohibited any political programs from appearing on the radio or television.

The intellectuals were stuck at an impasse; they recognized the government's increasing normalization, but they were unsure whether to trust that the measures were only temporary or demand more. For example, still believing in Dubcek's promises for reform, Milan Kundera published the article "Cesky udel" ("Our Czech Destiny") in Literarni listy on 19 December. He wrote: "People who today are falling into depression and defeatism, commenting that there are not enough guarantees, that everything could end badly, that we might again end up in a marasmus of censorship and trials, that this or that could happen, are simply weak people, who can live only in illusions of certainty."

In March 1969, however, the new Soviet-backed Czechoslovak government instituted full censorship, effectively ending the hopes that normalization would lead back to the freedoms enjoyed during the Prague Spring. A declaration was presented to the Presidium condemning the media as co-conspirators against the Soviet Union and the Warsaw Pact in their support of Dubcek's liberalization measures. Finally, on 2 April 1969, the government adopted measures "to secure peace and order" through even stricter censorship, forcing the people of Czechoslovakia to wait until the thawing of Eastern Europe for the return of a free media.

Former students from Prague, including Constantine Menges, and Czech refugees from the crisis, who were able to escape or resettle in Western Countries continued to advocate for human rights, religious liberty, freedom of speech and political asylum for Czech political prisoners and dissidents. Many raised concerns about the Soviet Union and Soviet Army's continued military occupation of Czechoslovakia in the 1970s and 1980s, before the fall of the Berlin Wall and the collapse of Communism in Moscow and Eastern Europe.

=== Cultural impact ===
The Prague Spring deepened the disillusionment of many Western leftists with Soviet views. It contributed to the growth of Eurocommunist ideas in Western communist parties, which sought greater distance from the Soviet Union and eventually led to the dissolution of many of these groups. A decade later, a period of Chinese political liberalization became known as the Beijing Spring. It also partly influenced the Croatian Spring in Communist Yugoslavia. In a 1993 Czech survey, 60% of those surveyed had a personal memory linked to the Prague Spring while another 30% were familiar with the events in another form. The demonstrations and regime changes taking place in North Africa and the Middle East from December 2010 have frequently been referred to as an "Arab Spring".

The event has been referenced in popular music, including the music of Karel Kryl, Luboš Fišer's Requiem, and Karel Husa's Music for Prague 1968. The Israeli song "Prague", written by Shalom Hanoch and performed by Arik Einstein at the Israel Song Festival of 1969, was a lamentation on the fate of the city after the Soviet invasion and mentions Jan Palach's Self-immolation. "They Can't Stop The Spring", a song by Irish journalist and songwriter John Waters, represented Ireland in the Eurovision Song Contest in 2007. Waters has described it as "a kind of Celtic celebration of the Eastern European revolutions and their eventual outcome", quoting Dubček's alleged comment: "They may crush the flowers, but they can't stop the Spring." "The Old Man's Back Again (Dedicated to the Neo-Stalinist Regime)", a song featured in the American-English singer-songwriter Scott Walker's fifth solo album Scott 4 also refers to the invasion.

The Prague Spring is featured in several works of literature. Milan Kundera set his novel The Unbearable Lightness of Being during the Prague Spring. It follows the repercussions of increased Soviet presence and the dictatorial police control of the population. A film version was released in 1988. The Liberators, by Viktor Suvorov, is an eyewitness description of the 1968 invasion of Czechoslovakia, from the point of view of a Soviet tank commander. Rock 'n' Roll, a play by award-winning Czech-born English playwright Tom Stoppard, references the Prague Spring, as well as the 1989 Velvet Revolution. Heda Margolius Kovály also ends her memoir Under a Cruel Star with a first hand account of the Prague Spring and the subsequent invasion, and her reflections upon these events.

In film there has been an adaptation of The Unbearable Lightness of Being, and also the film Pelíšky by director Jan Hřebejk and screenwriter Petr Jarchovský, which depicts the events of the Prague Spring and ends with the invasion by the Soviet Union and their allies. The Czech musical film Rebelové by Filip Renč also depicts the events, the invasion and subsequent wave of emigration.

The number 68 has become iconic in the former Czechoslovakia. Ice hockey player Jaromír Jágr, whose grandfather died in prison during the rebellion, wears the number because of the importance of the year in Czechoslovak history. A former publishing house based in Toronto, 68 Publishers, that published books by exiled Czech and Slovak authors, took its name from the event.

== Memory ==
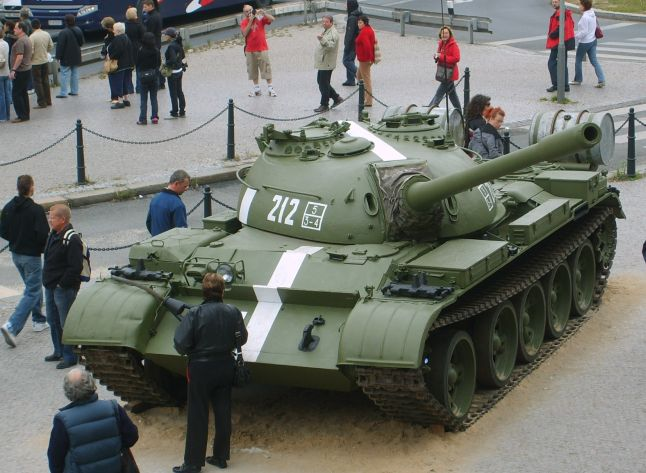
Soviet tank, exhibited in Prague in remembrance (2008) of the Prague Spring

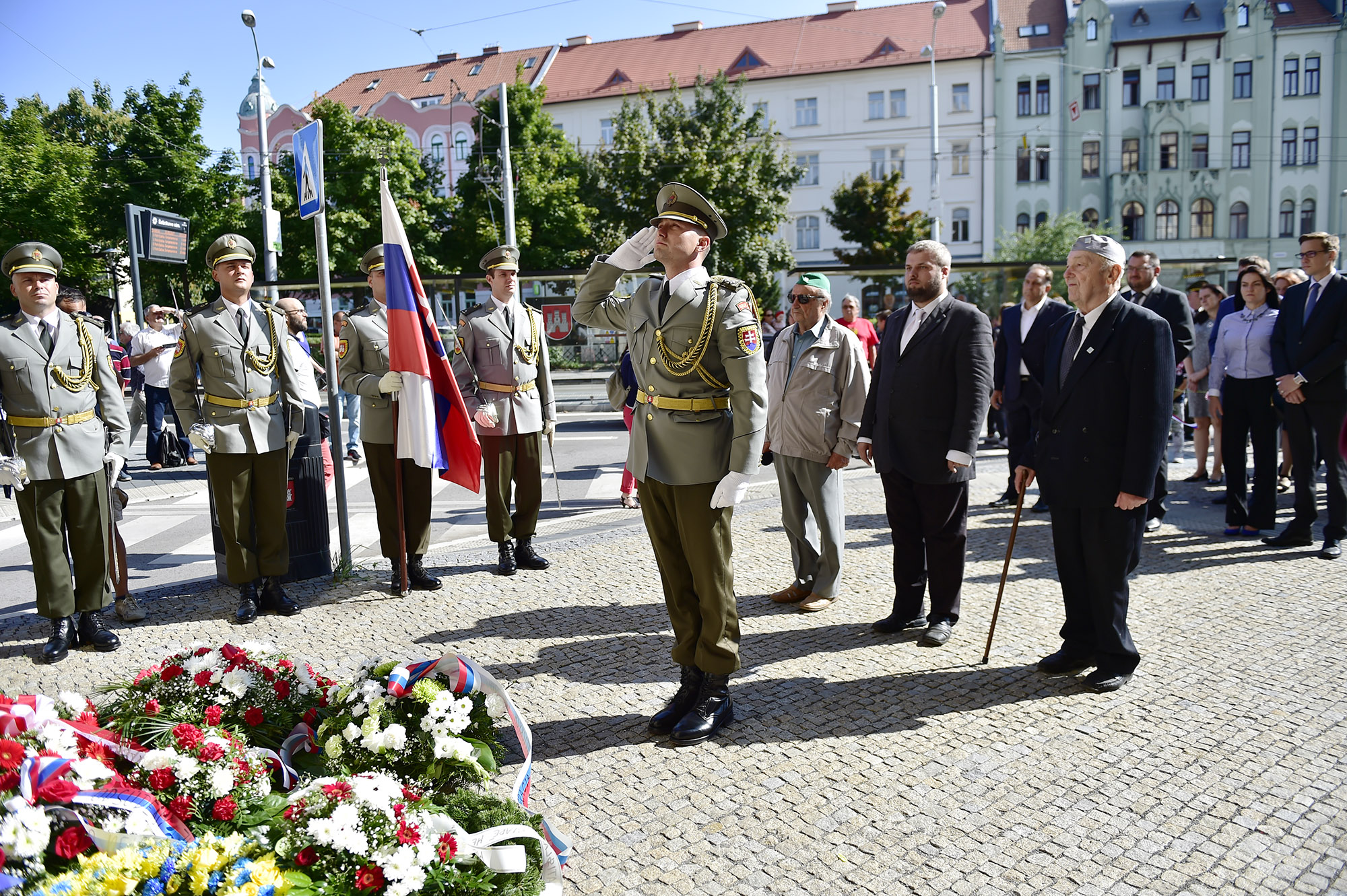
Commemorative event (2017) in Bratislava, Slovakia

=== Places and historical sites ===
The photographs that were taken in Vinohradská Avenue and Wenceslas Square are widely represented in the photographic archive of the 1968 invasion while other sites of protests are missing. The memory of the Prague Spring is marked by the Czech Republic's and Slovakia's desire to avoid unpleasant collective memories leading to a process of historical amnesia and narrative whitewashing. Photographs taken by Josef Koudelka portray memories of the invasion such as a memorial to the victims set up in Wenceslas Square. There are many omnipresent signs of memorial of the Soviet invasion in the city of Prague.

During the invasion, protesters set up several memorials to record the location of the victims' death. The Jan Palach memorial is a monument remembering the suicide of a student in 1969. This place is often called the "boulevard of history". Palach was the first to kill himself in Wenceslas Square but was not the last, he was belonging to a student pact of resistance. There is also (at Újezd, at the bottom of Petrin hill) the memorial for the victims of communism in Prague: a narrowing staircase along which seven male bronze silhouettes descend. The first one, the one at the bottom, is complete, while the others gradually disappear. It aims at representing the same person at different phases of the destruction caused by communist ideology.

=== Conflicted memories ===
The Prague Spring has deeply marked the history of communism in Eastern Europe even though its outcomes were modest. Rather than remembering the cultural democratization, the opening of the press and its impact on the emergence of a new form of socialism, history textbooks consider Prague Spring as one of the major crises of Socialism in the Soviet bloc. The memory has acquired a negative significance as marking disillusion of political hopes within Eastern European communism. Indeed, long hidden and rejected from the collective memory, the Prague Spring of 1968 is rarely commemorated in Prague and is often considered a painful defeat, a symbol of disappointed hope and surrender that heralds twenty years of 'normalisation'. It was not until the 2000s, following the publication of texts dating from 1968, such as Milan Kundera's "Český úděl" ("The Czech Fate") and Václav Havel's "Český úděl?" published in 2007 in the weekly magazine Literární Noviny (52/1), that the debate on the Prague Spring resumed. Indeed, the posterity of the Prague Spring remains first and foremost the memory of the military intervention of the Warsaw Pact as well as the failure of reform within a communist regime, which definitely discredited the Dubcekian "revisionist" perspective in the East. The memory of the Prague Spring is thus largely obscured and often overviewed. Indeed, the Prague Spring also deeply impacted the Czech society and should also be remembered for the cultural momentum that accompanied and illustrated this movement, of which there are still films, novels, and plays. The Prague Spring also influenced a renewal of the Prague artistic and cultural scene as well as a liberalization of society which deeply marked the following years. The 1960s indeed saw the emergence of a major shift in Czechoslovakia with cultural changes and movement coming from the West, notably rock music and sub-cultural movements which are the symbol of cultural renewal for Czechoslovakia. The Czech sixties were thus a process of emancipation of culture from the constraints of existing political structures and were the prelude to the upheavals of 1968. In fact, the regime's political crisis did not begin with Dubcek's election as party leader on 5 January 1968, but with the break-up speeches delivered at the Writers' Congress in June 1967 by Ludvík Vaculík, Milan Kundera and Antonín Liehm. In addition, the revitalization of society was also an essential component of the Prague Spring. Indeed, the great achievements of the Prague Spring, i. e. the abolition of censorship, the restoration of individual and collective freedoms... have revitalized society, which has begun to express itself more freely. Although the Prague Spring only restored what had existed thirty years earlier in Czechoslovakia, the spring of 1968 had a profound and long-lasting impact on the society.

Recently, the anniversary of the 50 years of the conflict raised the question of the memory of the Prague Spring. The European Commission Vice-president Maroš Šefčovič, himself a Slovak, reminded us on the occasion that "we should never tolerate a breach of international law, crushing people's legitimate yearning for freedom and democracy". The European justice commissioner Věra Jourová also made a speech. However, the memory is still very conflicted as demonstrated when the Czech Republic's pro-Russian President Miloš Zeman refused to attend any ceremony remembering the Prague Spring and didn't give any speech in memory of the numerous deaths.

The memory of the Prague Spring is also transmitted through testimonies of former Czechoslovak citizens. In a 2018 article, Radio Free Europe collected testimonies of four women who witnessed the Warsaw Pact troops invasion and bravely acted. Stanislava Draha who volunteered to help some of the 500 wounded testifies says that the invasion had a major impact on her life. Besides, Vera Homolova, a radio reporter broadcasting the invasion from a covert studio testifies "I experienced the Soviet-led troops shooting recklessly into the Czechoslovak Radio's building, into windows." In the aftermath, Vera Roubalova, who reacted as a student to the occupation by demonstrating posters, that tensions were still present towards the countries that occupied Czechoslovakia. On the night of 20–21 August, 137 Czechoslovaks died during the invasion.

== See also ==
- Hungarian Revolution of 1956
- Croatian Spring
- Velvet Revolution
- April 9 tragedy
- Lennon Wall
