= Bratislava Declaration =

1968 political document

The Bratislava Declaration was the result of the conference held in Bratislava on 3 August 1968 by the representatives of the Communist and Worker's parties of Bulgaria, Hungary, East Germany, Poland, the USSR, and Czechoslovakia. The declaration was a response to the Prague Spring. It affirmed an unshakable fidelity to Marxism–Leninism and proletarian internationalism, and declared an implacable struggle against "bourgeois" ideology and all "anti-socialist" forces. The Soviet Union also expressed its intention to intervene in any Warsaw Pact country if a "bourgeois" system—a pluralist system of several political parties—were ever established.

The Bratislava Declaration and Roadmap of 2016 is an unrelated document that was the outcome of an informal meeting of the 27 heads of state or government of European Union countries in Bratislava on 16 September 2016, chaired by Donald Tusk.
