= Government structure of Communist Czechoslovakia =

The government of Czechoslovakia under Marxism–Leninism was in theory a dictatorship of the proletariat. In practice, it was a one-party dictatorship run by the Communist Party of Czechoslovakia, the KSC.

In the 1970s and 1980s the government structure was based on the amended 1960 Constitution of Czechoslovakia, which defined the country as the Czechoslovak Socialist Republic. The Constitutional Act on the Czechoslovak Federation (1968) transformed the country into a federal state and stipulated the creation of two constituent republics, with separate government structures for the Czech Socialist Republic, located in Prague, and the Slovak Socialist Republic, situated in Bratislava. These republic governments shared responsibility with the federal government in areas such as planning, finance, currency, price control, agriculture and food, transportation, labor, wages, social policy, and the media. The central government, located in Prague, had exclusive jurisdiction over foreign policy, international relations, defense, federal stockpiles, federal legislation and administration, and the federal judicial system.

Government institutions in Czechoslovakia performed legislative, executive, and judicial functions. The Constitution clearly defined the responsibilities for making and implementing policy held by each branch of government. In reality, however, all decisions of state were made by the Communist Party of Czechoslovakia. Government bodies existed purely, to administer the party program.

== Legislative branch ==
The highest legislative institution was the Federal Assembly, which Chapter 3 of the 1960 Constitution recognized as "the supreme organ of state power and the sole statewide legislative body." The Federal Assembly was divided into two equal chambers, the Chamber of the People and the Chamber of the Nations. The Chamber of the People reflected a system of proportional representation: in 1986 it included 134 deputies from the Czech Socialist Republic and 66 deputies from the Slovak Socialist Republic. The Chamber of Nations had 150 members, 75 from each republic. Deputies were selected through popular elections and served five year terms of office; all 350 served concurrently.

After an election each chamber met to select its own presidium consisting of three to six members. Together, the chambers elected the forty-member Presidium of the Federal Assembly, which served as the legislative authority when the assembly was not in session. A joint session of the Federal Assembly selected its chairman and vice chairman. Alois Indra served as chairman from 1971 to 1989.

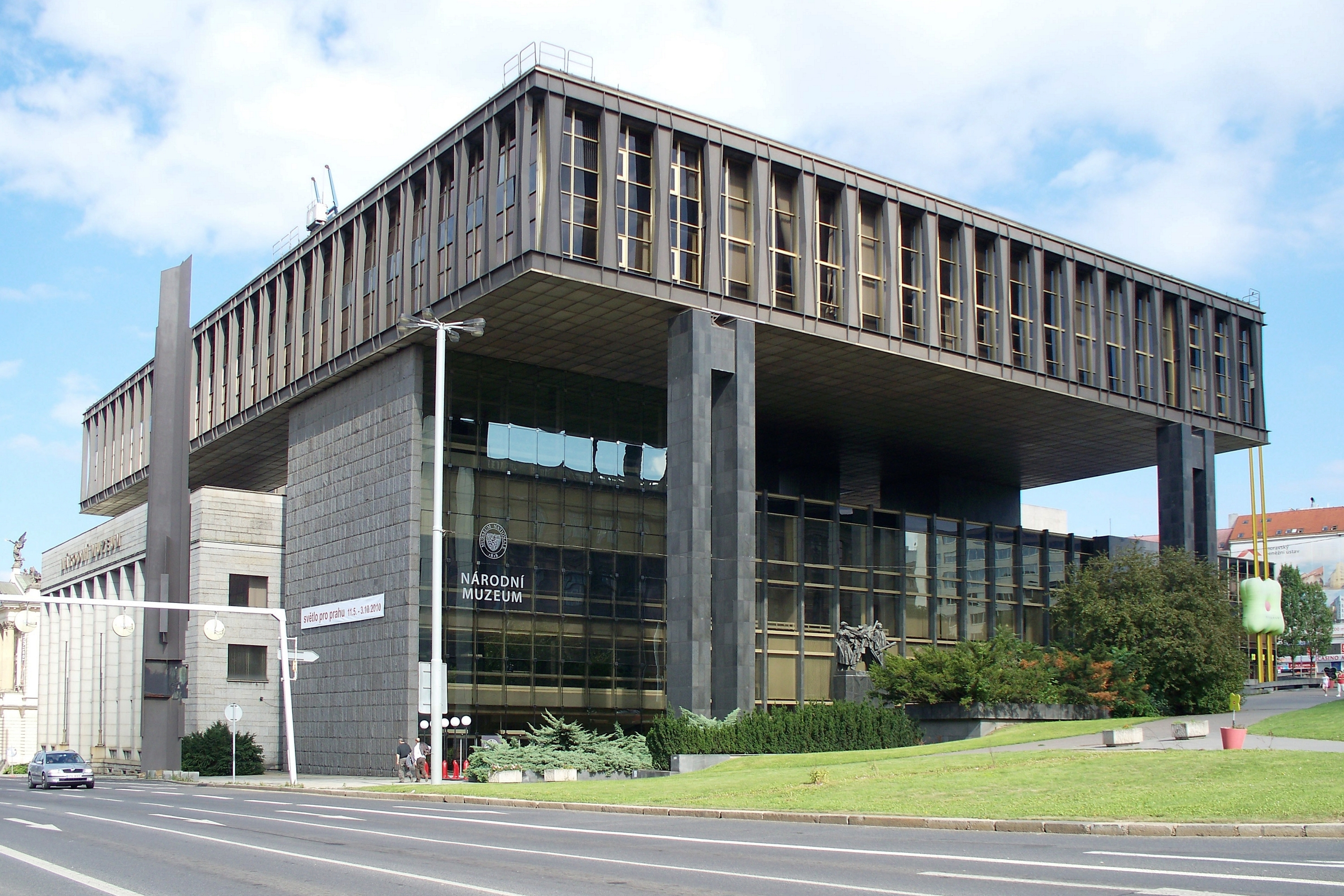
Federal Assembly, Prague

The Federal Assembly met in regular session at least twice a year, in the spring and fall. Legislation presented to the assembly at these sessions had to be approved by both chambers and in some cases requires a majority vote by both the Czech and the Slovak deputies in the Chamber of the Nations. Constitutionally, the Federal Assembly had exclusive jurisdiction in all matters of foreign policy, fundamental matters of domestic policy, the economic plan, and supervision of the executive branch of government. In practice, as was the case in all other Communist countries, its function was largely confined to rubber-stamping decisions already made by the KSC. Laws in Czechoslovakia were decided at the highest level of the KSC. They were then presented to the Federal Assembly for approval, which almost always came unanimously.

== Executive branch ==
Flag of the president of Czechoslovakia in 1960–1990

The executive branch of government consisted of the president, the prime minister, a number of deputy prime ministers, and the federal ministers.

According to the 1960 Constitution, the president was elected by the Federal Assembly to a five-year term of office. In practice, the president was first selected by the KSC leadership and then "officially" voted into office by the Federal Assembly. As head of state, the president represented the nation in diplomatic affairs, received and appointed envoys, convened the Federal Assembly, and signed laws into force. He was commander in chief of the armed forces and was empowered to appoint or remove the premier, other members of the executive, and other high civilian and military officials. There was no vice president; rather, the Constitution provided that if the presidential office became vacant, the premier would be entrusted with the president's duties until the Federal Assembly elects a new president.

The prime minister, the deputy prime ministers (numbering ten in 1987), and the federal cabinet ministers were collectively termed "the government," which is constitutionally defined as "the supreme executive organ of state power." All were chosen by the Central Committee of the KSC and formally appointed by the president. If both chambers of the Federal Assembly voted to censure any or all members of the government, the president was obliged to remove those members.

The premier, deputy premiers, and ministers collectively formed the Presidium of the Government of the Czechoslovak Socialist Republic. This Presidium supervised and controlled the activities of the federal ministries, commissions, and other departments. These Presidium functions appeared to correspond to the purpose of the government as stated in the Constitution, which was to ensure the implementation of laws enacted in the Federal Assembly and to coordinate, direct, and control activities in the federal ministries and other federal offices.

Federal ministers were important administrators, but they lacked the political weight of their counterparts in most non-communist countries. The number of ministries and the division of responsibilities among them have varied over time. In August 1986 there were thirteen federal ministries: agriculture and food; communication; electrotechnical industry; finance; foreign affairs; foreign trade; fuels and power; general engineering; interior; labor and social affairs; metallurgy and heavy engineering; national defense; and transportation. In addition, five individuals held positions that granted them ministerial status. These included the minister-chairmen of the Federal Price Office and the People's Surveillance Commission, the chairman of the State Planning Commission, and the minister-deputy chairmen of the State Planning Commission and the State Commission for Research and Development and Investment Planning. These ministerial and ministerial-level positions within the government paralleled similar organs within the KSC, where policy was actually formed before it was enacted by federal government officials.

== Judicial branch ==
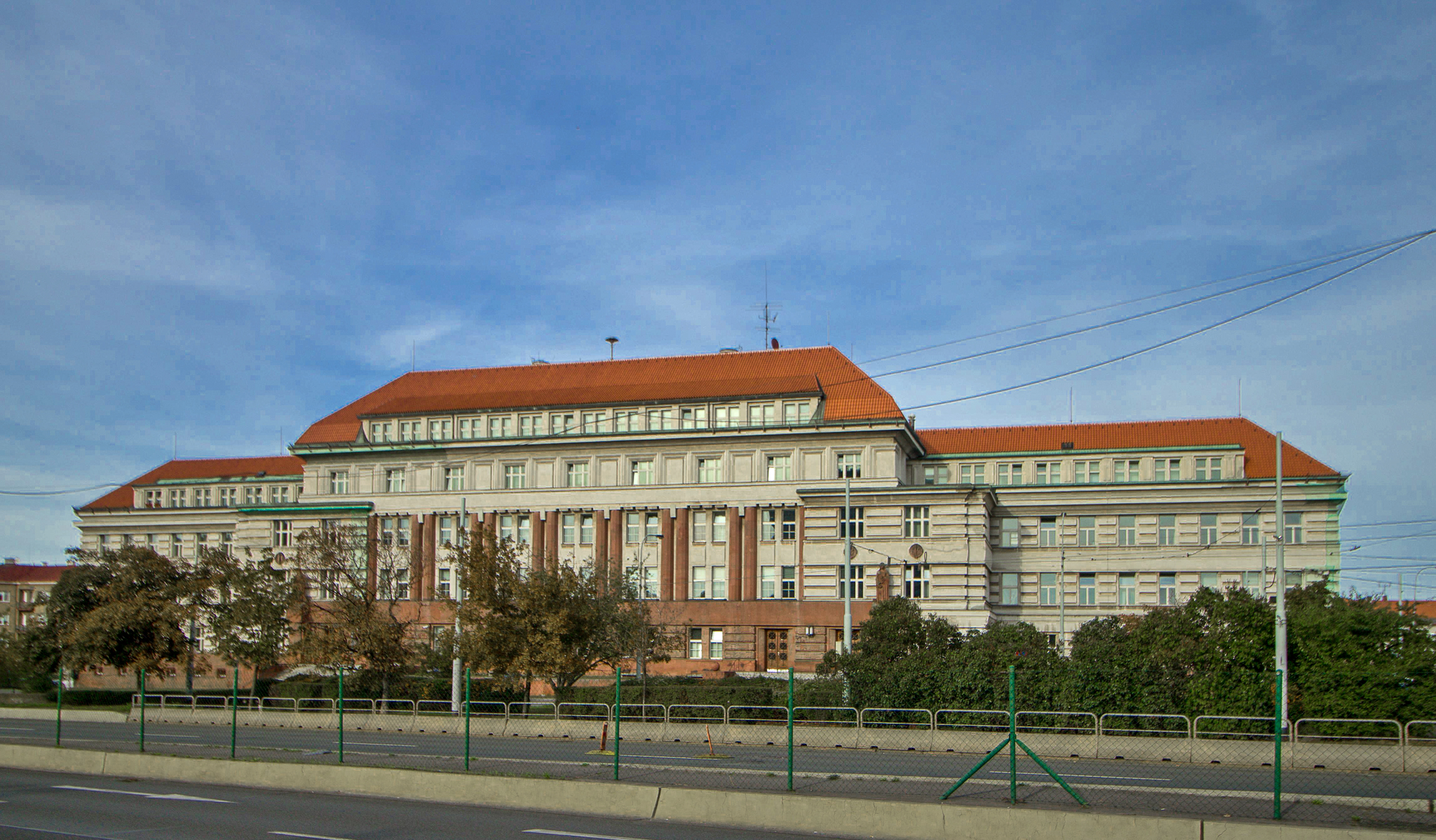
Palace of Justice on Heroes' Square in Prague

The highest judicial organ at the federal level was the Supreme Court of Czechoslovakia. Supreme Court judges were elected by the Federal Assembly to serve ten-year terms of office. The Federal Assembly also selected a chairman and vice chairman of the Supreme Court. If the chairman was from the Czech Socialist Republic, the vice chairman must have been from the Slovak Socialist Republic, and vice versa. The two republics must have been represented by an equal number of Supreme Court judges. Petitions for breach of law against decisions of the republic supreme courts were heard in the Supreme Court at the federal level. In addition to serving as the nation's final court of appeals, the Supreme Court of Czechoslovakia examined the legality of decisions of the federal government and, in general, ensured the uniform interpretation of the laws. It also heard requests for recognition of foreign judgments in Czechoslovakia. The decisions of the Supreme Court emanate from "benches", which comprised the Supreme Court chairman and selected professional judges. The Supreme Court also acted as the final court of appeal in military cases, although below the Supreme Court level military cases are handled in military courts, which were distinct from civil courts.

Below the Supreme Court of Czechoslovakia were the Supreme Court of the Czech Socialist Republic and the Supreme Court of the Slovak Socialist Republic. Below the supreme court of each republic were regional and district courts:

- District courts (one in each administrative district) were the courts of general civil jurisdiction and limited criminal jurisdiction and are presided over by one professional judge and two lay judges (there were no juries in the Czechoslovak judicial system).
- Regional courts (one in each administrative kraj) are located in the capitals of each of Czechoslovakia's ten kraje and in Prague. They functioned as appellate courts and also had jurisdiction over trials in serious criminal cases where imprisonment exceeding five years may be imposed.

Regional and district professional judges were chosen by the Czech National Council and the Slovak National Council; lay judges were chosen by district national committees. The Supreme Court of the Czech Socialist Republic and the Supreme Court of the Slovak Socialist Republic serve as appellate courts for their respective regional courts and also heard petitions for breach of law against decisions by the lower courts. The supreme courts of the two republics decided in panels of three professional judges.

Another powerful arm of the judiciary was the Office of the Prosecutor. The general prosecutor, a federal officer, was appointed and removed by the president. In addition to the federal office, an Office of the Prosecutor existed for each republic. The republic office was administered by the republic Ministry of Justice. Prosecutors were responsible for supervising the observance of laws and legal regulations by public bodies and individual citizens. The Office of the Prosecutor was responsible for prosecuting both criminal and civil cases. Prosecutors might recommend modification or repeal of laws, and they had the right to summon citizens to appear before them.

== Lower levels ==
=== Republic levels ===
The administrative units of Czechoslovakia's two republics were, in each instance, a unicameral legislative body called the national council, an executive branch known as the government, and a judiciary consisting of a supreme court and an office of the prosecutor. Like its corresponding federal government unit, the Federal Assembly, the national council was described as the highest organ of state power in the republic, whereas the government was the "supreme executive authority." The 1968 constitutional amendments that created the two republican or, "national," governmental units initiated a truly federal system of government, which flourished briefly. Since that time, revisions of and deviations from the 1968 amendments have made the two national governments clearly subordinate to the federal governmental structure in Prague. This was apparent both in legislation, such as a 1971 law that authorized the federal government to interfere with and invalidate republican government initiatives, and in the interlocking responsibilities of certain officials within the two levels of government. For example, the premier of each republic was a deputy premier in the federal government, and the chairman of each national council was a member of the Presidium of the Federal Assembly.

Because of the numerical superiority of the Czech population, the Czech National Council had 200 representatives and the Slovak National Council only 150. Except for the difference in the number of deputies, the provisions of the federal Constitution applied equally to the national councils of each republic: deputies were elected to five-year terms of office; the national councils had to hold at least two sessions annually; and each national council elected its own presidium (fifteen to twenty-one members in the Slovak National Council and up to twenty-five members in the Czech National Council), which was empowered to act when the full national council was not in session.

In each of the two republics the executive branch consists of a premier, three deputy premiers, and a number of ministers. Both the Czech and the Slovak governments had ministers of agriculture and food, construction, culture, development and technology, education, finance, forestry and water resources, health, industry, interior, justice, labor and social affairs, and trade. The chairmen of the State Planning Commission and the People's Control Commission also held ministerial status in each republic; the government of the Czech Socialist Republic included, in addition, two ministers without portfolio.

=== Regional and local levels ===
Below the level of the republics (the national administrations), in the 1970s and 1980s, Communist Czechoslovakia was divided into regions kraje, districts okresy, and communities (i. e. towns, villages etc.).

The principal organs of government at these levels, known as national committees, functioned in accordance with the principle of the so-called democratic centralism. The 1968 Constitutional Law of Federation specified that the national governments directed and controlled the activities of all national committees within their respective territories. The system of national committees was established at the close of World War II by the then-existing provisional government and was used by the communists as a means of consolidating and extending their control. On the local level, the membership of the national committees consisted of from fifteen to twenty-five persons. National committees on the higher levels were proportionately larger: national committees at the district level had from 60 to 120 members, and national committees at the kraje level had between 80 and 150 members. National committee members were popularly elected for five-year terms of office. Each national committee elected a council from among its membership. The council, composed of a chairman, one or more deputy chairmen, a secretary, and an unspecified number of members, acted as the coordinating and controlling body of the national committee. To expedite the work of the national committee, the council established commissions and other subcommittees and could issue decrees and ordinances within its area of jurisdiction. The national committees on the local level were assigned particular areas of jurisdiction, including maintaining public order and organizing the implementation of the political, economic, and cultural tasks assigned by the KSC and the federal government. The Constitution charged the national committees with the responsibility of organizing and directing the economic, cultural, health, and social services in their areas. The committees had also to "ensure the protection of socialist ownership" and see that the "rules of socialist conduct are upheld."

== Elections ==
Elections in Czechoslovakia were held not to offer the electorate an opportunity to participate in a democratic choice of their government representatives but to confirm the representatives chosen by the KSC hierarchy. The 1960 constitution guaranteed multicandidate (but not multiparty) elections by requiring that the number of candidates to the National Assembly be greater than the number of posts. VoThe July 1971 electoral law lengthened the time between elections from four to five years (1971, 1976, 1981, 1986, and so forth) and designated that they take place in the fall, so that each election comes shortly after the party congress in the spring. The 1971 law replaced a 1967 electoral law that allowed the electorate to participate in the choice of candidates; the 1967 law was never applied because the 1968 elections were postponed by the August invasion. The November 1971 elections, then, were the first to be held since 1964. In these and subsequent elections, the National Front—nominally a coalition of all parties, but in truth controlled by the Communists—proposed single slates of candidates for the Federal Assembly, the two national councils, and the regional, district, and municipal national committees. The voter only had the option to cross out (disapprove) or not cross out (approve) the name of any or all official candidates nominated by the National Front. Polling booths are rarely used, and voting was often carried out collectively by the work force of each enterprise or by other groups of the population.

The 1971 elections were preceded by a concerted effort by a group of dissidents calling themselves the Socialist Movement of Czechoslovak Citizens to urge citizens to boycott the elections or cross off official names in protest of the undemocratic character of the 1971 election law. Official election results, nevertheless, showed that 99.5 percent of the 10.3 million eligible voters did cast ballots, and of these, some 99.8 percent voted for the official candidates. Following the election, rumors circulated that, in fact, up to 10 percent of the population had not voted and that between 10 and 25 percent of the voters had crossed out official names. Whatever the case, after the election some 200 persons associated with the Socialist Movement of Czechoslovak Citizens were arrested. Trials were held during July and August 1972, at which 47 persons were sentenced to a total of 118 years in prison.

In elections held in May 1986, Czechoslovak officials reported that 99.4 percent of registered voters participated in the Federal Assembly elections, and 99.9 percent of the total vote cast went to National Front candidates. Similar results were reported in the elections for the Czech National Council and the Slovak National Council and in the lower-level national committees.
