= National Assembly (Czechoslovakia, 1948–1969) =

Parliament of Communist Czechoslovakia

National Assembly of the Czechoslovak Socialist Republic Národní shromáždění ČSSR (Czech) Národné zhromaždenie ČSSR (Slovak)
- Legislative body in Czechoslovakia

Type
- Type: Unicameral

History
- Established: 1948
- Disbanded: 1969
- Preceded by: Constituent National Assembly
- Succeeded by: Federal Assembly
- Seats: 300 members (1948–1954); 368 members (1954–1960); 300 members (1960–1969)

Elections
- Voting system: Direct non-competitive elections (1948–1969)
- Last election: 14 June 1964

Meeting place
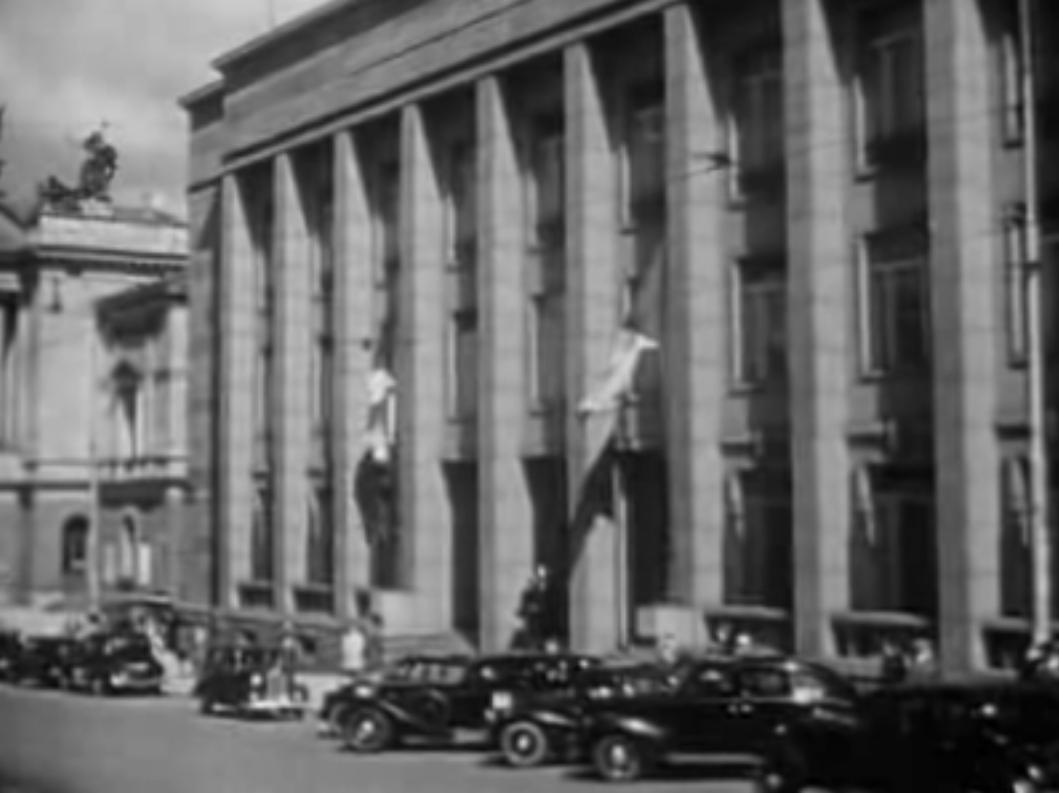
- National Assembly (originally stock exchange building), Prague

The National Assembly (Czech: Národní shromáždění, Slovak: Národné zhromaždenie) was the unicameral parliament of Communist Czechoslovakia from 1948 until the federalization of Czechoslovakia in 1969, replaced by the Federal Assembly. Under the Ninth-of-May Constitution, it was Czechoslovakia's highest legislative institution; the fully-communist Constitution of 1960 defined it as a supreme organ of state power within a one-branch system (unified power).

== Name Changes ==
Name	Native name	Year
National Assembly of the Czechoslovak Republic	(Czech: Národní shromáždění republiky Československé) (Slovak: Národné zhromaždenie republiky Československej)	1948–1960
National Assembly of the Czechoslovak Socialist Republic	(Czech: Národní shromáždění Československé socialistické republiky) (Slovak: Národné zhromaždenie Československej socialistickej republiky)	1960–1969

== Presidents of the National Assembly ==
Name	Entered office	Left office
Oldřich John	10 June 1948	15 October 1953
Zdeněk Fierlinger	15 October 1953	23 June 1964
Bohuslav Laštovička	23 June 1964	18 April 1968
Josef Smrkovský	18 April 1968	29 January 1969
