= Czech and Slovak Federative Republic =

Czechoslovak state from 1990 to 1992

Coordinates: 50°05′N 14°28′E

Czech and Slovak Federative Republic Česká a Slovenská Federativní Republika (Czech) Česká a Slovenská Federatívna Republika (Slovak)
- 1990–1992
- Flag Coat of arms
- Motto: "Pravda vítězí / Pravda víťazí" (Czech/Slovak) "Veritas vincit" (Latin) "Truth prevails" (1990–1992)
- Anthem: Kde domov můj (Czech); Where Is My Home; "Nad Tatrou sa blýska" (English: "Lightning Over the Tatras")
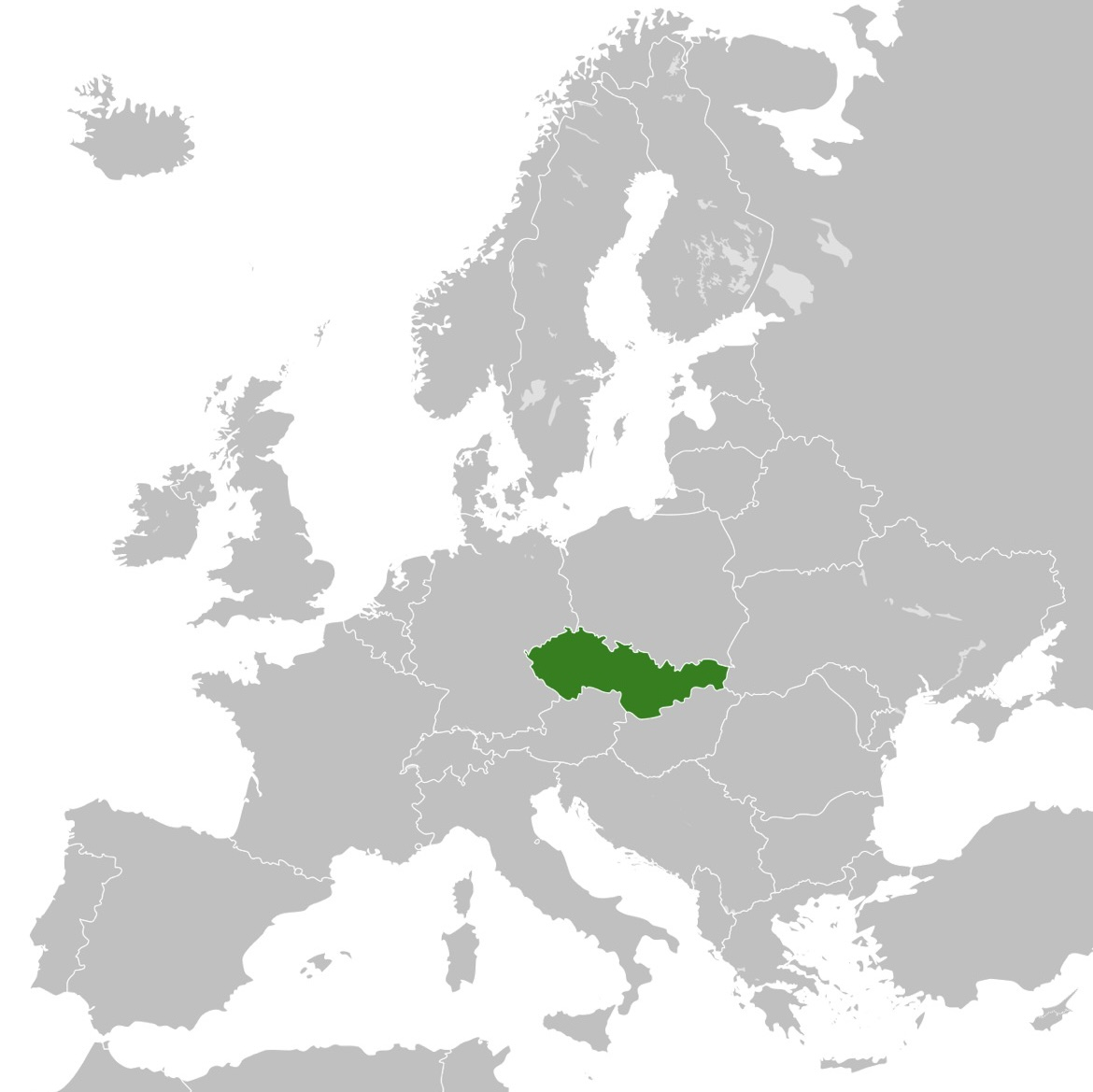
- Capital and largest city: Prague
- Official languages: Czech · Slovak
- Government: Federal parliamentary republic
- President
  - 1989–1992: Václav Havel
- Prime Minister
  - 1989–1992: Marián Čalfa
  - 1992: Jan Stráský
- Legislature: Federal Assembly
  - Upper house: Chamber of Nations
  - Lower house: Chamber of People
- Historical era: Velvet Revolution
  - Constitutional change: 23 April 1990
  - Dissolution: 31 December 1992
- Currency: Czechoslovak koruna
- Calling code: 42
- Internet TLD: .cs
Preceded by	Succeeded by
Czechoslovak Socialist Republic	Czech Republic; Slovakia
- Today part of: Czechia, Slovakia

After the Velvet Revolution in late 1989, Czechoslovakia was briefly renamed from the Czechoslovak Socialist Republic to the Czech and Slovak Federative Republic (Czech: Česká a Slovenská Federativní Republika, Slovak: Česká a Slovenská Federatívna Republika; ČSFR) that existed in Central Europe during the period from 23 April 1990 until 31 December 1992, after which the country was peacefully dissolved into the Czech Republic and the Slovak Republic.

== Adoption of the name ==
Since 1960, Czechoslovakia's official name had been the Czechoslovak Socialist Republic (Československá socialistická republika, ČSSR). In the aftermath of the Velvet Revolution, newly elected President Václav Havel announced that "Socialist" would be dropped from the country's official name. By then, the 1960 Constitution had been largely purged of its Communist character.

Conventional wisdom suggested that the country would resume the name used from 1919 to 1938 and from 1945 to 1960, Czechoslovak Republic (Československá republika). However, Slovak politicians objected that the traditional name subsumed Slovakia's equal status in the federal state too much. The first compromise was Constitutional Law 81/1990, which changed the country's name to Czechoslovak Federative Republic (Czech: Československá federativní republika, Slovak: Česko-slovenská federatívna republika; ČSFR), explicitly acknowledging the federal nature of the state. It was passed on 29 March 1990 (coming into force on the same day) only after an informal agreement on the Slovak form which would be explicitly codified by a future law on state symbols. This was met with general disapproval and another round of haggling, dubbed "the hyphen war" (pomlčková válka/vojna) after Slovaks' wish to insert a hyphen into the name (Česko-Slovensko). However, aggrieved Czechs vehemently opposed it as too reminiscent of such practice during the Second Czechoslovak Republic (when the official name was "Czecho-Slovak Republic"—which had also been used from 1918 to 1919)—when the country had been mutilated by the Munich Agreement and was slipping toward its final dismemberment at the hands of Nazi Germany a year later. The resultant compromise, after much behind-the-scenes negotiation, was Constitutional Law 101/1990, passed on 20 April and in force since its declaration on 23 April. The law changed the country's name to "Czech and Slovak Federative Republic"; unlike the previous one, it also explicitly listed both versions and stated they were equal.

The name breaks the rules of Czech and Slovak orthography, which do not generally use capitalization for descriptive words such as "federative" and "republic", nor for adjectives derived from proper nouns. Both rules were broken at once as a compromise.

While few people were happy with the name, it came into use quickly. Czech and Slovak tensions, of which this was an early sign, soon became manifest in matters of greater immediate importance which made the country's name a comparatively minor issue and at the same time even more impossible to change, so the name remained.

The 1960 Constitution remained in force up to 1 January 1993. It was also heavily amended to remove its Communist character. Work on a permanent constitution was still underway at the time of the dissolution of Czechoslovakia.

== Government and politics ==
=== Administrative divisions ===
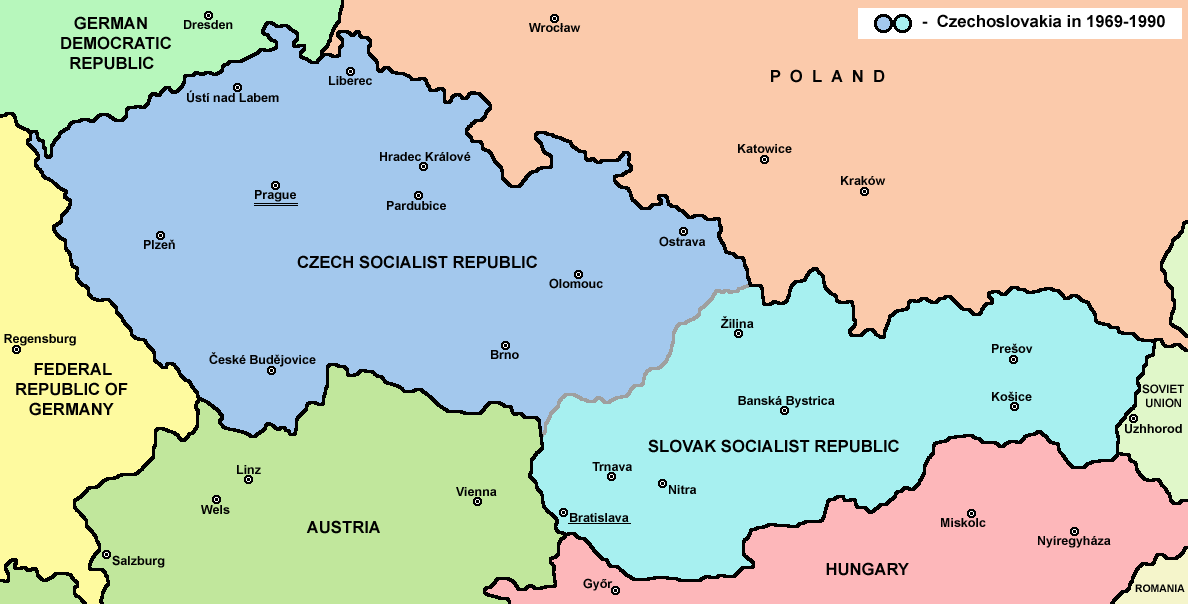
Czechoslovakia in 1969

- 1960–1992: 10 regions (kraje), Prague, and (since 1970) Bratislava; divided in 109–114 districts (Okresy); the kraje were abolished temporarily in Slovakia in 1969–1970 and for many functions since 1991 in Czechoslovakia; in addition, the two internal republics, the Czech Socialist Republic, and Slovak Socialist Republic, were established in 1969.

== See also ==
- History of Czechoslovakia (1989–1992)
