= Can't Buy Me Love (film) =

1987 film by Steve Rash

- Theatrical release poster
- Directed by: Steve Rash
- Written by: Michael Swerdlick
- Produced by: Thom Mount
- Starring: Patrick Dempsey; Amanda Peterson; Dennis Dugan
- Cinematography: Peter Lyons Collister
- Edited by: Jeff Gourson
- Music by: Robert Folk
- Production companies: Touchstone Pictures; Silver Screen Partners III; Apollo Pictures; The Mount Company
- Distributed by: Buena Vista Pictures Distribution
- Release date: August 14, 1987 (United States)
- Running time: 94 minutes
- Country: United States
- Language: English
- Box office: $31.6 million

Can't Buy Me Love is a 1987 American teen romantic comedy film directed by Steve Rash, and written by Michael Swerdlick. The film follows an unpopular high school student (Patrick Dempsey) who pays $1,000 to a cheerleader (Amanda Peterson) who pretends to be his girlfriend for a month.

The film takes its title from a Beatles song of the same title. Critical reviews were mixed, and the film was a financial success.

== Plot ==
Ronald Miller is a typical high school nerd living in suburban Tucson, Arizona. He has spent all summer mowing lawns to save up for a telescope. At an opportune moment, he makes a deal with next-door neighbor and popular cheerleader Cindy Mancini. She had borrowed her mother's expensive suede outfit without permission to wear to a Labor Day party, only to have wine accidentally spilled on it. Cindy reluctantly agrees to help Ronald boost his social status by posing as his girlfriend for a month, after he pays her $1,000 to replace the damaged clothing. although she already has a boyfriend, Bobby Hilton, who is attending the University of Iowa.

Ronald then trades his nerdy, yet loyal, friends for the popular but shallow students, and undergoes a complete clothing and hair makeover under Cindy's direction. Over time, a genuine friendship develops between them. Cindy asks Ronald to read poetry she has been reluctant to reveal. In turn, Ronald shares his interests in astronomy and space travel. On their last date that Ronald paid for, Cindy begins to have real feelings for him and hints she would like to kiss him, but he misunderstands. The next day at school, they stage a breakup in front of a crowd, but Ronald takes things too far and says some hurtful things about Cindy in front of her friends. The next day, Cindy notices him behaving arrogantly at school, and becomes jealous when she sees him flirting with her best friends Barbara and Patty.

Ronald takes Patty to a school dance, where he performs a dance he learned from an African cultural show on public television. He mistakenly thought the dance was the latest dance craze performed on American Bandstand. At first, the other kids are mystified, but they soon join in, and Ronald's new dancing further increases his popularity. On Halloween night, he and some jocks drive to the house of Kenneth Wurman, Ronald's best friend. They test Ronald's loyalty by coercing him to hurl dog feces at Kenneth's house. Kenneth is lying in wait and catches Ronald, but lets him go before his father can call the police. Ronald attempts to apologize the next day at school, but Kenneth ignores him.

At a New Year's Eve party at Big John's house, Ronald starts drinking and has a romantic tryst with his date, Iris, in the bathroom. Cindy walks by and hears Ronald reciting her special poem to Iris as if he had written it. Cindy's boyfriend, Bobby, unexpectedly shows up at the party. He learns about her relationship with Ronald, and publicly breaks up with her. In a drunken rage, Cindy reveals how Ronald paid for her companionship. He is immediately ostracised. When school resumes, he finds himself a social outcast, by both the jocks and the nerds. His attempts to reconcile with both Cindy and Kenneth are rebuffed.

Ronald gets an opportunity to redeem himself at lunch when he sees Quint, a jock, bullying Kenneth after noticing Kenneth helping Patty with her math homework. Ronald breaks up the fight and points out to everyone how pointless school tribalism is, drawing applause from his peers, which leads to Ronald redeeming himself with everyone.

A few days later, Ronald appears at Cindy's house in the morning on his riding lawnmower, waking her up and then apologizing. He pours out his heart to her, saying he was originally motivated by a desire to be close to her. Ronald then asks Cindy to prom, and they kiss for the first time. The new couple then ride off into the sunset on the lawnmower.

== Cast ==
- Patrick Dempsey as Ronald Miller
- Amanda Peterson as Cindy Mancini
- Courtney Gains as Kenneth Wurman
- Tina Caspary as Barbara
- Seth Green as Chuck Miller
- Sharon Farrell as Mrs. Mancini
- Dennis Dugan as David Miller
- Darcy DeMoss as Patty
- Devin DeVasquez as Iris
- Eric Bruskotter as Big John Richman
- Gerardo Mejía as Ricky
- Cort McCown as Quint
- Cloyce Morrow as Judy Miller
- Steve Franken as Moda Clerk
- Ami Dolenz as Fran
- Max Perlich as Lester
- Tudor Sherrard as Brent
- George Gray III as Bobby Hilton
- James Gooden as Mr. Wurman
- Lisa Givens as Bambi La Brock
- Paula Abdul as Dancer (uncredited)
- Christopher Maleki as Frat Guy (uncredited)

== Production notes ==
The film was shot on location in Tucson, Arizona, at Tucson High Magnet School (then known as Tucson High School). The choreography is by Paula Abdul, who makes an uncredited appearance as a dancer. On a date where the main characters Ronald Miller (Patrick Dempsey) and Cindy Mancini (Amanda Peterson) begin to bond, they jump the perimeter wall and explore the 309th Aerospace Maintenance and Regeneration Group Aircraft Bone Yard on Davis–Monthan Air Force Base that contains 4,400 aircraft.

The film was originally titled Boy Rents Girl but was changed when rights to The Beatles song of the same name were obtained. The cast included long-time character actor Steve Franken in a minor role, and Seth Green in one of his earlier roles.

== Critical reception ==
Can't Buy Me Love received mixed reviews from critics. Caryn James, in The New York Times, thought the film missed its mark and traded its potential originality for a bid at popularity: "[The film] ... has an identity crisis that's a mirror-image of Ronald's own. He thinks he wants popularity at any price, though he's really a sincere guy. The film thinks it wants to be sincere, when all it truly wants is to be popular, just like the other kids' movies, so it sells off its originality.

Roger Ebert of The Chicago Sun-Times gave the film a half star out of a possible four. He believed it was inferior to films like Gregory's Girl (1981) or Lucas (1986) which showed more realism and sensitivity about young people, while Can't Buy Me Love "makes American teenagers look like stupid and materialistic twits. That would be all right if the movie were aware of itself and knew what it was doing – if it were a satirical comment on our society. But this movie is as naive as the day is long."

Rotten Tomatoes has a rating of 48% based on 25 critics with the consensus: "While Can't Buy Me Love gets some value out of its plucky leads, this romantic comedy struggles to find grace in a cynical conceit that belongs in the bargain bin." In 2006, it ranked number 41 on Entertainment Weekly's list of the 50 Best High School Movies.

== Awards ==
Young Artist Award

- Won: Best Young Actor in a Motion Picture—Comedy, Patrick Dempsey
- Nominated: Best Young Actress in a Motion Picture—Comedy, Amanda Peterson
- Nominated: Best Young Actress in a Motion Picture—Comedy, Tina Caspary
- Nominated: Best Family Motion Picture—Comedy

== Home media ==
Touchstone Home Entertainment released the film on VHS and DVD on August 14, 2002. As of June 2022, it is available for streaming via Disney+ in Canada, and previously on Netflix, Cinemax, Tubi, Hulu and The Roku Channel in the US.

== Soundtrack ==
In 2013, Intrada Records released Robert Folk's complete score for the film on a limited edition CD paired with David Newman's work for Paradise.

== Remake ==
In 2003, Can't Buy Me Love was remade as Love Don't Cost a Thing starring Nick Cannon and Christina Milian. Though the triggering event differs between the two films, many of the aspects/scenes from the original film are reinterpreted in this remake, such as the eating of raw egg in the Home Economics classroom, as well as the cheerleader telling the bully that he is sitting in the wrong section in the cafeteria and that he needs to sit in the "asshole section" of the cafeteria.
