= Constitution of Czechoslovakia =

The constitutions of Czechoslovakia were in use from 1918 to the dissolution of the state in 1992. The first constitution was adapted and put in place following the separation of Bohemia from the Austria-Hungary empire.

The former country of Czechoslovakia had several constitutions, as described in the following articles:

- 1918 Constitution of Czechoslovakia (provisional)
- Czechoslovak Constitution of 1920
- Ninth-of-May Constitution, 1948
- 1960 Constitution of Czechoslovakia
- Constitutional Law of Federation, 1968

== See also ==
- Constitution of the Czech Republic
- Constitution of the Slovak Republic
