= Reconciliation =

Reconciliation or reconcile may refer to:

== Arts, entertainment, and media ==
- Reconciliation (Under the North Star), the third volume of the Under the North Star trilogy by Väinö Linna
- Reconciliation (Josefina de Vasconcellos sculpture), a sculpture by Josefina de Vasconcellos in Coventry Cathedral
- Reconciliation, a sculpture by Willem Vermandere in Nieuwpoort, Belgium
- "Reconciliation" (Dynasty 1981), episode of soap opera
- "Reconciliation" (Dynasty 1985), episode of soap opera

== Law ==
- Reconciliation (family law)
- Reconciliation (United States Congress), a legislative procedure in the United States Senate

== Religion ==
- Reconciliation (theology), returning to faith or harmony after a conflict
- Reconciliation theology, political theology of how reconciliation can be brought into regions of conflict
- Sacrament of Penance, a sacrament of the Catholic Church also known as Reconciliation

== Sociology and politics ==
- Reconciliation in Australia, in 20th- and 21st-century politics
  - National Reconciliation Week
- Reconciliation (reconciliation studies)
- Reconciliation studies

== Other uses ==
- Reconciliation (accounting)
- Reconciliation ecology, a branch of ecology that studies biodiversity in human-dominated ecosystems
- Reconcile (rapper) (born 1989), American rapper

== See also ==
- Conciliation
- "Reconciled", song by Penal Colony on the album Put Your Hands Down
- Reconcilee, an émigré from Communist Czechoslovakia who later reconciled their relationship with the régime
- Transitional Justice
- Truth and reconciliation commission
- Vergangenheitsbewältigung, processes of dealing with the past in Germany
- National Day for Truth and Reconciliation, Canadian holiday
- Day of Reconciliation, South African holiday
