= Reconcilee =

Term for communism reconciliation

Reconcilee is a loose English translation for the Czech neologism word "upravenec" (pl. "upravenci") which denotes the émigrés from Communist Czechoslovakia who subsequently "reconciled" their relationship with the Communist régime.

== The origins ==
From 1948 until the end of the régime, unauthorized migration from Czechoslovakia was considered a crime. Between 1945 and 1987 172,659 people went into exile. After the Helsinki Accords, the Communist establishment wished to show some kind of mitigation of the thus far harsh attitude towards émigrés. Directive No. 4/1977 Official Journal of the Czech Socialist Republic, On Reconciliation Legal Relationships of Czechoslovak Socialist Republic to Citizens Who Stay Abroad Without a Permit of Czechoslovak Authorities, was adopted. Hence the term "upravenec".

== Categories ==
In 1980 there were 115,000 émigrés. Directives stipulated two categories of reconcilees:

1. those who wished to stay permanently abroad as citizens of Czechoslovakia (art. 3–5; 3,145 persons applied), or
2. those who wished cessation of citizenship of Czechoslovakia (art. 6–8; 4,533 applied).

A prerequisite to receive a status of upravenec was an application for a pardon of conviction for illegal emigration (12,486 applied) or being amnestied. Applicants had to pay large sums (officially the cost of education) and after reconciliation were allowed to visit Communist Czechoslovakia with no obstacles.

Those who wished to return to Czechoslovakia (art. 2 — first category; 452 persons applied) were called "navrátilci" (returnees). Directives also identified a further category of émigrés — enemies of the Communist régime (art. 9–12). These were deprived of Czechoslovak citizenship and prohibited from visiting Czechoslovakia. (They thus could not be ranked among returnees or reconcilees.)

== Controversy ==
The unsuspendable condition for reconciliation was "good or neutral relationship" towards the Communist régime. Upravenci were therefore disliked by much of the rest of the exile community and called collaborators. Most reconcilees hid their reconciliation, and speculative accusation of being a upravenec was considered a slur. The famous Czech author Josef Škvorecký wrote satiric short stories about them. Hard-line émigrés speculated that upravenci were confidants of the Communist secret police.
