= Czech Socialist Republic =

Part of Czechoslovakia between 1969 and 1990

Coordinates: 50.0833°N 14.4667°E

Czech Socialist Republic (1969–1990) Česká socialistická republika (Czech) Czech Republic (1990–1992) Česká republika (Czech)
- Federal subject of the Czechoslovak Socialist Republic (1969–90) and Czech and Slovak Federative Republic (1990–92)
- 1969–1992
- Flag (1990–1992) Greater coat of arms (1990–1992)

- Czech Socialist Republic within the ČSSR
- Capital: Prague
- Government
  - Type: Socialist republic (1968–89); Parliamentary republic (1989–92)
- Prime Minister
  - 1969: Stanislav Rázl (first)
  - 1992: Václav Klaus (last)
- Legislature: Czech National Council
- History
  - Constitutional Law of Federation: 1 January 1969
  - Velvet Revolution: 17 November – 29 December 1989
  - Independence: 31 December 1992
Preceded by	Succeeded by
Czechoslovak Socialist Republic	Czech Republic
- Today part of: Czech Republic

The Czech Socialist Republic (Czech: Česká socialistická republika, ČSR) was a republic within the Czechoslovak Socialist Republic. The name was used from 1 January 1969 to November 1989, when the previously unitary Czechoslovak state changed into a federation. From 1990 to 1992, the Czech Republic (Czech: Česká republika, ČR) existed as a federal subject within the Czech and Slovak Federative Republic, and later became the independent Czech Republic.

== History ==
=== Czechoslovak Socialist Republic (1969–1989) ===
After the Warsaw Pact invasion of Czechoslovakia in 1968, liberalisation reforms were stopped and reverted. The only exception was the federalization of the country. The former centralist state Czechoslovakia was divided in two parts: the Czech Socialist Republic and the Slovak Socialist Republic by the Constitutional Law of Federation of 28 October 1968, which went into effect on 1 January 1969. New national parliaments (the Czech National Council and the Slovak National Council) were created and the traditional parliament of Czechoslovakia was renamed the "Federal Assembly" and was divided in two chambers: the House of the People (Czech: Sněmovna lidu, Slovak: Snemovňa ľudu) and the House of Nations (Czech: Sněmovna národů, Slovak: Snemovňa národov). Very complicated rules of voting were put in effect.

=== Czech and Slovak Federative Republic (1990–1992) ===
After the Velvet Revolution which brought the end of socialism in Czechoslovakia, the word socialist was dropped from the names of the two republics. Thus, on 6 March 1990 the Czech Socialist Republic was renamed the Czech Republic (though it was still part of Czech and Slovak Federative Republic).

The complicated system of parliamentary voting (there were de facto five different bodies each having right of veto) was kept after the fall of socialism, complicating and delaying political decisions during radical changes in the economy.

Later, in 1992, the Czech Republic became an independent state (see Dissolution of Czechoslovakia).

== See also ==
- Constitutional Law of Federation
- History of Czechoslovakia
- Slovak Socialist Republic (1969–1990)/Slovak Republic (1990–1992)
- Czech and Slovak Federative Republic
- Reconcilee
