= Slovak Socialist Republic =

Part of Czechoslovakia between 1969 and 1990

Coordinates: 48°08′N 17°06′E

Slovak Socialist Republic (1969–1990) Slovenská socialistická republika (Slovak) Slovak Republic (1990–1992) Slovenská republika (Slovak)
- Federal subject of the Czechoslovak Socialist Republic (1969–90) and Czech and Slovak Federative Republic (1990–92)
- 1969–1992
- Flag (1969–1992) Top: Coat of arms (1969-90); Bottom: Coat of arms (1990–92)

- Slovak Socialist Republic within the ČSSR

Anthem
- "Nad Tatrou sa blýska" ("Lightning over the Tatras")
- Capital: Bratislava
- Government
  - Type: Socialist republic (1968–89); Parliamentary republic (1989–92)
- Prime Minister
  - 1969: Štefan Sádovský (first)
  - 1992: Vladimír Mečiar (last)
- Legislature: Slovak National Council
- History
  - Constitutional Law of Federation: 1 January 1969
  - Velvet Revolution: 17 November – 29 December 1989
  - Independence: 31 December 1992
Preceded by	Succeeded by
Czechoslovak Socialist Republic	Slovakia
- Today part of: Slovakia

The Slovak Socialist Republic (Slovak: Slovenská socialistická republika, SSR) was a republic within the Czechoslovak Socialist Republic from 1969 to 1990, when the previously unitary Czechoslovak state changed into a federation. The name was used from 1 January 1969 until November 1989. The Slovak Republic (Slovak: Slovenská republika, SR) was, from 1990 to 1992, a republic within the Czech and Slovak Federative Republic, that is now the independent Slovakia.

== History ==
After the occupation of Czechoslovakia in 1968 liberalisation reforms were halted and then reversed. The only significant exception was the federalization of the country. The former centralist state of Czechoslovakia was divided into two, the Czech Socialist Republic and Slovak Socialist Republic, by the Constitutional Law of Federation of 28 October 1968, which came into effect on 1 January 1969. A new national parliament for the Czech Socialist Republic (the Czech National Council ) was created and the old parliament of Czechoslovakia was renamed the "Federal Assembly" and was divided in two chambers: the House of the People (Czech: Sněmovna lidu, Slovak: Snemovňa ľudu) and the House of Nations (Czech: Sněmovna národů, Slovak: Snemovňa národov). Very complicated rules of voting were put into effect.

Federalization was notional – all the real power was kept by the Communist Party. The increased number of "parliaments" conveniently provided more positions for party members, though their role was merely symbolic.

After the fall of socialism in Czechoslovakia, the word "socialist" was dropped from the names of the two republics, i.e. the Slovak Socialist Republic was renamed Slovak Republic (at that time still part of Czechoslovakia; from April 1990 of the Czech and Slovak Federative Republic).

The complicated system of parliamentary voting (there were de facto five different bodies each having a right of veto) was kept after the fall of socialism, complicating and delaying political decisions during radical changes in the economy.

In November 1992, the federal parliament voted to dissolve the country on 31 December 1992. As from 1 January 1993, the Slovak Republic became an independent state named Slovakia.

== Legacy ==
A 2009 Pew survey showed that 48% of Slovaks said life was economically worse nowadays compared to the Warsaw Pact era. A 2018 poll in Slovakia found that 81% agreed that people helped each other more during communism, were more sympathetic and closer to each other. 79% asserted that people lived in a safer environment during socialism and that violent crimes were less frequent. Another 77% claimed that thanks to the planned economy, there was enough useful work for all and therefore no unemployment. However, the poll also noted that "Most of the respondents did not want to return to the communist-time economy and preferred a market or social market economy, but in the answers to specific questions they favoured a greater role of the state, with guarantees and social certainties".

== See also ==
- Constitutional Law of Federation
- History of Czechoslovakia
- Czech Socialist Republic (1969–1989)/Czech Republic (1990–1992)
- Czech and Slovak Federative Republic
- Slovak Republic (1939–1945)
