= Constitutional Act on the Czechoslovak Federation =

Czechoslovak constitutional law in 1968 which converted the state into a federation

Federal republics in Czechoslovakia

The Constitutional Act on the Czechoslovak Federation (Czech: Ústavní zákon o československé federaci, Slovak: Ústavný zákon o česko-slovenskej federácii) was a constitutional law in Czechoslovakia adopted on 27 October 1968 and in force from 1 January 1969 to 1 January 1993 that affected the 1960 Constitution. It converted the previously unitary Czechoslovak state into a federation.

== Federation ==
For nearly all of its existence as an independent nation, Czechoslovakia had been a unitary state, the lone exception being the "Czecho-Slovakia era" immediately before World War II. The concentration of governmental authority in Prague was a source of discontent within Slovakia throughout the 1960s. As part of the Prague Spring reforms, Communist Party leader Alexander Dubček, himself a Slovak, sought to grant more autonomy to the Slovaks. Indeed, the resulting reform was virtually the only product of the Prague Spring to survive the Soviet invasion.

The promulgation of the Constitutional Law of the Federation amended fifty-eight articles of the 1960 Constitution of Czechoslovakia concerning government structure. The Czechoslovak state was declared to be a federation of "two equal fraternal nations," the Czech Socialist Republic and the Slovak Socialist Republic, each with a national administration paralleling and, at least in theory, equal in status to the federal government. Dual citizenship was established (Article 5 (3): "Every Czechoslovak citizen is at the same time a citizen of the Czech Socialist Republic or the Slovak Socialist Republic"). Many of the former functions of the central government were instead placed under the jurisdiction of the two national governments. The federal government retained exclusive jurisdiction over foreign affairs, national defense, federal reserves, and national resources. It held joint jurisdiction in several other matters, but the extent of the federalization reform was sweeping.

=== Federal legislature ===
The most significant and lasting change under the 1968 constitutional law was the replacement of the unicameral National Assembly with a bicameral legislature known as the Federal Assembly. The two bodies, given equal authority, were the Chamber of the People, which was identical to the old National Assembly, and the Chamber of the Nations, which contained an equal number of Czechs and Slovaks. Together with a provision (Article 42) that certain decisions required the majority consent of each half (Czech and Slovak) of the Chamber of the Nations and a provision (Article 41) that constitutional amendments, organic laws, the election of the president and declarations of war required a three-fifths supermajority not only in the Chamber of the People but also of each half (Czech and Slovak) of the Chamber of the Nations, this institutional reform was designed to end Slovak fear of Czech domination of the legislative branch of the government.

== Subsequent developments ==
It soon became apparent, however, that many aspects of the 1968 federalization were politically and administratively impractical. Political power remained firmly centralized in the Communist Party (proposals to federalize the party were dropped after the 1968 Soviet invasion of Czechoslovakia), and the administration of two economic systems, two police systems, and the like proved unworkable. As a result, July 1971 amendments to the 1968 Constitutional Law of Federation unified the administration of these and other government functions, ended the practice of dual citizenship, and, most importantly, authorized the federal government to interfere with and invalidate measures of the national governments (similarly to president's rule in India and federal intervention in Argentina). Although most of the structures of the 1968 reform remained intact, observers of the Czechoslovak system of government in the 1970s agreed that federalism remained little more than a facade after the enactment of the 1971 constitutional amendments. In May 1975, the 1968 Constitutional Law of the Federation was further amended to allow Gustáv Husák to take over the presidency from the ailing Ludvík Svoboda.

== Velvet divorce ==
The constitutional law was superseded by the new Constitution of the Czech Republic and the Constitution of the Slovak Republic that came into force on January 1, 1993, after the effectively negotiated dissolution of Czechoslovakia. The Constitutional Act on the Czechoslovak Federation hadn't foreseen any dissolution and didn't discuss any rights of the nations for self-determination. The Slovak National Council's Declaration of Independence of the Slovak Nation approved in July 1992 was therefore unconstitutional – at least the planned outcomes were indisputably unconstitutional. That declaration and its conflict with the constitutional system of Czechoslovakia persuaded most Czech and Slovak politicians that negotiations about the dissolution had become unavoidable.
