= 1960 Constitution of Czechoslovakia =

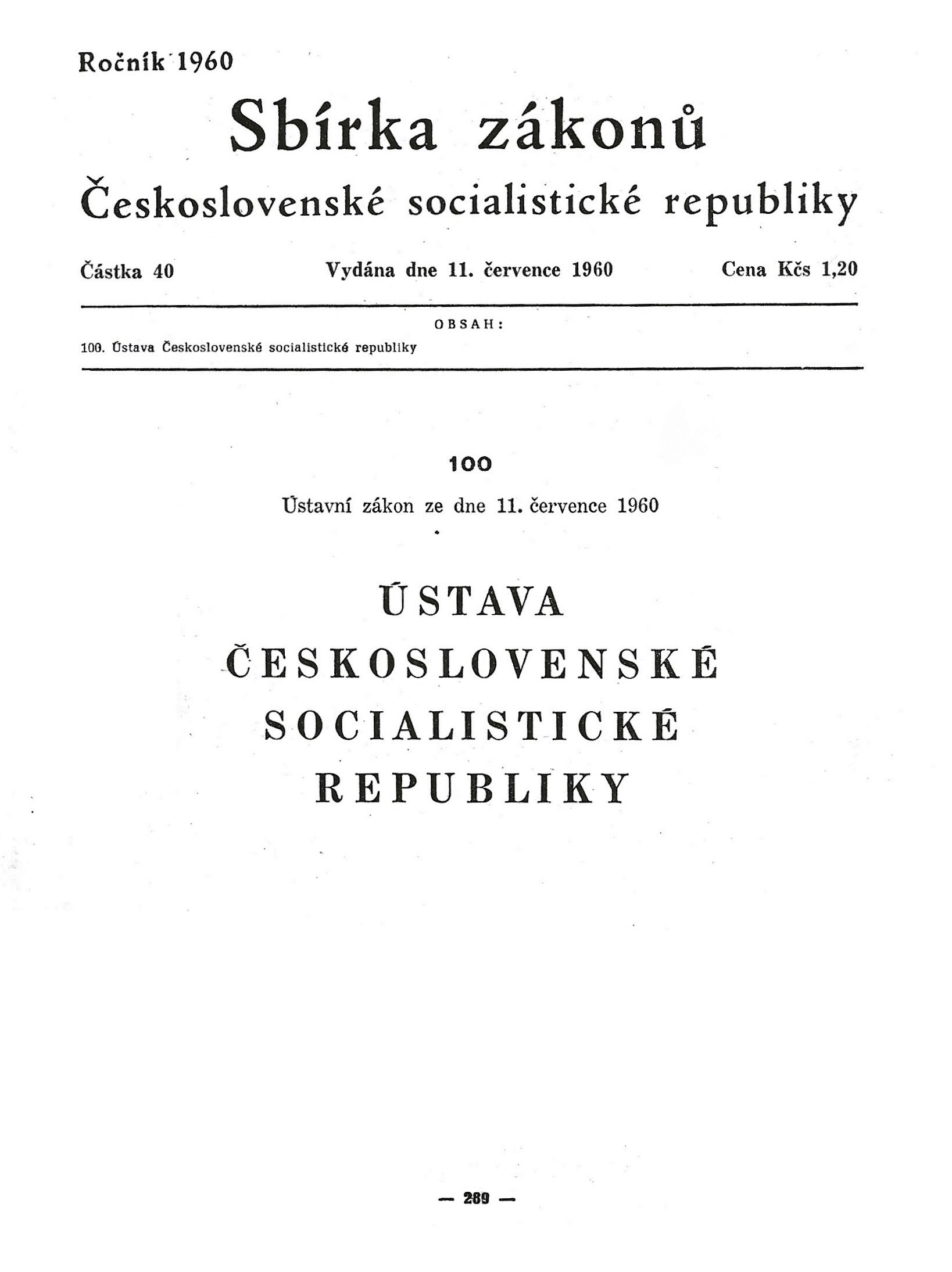
- Title of the Constitution
- Ratified: 11 July 1960
- Date effective: 11 July 1960
- Repealed: 1 January 1993
- Author: National Assembly
- Signatories: Antonín Novotný; Zdeněk Fierlinger; Viliam Široký
- Purpose: To announce achievement of socialism under leadership of the Communist Party

Full text
- Constitution of the Czechoslovak Socialist Republic at Wikisource

The Constitution of the Czechoslovak Socialist Republic (Ústava Československé socialistické / Československej socialistickej republiky in Czech / Slovak), promulgated on 11 July 1960 as the constitutional law 100/1960 Sb., was a communist state constitution and Czechoslovakia's third permanent constitution overall. It was the second constitution adopted under Communist rule. It replaced the 1948 Ninth-of-May Constitution and was widely changed by the Constitutional Law of Federation in 1968. In 1989 and 1990, in the wake of the Velvet Revolution, it was extensively revised to prune out its Marxist-Leninist and state socialist character. The revision was intended to allow the document to be used until it could be replaced with a completely new constitution. However, this never took place, and it remained in force until the dissolution of Czechoslovakia in 1992.

== Overview ==
The Ninth-of-May-Constitution was superficially similar in many respects to the 1920 Constitution and contained a mixture of liberal democratic and state socialist elements. In contrast, the 1960 Constitution was a fully Marxist-Leninist document. It borrowed heavily from the 1936 Soviet Constitution (known as "the Stalin Constitution"). This was reflected in the change of the country's official name from the Czechoslovak Republic (which was reconstituted as a "people's democratic state" after the 1948 Communist takeover) to Czechoslovak Socialist Republic. Due to President and party boss Antonín Novotný's devotion to Nikita Khrushchev and oneupmanship among other Eastern Bloc countries, Czechoslovakia was declared the first country after "our great ally, the fraternal Union of Soviet Socialist Republics" to have achieved socialism (three years before the Socialist Federal Republic of Yugoslavia and five before the Socialist Republic of Romania). Thus the constitution's preamble said that "socialism has won in our country," proclaiming that the last obstacle to socialism had been removed by "the determined action of the working people in February 1948." It went on to say that as a result of "finishing the socialist construction, we are changing over to building an advanced socialist society and gathering strength for the transition to communism."

The 1960 Constitution severely limited the autonomy granted to Slovakia. This provision was Novotný's idea. The executive branch of the Slovak government was abolished and its duties assigned to the Presidium of the Slovak National Council, thus combining executive and legislative functions into a single body. The legislative National Assembly was given authority to overrule decisions of the Slovak National Council, and central government agencies took over the administration of the major organs of Slovak local government.

The constitution was first amended by constitutional laws 110/1967 (status of Prague local councils to be set by special law), 28/1968 (similar for Bratislava), the Constitutional Law of Federation 143/1968 and accompanying 144/1968 on ethnic minorities, and further by constitutional laws 57/1969 (local councils put into the authority of national republics), 155/1969 (court reform), 43/1971 (elected bodies term of office prolonged to 5 years from 4), 50/1975 (this actually affected only the Constitutional Law of Federation, into which the Presidency had been moved: President unable to carry out his duties over a year can be replaced, i. e. ill Ludvík Svoboda with Gustáv Husák), 62/1978 (a minor change about schooling, see below), 135/1989 (leading role of the KSČ abolished etc.) and several times during 1990–1992 (e. g. 102/1990 change of the national symbols – the constitutional laws changing the country's name twice weren't formally amendments to the constitution; 23/1991 incorporation of the human rights charter that replaced the Chapter 2 below, etc.).

== Structure ==
The Constitution consisted of a preamble and 112 articles divided into 9 chapters. Chapter 1, entitled "The Social Order," declares Czechoslovakia to be a "socialist state, founded on the firm bond of workers, peasants and intelligentsia, in whose lead is the working class." It declared Czechoslovakia to be a member of "the world socialist system" dedicated to "friendly relations to all nations and securing lasting peace in the whole world". The paragraph whereby it was "a unitary State of two fraternal nations possessing equal rights – the Czechs and the Slovaks" was changed into "federal state" and moved into the Law of Federation in 1968.

While Article 1 of the Ninth-of-May Constitution vested all power in "the people," Article 2 of the 1960 Constitution vested power in "the working people." State power was exercised "by the working people through representative bodies which are elected by, surveilled by, and accountable to them." Article 4 codified the actual state of affairs that had prevailed in the country since 1948 by declaring, "The leading force in the society and the state is the vanguard of the working class, the Communist Party of Czechoslovakia (KSČ)." The party had not even been mentioned in the Ninth-of-May Constitution.

Principles of the "socialist economic system, in which the means of production are socialised and the entire national economy directed by plan" and the rules of democratic centralism, are also laid out. "Socialist ownership" takes two forms: state ownership especially of natural resources, the means of industrial production, public transportation and communications, banks and insurance companies, mass media and health, educational, and scientific facilities; and cooperative ownership, which is the property of people's cooperatives (Art. 8). Small private enterprises "based on [owner's] personal labour and excluding exploitation of others' workforce" are permitted within limits (9) formally; this in practice concerned agriculture. Personal ownership of consumer goods, "family homes, and savings earned through labour" is guaranteed, as is inheritance of such property (10).

Chapter 2 describes the rights and duties of citizens. Equal rights regardless of nationality, race, or sex are guaranteed (20). Education is free and compulsory to the age of fifteen (24; this was changed to "set by law" as impractical in the education reform of the 1970s); citizens of Hungarian, Ukrainian, and Polish ethnicity are ensured "all opportunities and means for education in their mother tongue" (25; this was abolished and replaced by somewhat more detailed constitutional law on minorities 144/1968, which also took in account Germans and listed Rusyns as synonym to Ukrainians). "All citizens have the right of work and compensation for work done according to its amount, quality and social import" (21), "all workers" have the right of medical care and material security in old age and in case of disability (23). "In accordance with the interests of the working people, all citizens are guaranteed" freedom of speech and press (28). Also guaranteed is the "right to profess any religious faith or to be without religious conviction, and to practice religious acts unless this contravenes the law"; conscientious objection to "civic duty set by law" based on religious conviction is specifically prohibited (32) while citizens are bound to serve in the armed forces (37). Chapters 3 to 6 deal with the National Assembly (defined as the "supreme organ of state power"), President, government and Slovak National Council respectively and were abolished and replaced by the Constitutional Law of Federation in 1968. Chapter 7 concerns National Committees (i. e. local and regional government), 8 judiciary system and 9 general and concluding provisions.

== See also ==
- Government structure of Communist Czechoslovakia
