= Federal Assembly (Czechoslovakia) =

Legislature of Czechoslovakia from 1969 to its dissolution in 1992

Federal Assembly of the Czech and Slovak Federative Republic Federální shromáždění ČSFR (Czech) Federálne zhromaždenie ČSFR (Slovak)
- Legislative body in Czechoslovakia

Type
- Type: Bicameral
- Houses: Chamber of Nations; Chamber of People

History
- Established: 1 January 1969
- Disbanded: 31 December 1992
- Preceded by: National Assembly
- Succeeded by: Parliament of the Czech Republic; (Slovakia) National Council of the Slovak Republic
- Seats: 350 members (1969–1990): 150 Chamber of Nations; 200 Chamber of People; 300 members (1990–1992): 150 Chamber of Nations; 150 Chamber of People

Elections
- Voting system: Direct non-competitive elections (1969–1990); Direct competitive proportional representation (1990–1992)
- Last election: 5–6 June 1992

Meeting place
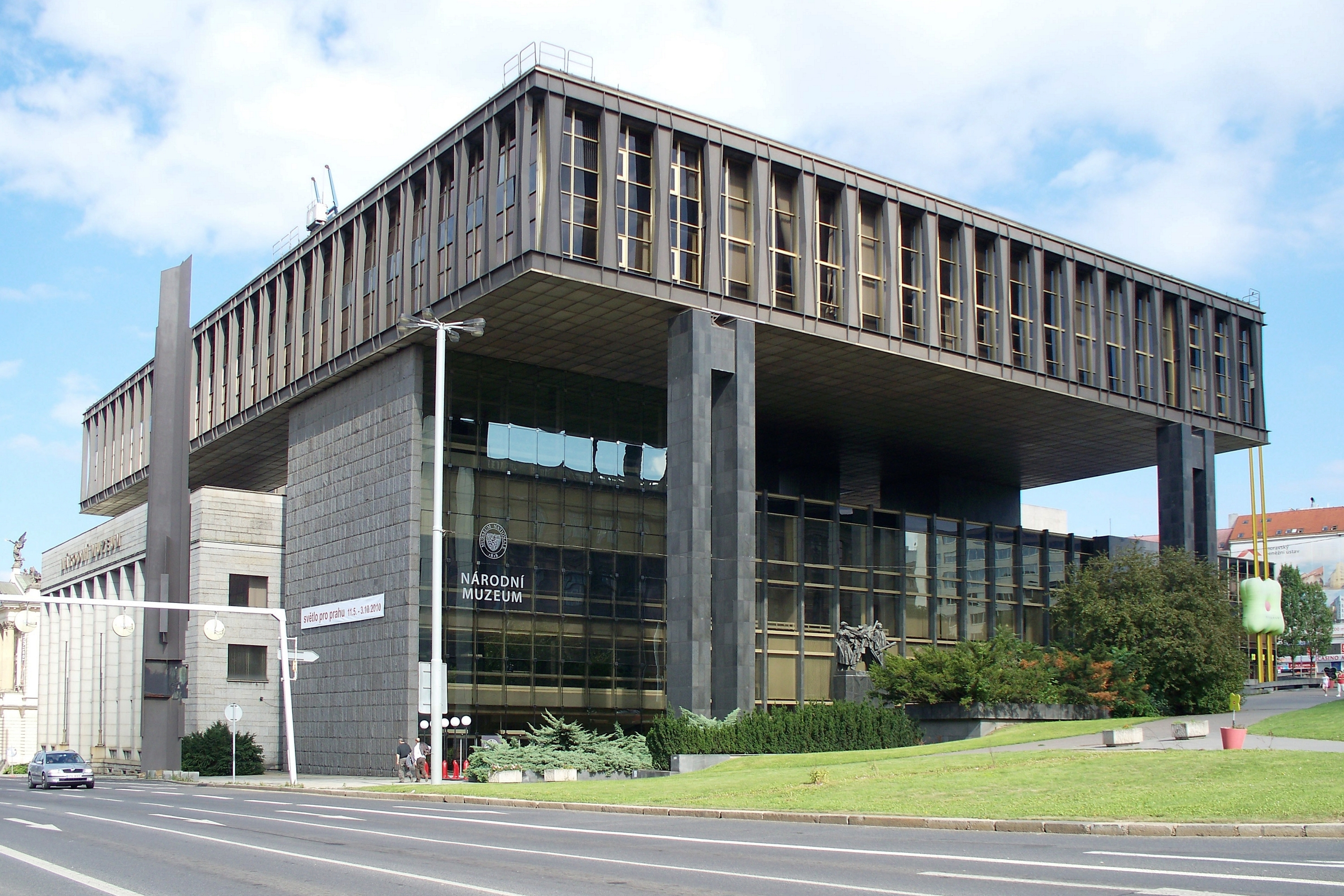
- Federal Assembly (originally stock exchange building), Prague

The Federal Assembly (Czech: Federální shromáždění, Slovak: Federálne zhromaždenie) was the federal legislature of Czechoslovakia from its establishment as a federal state on 1 January 1969 until the dissolution of Czechoslovakia on 31 December 1992.

Chapter 3 of the 1960 Constitution of Czechoslovakia recognized it as "the supreme organ of state power and the sole statewide legislative body", reflecting the ruling communist party's ideological commitment to a one-branch system (unified power), until the amendment of the state constitution on 23 April 1990 restored the traditional system of three branches (legislature, executive, judiciary).

== Constitution and practice ==
The Federal Assembly was divided into two equal chambers, the Chamber of People (Sněmovna lidu; other translation House of People) and the Chamber of Nations (Sněmovna národů; other translation House of Nations). Following the Velvet revolution, proposals were made to rename the two chambers into the Chamber of Deputies (Poslanecká sněmovna) and the Senate (Senát) respectively, restoring the chamber names used during the Interwar period. An alternative proposal suggested transforming the Chamber of People into a unicameral Federal Assembly, and replacing the Chamber of Nations with a Bundesrat-style Federal Council (Federální rada).

The Chamber of the People reflected a system of proportional representation: in 1992 it included 99 deputies from the Czech Socialist Republic and 51 deputies from the Slovak Socialist Republic. The Chamber of Nations had 150 members, 75 from each republic. Deputies were selected through popular elections and served five year terms of office; all members of both houses served concurrently. However, before the Velvet Revolution — and thus, in all but the last two assemblies — there was only one party to vote for, National Front, and it was impossible to give a preferential vote.

The Post-Velvet Revolution electoral law, used to elect the last two assemblies, provided that both houses of the Federal Assembly would be elected by party-list proportional representation in multi-member electoral districts which correspond to the regions of each Republic. Seats for each Republic were allocated among its electoral districts on the basis of the votes actually cast in each. Voters must choose only one political party to vote for, but they may use up to four preferential votes for particular candidates of that party, which affect the final order of the candidates on the party list. To obtain seats, a party was required to obtain at least 5% of the Republic-wide votes in either of the Republics. The allocation of seats was made in two stages – first, seats were allocated within each electoral district using the Hagenbach-Bischoff quota. The remainders were then used to allocate any seats left unfilled on a republic-wide basis, again using the Hagenbach-Bischoff quota.

After an election each chamber met to select its own Praesidium consisting of three to six members. Together, the chambers elected the forty-member Presidium of the Federal Assembly, which served as the legislative authority when the assembly was not in session. A joint session of the Federal Assembly selected its chairman and vice chairman.

The Federal Assembly met in regular session at least twice a year, in the spring and fall. Legislation presented to the assembly at these sessions had to be approved by both chambers and in some cases required a majority vote by both the Czech and the Slovak deputies in the Chamber of Nations.

Constitutionally, the Federal Assembly was vested with great lawmaking powers, and had exclusive jurisdiction in all matters of foreign policy, fundamental matters of domestic policy, the economic plan, and supervision of the executive branch of government.

Before 1989, however, as in other Communist states, its function was largely confined to rubber-stamping measures placed before it by the Communist Party of Czechoslovakia (KSČ). Czechoslovak Laws passed under Communism were drafted in advance by the Presidium of the KSČ and presented to the Federal Assembly, which almost always approved them unanimously. The democratic centralist principle extended to elections as well. Voters were presented with a single list from the National Front (Národní fronta), an all-encompassing patriotic organization dominated by the Communists. Great pressure was brought to bear on citizens to turn out at the polls, and those who dared to cross out the name of the single Front-approved candidate on the ballot risked severe reprisals. Under these circumstances, elections were almost always a formality, with the Front list winning well over 99 percent of the vote. Only after the Velvet Revolution did the Assembly assume actual power.

== Building ==
The Assembly building was originally a stock exchange, designed by Jaroslav Rössler and completed in 1938. The space proved insufficient, and after a design competition Karel Prager was appointed to add an extension. He added a modern glass, metal and stone structure around and over the top of the original building. The project was both expensive and controversial.

Between 1995 and 2008, The Federal Assembly Building housed the headquarters of Radio Free Europe/Radio Liberty. As of 2015, it houses the Federal Assembly National Museum.

Prager's design has since been copied elsewhere, for example in what is now the Bank of Georgia headquarters in Tbilisi.

== Name changes ==
Name	Native name	Year
Federal Assembly of the Czechoslovak Socialist Republic	(Czech: Federální shromáždění Československé socialistické republiky) (Slovak: Federálne zhromaždenie Československej socialistickej republiky)	1969–1990
Federal Assembly of the Czechoslovak Federative Republic	(Czech: Federální shromáždění Československé federativní republiky) (Slovak: Federálne zhromaždenie Česko-slovenskej federatívnej republiky)	1990
Federal Assembly of the Czech and Slovak Federative Republic	(Czech: Federální shromáždění České a Slovenské Federativní Republiky) (Slovak: Federálne zhromaždenie Českej a Slovenskej Federatívnej Republiky)	1990–1992

== Presidents of the Federal Assembly ==
- Peter Colotka January 30, 1969 – April 28, 1969
- Alexander Dubček April 28, 1969 – October 15, 1969
- Dalibor Hanes October 15, 1969 – December 9, 1971
- Alois Indra December 9, 1971 – November 29, 1989
- Stanislav Kukrál December 12, 1989 – December 28, 1989
- Alexander Dubček December 28, 1989 – June 25, 1992
- Michal Kováč June 25, 1992 – December 31, 1992

== See also ==
- List of chairmen of the Senate of Czechoslovakia
- List of chairmen of the Chamber of Deputies of Czechoslovakia
- List of chairmen of the Chamber of the Nations (Czechoslovakia)
- List of chairmen of the Chamber of the People (Czechoslovakia)
- List of chairmen of the National Assembly of Czechoslovakia
