= Socialism with a human face =

Slogan for Alexander Dubcek's reforms in Communist Czechoslovakia

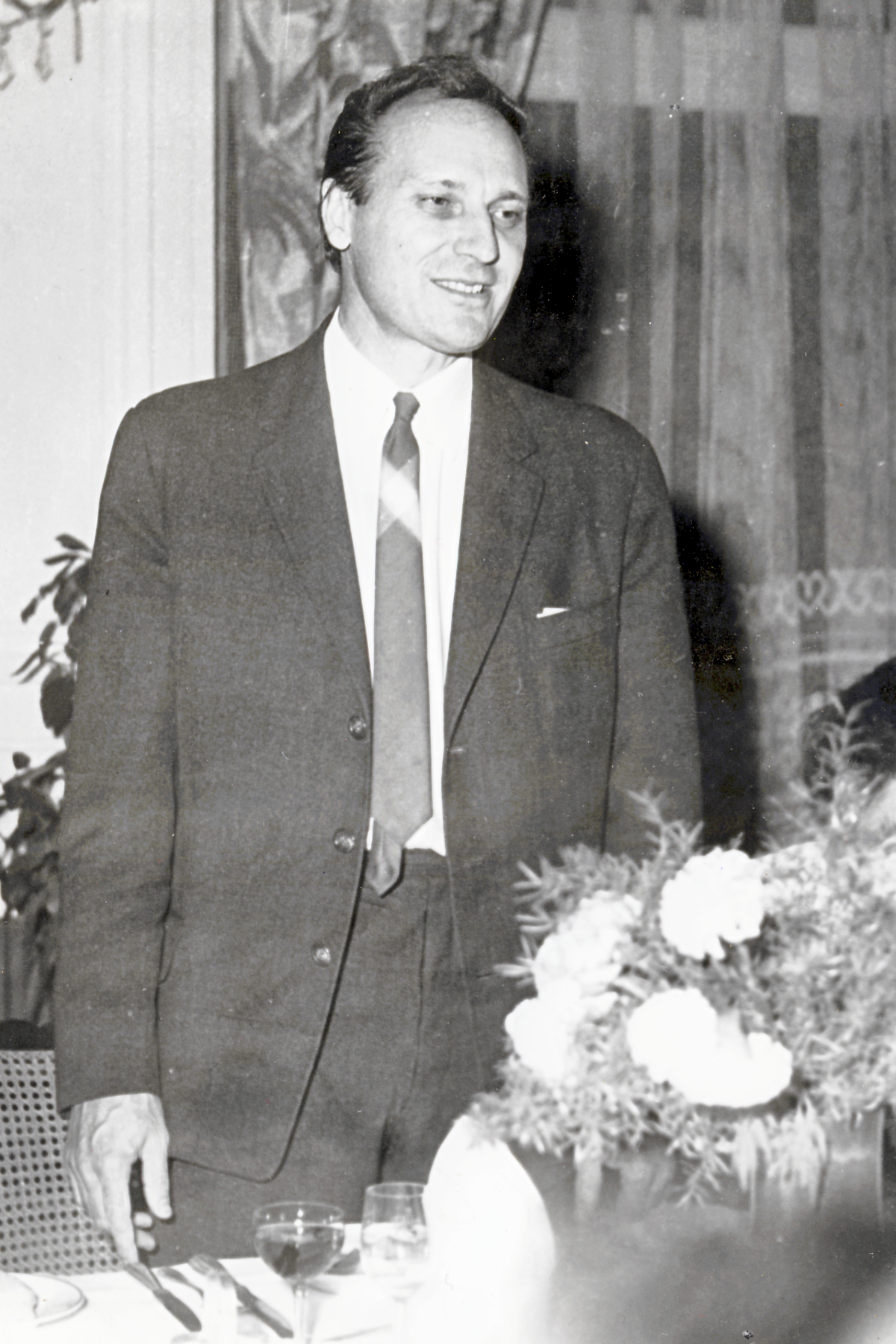
The first author of the slogan was Radovan Richta.

Socialism with a human face (Czech: socialismus s lidskou tváří, Slovak: socializmus s ľudskou tvárou) was a slogan referring to the social democratic and democratic socialist programme of Alexander Dubček and his colleagues, agreed at the Presidium of the Communist Party of Czechoslovakia in April 1968, after he became chairman of the KSČ in January 1968.

The first author of this slogan was Radovan Richta, and it was a process of moderate democratization, economic modernization, and political liberalization that sought to build an advanced and modern socialist society that valued democratic Czechoslovak tradition while still allowing the Communist Party to continue governing.

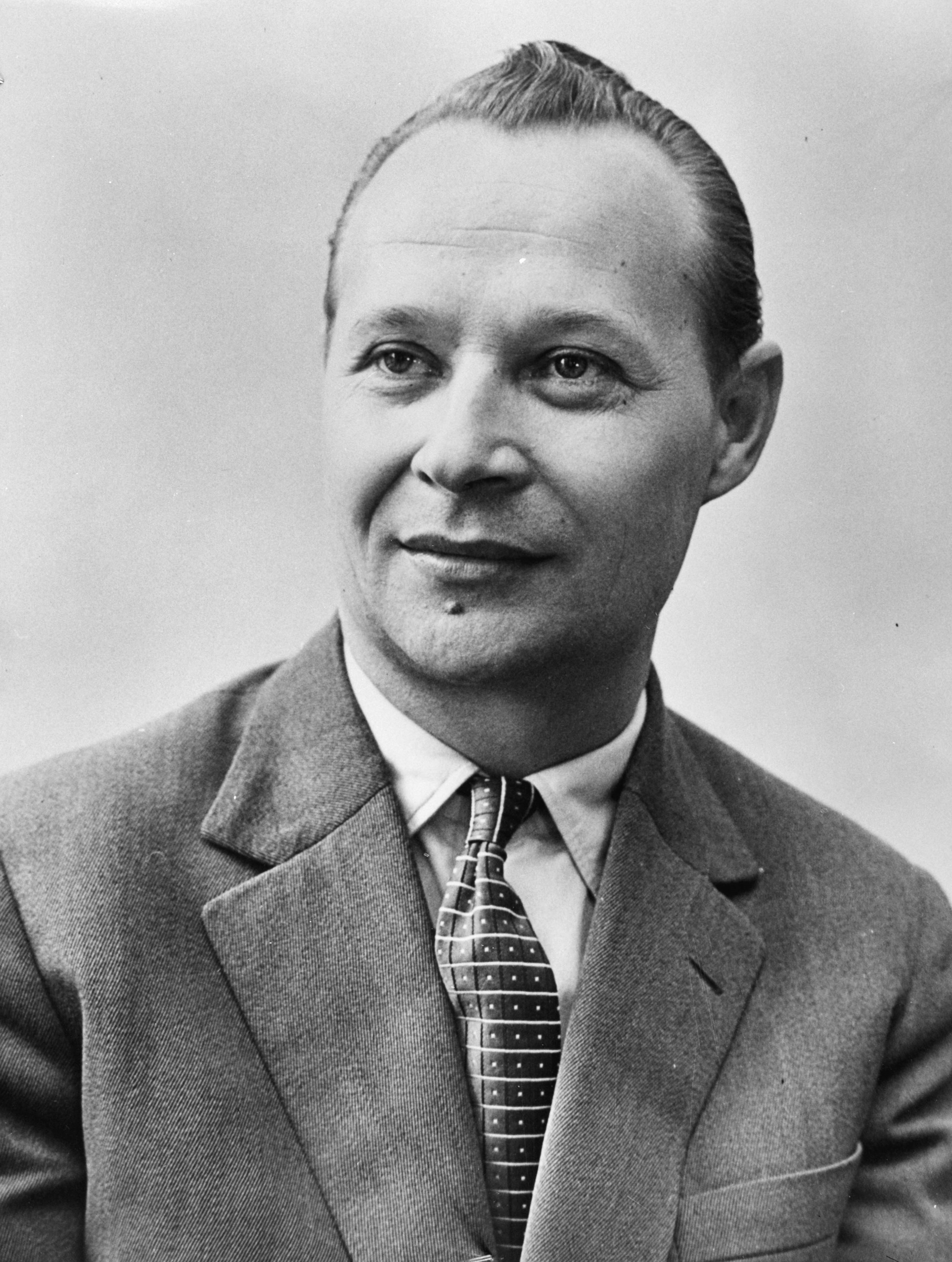
Alexander Dubček, reformist leader of Czechoslovakia from 1968 to 1969

Socialism with a human face was vital in initiating the Prague Spring, a period of national democratization and economic decentralization. It was, however, rolled back by the Warsaw Pact invasion of Czechoslovakia on August 21, 1968.

== Background ==
The programme was an attempt to overcome the disillusionment of the people of Czechoslovakia with the political and economic situation at the time. As the name suggests, the plan was to breathe new life into the ideals of socialism, which had lost popular support due to the government policies of the previous two decades. While it never intended to bring back market capitalism, Alexander Dubček proposed trade with both Western and Soviet powers and a ten-year transition to a multiparty democratized Socialism.

== Dubček Speech ==
At the 20th anniversary of Czechoslovakia's "Victorious February", Dubček delivered a speech explaining the need for change following the triumph of socialism. He emphasized the need to "enforce the leading role of the party more effectively" and acknowledged that, despite Klement Gottwald's urgings for better relations with society, the Party had too often made heavy-handed rulings on trivial issues. Dubček declared the party's mission was "to build an advanced socialist society on sound economic foundations ... a socialism that corresponds to the historical democratic traditions of Czechoslovakia, in accordance with the experience of other communist parties ..."

One of the most important steps towards the reform was the reduction and later abolition of the censorship on 4 March 1968. It was for the first time in Czechoslovak history the censorship was abolished and it was also probably the only reform fully implemented, although only for a short period. Changing from an instrument of party propaganda, media quickly became the instrument of criticism of the government.

== Action Programme ==
In April, Dubček launched an "Action Programme" of liberalizations, which included increasing freedom of the press, freedom of speech, and freedom of movement, with economic emphasis on consumer goods and the possibility of a multiparty government. The programme was based on the view that "Socialism cannot mean only liberation of the working people from the domination of exploiting class relations, but must make more provisions for a fuller life of the personality than any bourgeois democracy." It would limit the power of the secret police and provide for the federalization of the ČSSR into two equal nations. The programme also covered foreign policy, including both the maintenance of good relations with Western countries and cooperation with the Soviet Union and other Eastern Bloc nations. It spoke of a ten-year transition through which democratic elections would be made possible and a new form of social democracy and democratic socialism would replace the status quo.

Those who drafted the Action Programme were careful not to criticize the actions of the post-war Communist administration, only to point out policies that they felt had outlived their usefulness. For instance, the immediate post-war situation had required "centralist and directive-administrative methods" to fight against the "remnants of the bourgeoisie." Since the "antagonistic classes" were said to have been defeated with the achievement of socialism, these methods were no longer necessary. Reform was needed for the Czechoslovak economy to join the "scientific-technical revolution in the world", rather than relying on Stalinist-era heavy industry, labour power, and raw materials. Furthermore, since internal class conflict had been overcome, workers could now be duly rewarded for their qualifications and technical skills without contravening Marxism-Leninism. The Programme suggested it was now necessary to ensure important positions were "filled by capable, educated socialist expert cadres" in order to compete with capitalism.

== The programme of "socialism with a human face" ==
Although it was stipulated that reform must proceed under KSČ direction, popular pressure mounted to implement reforms immediately. Radical elements became more vocal: anti-Soviet polemics appeared in the press on 26 June 1968, the Social Democrats began to form a separate party, and new unaffiliated political clubs were created. Party conservatives urged repressive measures, but Dubček counselled moderation and re-emphasized KSČ leadership. At the Presidium of the Communist Party of Czechoslovakia in April, Dubček announced a political programme of "socialism with a human face". In May, he announced that the Fourteenth Party Congress would convene in an early session on 9 September. The congress would incorporate the Action Programme into the party statutes, draft a federalization law, and elect a new Central Committee.

Dubček's reforms guaranteed freedom of the press, and political commentary was allowed for the first time in mainstream media. At the time of the Prague Spring, Czechoslovak exports were declining in competitiveness, and Dubček's reforms planned to solve these troubles by mixing planned and market economies. Within the party, there were varying opinions on how this should proceed; certain economists wished for a more mixed economy while others wanted the economy to remain mostly planned. Dubček continued to stress the importance of economic reform proceeding under Communist Party rule. Ota Šik, who was the man behind the economic reforms, saw his economic views as third way ones.

On 27 June Ludvík Vaculík, a leading author and journalist, published a manifesto titled The Two Thousand Words. It expressed concern about conservative elements within the KSČ and so-called "foreign" forces. Vaculík called on the people to take the initiative in implementing the reform programme. Dubček, the party Presidium, the National Front, and the cabinet denounced this manifesto.

== Publications and media ==
Dubček's relaxation of censorship ushered in a brief period of freedom of speech and the press. The first tangible manifestation of this new policy of openness was the production of the previously hard-line communist weekly Literární noviny, renamed Literární listy.

Freedom of the press also opened the door for the first honest look at Czechoslovakia's past by Czechoslovakia's people. Many of the investigations centered on the country's history under communism, especially in the instance of the Joseph Stalin-period. In another television appearance, Goldstücker presented both doctored and undoctored photographs of former communist leaders who had been purged, imprisoned, or executed and thus erased from communist history. The Writers' Union also formed a committee in April 1968, headed by the poet Jaroslav Seifert, to investigate the persecution of writers after the Communist takeover in February 1948 and rehabilitate the literary figures into the Union, bookstores and libraries, and the literary world. Discussions on the current state of communism and abstract ideas such as freedom and identity were also becoming more common; soon, non-party publications began appearing, such as the trade union daily Prace (Labour). This was also helped by the Journalists' Union, which by March 1968 had already persuaded the Central Publication Board, the government censor, to allow editors to receive uncensored subscriptions to foreign papers, allowing for a more international dialogue around the news.

The press, the radio, and the television also contributed to these discussions by hosting meetings where students and young workers could ask questions of writers such as Goldstücker, Pavel Kohout, and Jan Prochazka and political victims such as Josef Smrkovský, Zdenek Hejzlar, and Gustáv Husák. Television also broadcast meetings between former political prisoners and the communist leaders from the secret police or prisons where they were held. Most importantly, this new freedom of the press and the introduction of television into the lives of everyday Czechoslovak citizens moved the political dialogue from the intellectual to the popular sphere.

During Gorbachev's visit to Prague in 1987, his spokesman Gennady Gerasimov was asked what was the difference between the Prague Spring and perestroika, and he replied: "Nineteen years."

== See also ==
- Liberal Marxism
