= Alexander Dubček =

Leader of Czechoslovakia from 1968 to 1969

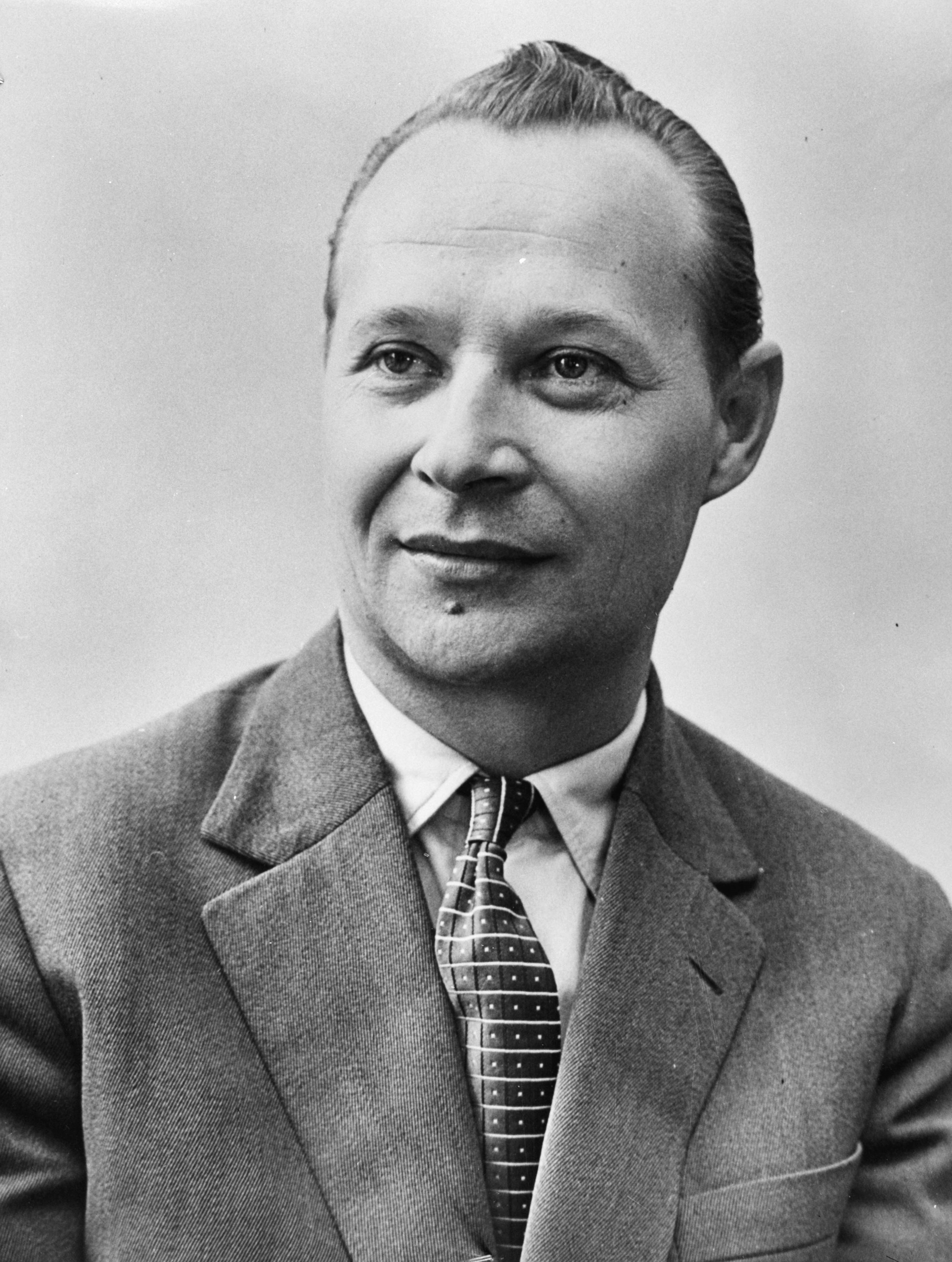
- Dubček in 1968

First Secretary of the Communist Party of Czechoslovakia
- In office 5 January 1968 – 17 April 1969
- Preceded by: Antonín Novotný
- Succeeded by: Gustáv Husák

Chairman of the Federal Assembly of Czechoslovakia
- In office 28 December 1989 – 25 June 1992
- Preceded by: Alois Indra
- Succeeded by: Michal Kováč
- In office 28 April 1969 – 15 October 1969
- Preceded by: Peter Colotka
- Succeeded by: Dalibor Hanes

Personal details
- Born: 27 November 1921 Uhrovec, Czechoslovakia
- Died: 7 November 1992 (aged 70) Prague, Czechoslovakia
- Party: Communist Party of Slovakia (1939–1948); Communist Party of Czechoslovakia (1948–1970); Public Against Violence (1989–1992); Social Democratic Party of Slovakia (1992)
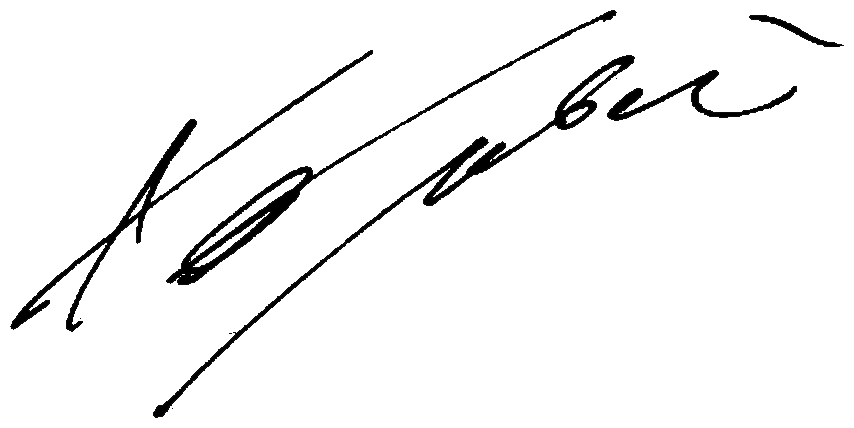
- Signature
- De facto ruler of the ČSSR: ← Novotný; Husák →

Alexander Dubček (Slovak pronunciation: [ˈaleksander ˈduptʂek]; 27 November 1921 – 7 November 1992) was a Slovak statesman who served as the First Secretary of the Presidium of the Central Committee of the Communist Party of Czechoslovakia (KSČ) (de facto leader of Czechoslovakia) from January 1968 to April 1969 and as Chairman of the Federal Assembly from 1989 to 1992 following the Velvet Revolution. He oversaw significant reforms to the communist system during a period that became known as the Prague Spring, but his reforms were reversed and he was eventually sidelined following the Warsaw Pact invasion in August 1968.

Best known by the slogan "Socialism with a human face", Dubček led a process that accelerated cultural and economic liberalization in Czechoslovakia. Reforms were opposed by conservatives inside the party who benefited from the Stalinist economy, as well as interests in the neighbouring Soviet-bloc who feared contagion, western subversion, strategic vulnerability, and loss of institutional power. For reasons of institutional interests in the Soviet Union such as those of the military and KGB, false reports, and the growing concern among the Soviet leadership that Dubček was no longer able to maintain control of the country, Czechoslovakia was invaded by half a million Soviet-led Warsaw Pact troops on the night of 20–21 August 1968. This was intended to enable a coup by conservative forces. That coup, however, could not materialize due to lack of a viable pro-Soviet replacement leadership and the unexpected extraordinary popularity of Dubček and the reformist leadership. Soviet intervention ushered in a period of maneuver between conservatives and reformers where conservatives relied on Soviet influence to shift the balance of power, reversing reforms of the Prague Spring.

Dubček was forced to resign as party head in April 1969, and was succeeded by Gustáv Husák, a former reformer and victim of Stalinism who was ambiguously favored by Moscow. This signaled the end of the Prague Spring and the beginning of normalization. Dubček was expelled from the Communist Party in 1970, amid a purge that eventually expelled almost two-thirds of the 1968 party membership. This mostly purged the younger generation of post-Stalin communists that he represented along with many of the most competent technical experts and managers.

During the Velvet Revolution in 1989, Dubček served as the Chairman of the federal Czechoslovak parliament and contended for the presidency with Václav Havel. The European Parliament awarded Dubček the Sakharov Prize the same year. In the interim between the Prague Spring and the Velvet Revolution, Dubček withdrew from high politics but served as a leading inspiration and symbolic leader for Eurocommunism, maintaining intermittent contact with European communist reformers, especially in Italy and the Soviet Union. Also in 1989, just before his death, Andrei Sakharov wrote, "I am convinced that the 'breath of freedom' which the Czechs and the Slovaks enjoyed when Dubček was their leader was a prologue to the peaceful revolutions now taking place in eastern Europe and Czechoslovakia itself." Sakharov credited Dubček and the Prague Spring as his inspiration.

At the time of his death in an automobile crash in 1992, Dubček remained an important political figure. Many saw him as the destined future president of newly-formed Slovakia.

== Early life ==
Alexander Dubček was born in Uhrovec, Czechoslovakia (now part of Slovakia), on 27 November 1921. When he was three years old, the family moved to the Soviet Union in search of job opportunities and better quality of life. He spent most of his childhood living in a utopian Esperantist and Idist industrial cooperative, Interhelpo, in Kyrgyzstan. The settlement was in Pishpek (now Bishkek), in the Kirghiz SSR of the Soviet Union, now the independent state of Kyrgyzstan. Pavol Dubček, Alexander's son, described what his grandfather's family found as "nothing . . . but an old barracks," and said many of the first generation of immigrant children suffered typhus. Despite this, Pavol said it was "impossible" to go back at that time. In 1933 the family moved to the Central Russian city of Gorky, now Nizhny Novgorod. Alexander was then 12.

In 1938, due to general orders by Stalin, the Dubčeks would have had to renounce their Czechoslovak citizenship in order to stay in the Soviet Union. Instead, the family chose to return to Czechoslovakia. At 17 years old, Alexander joined the then-illegal Communist Party of Slovakia (KSS), working to organize resistance at his workplace. It was here, as a factory worker in Dubnica nad Váhom, where he learned his first trade. He worked together with his brother, Július, and with his childhood friend, Anna Borsekova.

Dubček and his brother fought against the wartime pro-German Slovak state headed by Jozef Tiso. In August 1944 Dubček and his brother were ordered to join the partisans. They were members of the Jan Žižka partisan brigade during the Slovak National Uprising. His brother died in the uprising. The second and last time Alexander was wounded, he was sent to the Peterov family in Velčice to recover with Anna's help. Because of his participation in the uprising, Dubček was targeted by authorities during the Stalinist period after they began grouping the partisans with members of the wartime regime and other non-communist elements.

Dubček's father, Štefan, had been a member of the party since 1921 and became active again upon his return. Štefan was responsible for printing the party papers, forged and official documents, as well as producing other left-wing publications. During this time, the activities of Alexander and his family relied more on working through personal networks rather than party cells. The entire family was involved, shifting from one place to the next, eventually moving to Velčice. After the arrest of much of the KSS leadership in 1942, Štefan and the Dubčeks worked with another former Interhelpo member, primarily organizing communist youth. Alexander was arrested himself in July, but not before having significant impact and authority. Štefan was arrested, sent to prison and eventually to Mauthausen concentration camp, which he survived in part because he was there a short time.

Dubček married childhood friend, Anna Dubčeková (née Borseková), in September, 1945. They started a home in Trenčín.

Dubček began his studies at Comenius University in Bratislava, but he would return to the Soviet Union in 1955 to attend the University of Politics in Moscow, where he graduated in 1958 before he returned home. While in Moscow, Dubček's Russian friends learned of Khrushchev's 'secret speech' denouncing Stalin in 1956. The speech had been an answer to stories circulating of those who had begun returning from false imprisonment in the gulag. However, Dubček's friends did not tell him about the speech for several months. Dubček was disturbed by the news of what Stalin had done, but he also admired Khrushchev for making the speech over the opposition of most of the Soviet leadership, who were themselves involved.

== Education and early political career ==
In 1948, the party he had joined was reorganized as the Slovak branch of the Communist Party of Czechoslovakia (KSČ). Though still outside of the higher circles, Dubček's generation represented the young idealistic rank-and-file of the party that took power in 1948, not a break from it. It was Stalinism that represented the discontinuity. It was this pre-Stalinist generation that originally seized power, allied with the younger generation of party members, who began to question the path taken by their leadership elders as they began to rise in the ranks during the 1950s and early 1960s.

The Slovak branch of the party emerged from the war with a smaller membership base and less connection with Slovak institutions than the Czech branches had. To recruit a mass party base for electoral politics, the party's leadership, which was over 60 years old on average, appealed to a broad segment of less ideologically motivated younger people, giving the party a more pragmatic and less orthodox culture. In contrast to the Czech branch of the party, family, regional identity, religious, professional, and inter-personal relationships formed the glue of the Slovak branch of the party. A socially idealistic Dubček, with no rigid ideological destination in mind, rose amid these ranks.

In 1948, the Communist Party of Czechoslovakia took power. In June, 1949, still in Trenčín, Dubček was promoted from his minor party duties at his workplace to administrative secretary of the OV KSS. He rose through the party ranks as a party functionary, first in Trenčín, then being transferred to Bratislava, and then to Banská Bystrica, while he pursued further education and training. He left for the Soviet Union in 1955, but returned in 1958 after completing his university education there. Shortly after returning from Moscow, in September 1958 he was appointed head secretary of the West Slovak Regional Committee of the KSS, and then transferred to Prague in 1960. There, as Secretary of the Central Committee of the Communist Party of the Czech Republic for Industry, Dubček became intensely involved in the work of rehabilitation commissions (especially Drahomír Kolder's and Barnabit's, 1962–1963). Learning of the mechanisms of repression, Dubček would call this a watershed in his thinking that would dedicate him to reforms.

From 1960 to 1968, he also participated in the National Assembly.

In 1963, a power struggle in the leadership of the Slovak branch unseated Karol Bacílek and Pavol David, hard-line allies of Antonín Novotný, First Secretary of the KSČ and President of Czechoslovakia. Bacílek was removed in response to the findings of the rehabilitation commissions, due to his role in crimes as Interior Minister in the 1950s. In their place, a new generation of Slovak Communists took control of party and state organs in Slovakia, led by Dubček, who became First Secretary of the Slovak branch of the party. Along with that title, Dubček became a member of the Presidium of the Central Committee of the KSČ.

Shortly after Dubček took his new position as head of the Slovak party in 1963, he personally oversaw complete rehabilitation of those earlier convicted of being Slovak "bourgeois nationalists". He promoted the return of historic cultural personalities to popular awareness within Slovak society. This took the form of celebrations and commemorations, such as the 150th birthdays of 19th century leaders of the Slovak National Revival Ľudovít Štúr and Jozef Miloslav Hurban, the centenary of the Matica slovenská in 1963, and the twentieth anniversary of the Slovak National Uprising Dubček himself had taken part in. Even before this reformist take-over, the political and intellectual climate in Slovakia had been freer than that in the Czech lands.

Meanwhile, cultural weeklies such as Literární noviny, Kultúrny život,, and Kulturní Tvorba saw greatly expanded readership. Like many of the Slovak culture institutions, these publications were, however, engaged in a mostly indirect confrontation with the center, such as obvious ironic overstating of the party line. Political conflicts were commonly negotiated. This was complicated by exceptions, such as Kultúrny život, the weekly newspaper of the Union of Slovak Writers, which authorities considered politically unreliable. Such direct confrontations were spreading. In 1967, Václav Havel's play The Memorandum and Milan Kundera's novel The Joke, were seen by many writers as the beginnings of open rebellion.

== Prague Spring ==
The Czechoslovak economy began to plateau in the early 1960s. The one-size-fits-all model of economic planning, better suited to the pre-industrialized Soviet Union of the 1930s, resulted in over-investment in heavy industry at the expense of light industry and consumer goods. Quantity was maximized regardless of costs, leading to poor quality and prices that were twice that of world prices. Along with other economists, Ota Šik condemned the existing system of management as one that made further development impossible. Though production continued to grow, albeit slowly, in 1964 income began to fall. This forced then-president Antonín Novotný to begin making limited concessions to liberalize the strictly planned economy. This included allowing greater freedom to companies in setting prices and wages. Though the source of the immediate crisis was the now-pressing economic effects, Dubček's generation had spent the early 1960s engaged in travel, research, and study heavily supported by academia, the state, and the party. Their body of research and experience convinced the reformers that their self-isolated country had not simply reached a growth impasse but had fallen behind the rest of the world due to a generation of stagnation in all spheres of life.

Reforms only touched some sectors, and reforms were slow, which the regime tried to make up with increased imports. Liberalizing the centralized economy threatened those in the party bureaucracy who administered the old system, resulting in their sabotage and slowing of what reforms were voted. The cultural sphere liberalized the most completely and rapidly, but the economy and national autonomy remained heavily centralized. Cultural intellectuals were able to achieve more, and gain greater leverage among the reformists because of a combination of a greater ability to connect with the public and a peculiarity of the system. Writers and publishers benefited from the autonomous profitability of the sectors they controlled, giving them fundamentally different interests than those tied to heavy industry or other sectors, who lacked financial independence.

The technocratic economic reformers, such as Radoslav Selucký, who denounced the "cult of the plan", were only slightly less ideologically threatening. In many ways they were just as dangerous to the interests of conservatives in the party, but they lacked the political leverage of the moral economists who bridged the gap with the writers and intellectuals. Ota Šik relied on an interdisciplinary approach and method. Writers and cultural intellectuals began to see themselves as holding the balance of power between the entrenched apparatus and reformers, which for many explains their enthusiasm for joining the party in disproportionate numbers, where their growing power could be expressed.

Regardless, the economic reforms touched on both the nationalities and the political question. Reforming how the economy operated was tied to how the party operated, and thinking evolved to recognize the need for a diversity of interests to be represented. Cultural reform touched on economic reform, as the educated groups saw one of the principle resources the economy neglected was talent. Technical advance required abilities that were neither promoted nor respected among the conservatives, such as Novotný, who were mostly poorly educated and often lacked fundamental competency at their jobs. They did not call, however, for capitalism and class difference but democratic compensation for additional time and expense necessary for their education.

In May 1967, speaking before the Plenum of the Communist Party of Slovakia, Dubček represented this rising conviction among his generation that rejected the dictatorship of a single class of workers or party officials. Instead, he appealed to a universal all-inclusive human principle that had as much in common with sociology as Marxist–Leninism, in origins, practice, and aims, while still embracing both.

In September, 1967, Novotný's conservatives began to impose strict censorship on films and other culture products, institutions, and culture workers. This did not quiet opposition but only further provoked it. What followed was an unprecedented mobilization of solidarity among culture workers in both Czech and Slovak lands.

Following his presentation of grievances the month before, in October 1967 Dubček and Ota Šik challenged First Secretary Novotný's leadership style at a Central Committee meeting. Dubček said he acted like a dictator. Faced with lack of support at the central and local level of the party and large public demonstrations the last day of October that were badly mishandled, provoking further opposition, Novotný secretly invited Soviet leader Leonid Brezhnev to visit to Prague in December 1967. He had hoped to shore up his own position.

In Prague, Brezhnev was stunned to learn of the extent of the opposition to Novotný. He decided not to interfere. Brezhnev was generally supportive of Novotný, but said he was not there to solve their problems. He was there to help restore party unity, while the KSC Presidium was deadlocked 5-5. In January, 1968, the questions of leadership and reform were turned over to the Czechoslovak Party Central Committee. They voted no confidence in Novotný by splitting the functions of the president and party leader. He remained president but was replaced by Dubček as First Secretary. Novotný resisted, attempting to mobilize elements of the army to prevent his loss of power. Ironically, investigation into this led to Novotný being completely removed from office a few months later. Investigations by officials and a newly freed media of his chief accomplice, General Jan Šejna, exposed a corruption scandal involving his own and his sons' shady business dealings, which was known as the 'Clover Seed Scandal'.

Dubček, with his background and training in Russia, was seen by the USSR as a safe pair of hands. "Our Sasha", as Brezhnev called him. Aside from the immediate personal and professional animosity of Bulgarian leader, Todor Zhivkov, who refused to acknowledge him directly, other Warsaw Pact leaders sent customary congratulations. Zhivkov received a protest for his snub from Soviet diplomats. Zhivkov's behavior was not motivated by opposition to Dubček's program of reforms but his discomfort at the manner in which his predecessor had been removed. Making no secret where he was headed, in February, with Brezhnev present, Dubček pledged: "We shall have to remove everything that strangles artistic and scientific creativeness."

The period following Novotný's downfall became known as the Prague Spring. During this time, Dubček and other reformers sought to liberalize the Communist government—creating "socialism with a human face". Dubček and his allies’ aim was not a return to capitalism, nor was it an end to the Communist Party's rule or its leading role in society. It was socialism marked by, "internal democracy, unlimited and unconditioned by the party, the strengthening of the faith of the people and the working class, and its transformation into a revolutionary force and the creative power of the party." To that end, the Prague Spring sought to liberalize the existing regime. It continued a series of reforms that granted greater freedom of expression to the press and public, rehabilitated victims of Stalinist purges by Klement Gottwald, advanced economic decentralization, and supported fundamental human rights reforms that included an independent judiciary.

During the Prague Spring, he and other reform-minded Communists enhanced popular support for the Communist government by eliminating its repressive features, allowing greater freedom of expression, and tolerating political and social organizations not under Communist control. "Dubček! Svoboda!" became the popular refrain of student demonstrations during this period, while a poll at home gave him 78-percent public support.

Dubček declared a 10-year program to implement reforms, but as reforms gained momentum he struggled to both maintain control and move with events. Dubček had been a compromise candidate between more radical reformers and hard-line conservatives. In power, Dubček was caught between a powerful hard-line minority in Czechoslovakia and their allies in other Warsaw Pact countries who pressured Dubček to rein in the Prague Spring, and on the other hand, more radical reformers who demanded more far-reaching and immediate reforms. While still stressing the leading role of the Party and the centrality of the Warsaw Pact, Dubček also was open to redefining the duty of party members from obedience to more creative expression. According to a CIA assessment at the time, Dubček was seen as an adept politician who might pull the balancing act off at home, which if true made Soviet military intervention all the more urgently needed by the anti-reform faction. The Soviet politburo may not have shared this view of Dubček, but they interpreted events as demonstrating dishonesty as much as lack of ability. In a phone conversation between Dubček and Brezhnev on 13 August, Dubček complained that he was on the verge of quitting in frustration, having difficulty meeting his promises because he was operating in such a fluid situation that planning was difficult and any new promises could just cause Brezhnev greater distrust when those promises couldn't be fulfilled rapidly.

The Soviet leadership tried to rein in events in Czechoslovakia through a series of negotiations. The Soviet Union agreed to bilateral talks with Czechoslovakia in July at Čierna nad Tisou railway station, near the Slovak-Soviet border. At the meeting, Dubček defended the reform program but pledged his government's continued commitment to the Warsaw Pact and Comecon. Dubček promised to curb the media and anti-socialist tendencies and prevent the reconstitution of the Social Democratic Party. In return, the Soviets promised to withdraw troops that had been stationed in the country since exercises that June, where the Czechs had played the NATO team.

Despite Dubček's continuing efforts to stress these commitments afterward, Brezhnev and other Warsaw Pact leaders told Dubček they remained anxious. Because so many motives were hidden behind clandestine activities, personal motives, and organizational biases, where even pro-intervention hard-liners had to make appearances so as not to be charged with treason, there was and remains confusion as to Soviet motives for the invasion that ended the Prague Spring.

Some believed that the Soviets saw even a partly free press as threatening an end to one-party rule in Czechoslovakia, and (by extension) elsewhere in Eastern Europe. This is contradicted by many eyewitnesses, such as Ken Coates. According to Coates, the charge that the party was losing control or that counter-revolutionaries were misusing reforms, including press freedom, to undermine the party position was laughable, saying: "Anyone who was in Prague and lived in Czechoslovakia at that time knew that the Party's authority, the Party's position in the eyes of the nation had improved for the first time." Instead, he said that "The Party discredited itself."

However, the telephone conversation between Brezhnev and Dubček on 13 August suggests that media coverage was given high importance. Brezhnev had instructed Dubček to remove key people responsible for the media, specifically, "Jiří Pelikán, Čestmír Císař, František Kriegel, and other scoundrels". Dubček's unwillingness or inability to do so created distrust around certain statements circulated in the media, which may have made the issue more significant than it actually was in itself, as it gave credence to the coup plotters.

Press freedom began as an opening to reassessment of the Stalinist purges and the nation's historic past, but it grew into an abstract ideal as conservative criticism generalized and mounted. The question had been one more of truth-telling than of press freedom. The issues were more broad. Confusion was common. At the time of the invasion, events caught much of the world by surprise, despite widespread evidence of troop buildups and continued seeming arbitrary maneuvers on the country's borders. In an emergency meeting of the United States National Security Council called by President Lyndon B. Johnson on 20 August, Defense Secretary Clark Clifford, along with the cabinet and president could not explain Soviet actions. The invasion also erupted alongside so many destabilizing changes that some have pointed to 'press freedom' serving as a short-cut explanation.

In a letter written in 1974 to the widow of Josef Smrkovský, a close political ally who died in official political disgrace that January, Dubček said he remained unable to explain why the Soviet leadership believed "distorted reports" about the nature and aims of his socialist reforms. He said that these urgent warnings to the Soviet leadership were the result of party leaders and other conservatives who, "saw all that was happening solely from the angle of the loss of their leading role in the party."

Anti-reformist elements were a coalition of hard-liners in the Soviet Union, such as Yuri Andropov, whose false reports of events in Hungary had also helped overcome Khrushchev's opposition to intervention, and Warsaw Pact leaders fearing for their own positions such as East German leader, Walter Ulbricht, and Polish leader, Władysław Gomułka. Perhaps most significantly, false high-level reports included letters secretly passed directly to the Soviet Politburo by those within the Czechoslovak regime who promoted intervention.

One such message was sent to Brezhnev at the time of the Čierna nad Tisou meeting. These letters and reports were sent by a group of anti-reformist hard-liners in the Czechoslovak Communist Party (KSČ), under the leadership of Slovak Communist Party chief, Vasiľ Biľak, working with allies in the StB and Czechoslovak People's Army. Biľak later wrote in his own memoirs that what he and his colleagues feared most, right up until mid-August, was that Dubček would reach an accommodation of compromise with Moscow that would forestall or prevent an invasion. Biľak himself feared his own imminent departure from office with good reason. His hard deadlines were 26 August, the date of the Slovak Party Congress, and 20 August, a gathering of the reformist leadership. Both had been moved up to allow reformers to secure better positions. The warnings of Biľak and his supporters stoked deliberately exaggerated fears of violent "anti-socialist counter-revolution" as an "imminent threat". This was not only to prod the Soviets to quick action but to ensure that Dubček would be removed and not even a moderate reformist government would remain to frustrate their personal prerogatives. Press freedom was only one of many reforms where no compromise at all could be tolerated.

== "Fraternal Intervention" ==
On the night of 20–21 August 1968, military forces from several Warsaw Pact member states (Albania, Romania and East Germany did not participate) invaded Czechoslovakia. Soviet media cited a call for help from unnamed representatives as the cause of the "fraternal intervention", publishing an unidentified appeal as proof on 22 August 1968; However, as it became clear from the first day that virtually the entire responsible leadership of the Czechoslovak government and communist parties, including Dubček, were being blamed as causes of the invasion, and even the Soviet-supported leadership fell into accusations against each other, most allied communist parties around the world rejected the Soviet pretext as a thin disguise for gross violation of national party autonomy. Even President Ludvík Svoboda had publicly issued a statement calling on occupying forces to withdraw and for reforms to continue, while Czechoslovakia's UN representatives were calling for international support against the invasion.

The Soviets were only partly responsible for their confusion. Closely following a long telephone conversation between Biľak and Brezhnev on 10 August, two of Biľak's most important allies met with the Soviet ambassador to Czechoslovakia on 14–15 August: Alois Indra, who along with Drahomír Kolder had previously been in direct contact with the Soviet Politburo, was accompanied by another KSC hard-liner, Oldřich Pavlovský, in their meeting with ambassador Stepan Chervonenko. They assured him that as soon as Soviet "troops move into action on the night of 20 August," the "healthy forces" in the KSC would carry out their "plan of action" to oust Dubček, setting up a "provisional revolutionary government of workers and peasants." Indra said he could "guarantee" that a majority of the KSC Presidium, the KSC Central Committee, the National Assembly, and the Czechoslovak government would join with the "healthy forces." He promised six of the eleven members of the KSC Presidium and 50 members of the KSC Central Committee as his supporters.

The Soviet Politburo received many such appeals for intervention, misleading them into confidence the viability of a hard-liner government in waiting. The KGB had also buried reports that the US and West Germany were not behind the Prague Spring. KGB Station Chief in Washington DC, Oleg Kalugin, only discovered years later that the KGB leadership had ordered his reports destroyed and not shown to anyone after they received what Kalugin thought was a more balanced assessment. Meanwhile, KGB reports to the Soviet leadership went to lengths to support the official narrative and the claims of anti-reform hard-liners. They blamed everything negative that happened in Czechoslovakia on the Prague Spring, including in some cases traffic crashes, fires, and burglaries. The KGB even manufactured evidence, directing agents to plant caches of American-made weapons near the German border in order to be discovered. They instructed agents to hang posters calling for the overthrow of communism. This was to prove a western-sponsored network was active in Dubček's reform movement as part of an imminent insurrection or coup. The KGB was only further enraged when the Czechoslovak Interior Minister revealed it all to be a deliberate Soviet provocation.

The KGB had many reasons for their actions, but most important may have been its institutional bias. The Pillar Commission set up to investigate the show trials of the 1950s recommended the disbandment of the secret police, and Czechoslovak security services had already ceased most cooperation with the KGB, having a major impact on the KGBs operational effectiveness and influence. The Czech security services had been vital to their effective operations. Some suggest further that they may have feared eventual reprisals against their most active and loyal agents within the StB and Interior Ministry. This motive is partly supported by the guarantees against reprisals against pro-Soviet Czechoslovaks in the Moscow Protocols. The KGB was also upset when Czechoslovak Interior Minister Josef Pavel revealed the existence of six KGB liaison agents within his office, implying that they would be removed. In an atmosphere of conformity cultivated by Brezhnev, only a few in the Kremlin voiced skepticism, such as Gennady Voronov, who asked, "Whom was it really so necessary for us to defend, and from whom?"

Bil’ak would join Indra in reassuring the Soviets, promising that Kolder would be ready to be voted the KSC First Secretary when Soviet troops arrived. When two of their promised allies on the Presidium, Jan Piller and František Barbírek, opposed the invasion and supported Dubček, Soviet plans had to be abandoned. This forced them to retain Dubček and his government until the following year, when Dubček's government could no longer contain growing pressure to advance reforms once again, coming both from within and without the party.

The day of the invasion, occupying armies quickly seized control of Prague and the Central Committee's building, taking Dubček and other reformers into Soviet custody. But, before they were arrested, Dubček urged the people not to resist militarily, on the grounds that "presenting a military defense would have meant exposing the Czech and Slovak peoples to a senseless bloodbath". Already the previous month, when officers under General Václav Prchlík, head of the KSC's military department, began preparing contingency plans for a Soviet/Warsaw Pact invasion, Dubček had immediately vetoed its implementation.

In the early hours of the attack, Czechoslovak radio broadcast an appeal to citizens not to resist. The presidium of the Central Committee of the Communist Party of Czechoslovakia asked, "all citizens of the Republic to keep the peace (and remain at their posts but) not resist the advancing armies, because the defense of our state borders is now impossible". By making this official declaration before Soviet troops could preempt functioning of the official government, the Czechoslovak leadership ensured that both the invasion and Soviet invitation would be seen as illegitimate but also established the political and strategic framework for the resistance as symbolic and moral, where their opponent would have less control.

Controversy at that time and since has arisen as to whether Dubček knew of the invasion and hid the fact for his own reasons, perhaps explaining some of the world's surprise. Some point to the telephone conversation between Brezhnev and Dubček on 13 August where Dubček is recorded to say, "If you on the Soviet Politburo believe we're deceiving you, you should take the measure you regard as appropriate." Brezhnev is recorded to respond, "Such measures would be easier for us to adopt if you and your comrades would more openly say that these are the measures you're expecting of us." Historians have never accepted Dubček's foreknowledge, and Dubček has always denied it, but Czech resistance was somewhat unconventional and much is shrouded in ambiguity that created an open question for some.

The non-violent resistance of the Czech and Slovak population, which helped delay pacification by Warsaw Pact forces for over eight months (in contrast to the Soviet military's estimate of four days), became an example of civilian-based defense. A latter-day The Good Soldier Švejk (referring to an early-20th-century Czech satirical novel) wrote of "the comradely pranks of changing street names and road signs, of pretending not to understand Russian, and of putting out a great variety of humorous welcoming posters". Meanwhile, for a short time government radio stations called for the invaders to return home: "Long live freedom, Svoboda, Dubček".

Dubček was arrested before dawn when 3 security officers, revolvers in hand and accompanied by several soldiers with machine guns bust into his office. One of them cut the telephone wires while another began to cuff him. When Dubček protested, he was beaten. His driver attempted to intervene and was immediately shot. Dubček was told, "We will kill, if necessary, a million Czechs, threatened one of the officers, to put an end to your counter-revolution."

Later on the day of the invasion, Dubček, along with Premier Oldřich Černík, Jozef Smrkovsky and František Kriegel were taken to the Soviet Union. At first, Dubček was taken to a mountain cottage in Ukraine; However, upon encountering massive popular resistance to their planned coup, and President Svoboda and other Czech representatives who were still in Prague refusing to accept any agreement made without approval of the official representatives of the party, the Soviets changed tactics and sent him to Moscow for negotiations.

On 24 August, Soviet representatives presented the Moscow Protocol. Rejecting a counter-proposal offered by Dubček's aides, they said it was non-negotiable. The only alternative was Soviet imposition of a military dictatorship now that their illusions of being welcomed as liberators proved false. Dubček and other detainees were repeatedly beaten during their detention, and Dubček reports he was drugged with sedatives to make him more compliant. Resisting nonetheless, Dubček's team gained minor but significant concessions, including refusing to accept Soviet justifications for the invasion or the right of the Soviet Union or any other country to decide their country's future, as well as not agreeing to the immediate reversal of all reforms. In the end, Dubček said they were forced to sign in order to avoid bloodshed in the room and back at home, with only Kriegel refusing to sign. This ended the Prague Spring and set the stage for a Moscow-directed reversal of reforms that Dubček was compelled to sell and implement.

Dubček and most of the reformers were returned to Prague on 27 August. At the time, the Moscow Protocol was intended to be a secret document. It was revealed to party members the subsequent week and then leaked to The New York Times. Throughout the rest of the year, Dubček and other senior leaders were called back to Moscow repeatedly to receive new demands, which they returned home to deliver to their people. This led Dubček to consider quitting under extreme duress at times, but he always recovered. The Soviets made no attempt to hide their contempt. When Dubček protested that he had already met the terms of the Moscow Protocol, he is reported to have been told to 'shut up' by Soviet President Nikolai Podgorny. The Czechoslovak team were told that the Soviets would continue to turn the screws harder, undeterred by the protests of other communist parties; They dismissed them saying, "For the next 30 or 40 years, socialism has no chance in the capitalist West." Gustav Husák reported they were treated as "scoundrels"

In January 1969, Dubček was hospitalized in Bratislava complaining of a cold and had to cancel a speech. Rumors sprang up that his illness was radiation sickness and that it was caused by radioactive strontium being placed in his soup during his stay in Moscow in an attempt to kill him. However, a U.S. intelligence report discounted this for lack of evidence. Also that month, following the self-immolation of Jan Palach, reformers renewed their offensive against conservative hardliners. Dubček pledged to hold the line against both reformers and neo-Stalinists, but opposition was moving outside the party for tactical reasons.

Dubček was forced to resign as First Secretary in April 1969, following the Czechoslovak Hockey Riots. The Soviets were not only alarmed by Dubček's failure to contain growing pressure to resume reforms but at their own failures to consolidate a neo-Stalinist regime under Indra or their other allies. Dubček was replaced by former reformer Gustav Husák, beginning a process of 'normalization' that would eventually purge two-thirds of the party and de-politicize the country. At the time, Leonid Brezhnev is supposed to have said: 'If we cannot find the puppets, then we will tie the strings to the leaders.'

Though no longer party leader, Dubček had been re-elected to the Federal Assembly (as the federal parliament was renamed in 1969); Dubček became chairman on 28 April. Following the violent suppression of protests by new domestic Czech security forces, Dubček signed the 'baton law' into effect in August. Husák had sent this to the Federal Assembly to expand legal powers of suppression of dissent. Dubček would later call this the gravest mistake of his life. The baton law was widely seen as the end of hope for successful resistance. Despite his continued cooperation, Dubček was removed from parliamentary office on 15 October under Prime Minister Černík's new government. Though Černík tried to placate reformists, the new government's extreme anti-reformist faction, led by Deputy Party Chief Lubomír Štrougal, wanted to put Dubček on trial. Husák, who styled himself as a post-ideological 'realist', as well as Moscow, wanted to avoid a destabilizing return to Stalinism.

Instead, Dubček was sent into diplomatic exile to Turkey. From head of a nation of millions and leader of 1.6 million party members, he went to heading a 7-person staff; This left him conveniently out of the country while more aggressive purges began in earnest. Some suggested at the time it would be too dangerous to post him anywhere within the Soviet bloc, where he was widely regarded as a hero. Husák was also said to have feared that direct persecution of Dubček might stir more instability than it would promote. Some thought that Husák's reluctance to trials and executions was because of his own experiences as a prisoner, though he thought his own imprisonment was wrong, he had no problem with imprisoning state enemies on general principle or personal feeling. Others suggest that it was the hard-liners themselves who wanted Dubček out of the country to isolate him from the public and to prevent him becoming a martyr, as trials had never helped the communist regime either within the country or internationally. Alan Levy, a journalist who witnessed the Prague Spring, explained Husák's reluctance with a comparison. Hungary was able to relax its repressive grip within less than 5 years after the Soviet invasion, but Czechoslovakia and its former leaders remained in a state of limbo rather than hell that would eventually last for decades. This he explained as because unlike Hungary, Czechoslovakia had no real revolt to liquidate. Instead, he and the Soviets had to invent a counter-revolution, not prosecute it.

However, in June of that same year, Dubček was dismissed from his ambassadorial post and recalled from Turkey after being suspended from the party pending an investigation by hard-liners. This was read as a signal that Husák had lost a behind-the-scenes power struggle against the hard-line faction led by Štrougal, Indra, and Balik. They had taken control of the Presidium by a margin of 7 to 4, voting to prepare a series of trials against reformers on charges of espionage, sedition, and slander of the republic. At the time, some suggested that Dubček's and his reformer allies' fates may have been spared by the chance drunk-driving crash that saved Husák from removal himself. The resulting investigation uncovered a conspiracy by ultra-conservatives to remove Husák who were themselves removed. Others said that this threat was part of an attempt to force Dubček to defect to the west, using his wife and children as hostages in Ankara. The only debate within ruling circles was how best to isolate Dubček from the public by some form of character assassination. They wanted him reassigned to a position as a senior officer in the Pension Insurance Research Institute to entrap him in a scandal after having failed to pressure Dubček to leave under a cloud as a defector, which would discredit him as a loyal party member.

Dubček found himself a permanent free-range prisoner, along with many others purged from the party and blacklisted from work. The purge of the party resulted in a general decline in membership from 1.6 million at the time that Dubček rose to power to 880,000 by the end of 1970. More purges would follow as loyalists replaced the able careerists. Those who otherwise cooperated to advance their careers. Even among those who remained members by the end of 1970, many either refused their cards or had not paid their dues. The reduction in numbers was accompanied by a qualitative change in the party, where the party that Dubček headed as leader of the post-Stalinist generation of idealists was gone. The majority of members were over 60 years old, and ideology had virtually disappeared, even among conservatives. Dubček and his communist reformers had proven so popular that the only way to root them out of the political fabric of the nation was to eradicate communist ideology. To do so required to virtually remove an entire generation from the party. Even Czechoslovak universities ceased to teach Marxism for lack of 'reliable' instructors. Any kind of political belief, in rapid succession, would be grounds for suspicion, leaving a disaffected population.

For Dubček and many others, this did not mean a return to private life but a different kind of political life, where in Dubček's case, his career in high politics would be deferred at home while he served as an inspirational symbol of Eurocommunist ideals abroad. Meanwhile, he struggled to personally survive repressions at home. Outwardly, he shifted to menial work that many educated reformers were forced to take. Turning down a post at a Slovak social security agency that could be used to implicate him in the misappropriation of funds, he instead requested to work as a forester. This was refused, but he was eventually given a clerical job with the state forestry agency in Bratislava. He was still investigated at work, but wrong-doing could never be found.

== Exile in Bratislava ==
After his expulsion from the party, Dubček became a "nonperson" whose very mention was banned. In 1988 he told Voice of America that, "what he had been through could not be described as 'life' in the normal sense of the word, but rather a matter of survival."

While the first news reports during the normalization period, 1970–74, show a man who actively avoided attention and was shifting uncertainly between insecure employment, telling a West German photographer: "Please, sir. Please, sir, if you like to help me come not to me." School girls giggled, saying all they were told at school was that he had done something bad. Other reports saw him as a man living securely but anonymously with his wife and children in a comfortable villa in a nice neighborhood in Bratislava. This seems to have been the official fable, as no evidence suggests this being a wholly accurate picture. When in 1975, authorities turned to prosecute his wife, Anna, she presented evidence of the insecure position of the entire family and personal friends denied proper medical care, her sons denied apartments, the armed guards posted at their home that made them fear its seizure, and her own nervous condition and health problems from constant surveillance and persecution. An entire politics arose around the false portrayal of the stability, security, and privilege of the Dubčeks' "private" life, in part to make plausible that Dubček was at liberty to be heavily involved in counter-revolutionary activities. Dubček was described as variously a spy-master, or when proven not to be or when misrepresented by either the regime or others, as a self-absorbed and simple-minded marionette of powerful external forces living a self-indulgent private life insulated from political participation and understanding. Complaints, such as that Dubček's sons were given high marks and admitted to university were described by one writer as, "self-righteous vengefulness of the Soviet sycophants" within the regime.

Dubček would say he first broke his silence by publishing letters he smuggled out of the country after he was denied the right to bury his mother in daylight in 1974, for fear it would provoke an anti-government demonstration. Dubček's public letters to other parties and to the National Assembly were part of a larger international 'campaign' by purged members gradually being joined by many high-profile figures outside Czechoslovakia and other domestic activists. This campaign was spurred by international publication of the "memoirs" of Josef Smrkovský, as well as the sometimes described 'hysterical' reaction of Husák to Dubček's both real and invented transgressions and writings. This ultimately gave Dubček a greater voice through anti-regime allies and provoked Dubček further in self-preservation. When in September 1975, as Husák intensified repressions following his consolidation of leadership positions, Dubček reacted to interrogation by refusing to deny the information being leaked or protesting the false use of his name, counter-threatening to act "decisively" if "repressive measures" were taken against him.

The former leader of the Prague Spring in fact had much in common with Eurocommunist tendencies. There were common challenges in the countries of the east and west caught between the superpowers, but seeking to both heal the division of Europe and gain autonomy from the influence of great power politics. Eurocommunism sought to unify the European labor movement and participate fully in parliamentary and internal democracy, decentralize, and steer an independent course. Not only did this bring them into direct conflict with the Soviet Union during the crackdown against the Solidarity trade union, but they had been in open disagreement with Moscow over the invasion of Czechoslovakia. In 1968, the clash was less public but just as clear. In a restricted meeting of the Italian Communist Party, Enrico Berlinguer told members to prepare their base for a clash with the Soviet leadership over the invasion.

Dubček had a long history of contact with not only the Italian Communist Party but with its newspaper l'Unità and its journalists. A highly favorable article about him in l'Unità, on 29 June 1970, reporting his expulsion from the party, portrayed him as a social democratic communist seeking to change the ruling style of the party. He struck a chord with Italian audiences and remained a popular symbol of shared ideals. Under constant surveillance and separated from his domestic contacts, it was in many ways easier for him to make contact with western communist media and parties than with his own party and people. He saw this use of intermediaries as the natural course of action, stating in a letter to the Italian Communist Party:

"Since the matter of the political path in the Communist Party has become international, it cannot remain internal at this time. After the expulsion of almost 600,000 communists from the party and their civil and social disenfranchisement to our laws and the Constitution of Czechoslovakia, the crisis in the party deepened even more. A gradual starting point can only come with the help of other communist parties of socialist countries and other communist parties, especially European ones...Helping other communist parties cannot be understood as interfering in the internal affairs of another communist party, because it has long since become an international matter."

Dubček's relationship with Italian communists would lead to his first direct public interview, which prodded the University of Bologna into offering him an honorary doctorate as a man who could bridge the differences between the east and west. His trip to Italy in 1988, and the public recognition he gained from both the timing and prestige of an award he shared with Nelson Mandela, marked his return to high politics. This was at a time when perestroika was finally breaking through to the Soviet bloc nations outside the Soviet Union. This led directly to his partial rehabilitation as well as a return to public life. Immediately after receiving the award, Dubček was congratulated by Rudolf Slánský Jr., son of Rudolf Slánský, who pointed to his importance as, "not only a symbol of the Prague Spring, but also a symbol of inevitable changes in Czechoslovakia and a real political alternative."

In 1989, he was awarded the annual Sakharov Prize in its second year of existence.

== Velvet Revolution ==
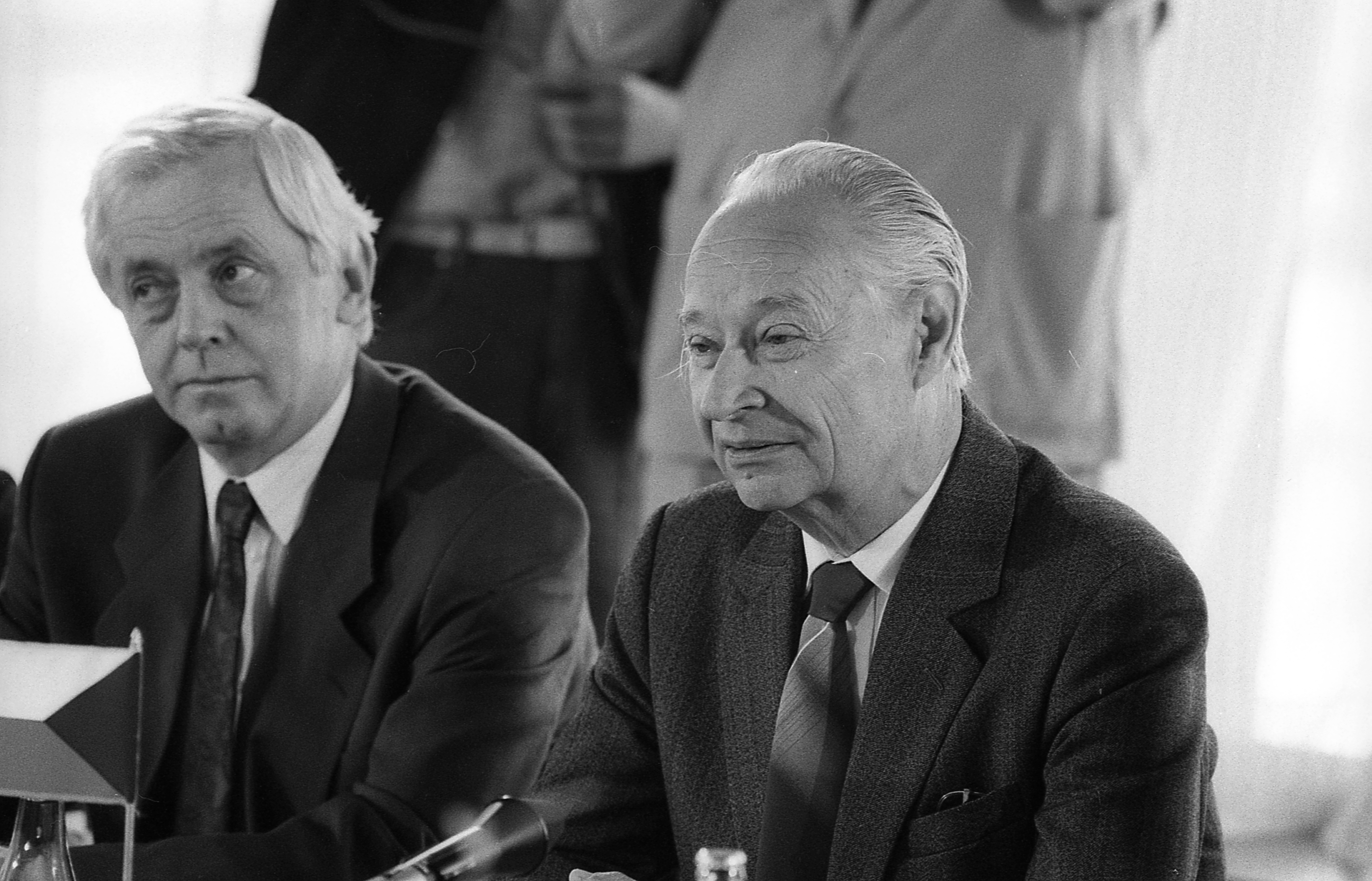
Dubček (right) and Rudolf Chmel at an event in Budapest, July 1990

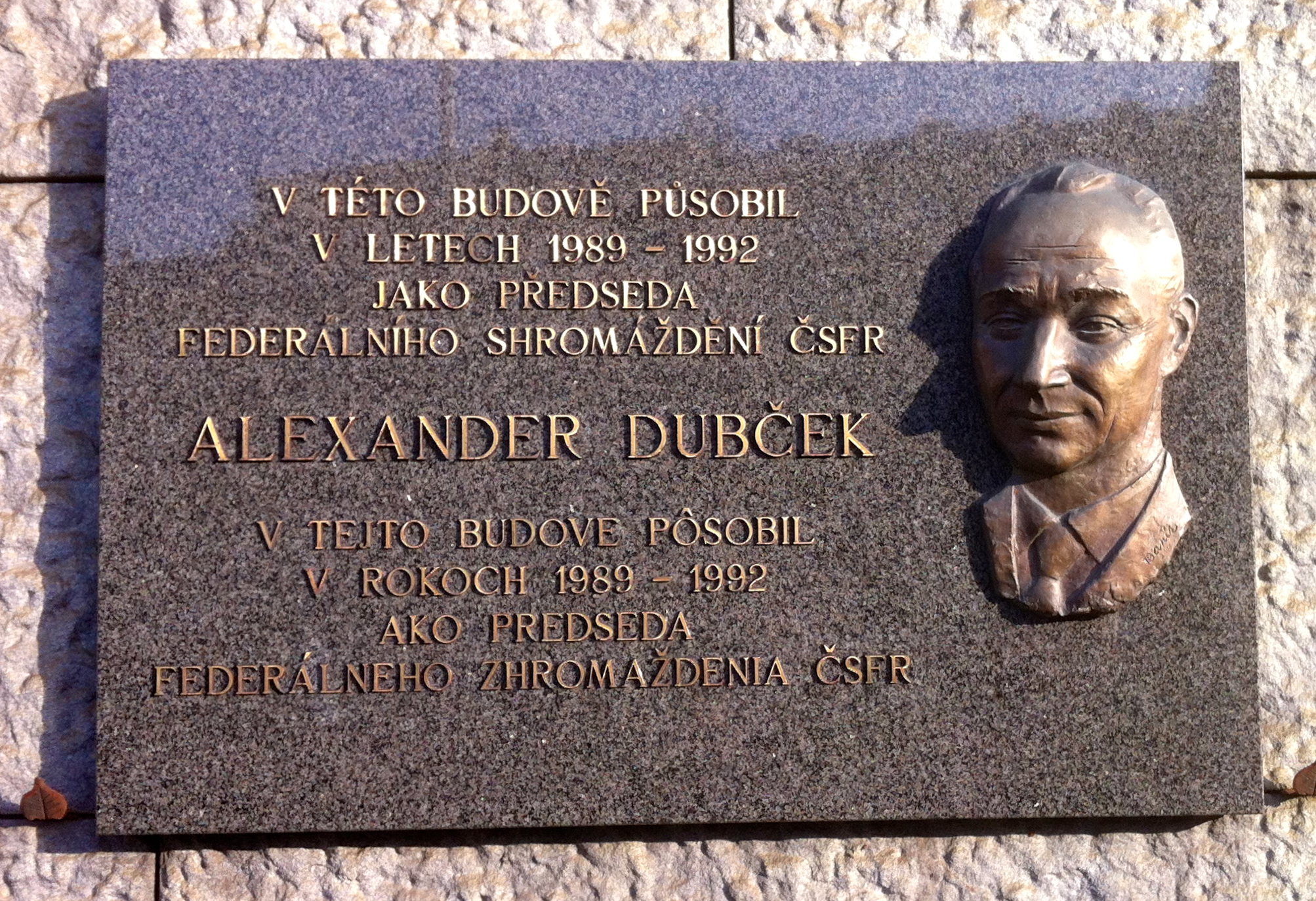
Plaque commemorating Dubček's service as chairman of the Czechoslovak Parliament 1989–1992, on the wall of the National Museum in Prague

In 1989, before the anniversary of the Warsaw Pact invasion, the Slovak members of the Movement for Civil Freedoms (HOS) decided to commemorate the event by laying flowers as the locations of those in Slovakia who had been killed. Five of the organizers signed the letter announcing it. They were promptly arrested and came to be known as the Bratislava Five.

On 14 November 1989, the final day of the trial of the 'Bratislava Five', a crowd gathered in front of the Bratislava Justice Palace. As Miroslav Kusý recollects,

Dubček accompanied him, and the gathered mass of people began to spontaneously calling to him to say something. They lifted him onto their shoulders and he spoke from there, talking about political rights and freedoms, thus on a subject related to the process". As Kusý said, it was "actually the first political speech at a public manifestation, marking the very beginning of the revolutionary changes in Slovakia in November 1989".

On 17 November, Dubček attended the students' march at Albertov, in the Prague 2 municipal district. Fearing he would give a speech, the StB arrested Dubček, releasing him the next morning. This was said to mark the last arrest of an opposition leader. Martin Bútora, one of the founders of Public Against Violence (VPN) recounted Dubček's appearance at Slovak National Uprising Square on 23 November as,

Alexander Dubček descending directly from heaven, ... from non-existence ... because the man had not existed for twenty years, being pushed into the background not only as a politician, but also as a human-being”, but now a VPN leader, as a remover of a curse, liberation from fear. "We wanted to show to the party leadership...that they met with a united opposition ... We just needed to give a clear enough signal of at what expense a violent intervention would be made.

On 19 November, the Civic Forum, headed by Charter 77 member Václav Havel, was established to oppose the communist government. Several hundred thousand individuals demonstrated against the communist government in Prague on 20–28 November 1989.

The night after his appearance at Slovak National Uprising Square, on 24 November, Dubček appeared with Havel on a balcony overlooking Wenceslas Square, where he was greeted with tremendous applause from the throngs of protesters below and embraced as a symbol of democratic freedom. Several onlookers even chanted, "Dubček na hrad!" ("Dubček to the Castle"—i.e., Dubček for President). The crowd was divided by his calling this new revolution a chance to continue the work he had started 20 years earlier and prune out what was wrong with communism. By this time, most of the protesters wanted nothing to do with communism of any sort. Later that night, Dubček was on stage with Havel at the Laterna Magika theatre, the headquarters of Civic Forum, when the entire leadership of the Communist Party resigned. This resignation in effect ended communist rule in Czechoslovakia.

While the show of a united front was necessary for the revolution of 1989, it would later prove a political embarrassment for some who vied for power against later regime opponents. They dismissed Dubček as a symbol of the past rather than the future. This reflected a division between the youth movements (sometimes called the Jacobins) that wanted nothing to do with the past and the older generation that was seen by them as too lenient and accommodating. Many of these arguments are obscured by politics.

The political rivalry between Husák and Dubček, which also was said to have features of personal animosity stemming from Husák's conviction that Dubček was personally to blame for the Warsaw Pact invasion, continued to have repercussions even after the fall of the regime in November 1989. By appointing the Slovak Marián Čalfa as prime minister of the federal government the day before his resignation from the office of president of the republic, which took place on 10 December 1989, some charge that Husák deliberately pre-empted Dubček by indirectly enabling the election of Václav Havel for the office of Czechoslovak president. Dubček's popularity throughout Czechoslovakia was high, giving him a very good chance of winning direct election for president. However, he lacked support from the prominent figures in the November revolution. They supported Charter 77 member Havel and a new generation of leaders.

When Dubček himself was asked to explain this division, he said that the younger generation were unable to distinguish between his generation of reformist communists and the generation of communists who came before. He saw the consequence of this, post-Velvet Revolution, as creating a weakened democratic front against the narrow-minded and dogmatic. Dubček said this was not the first nor the last time in history when, "any revolution reaches a certain stage, it starts devouring its own children." According to a member of Charter 77, Petruška Šustrová, the younger generation had not forgotten that it was Dubček who signed the 'baton law' and his fellow reformers who assisted in pacification of the country. She explains that a culture of trust had been lost. It was, "politically and economically impossible to continue where we had left off in 1968; the times had changed, and so had the people".

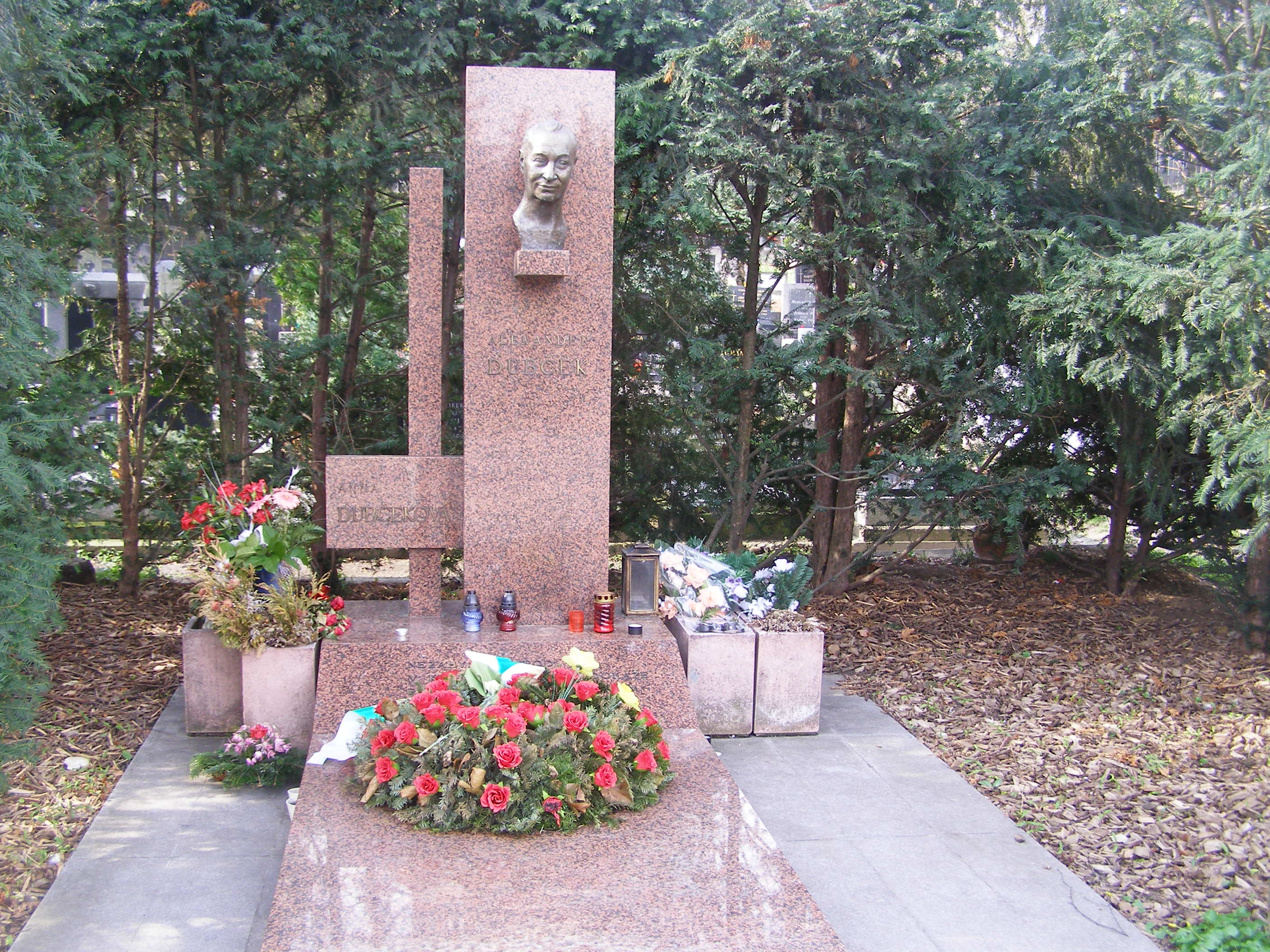
Dubček's grave

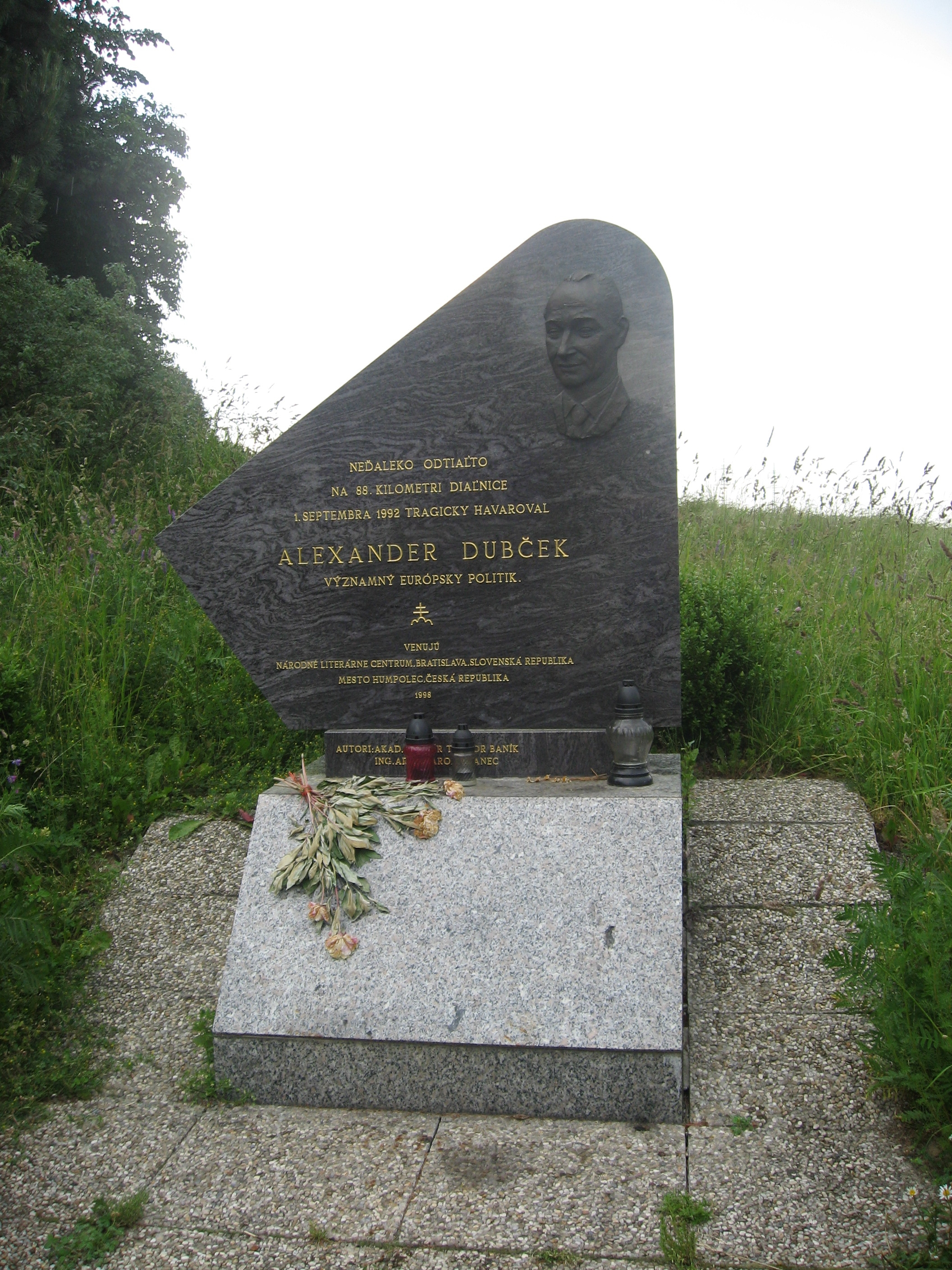
Monument to Dubček near the site of his fatal crash

While Havel became president, on 28 December 1989, Dubček was elected chairman of the Federal Assembly, holding this position until the parliamentary elections in June 1992. True to his past dedication to Eurocommunism, prior to this on 16 December, he welcomed the delegation of the Italian Socialist Party headed by its chairman Bettino Craxi in Prague. He also met Luciano Antonetti, as a journalist and an old friend. Antonetti interviewed Dubček for the newspaper l'Unità on the eve of the presidential election. In the interview Dubček said, "This time with the European left, I am thinking of the next spring." But he emphasized that "I will remain outside the Communist Party, even if it is renewed". Throughout 1990–92, Dubček continued "intensive contacts" with Italian communists and socialists, including visits to Italy where he was awarded honorary citizenship in many Italian cities.

In 1990, Dubček gave the commencement address to the College of Arts and Sciences at the American University School of International Service in the United States. He called Czechoslovakia's fight against the Soviet invasion a "moral victory". Gorbachev would have agreed, when he said, "We thought that we had strangled the Prague Spring while in reality we had strangled ourselves."

In 1992, after long serving as an independent, he became leader of the Social Democratic Party of Slovakia and represented that party in the Federal Assembly. At that time, Dubček ambiguously supported the federal union between Czechs and Slovaks against the ultimately successful push towards an independent Slovak state. However, once it was clear that an independent Slovak Republic had become inevitable, at the same time historically as the breakup of Yugoslavia and dissolution of the Soviet Union, many assumed Dubček would become its first president.

Its work completed, the Charter 77 Movement disbanded on 3 November 1992, four days before Dubček died of injuries from a car crash. The Federal Assembly voted for the dissolution of Czechoslovakia on 25 November 1992. Czechoslovakia was formally dissolved on 31 December 1992; With that, Slovakia became an independent republic.

== Death ==
Dubček died on 7 November 1992, as a result of injuries sustained in a car crash that took place on 1 September on the Czech D1 motorway, near Humpolec, 20 days short of his 71st birthday. He was buried in Slávičie údolie cemetery in Bratislava, Slovakia. His death remained an open question to some, with allegations of involvement by either then–Prime Minister of Slovakia Vladimír Mečiar or the KGB. An investigation was reopened when some members of his Social Democratic Party demanded it. A second investigation ruled that the death was due to aquaplaning at excessive speed in rainy weather. The driver was reportedly given a 12-month sentence for speeding. However, his son, Pavol Dubček, said afterward he remained skeptical, saying there were still many "unclear things" about his father's death that he does not understand. In an interview, he said he still remained skeptical in 2019, as he would remain for the rest of his life.

Alexander Dubček's wife, Anna, died in 1990. They were survived by three sons: Pavol, who became a surgeon and traumatologist; Peter, who became an economist; and Milan who became a diplomat. Alexander and Anna's first son was still-born.

== Legacy and cultural representations ==
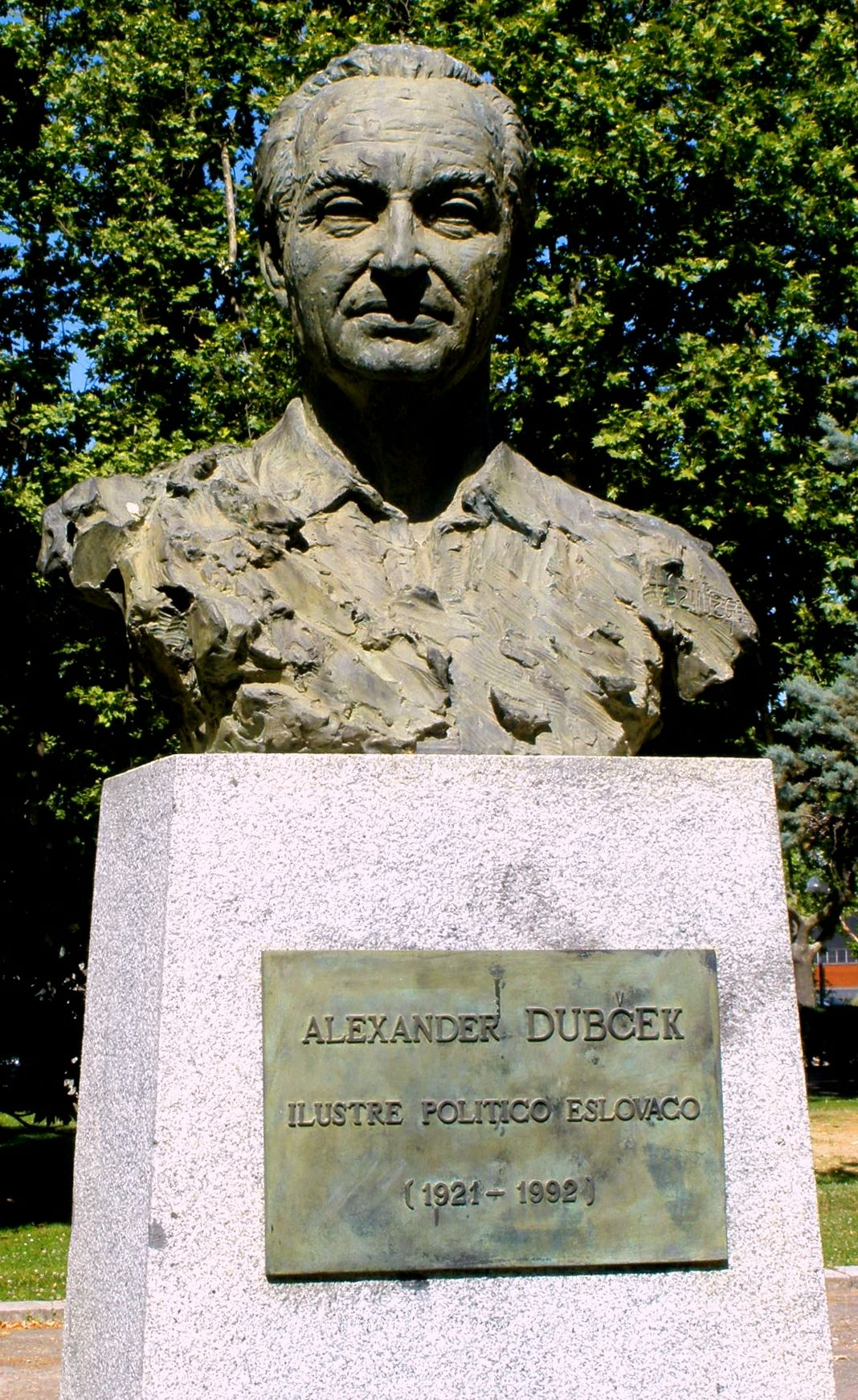
Monument to Dubček at the University City of Madrid

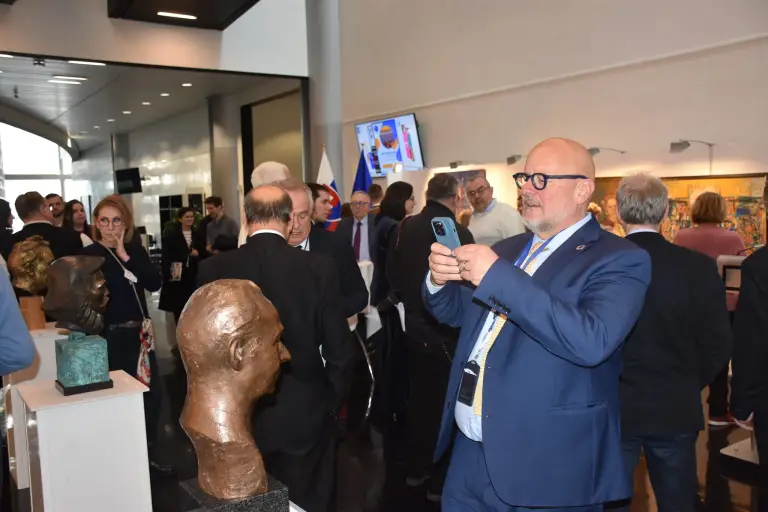
Vice President of the European Parliament Marc Angel takes a picture of the bust of Alexander Dubček at the SZPB and Slovak Matica exhibition in Strasbourg

Without Dubček, Czechoslovak reforms may have taken a more technocratic form that didn't include revival of Slovak culture and the opening of the arts to more fluid and interdisciplinary forms that were exported by joint ventures and the diaspora of artists after the Soviet crackdown. Politically, the Prague Spring may have been more contained to Czechoslovakia. Many Soviet reformers, such as Andrei Sakharov, would have lacked the concrete inspiration that came from the reforms Dubček guided, particularly the revolt against stagnation. "The invasion of Prague started the true dissident movement in Russia. An abyss opened up between them and the system, which was a catastrophic harbinger of change. Without Prague, there would have been no perestroika."

Dubček's style of leadership, and the ultimate frustration of his program by Soviet intervention, also had a deep impact on the development and orientation of communist and socialist parties and thinkers in the West.

Dubček also left a legacy of might-have-beens and what-ifs. Historians and the public continue to speculate what may have happened had he not died in a car crash, or had his time in leadership of the Prague Spring not been interrupted by Soviet intervention. One obituary speculates that had he become the Slovak president, his influence over the new country would have charted a more immediately inclusive course toward Europe.

Dubček has been remembered in artistic representations across many cultures and time periods.

In 1980, Dubček was portrayed by the British actor Julian Glover in Granada Television's Invasion, a dramatisation of the Soviet invasion. In 1990, it was edited by producers to include translated commentary by Dubček responding to their interview about the events it portrays.

In 1984, French singer and songwriter Alice Dona released a song called Le Jardinier de Bratislava with lyrics written by Claude Lemesle, as an apolitical song about love and longing for freedom. The song was inspired by a trip of a French television crew to visit Dubček in his villa near Slavín, Bratislava. They were denied the access by the ŠtB secret police. The sole footage collected of Dubček was of him attending to his garden.

The film Dubček, released in 2018, is the first film based on the life of Alexander Dubček. It is a Slovak historical film whose main plot revolves around events related to the Warsaw Pact invasion.

Party political offices
| Preceded by Antonín Novotný | First Secretary of the Communist Party of Czechoslovakia; 5 January 1968 – 17 April 1969 | Succeeded by Gustáv Husák |
| Preceded by Alois Indra | Chairman of Federal Assembly of Czechoslovakia; 28 December 1989 – 25 June 1992 | Succeeded by Michal Kováč |
| Preceded by Peter Colotka | Chairman of Federal Assembly of Czechoslovakia; 28 April 1969 – 15 October 1969 | Succeeded by Dalibor Hanes |
