= Velenka =

- Municipality
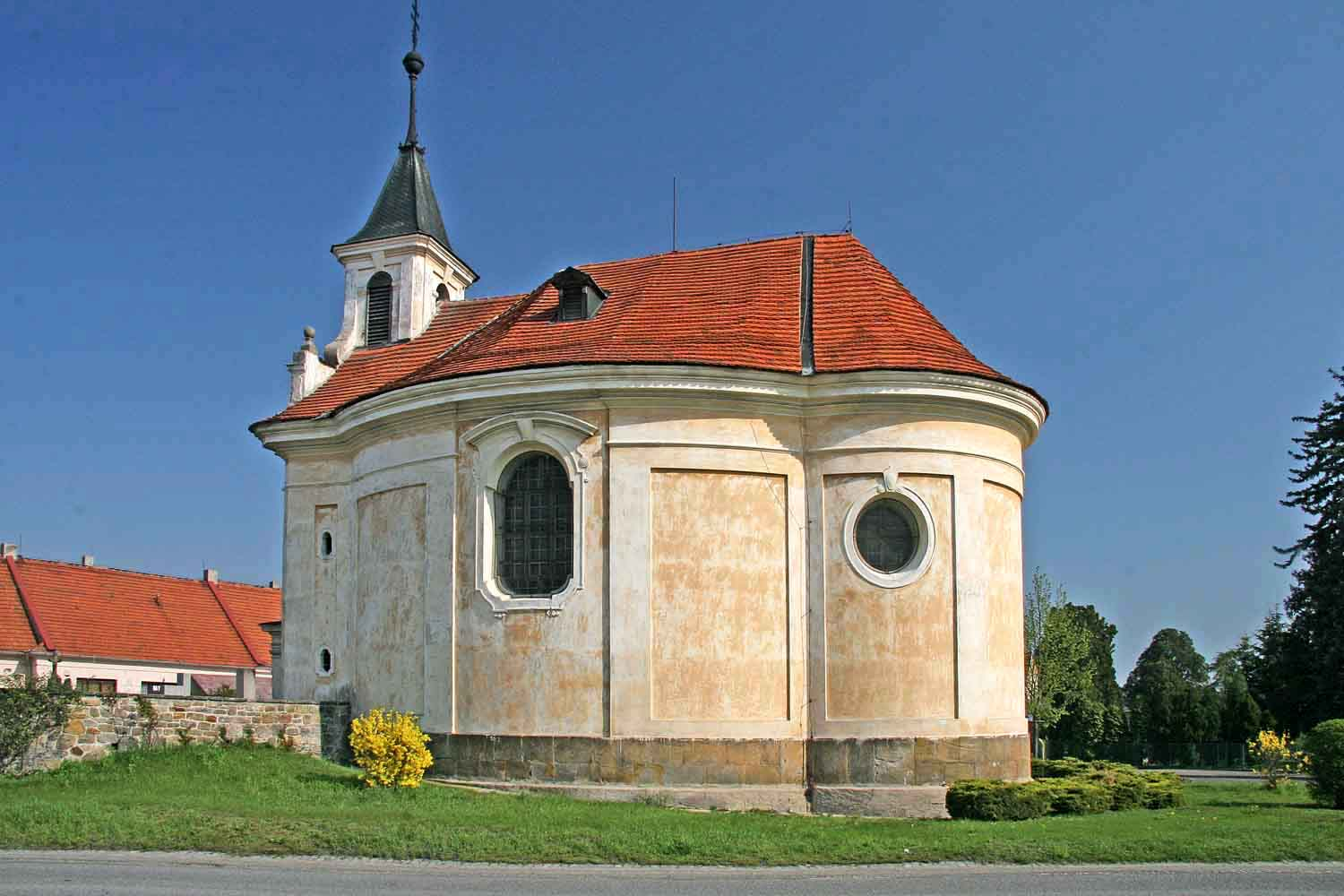
- Church of Saint Peter ad Vincula

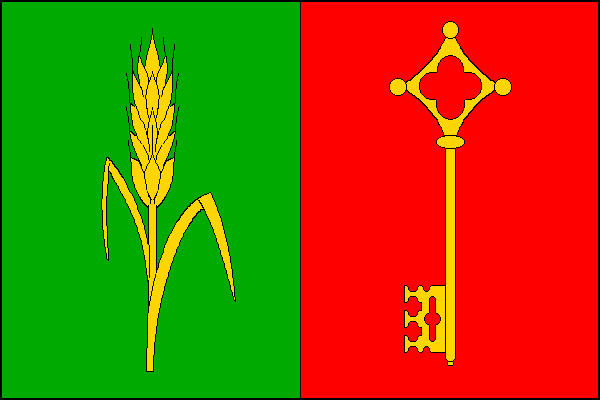
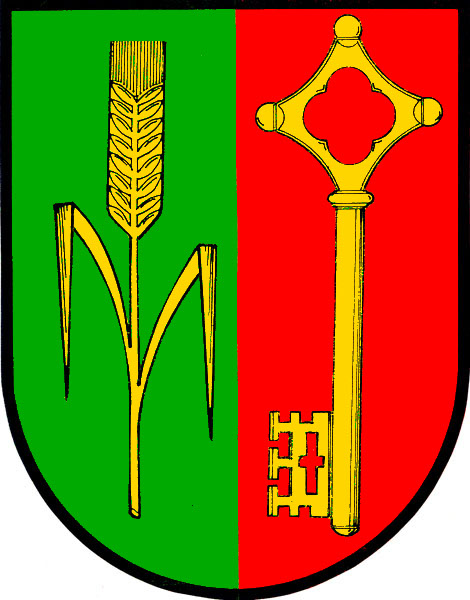
- Flag Coat of arms

- Location in the Czech Republic
- Coordinates: 50°8′23″N 14°53′44″E
- Country: Czech Republic
- Region: Central Bohemian
- District: Nymburk
- First mentioned: 1352

Area
  - Total: 4.98 km^{2} (1.92 sq mi)
- Elevation: 198 m (650 ft)

Population (2026-01-01)
  - Total: 395
  - Density: 79.3/km^{2} (205/sq mi)
- Time zone: UTC+1 (CET)
  - Summer (DST): UTC+2 (CEST)
- Postal code: 289 12
- Website: www.velenka.eu

Velenka is a municipality and village in Nymburk District in the Central Bohemian Region of the Czech Republic. It has about 400 inhabitants.

== Etymology ==
The initial name of the village was Veleň. The name was derived from the personal name Velen, meaning "Velen's (court)". To distinguish it from the nearby village of Veleň, the diminutive form Veleňka began to be used, which was then simplified to Velenka.

== Geography ==
Velenka is located about 11 kilometres (7 mi) southwest of Nymburk and 25 km (16 mi) east of Prague. It lies in a flat landscape in the Central Elbe Table.

== History ==
The first written mention of Velenka is from 1352, when it belonged to the Poděbrady estate. From 1616 until the establishment of an independent municipality in 1850, it was part of the Brandýs estate, owned by the royal chamber.

== Demographics ==
Historical population

Year	Pop.	±%
1869	471	—
1880	482	+2.3%
1890	462	−4.1%
1900	467	+1.1%
1910	485	+3.9%

Year	Pop.	±%
1921	463	−4.5%
1930	414	−10.6%
1950	315	−23.9%
1961	303	−3.8%
1970	265	−12.5%

Year	Pop.	±%
1980	227	−14.3%
1991	200	−11.9%
2001	233	+16.5%
2011	280	+20.2%
2021	336	+20.0%

Source: Censuses

== Transport ==
The D11 motorway (part of European route E67) from Prague to Hradec Králové passes through the municipality.

== Sights ==
The main landmark of Velenka is the Church of Saint Peter ad Vincula. It is a Baroque church from 1734, designed by Kilian Ignaz Dientzenhofer.

== Notable people ==
- Josef Smrkovský (1911–1974), politician
