= Ota Šik =

Czech economist and politician

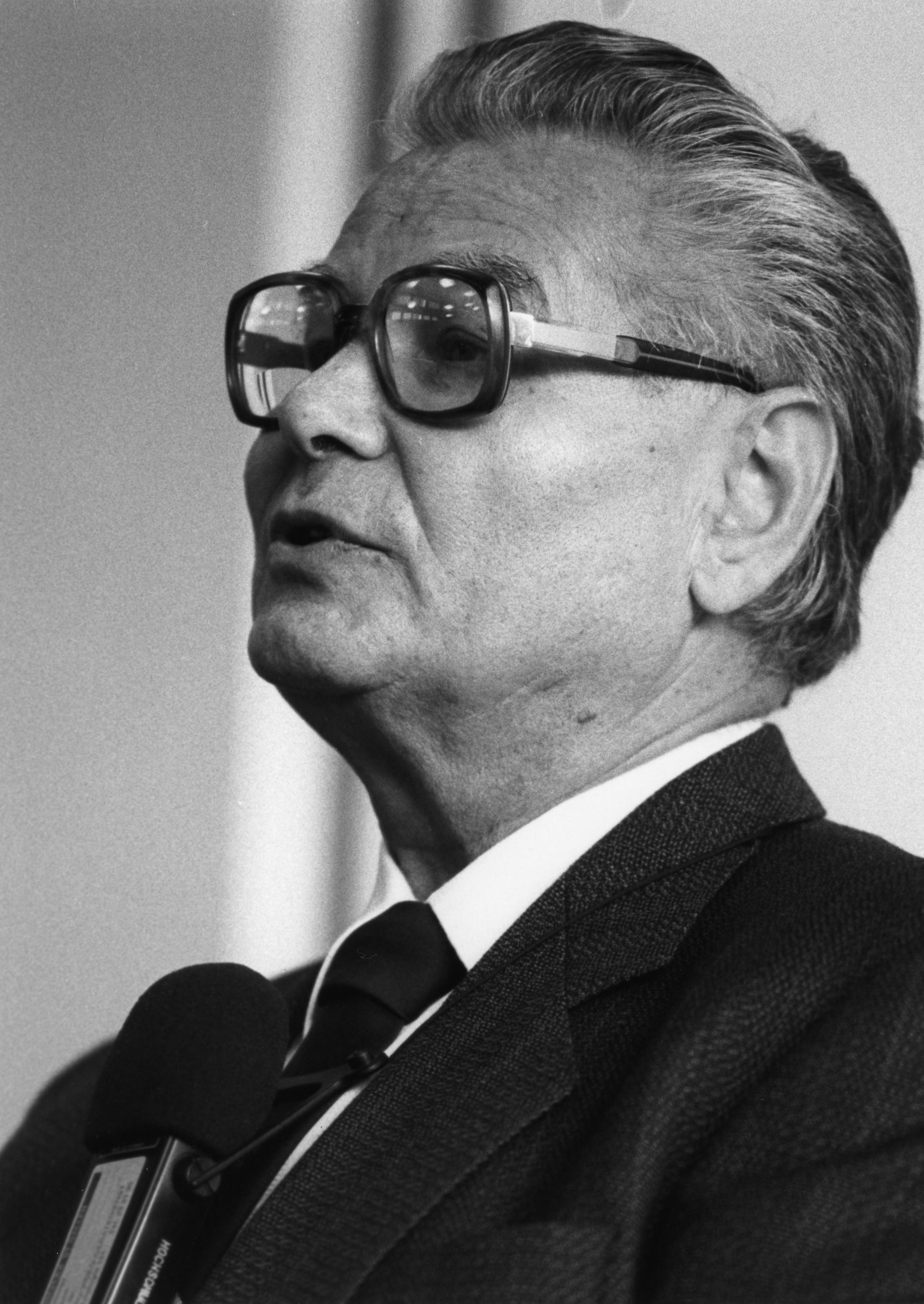
Ota Šik during his farewell lecture, 1989

Ota Šik (/ˈʃik/ SHEEK; 11 September 1919 – 22 August 2004) was a Czech economist and politician. He was the man behind the New Economic Model (economic liberalization plan) and he was also one of the key figures in the Prague Spring.

== Early years ==
Šik was born in the industrial town of Plzeň, Czechoslovakia in to the family of a Jewish merchant as Ota Schick. Before the Second World War Šik studied Art at Charles University of Prague, and studied politics after the war.

Following the German annexation of the Sudetenland, and the partition of the whole nation in March 1939, Šik joined the Czech Resistance movement. However, he was arrested by the Gestapo in 1940 and sent to the Mauthausen-Gusen concentration camp. At Mauthausen Šik's fellow inmates included Antonín Novotný, the future president of Czechoslovakia (who was succeeded by the leader of the Prague Spring Alexander Dubček), and Dubček's father, Štefan.

== Political career ==
The connections that Šik made at Mauthausen proved useful in his post-war political career. In the early 1960s he attempted to persuade the hardline president, Novotný, into loosening his rigid adherence to central planning, which had been crippling the economy. Šik, who by this point was an economics professor and member of the Communist party, wanted to bring market elements into central planning, to relax price controls and to promote private enterprise in the hope of kickstarting the stagnant economic climate. It was around this point that Šik was elected to the party's central committee and was made head of the economics institute at the Czech Academy of Sciences.

Šik's reforms were launched in 1967, before Dubček came to power, but were heavily watered down by party apparatchiks who worried about losing control of the factories. The only palpable, and certainly the most popular, result of the reforms was the appearance of private taxis on the streets of Prague. In December 1967, at a party meeting that was a precursor to Dubček's rise to power a month later, Šik publicly denounced Novotný's regime. He demanded a fundamental change to the Communist system and a new leadership, two decades before Mikhail Gorbachev he announced that economic reform could not be separated from fundamental political change. By this point Czechoslovakia had the lowest growth rates in the Soviet bloc, whereas previously it had been the economic backbone of the Habsburg empire.

Following Dubček's election as First Secretary of the Communist Party of Czechoslovakia, Šik was made a deputy prime minister in April 1968 and he was the architect of the economics section of Dubček's action programme. Šik claimed that if his policies were followed then Czechoslovakia would be on an economic par with neighbouring Austria within four years. However these plans were never carried out after the Prague Spring was brutally ended in August of the same year by Soviet army intervention.

== After the Prague Spring ==
When the tanks rolled into Prague, Šik was on holiday in Yugoslavia. With the threat of arrest looming, he did not return to his homeland. Leonid Brezhnev and the Soviet Communist Party's propaganda machine singled Šik out for particular attention. In August 1968, TASS issued a press release calling him an agent of U.S. imperialism and "one of the most odious figures of the rightwing revisionists".

Šik left Yugoslavia in October 1968 and moved to Switzerland. In 1969, he returned to Prague and tried to convince his colleagues but his views were rejected. Thus, he returned to Switzerland, where he became an economics professor at the University of St. Gallen in 1970, holding the post until his retirement in 1990. After the Velvet Revolution, Šik became an economic advisor to the Czech president, but had no impact on actual economic policies. He became a Swiss citizen and lived there until his death.

== Major works ==
Šik was known as a market socialist but through the time he became a proponent of social market economy instead of market socialism. His major works include:

- The Third Way: Marxist-Leninist Theory & Modern Industrial Society (1972)
- For a Humane Economic Democracy (1979)
- The Communist Power System (1981)
- Economic Systems (1989)
