= Technological evolution =

Theory describing technology development

The term "technological evolution" captures explanations of technological change that draw on mechanisms from evolutionary biology.

== Combinatoric theory of technological change ==
The combinatoric theory of technological change states that every technology always consists of simpler technologies, and a new technology is made of already existing technologies. One notion of this theory is that this interaction of technologies creates a network. All the technologies which interact to form a new technology can be thought of as complements, such as a screwdriver and a screw which by their interaction create the process of screwing a screw.

A described mechanism of technological change has been termed, “combinatorial evolution”. Others have called it, “technological recursion”.

Brian Arthur has elaborated how the theory is related to the mechanism of genetic recombination from evolutionary biology and in which aspects it differs.

== History of technological evolution ==
Technological evolution is a theory of radical transformation of society through technological development. This theory originated with Czech philosopher Radovan Richta.

== See also ==
- Self-replicating machines in fiction
- Sociocultural evolution
