= List of chairmen of the Chamber of the People (Czechoslovakia) =

Chairmen of the Chamber of the People

Below is a list of office-holders:

Name	term
Josef Smrkovský	1969
Sona Pennigerová	1969 – 1971
Václav David	1971 – 1976; 1976 –1981; 1981 –1986
Vladimír Vedra	1986 – 1989
Josef Bartončík	1989 – 1990
Rudolf Battěk	1990 – 1992
Václav Benda	1992
