= Radovan Richta =

Czech philosopher (1924–1983)

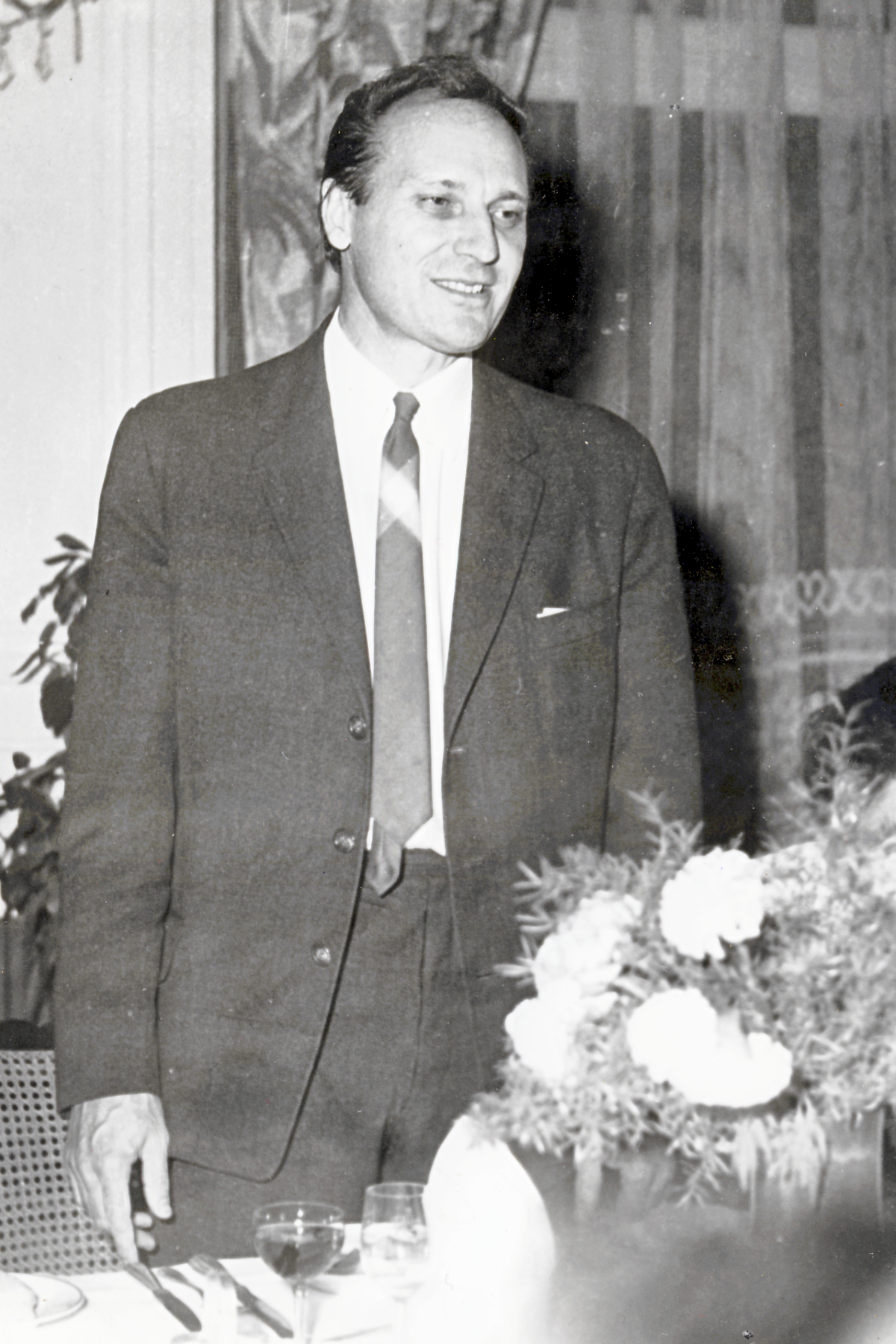
Radovan Richta

Radovan Richta (6 June 1924 – 21 July 1983) was a Czech philosopher who coined the term technological evolution; a theory about how societies diminish physical labour by increasing mental labour.

Richta's first work was Člověk a technika v revoluci našich dnů ("Man and Technology in the Revolution of Our Day"), published in 1963. This work did much to bring the concept of technology into the forefront of philosophical thought during the 1960s. Richta then went on to publish Civilizace na rozcestí ("Civilization at the Crossroads") in 1966. "Crossroads" was a compilation work published by 60 authors (including and led by Richta) that "attempt[ed] to analyze the social and human implications of the scientific and technological revolution". The concepts touched on in "Crossroads" are considered by some philosophical historians to be very ground-breaking for their time.

Richta developed the famous term of "Socialism with a human face" serving as a motto of the Prague Spring period. He became the director of the Institute for Philosophy and Sociology of the Czechoslovak Academy of Sciences in 1969–1982.

== Life ==
Richta was born in Prague. During World War II, Richta organized a resistance movement against the Nazis, and his organization became part of the communist resistance in the critical moment of the worst persecution (or man-hunting). Richta was arrested and held prisoner for several months. He was saved by the Swiss Red Cross when they collected prisoners with the worst cases of tuberculosis and extracted them to Switzerland. Shortly after the rescue Richta's former fellow prisoners were executed on 2 May 1945. (Note: The translation is vague – the author could have meant the prisoners were killed without sentence.)

After the war Richta became quite ill, and beginning in 1958 he periodically spent time in sanatoria. In between bouts of sickness, and in a compromise with his doctors who prescribed complete bed rest, Richta studied and worked very hard.

In the 1960s Richta took on the role of the leader of an interdisciplinary research team. In 1963 they released their first works - Člověk a technika v revoluci našich dnů ("Man and technology in the revolution of our days") and Komunismus a proměny lidského života (K povaze humanismu naší doby) ("Communism and changes of human life. To the nature of humanism of our time").

== Selected works ==
1. (1963) Člověk a technika v revoluci našich dnů ("Man and technology in the revolution of our days"); Published by Czechoslovak society "for the dissemination of political and scientific knowledge" in Prague.
2. (1963) Komunismus a proměny lidského života (K povaze humanismu naší doby) ("Communism and changes of human life. To the nature of humanism of our time"); Part 1 of Richta's PhD dissertation, published by Czechoslovak society "for the dissemination of political and scientific knowledge". (Note: The word 'science' in Czech is used to mean any of the traditional sciences such as mathematics or biology, as well as humanities like philosophy, linguistics or, history, or to mean all sciences and humanities together - i.e. to describe an effort to learn what is unknown.)
3. (1969) Civilizace na rozcestí - společenské a lidské souvislosti vědecko-technické revoluce ("Civilization at the crossroads - the social and human context of scientific-technical revolution") (Collective work). Published by Liberty in Prague, 1st edition 1966, 2nd edition 1967, 3rd edition 1969.
4. (1971) Vědecko-technická revoluce a socialismus ("Scientific-technological revolution and socialism"); (R. Richta - J. Filipec).
5. (1974) Člověk - věda - technika. K marxisticko - leninské analýze VTR Kolektivní práce pod vedením B. M. Kedrova, R. Richty, S. P. Odujeva ("Man-science-technology. The Marxist-Leninist analysis of STR"; Collective work under leadership of Kedrov, Richta, Odujev." STR = Scientific-technological revolution)
6. (1967) Vědecko-technická revoluce a marxismus ("Scientific-technological revolution and marxism"); Published in monthly issues of peace and socialism - 1.
7. Ekonomika jako civilizační dimenze ("Economy as a dimension of civilization"); Contribution for the Proceedings of the Institute of Economic Sciences (K. Kouba). Resource No. 42 team in an interdisciplinary FU Academy of Sciences.
8. (1968) Vědecko-technická revoluce a alternativy moderní civilizace ("Scientific-technological revolution and the alternatives of modern civilization"); Published in the journal Sociological č.5/1968.
9. (1975) Krize perspektiv buržoazní společnosti ("The crisis of the perspectives of the bourgeois society") Abbreviated as printed in the monthly New Idea No. 1 / 1975.

== See also ==
- History of technology
- Information Revolution
- Sociocultural evolution
