= List of chairmen of the National Assembly of Czechoslovakia =

Chairmen of the National Assembly of Czechoslovakia

== Chairman of the Provisional National Assembly ==
Name	Entered office	Left office
Josef David	1945	1946

== Chairman of the Constituent National Assembly ==
Name	Entered office	Left office
Antonin Zapotocky	June 18, 1946	July 18, 1946
Josef David	July 18, 1946	1948

== Chairmen of the National Assembly ==
Name	Entered office	Left office
Oldrich John	June 10, 1948	October 15, 1953
Zdenek Fierlinger	October 15, 1953	June 23, 1964
Bohuslav Lastovicka	June 23, 1964	April 18, 1968
Josef Smrkovský	April 18, 1968	December 31, 1968
