= List of chairmen of the Chamber of Deputies of Czechoslovakia =

List of speakers of the Chamber of Deputies of Czechoslovakia.

Below is a list of office-holders:

Name	Entered office	Left office
František Tomášek	1920	1925
Jan Malypetr	17 December 1925	29 October 1932
František Staněk	3 November 1932	1935
Bohumír Bradáč	1935	20 October 1935
Jan Malypetr	6 November 1935	1938
