= Alois Indra =

Czechoslovak communist statesman

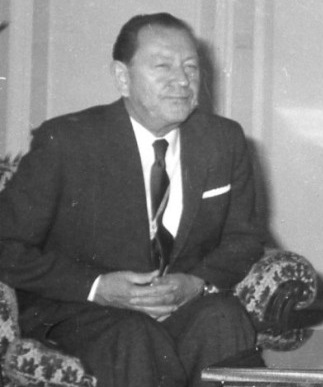
- Alois Indra in 1981

President of the Federal Assembly
- In office 9 December 1971 – 29 November 1989
- Preceded by: Dalibor Hanes
- Succeeded by: Stanislav Kukrál

Personal details
- Born: 17 March 1921 Medzev, Czechoslovakia
- Died: 2 August 1990 (aged 69) Prague, Czechoslovakia

Alois Indra (17 March 1921 – 2 August 1990) was a Czechoslovak communist statesman. He was known for his hardline positions and represented the conservative wing of the Communist Party of Czechoslovakia during the Prague Spring.

== Biography ==
Indra was a railway worker by profession. He joined the Communist Party in 1937. His first place of work after the Second World War was the former Zlín (renamed Gottwaldov), where he first worked as the secretary of the Regional National Committee, after graduating from the Party School of the Central Committee he continued at the local regional secretariat. In 1956, he became the regional secretary of the Communist Party of the Czechoslovakia in Gottwaldov. In 1960, he moved to Prague, where he became head of the planning department of the Central Committee of the KSČ.

From 1963 to 1968 he was a member of the government as Minister of Transport. In April 1968 he was elected as a Member of the Central Committee. Together with Vasiľ Biľak, Indra became one of the most determined opponents of the Prague Spring and was one of those who signed the "invitation letter" calling for Soviet intervention.

During the period of normalization Indra's political influence grew significantly despite Gustáv Husák's efforts to marginalize the ultra conservative pro-Soviet faction of the party. Indra held the position of president of the Federal Assembly. From April 1968 to December 1971, he held the post of a member of the secretariat of the Central Committee of the Communist Party and, at the same time, the secretary of the Central Committee. From February 1971 to November 1989, he was a member of the Presidium of the Central Committee of the Communist Party.

He remained in the federal parliament until December 1989, when he ceased to be an MP as part of the process of co-optation to the Federal Assembly after the Velvet Revolution.

The very first statement issued by the Civic Forum on November 19, 1989, after its creation, contained a demand for the departure of some specific officials, including Alois Indra. He resigned as a member of parliament on November 29, 1989. He was expelled from the Communist Party in February 1990. Indra died in the August of the same year.
