= List of chairmen of the Senate of Czechoslovakia =

Chairmen of the Senate of Czechoslovakia.

Below is a list of office-holders:

| Name | Entered office | Left office |
|---|---|---|
| Cyril Horáček | May 26, 1920 | July 13, 1920 |
| Karel Prášek | July 13, 1920 | February 14, 1924 |
| Václav Donát | February 14, 1924 | February 18, 1926 |
| Václav Klofáč | February 18, 1926 | November 30, 1926 |
| Mořic Hruban | November 30, 1926 | December 12, 1929 |
| František Soukup | December 12, 1929 | March 21, 1939 |
