= Josef Smrkovský =

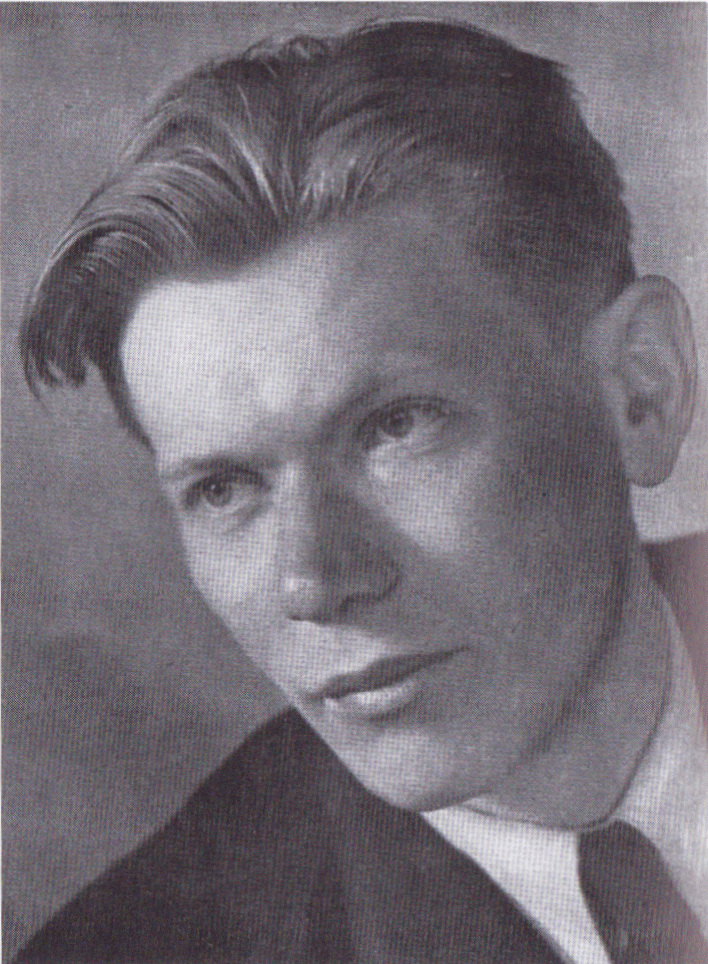
- Josef Smrkovský in 1944
- Born: 26 February 1911; Velenka, Bohemia, Austria-Hungary
- Died: 15 January 1974 (aged 62); Prague, Czechoslovakia
- Occupation: Politician

Josef Smrkovský (26 February 1911 – 15 January 1974) was a Czech politician and a member of the Communist Party of Czechoslovakia reform wing during the 1968 Prague Spring.

== Early life ==
Josef Smrkovský was born into a farmer's family in Velenka, in the Kingdom of Bohemia (present-day Czech Republic). As an adult, he began working as a baker and soon became a secretary of the Red Trade Union (1930–1932) and was involved in the communist movement. He joined the Communist Party of Czechoslovakia (KSČ) in 1933 and went to study at a political school in the Soviet Union. When he returned, Smrkovský began to work as a secretary of the KSČ regional committee in Brno (1937–1938).

== World War II ==
During World War II, Smrkovský worked for the illegal communist resistance to Nazi occupation and eventually became a member of the central committee. In May 1945, as a member of the Czech National Council, he negotiated an agreement for the Nazi units in Prague to surrender. He is notorious (and often quoted) for preventing the US Army from liberating Prague via Plzeň – a claim he himself made publicly in the 1960s.

== "Victorious February" and political imprisonment ==
Although the Czech National Council was dissolved in 1945 and its members were unpopular with Soviet authorities, Smrkovský was co-opted into the presidium of the Central Committee of the KSČ. He worked as a chairman of the Land Property Fund, and in 1946 was elected as a member of the National Assembly. During the government crisis in February 1948, he served as a commander of the People's Militias and helped support the successful communist coup d'état in February 1948 (which later came to be known as the "Victorious February"). He then found work in the Ministry of Agriculture.

In 1951, Smrkovský was suddenly arrested and condemned to life imprisonment for cooperation with a "conspiring centre" around Rudolf Slánský. He was released in 1955 and fully rehabilitated in 1963.

== Prague Spring ==
After his release from prison, Smrkovský worked as a head of an agricultural cooperative (JZD Pavlovice). In 1963, he was assigned to work in various less important government ministries, finally becoming the Minister of Forestry and Water Works.

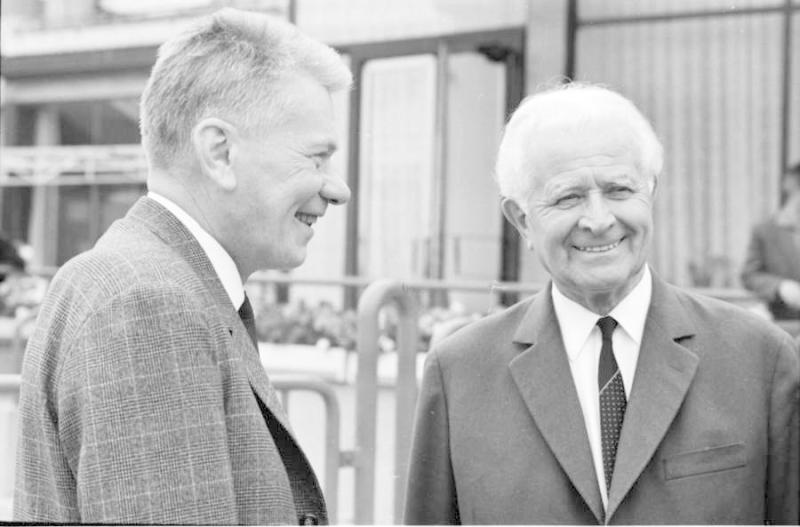
Josef Smrkovský and Ludvík Svoboda in 1968

Smrkovský contributed to the reform movement of 1968 in a peculiar way. Not only did he support the removal of Antonín Novotný from his post as Communist Party leader, but Smrkovský's public announcement ("What Lies Ahead") at the end of January 1968 demonstrated the real impact of Alexander Dubček's election as First Secretary. Smrkovský was designated as chairman of the National Assembly in April 1968, and as a talented speaker became (together with Dubček) one of the most popular politicians of the era. He was in favour of democratic reforms, but remained a believer in the communist ideology, and continued to support the constitutionally guaranteed leading role of the communist party in the state.

== Soviet occupation ==
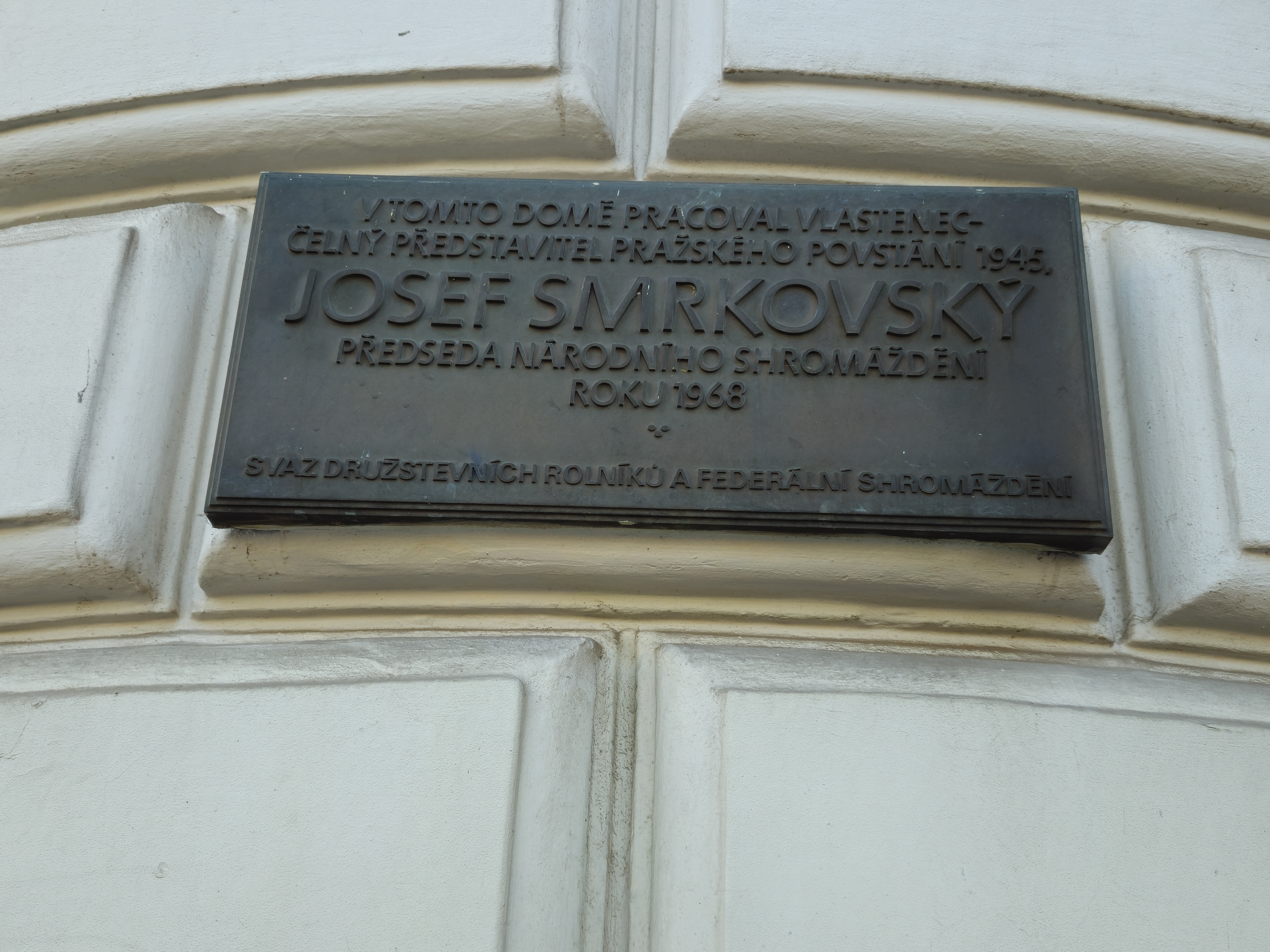
A plaque bearing the name Josef Smrkovský – on the building at Wenceslas Square, No. 52.

"If someone thinks we are manoeuvred by the Soviets, they are badly off base," said Smrkovský in the summer of 1968. His assessment proved incorrect. The Warsaw Pact invasion of Czechoslovakia took only one day. Smrkovský and the other leading proponents of the reform were deported to Moscow, where they were instructed to sign the so-called Moscow Protocol (as they finally did, with the exception of František Kriegel, who refused to sign). Upon his return, Smrkovský unsuccessfully tried to keep the Stalinist wing from taking control of the party. He was demoted at the request of Gustáv Husák, suspended from KSČ, and widely denounced. In 1971 he took part in the birthday celebration of Bohumil Hrabal. He died in 1974, and was buried under police control. The obituary letter sent by Dubček to Smrkovský's relatives was published in Italian daily Giorni – Vie Nuove and reprinted in Le Monde, or New York Herald Tribune.

The public was not supposed to officially learn about Smrkovský's death. František Kriegel's funeral speech was forbidden, but 1,500 people came to honor the memory. The urn with the remains was subsequently stolen and found on a train in České Velenice. The survivors were not allowed to bury the urn in Prague. This did not happen until 1990, when the remains of Josef Smrkovský were buried at the Olšany Cemetery in Prague.
