= July 1968 =

Month of 1968

<<	July 1968					>>
Su	Mo	Tu	We	Th	Fr	Sa
	1	2	3	4	5	6
7	8	9	10	11	12	13
14	15	16	17	18	19	20
21	22	23	24	25	26	27
28	29	30	31

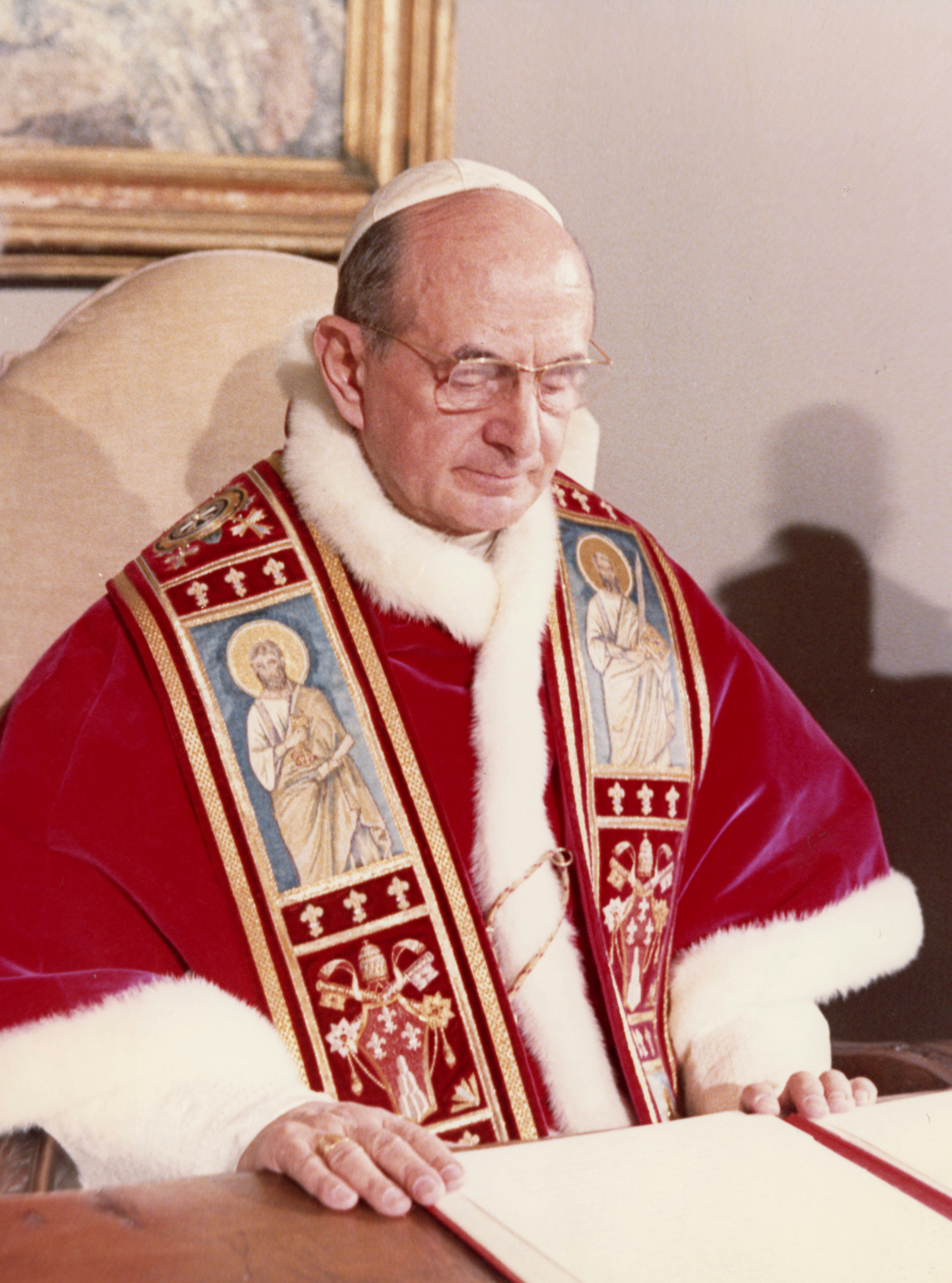
July 29, 1968: Catholic Pope Paul VI issues decision on contraception

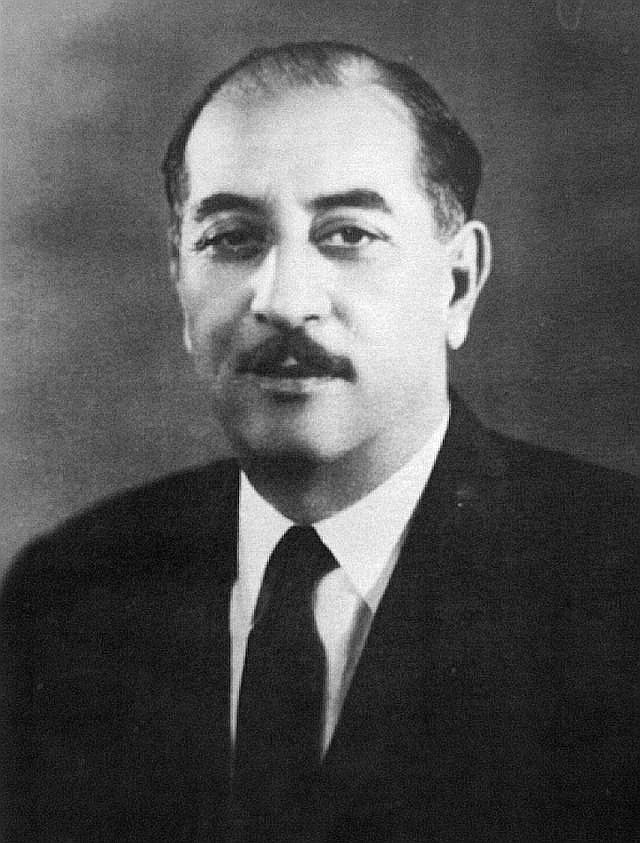
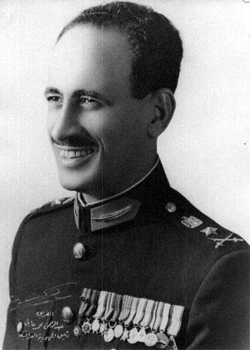
July 17, 1968: Al-Bakr overthrows President Aref in Iraq

July 20, 1968: First Special Olympics Games held

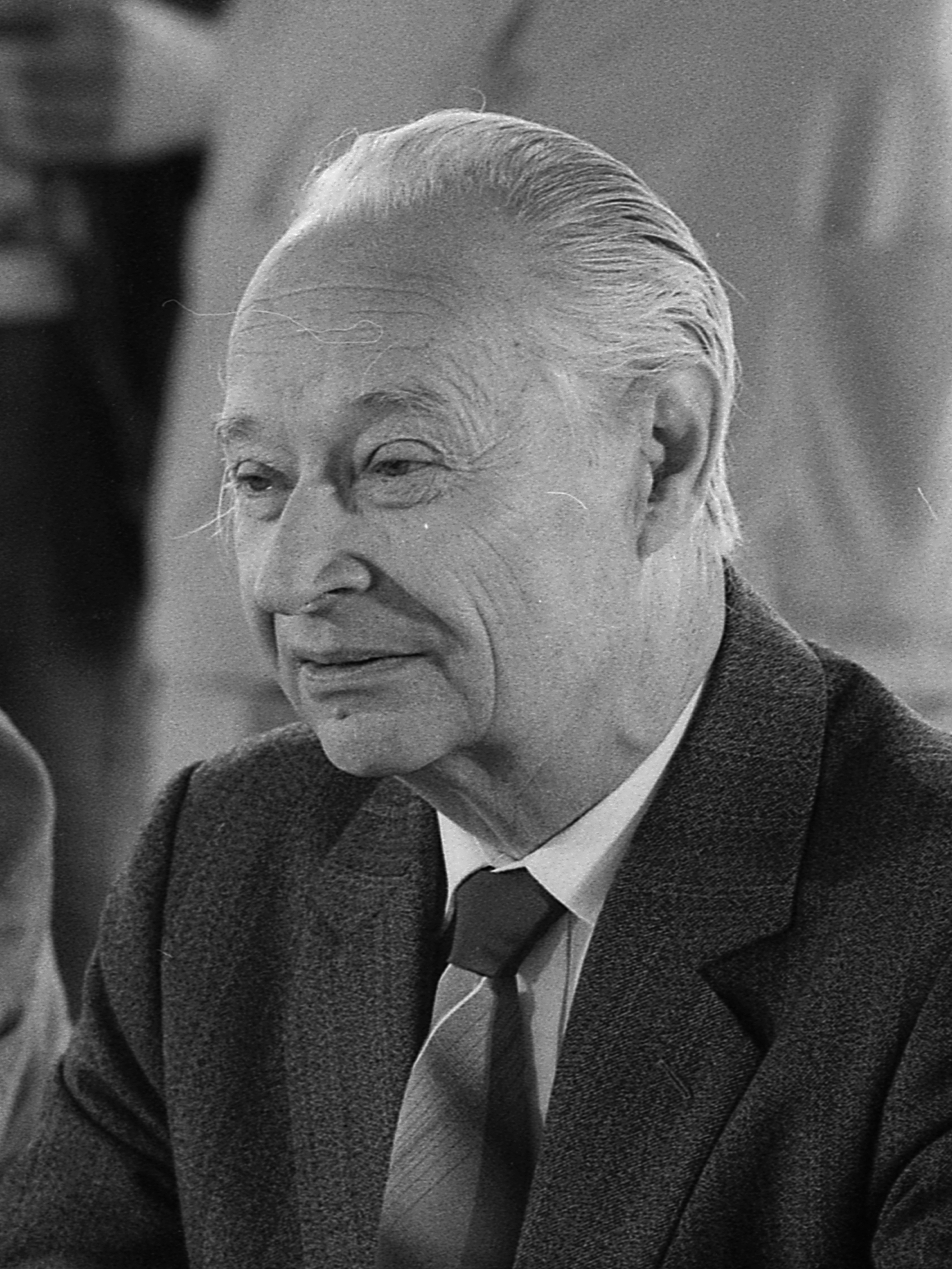
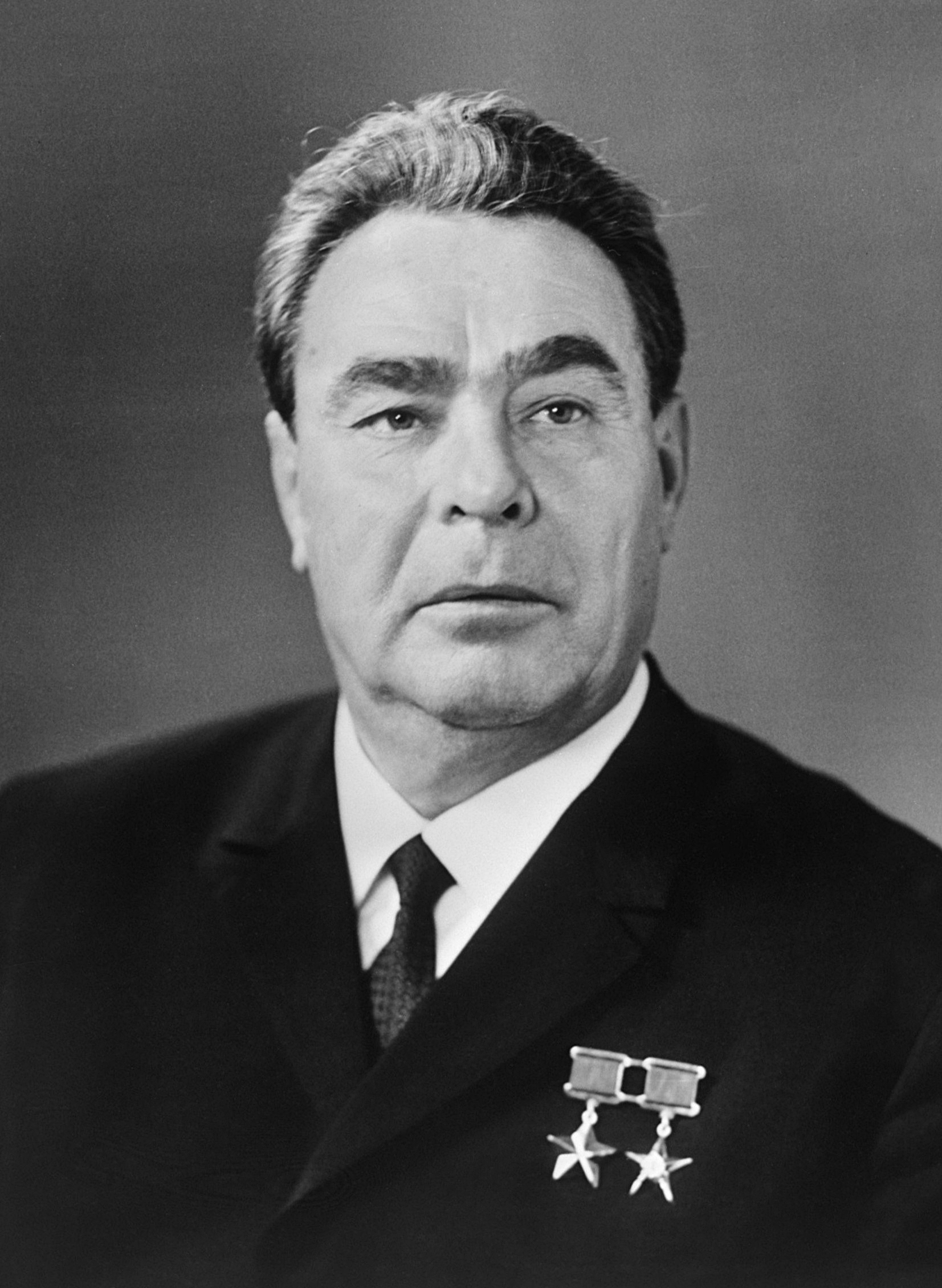
July 29, 1968: Czechoslovakia's Dubček confronts USSR's Brezhnev

The following events occurred in July 1968:

== July 1, 1968 (Monday) ==
- An American airplane and its crew of 214 U.S. Army soldiers was forced to land at an airfield in the Soviet Union after being intercepted in Soviet airspace by two MiG-17 jet fighters. Seaboard World Airlines Flight 253A, a Douglas DC-8 chartered by the Army had been en route to South Vietnam when it was ordered to land, and was escorted to an airfield at Burevestnik in the Kurile Islands. The Americans would be detained for two days. After the United States apologized to the Soviet Union for allowing its aircraft to stray into Soviet airspace, the American DC-8 was allowed to leave on July 3 and arrived at the Yokota Air Base in Japan four hours later.
- Northwest Orient Airlines Flight 714 was hijacked to Cuba by a passenger as it approached Miami after taking off from Chicago. The Boeing 727 carried 92 people, including the gunman, who ordered the pilot to fly to Havana. Cuban officials refused to allow the Boeing 727 to take off from the Havana Airport because of concerns that the 10,500 feet (3,200 m) runway was not long enough for a fully loaded 727 to depart, so the passengers and crew were taken by bus the next day to Varadero, where they boarded a Douglas DC-7 operated by an American "refugee airlift service".
- The Phoenix Program, a U.S. initiative intended to identify and "neutralize" the infrastructure of the National Liberation Front of South Vietnam (the "Viet Cong"), was launched by the American CIA.
- Japan's new postal code system was launched at Tokyo's Central Post Office. Initially, the code consisted of five digits; starting in 1998, it became a seven-digit code.
- The Treaty on the Non-Proliferation of Nuclear Weapons was signed in Washington, Moscow and London and opened for signature by the other nations of the world.
- In the United States, the Chicago Great Western Railway was merged with the Chicago and North Western Railway.

== July 2, 1968 (Tuesday) ==
- Frank Milton, the Chief Metropolitan Magistrate of London's Bow Street Magistrates' Court, ordered that accused American assassin James Earl Ray be extradited back to the United States to face charges for the murder of Dr. Martin Luther King Jr.. Extradition had been sought both by the state of Tennessee, for King's April 4 murder, and by Missouri for Ray's escape from prison in 1967. Milton told Ray directly that the ruling would not take effect until July 17 and that Ray had a right to apply for a writ of habeas corpus.
- The 18th Berlin International Film Festival ended. The Golden Bear prize was awarded to the Swedish film Ole dole doff?, directed by Jan Troell.
- Born: Ron Goldman, American murder victim, restaurant waiter and friend of actress Nicole Brown Simpson; in Chicago, Illinois (murdered by alleged killer O. J. Simpson, 1994)
- Died:
  - Cardinal Francis Brennan, 74, Roman Catholic cardinal and Dean of the Roman Rota. An obituary would note that he "rose from a coal town in Pennsylvania to the highest post ever held by an American in the Vatican."
  - Sir Hans Heysen, 90, German-born Australian painter

== July 3, 1968 (Wednesday) ==
- At the direction of CCP Chairman Mao Zedong, the Chinese Communist Party (CCP) Central Committee issued the "July 3 Public Notice", described as "an important turning point of the Cultural Revolution" and "the first clear indication that Mao and the central leadership had finally decided to put an end to nationwide violence and chaos." The order came in the wake of the massacre of thousands of rebels in the Guangxi Zhuang Autonomous Region by the armies of the Guangxi political commissar, General Wei Guoqing; one historian estimated that as many as 80,000 people were killed in Guangxi during the period before and after the July 3 notice.
- At the end of a two day, closed-door meeting of the Soviet Communist Party Politburo regarding the crisis of the Prague Spring in Czechoslovakia, Soviet Foreign Minister Andrei Gromyko told the 11 full members that "It is now quite clear that we cannot avoid an armed intervention."
- Six people and eight racehorses were killed in a cargo plane crash at London Heathrow Airport. The chartered BKS Air Transport plane, an Airspeed Ambassador, was arriving from France where it was transporting the group from William Hill's farm in Deauville, when metal fatigue caused it to lose control while landing. The plane struck two empty BEA airliners after touching down.

== July 4, 1968 (Thursday) ==
- British yachtsman Alec Rose completed his solo trip around the world after 354 days, as his ketch, Lively Lady, sailed into Portsmouth harbour and was welcomed by 200,000 cheering spectators after an escort by a flotilla of 300 boats. Rose, a 59-year-old vegetable dealer, had spent 320 of his 354 days alone at sea, "longer than any man known in history." Rose had set off from Portsmouth on July 16, 1967, gotten repairs to his vessel from the people of Bluff, New Zealand during February, and rounded the dangerous waters off Cape Horn on April 2 before returning to Portsmouth almost a year after he had left.
- Died:
  - Hermann-Bernhard Ramcke, 79, Nazi General, commander of paratroopers during World War II, convicted war criminal, and right-wing advocate after the war.
  - Gustaf Larson, 80, Swedish automotive engineer and the co-founder of Volvo

== July 5, 1968 (Friday) ==
- Two members of a USO-sponsored pop music band were killed, and two others wounded, when they were ambushed while being transported to perform a concert for a group of U.S. Army members at the coastal resort of Vung Tau. Phil Pill, 19, was a keyboard player and Curt Willis, 17, a drummer, for the group "Brandi Perry and the Bubble Machine". Wounded were 20-year-old Paula Levine, who had auditioned after concluding that "she could make a bigger mark as a pop singer by going to Vietnam than by any other route" and Jack Bone, 18, played bass.
- Rod Laver beat fellow Australian Tony Roche in three straight sets (6–3, 6–4, 6–2) to win the Wimbledon Men's Singles tennis competition. Laver collected £2000 in prize money (roughly $4,800), compared to the £750 awarded to the women's singles champion.
- Alec Rose was knighted by Queen Elizabeth II of the United Kingdom in recognition of his achievement in sailing around the world single-handed.

== July 6, 1968 (Saturday) ==
- The FBI sent a memorandum to its field offices outlining 11 approved COINTELPRO (COunter INTELligence PROgram) practices for disrupting American anti-government organizations collectively described as the "New Left". The ideas ranged from sending anonymous information and misinformation to the local press and the families of organization leaders, to instigating personal conflicts among group leaders, to more extreme measures such as to "create the impression that leaders are 'informants for the Bureau or other law enforcement agencies" and to "have members arrested on marijuana charges."
- Billie Jean King of the United States defeated Australian Judy Tegart 9–7, 7–5, to win the Wimbledon Ladies' Singles tennis competition. She became the first tennis player (since Maureen Connolly in 1954) to win three singles crowns in a row.
- Born: John Dickerson, American journalist and a reporter for CBS News; in Washington, D.C.

== July 7, 1968 (Sunday) ==
- The Communist Party USA nominated a presidential candidate for the first time since Earl Browder ran in 1940, choosing 38-year-old Charlene Mitchell as the first African-American woman to run for President of the United States, concluding its four day convention at the Diplomat Hotel in Harlem. Her running mate, Michael Zagarell was a 23-year-old white man from Brooklyn, younger than the constitutionally required age of 35. The Mitchell and Zagarell ticket, on the ballot only in New York, would receive only 1,077 of the 73,199,999 votes cast in the election in November.
- Elections were held for Japan's House of Councillors, the upper house of the Diet, Japan's parliament. As in the lower house, the Liberal Democratic Party won a plurality of the vote, sufficient for 137 of the 250 seats. The Japan Socialist Party was in second place, with 65 seats.
- A crash killed 26 people, and seriously injured 11 others near the town of Natagaima in Colombia, when the bus they were riding struck a bridge abutment and then plunged over a cliff. The bus was on the way from Neiva to Bogotá.
- The Yardbirds played their final concert, as the British R&B group finished its run at the Luton College of Technology in Bedfordshire.
- Died: Edgar Monsanto Queeny, 70, American business executive, chemist and conservationist who built the Monsanto Corporation from a small manufacturer of pesticides into the fifth largest chemical company in the world.

== July 8, 1968 (Monday) ==
- A powerful solar flare knocked out short wave radio communications on all sunlit portions of the earth, starting at 1803 UTC. The flare was the result of a powerful explosion on the surface of the Sun almost 8 1/2 minutes earlier, four days after the Earth had reached its aphelion (94,511,923 miles, its furthest distance from the Sun) on July 4.
- Thirty-one Egyptian civilians were killed and 58 wounded when artillery shells landed in the El Arbaeen section of the city of Suez during a battle between Israeli and Egyptian forces on opposite sides of the Suez Canal. Israel said that the battle began after Israel Defense Forces at Port Tewfik were struck by Egyptian artillery.
- With reconnaissance photographs as evidence, the CIA reported to U.S. President Lyndon Johnson that, with American bombing of North Vietnam having been suspended, Haiphong, North Vietnam's largest port, was receiving military cargo from the Soviet Union and from Communist China at unprecedented levels.
- The U.S. Navy's last flight of the P-5 Marlin flying boat began when an unidentified pilot lifted off from San Diego Bay to fly the aircraft to the Smithsonian Institution.
- Born:
  - Michael Weatherly, American TV actor known for NCIS and for Bull; in New York City
  - Billy Crudup, American stage and film actor; in Manhasset, New York

== July 9, 1968 (Tuesday) ==
- The first heart transplant in a Communist nation, and the 25th overall, was performed by a 25-man team of surgeons led by Dr. Karol Siska, at the Slovak Institute of Further Education of Physicians and Pharmacists in Bratislava, the capital of the Slovak region of Czechoslovakia. Mrs. Elena Horvathova died five hours after receiving the donor heart. At the time of the surgery, only 7 of the 25 people who had received donor hearts were still alive.
- North Vietnamese Air Force pilot Nguyen Phi Hung claimed to have become an ace by shooting down his fifth enemy plane of the Vietnam War, a U.S. Navy F-8 Crusader (although the U.S. Navy records did not show the loss of an F-8) over the Gulf of Tonkin. His honor was short-lived, however, because before 1st Lieutenant Hung could land, he was killed when his MiG-17 fighter was shot down by a U.S. Navy F8-E.
- The flag of North Vietnam was raised over the Khe Sanh Combat Base by the North Vietnamese Army, 12 days after the United States Marines had abandoned the outpost. During the fighting that continued in South Vietnam's Quang Tri Province in the hills above the base, the Marines killed 89 of the North Vietnamese and lost 13 of their own.
- All 11 people on board a chartered Saudi Arabian Airlines Convair CV-340 were killed when the plane crashed while attempting to land at the Dhahran International Airport during a dust storm.

== July 10, 1968 (Wednesday) ==
- Georges Pompidou resigned from his position as Prime Minister of France after more than six years, apparently after he and President Charles de Gaulle disagreed over de Gaulle's handling of the student and worker strikes of May 1968. After accepting Pompidou's resignation, de Gaulle asked Maurice Couve de Murville to form a new government.
- Gunmen assassinated the governor of the Philippines' Tarlac Province in front of 100 witnesses as he was walking back to his office in Tarlac City. Minutes earlier, Nicolas Feliciano and his pilot, Captain Cenen Tumbaga (who was also killed), had returned to the provincial capital after a flight from Manila.
- In the United Kingdom, the 135-year-old National Provincial Bank and the 134-year-old Westminster Bank completed their merger to become National Westminster Bank, which operates under the trade name NatWest.
- Born: Hassiba Boulmerka, Algerian athlete and gold medalist in the 1500 meter race in the 1992 Summer Olympics and the 1991 and 1995 world championships; in Constantine

== July 11, 1968 (Thursday) ==
- The latest Gallup poll figures were released, showing that voters would prefer Democrat Hubert H. Humphrey over Republican Richard M. Nixon for the U.S. presidency by a 46% to 35% margin, but that if Nelson A. Rockefeller were the Republican nominee, the voters were evenly divided, 36% to 36% (with another 21% preferring independent candidate George C. Wallace. A Gallup survey of a separate group of adults showed that if Eugene McCarthy was the Democratic nominee, he would have a 39% to 36% lead over Nixon and a 37% to 35% lead over Rockefeller.
- The board of trustees of Vassar College, one of the leading higher education institutions for women in the United States, voted to become fully coeducational and to admit its first male students, beginning with the 1969 spring semester. The 107-year-old institution had announced plans in October to establish a separate college for men, but chose instead to have a student exchange program with the all-male Williams College. The decision would be announced on October 1.
- OV1-15, carrying the Solar Perturbation of Atmospheric Density Experimental Satellite (SPADES), and OV1-16, carrying the Low Altitude Density Satellite (LOADS) were launched as the first orbiting satellites to return long-term information on the density of the Earth's upper atmosphere and on weather patterns. "LOADS" returned to Earth on August 19 and "SPADES" returned on November 6.

== July 12, 1968 (Friday) ==
- The attempted hijacking of Delta Air Lines Flight 977 was foiled by members of the crew. U.S. Senator James O. Eastland of Mississippi and hijacker Oran Daniel Richards were among the 48 passengers on the flight from Philadelphia to Houston. Carrying a .45 caliber pistol, Richards forced his way into the cockpit and ordered the pilot, Captain Forrest Dines, to divert the plane to Cuba. The flight engineer, Glenn Smith, calmly talked to Richards and persuaded him to drop the weapon, then continued the conversation until Richards had calmed down. The Convair 880 then made a landing in Miami, where Richards was arrested. The event "was believed to be the first hijacking thwarted in flight". Richards, a former mental patient, would be found incompetent to stand trial and would later be committed to the United States Medical Center for Federal Prisoners in Springfield, Missouri.
- Died: Antonio Pietrangeli, 49, Italian film director, was killed when he fell off a cliff into the Tyrrhenian Sea near Gaeta. Pietrangeli was on location for his final film, Come, quando, perché.

== July 13, 1968 (Saturday) ==
- A worldwide pandemic began when the first diagnosis of influenza A virus subtype H3N2 was recorded in Hong Kong. The subsequent illness, which caused the deaths of an additional 1,000,000 people worldwide and perhaps as many as 4,000,000, was referred to as the "Hong Kong flu" worldwide.
- Gary Player of South Africa won the British Open golf tournament, held at Carnoustie Golf Links in Scotland. With 289 strokes for 72 holes, Player finished two strokes ahead of both Jack Nicklaus of the United States and Bob Charles of New Zealand.
- A Boeing 707 cargo plane of the Belgian airline Sabena hit trees and crashed on approach to Lagos Airport, Nigeria. All seven people on board were killed.
- Martha Vasconcellos, appearing as "Miss Brazil", won the 17th Miss Universe beauty pageant, held in Miami.
- Died: Jess Lapid, 34, Filipino action film star known in the Philippines for film Westerns and detective movies, was shot by two gunmen at the Lanai Nightclub in Manila. Lapid had just completed work on his latest film, The Simmaron Brothers.

== July 14, 1968 (Sunday) ==
- Three Soviet space program engineers were killed during the prelaunch testing of a Proton-K rocket, when a liquid oxygen tank on the fourth stage ruptured and exploded. The lower three stages of the rocket, meant to propel an unmanned Soyuz 7K-L1 spacecraft into lunar orbit as part of the Zond program, remained intact but 7K-L1 #8 was discarded.
- Two spectators were killed, and 27 others injured, at the Berlin Raceway in Marne, Michigan when a race car crashed into the grandstand after its driver lost control. The 18-year-old driver, who was thrown from the car as it rear-ended another racer, sustained only minor injuries.
- The Great Passion Play, which describes itself as "the largest outdoor drama in the United States" (based on total attendance each season), was first performed. Held in Eureka Springs, Arkansas at a 4,100-seat amphitheater at the base of the Christ of the Ozarks statue, and inspired by the Oberammergau Passion Play that has taken place in Germany since 1634, the play is now performed regularly between May and October every year.
- LeeRoy Yarbrough won the 1968 Northern 300 NASCAR motor race, held at Trenton Speedway.
- Died: Ron Rector, 24, American NFL running back for the Atlanta Falcons, died from injuries sustained in a motorcycle accident on June 29.
- Born: Mark Sutcliffe, Canadian politician, Mayor of Ottawa, in Ottawa

== July 15, 1968 (Monday) ==
- The first commercial air service between the United States and the Soviet Union began with the landing of an Aeroflot Ilyushin Il-62 airliner from Moscow at 5:27 in the afternoon at New York's John F. Kennedy International Airport. At 8:23 in the evening, Pan American World Airways Flight 44, a Boeing 707, took off from JFK and arrived 11 hours and 19 minutes later (at 2:42 p.m. local time the next day) at Moscow's Sheremetyevo International Airport.
- The Women's Social Services Law took effect in Iran, directing that all women between the age of 18 and 25, and who had graduated from high school, could be called military service in order for 18 months service in rural areas or poor urban neighborhoods. For women under the age of 30 who had a degree beyond high school, the military service was obligatory.
- The first episode of the American soap opera One Life to Live was introduced on the ABC television network. The show would continue for more than 43 years, until its farewell episode on January 20, 2012.

== July 16, 1968 (Tuesday) ==
- Alexander Dubček and the Presidium of the Czechoslovak Communist Party received a letter signed by the Communist Party leaders of five other Warsaw Pact nations (the Soviet Union, Poland, East Germany, Hungary and Bulgaria) giving a two week deadline for the Czechoslovak leadership to appear at a meeting to justify the democratic reforms that the Czechoslovak Communists had made during the "Prague Spring". The demands included outlawing political groups that opposed Communism, restoring censorship of the Czechoslovak media, and reasserting "the principled basis of Marxism-Leninism, an undeviating observance of the principle of democratic centralism" led by the example of the Soviets.
- Born:
  - Larry Sanger, American Internet project developer and philosopher who co-founded Wikipedia along with Jimmy Wales; in Bellevue, Washington
  - Dhanraj Pillay, Indian field hockey player with 339 appearances for the Indian national team; in Khadki, Maharashtra state
  - Barry Sanders, American NFL football running back and Pro Football Hall of Fame member; in Wichita, Kansas

== July 17, 1968 (Wednesday) ==
- A U.S. Army amphibious boat, and its crew of 11 Americans and one South Vietnamese, was seized by the neutral kingdom of Cambodia and then kept imprisoned for more than five months, after veering into the Cambodian side of the Mekong River that marked its border with South Vietnam. Cambodia's monarch, Prince Norodom Sihanouk, demanded a ransom of 12 bulldozers or tractors for return of the LCU amphibious craft and its men, and refused an American apology. Although treated well during their captivity, the Americans would not be released until December 20.
- National Airlines Flight 1064 from Los Angeles to New Orleans was hijacked shortly after it had stopped at Houston. Just 35 minutes before the DC-8 jet reached New Orleans, a passenger holding a hand grenade took control and diverted the flight to Cuba. At Havana, Cuban authorities transferred the other 56 passengers to a U.S. government chartered propeller-driven DC-7, and they were flown to Miami to catch a flight to their original destination. The crew of the DC-8 flew back to Miami separately.
- Yellow Submarine, a psychedelic animated film that was inspired by a 1966 song of the same name, premiered at the London Pavilion. The Beatles had a cameo appearance, but their animated characters were voiced by other actors (John Clive, Geoffrey Hughes, Peter Batten and Paul Angelis). Most critics enjoyed the animation style, although TIME magazine would later describe the film as "too square for hippies and too hip for squares."
- The 17 July Revolution took place in Iraq as the Ba'ath Party overthrew the government of Abdul Rahman Arif and put the Middle Eastern nation under the control of its Revolutionary Command Council. Arif was arrested and put on an Iraqi Airways flight from Baghdad to Istanbul, where he then proceeded to London. As Chairman of the Council, Ba'athist leader Ahmed Hassan al-Bakr became the new President of Iraq.

== July 18, 1968 (Thursday) ==
- Intel, which would become one of the world's leading computer semiconductor manufacturing companies, was founded by two engineers who had worked at Fairchild Semiconductor, Robert Noyce and Gordon E. Moore in Mountain View, California. They initially called the company and given the name "N M Electronics, Inc.", then soon changed it to "Intelcorporation" before settling on a shorter and more memorable name, Intel, derived from a combination of the words integrated and electronics and suggestive of the word "intelligence".
- Czechoslovakia's Prime Minister Alexander Dubček went on national television and radio and told his people that he and the Communist Party would continue the democratic reforms of the Prague Spring, despite demands from the party chiefs in the Soviet Union and its Warsaw Pact allies to discontinue the reforms.
- At 5:00 in the morning Eastern Time, mail delivery ceased in Canada as Canada Post workers walked out on strike. Canadian businesses, located in cities near the United States border, compensated by renting boxes in U.S. post offices for their deliveries. The strike would finally be resolved after three weeks with an accord reached on August 6.
- In Philadelphia, spokesmen for the Atlantic Richfield Company (ARCO) and the Humble Oil and Refining Company announced the discovery of the Prudhoe Bay Oil Field beneath the Alaska North Slope. The oil field, the largest in North America and one of the largest in the world, had been discovered almost seven months earlier, on December 26, 1967.
- Died: Corneille Heymans, 76, Belgian physiologist and 1938 Nobel Prize laureate

== July 19, 1968 (Friday) ==
- North Vietnam released three American prisoners of war who had been captured in the past seven months. All three— Major James Frederick Low, Captain Joe Victor Carpenter, and Major Fred Thompson — were United States Air Force pilots who had been shot down on December 16, February 15 and March 20 respectively. The three men were accepted by the International Control Commission in Hanoi and flown to Vientiane in Laos.
- James Earl Ray arrived in the United States on a U.S. Air Force C-135 after almost six weeks incarceration in London's Wandsworth Prison. After the C-135 landed in Memphis, Tennessee, FBI agents handed him over to Tennessee law enforcement officials who placed him in an armored car and transported him to a specially constructed cell on the third floor of the Shelby County Jail.
- All 44 crewmen on the burning Philippine freighter SS Magsaysay were rescued by South Korean patrol boats, more than four hours after the ship sent a distress call. The 7,000 ton Magsaysay had been transporting lumber to the South Korean port of Inchon when the cargo caught fire near Daehuksando Island.

== July 20, 1968 (Saturday) ==
- The first Special Olympics games were held, as 1,000 developmentally disabled American and Canadian children, between the ages of 8 and 18, competed during the one-day event at Soldier Field in Chicago. The event, organized by Eunice Kennedy Shriver, would be celebrated 40 years later as "one of the most prominent and celebrated sporting programs in the entire world", with programs that were serving 2,500,000 athletes worldwide by 2008.

== July 21, 1968 (Sunday) ==
- China's Communist Party Chairman Mao Zedong issued a decree creating what would be called "July 21 universities". Inspired by a case study of the Shanghai Machine Tool Factory methods for training its employees, Mao directed expanding the program nationwide. "We still need to have universities," he wrote in his study, published the next day in People's Daily, "but we must shorten the period of schooling, make education reforms, put proletarian politics in command, and take the path of Shanghai Machine Tool Factory to turn factory workers into technicians and engineers." He added that universities "should select their students from workers and peasants. After a few years of study, students should return to their fields of practice." By the time of Mao's death in 1976, there would be 780,000 students enrolled in the July 21 universities.
- All 14 people on board an Aeroflot Antonov An-2 were killed when the aircraft strayed off course and crashed into a 4,000-meter (13,000 ft) high mountain peak near Sufi-Kurgan in the Soviet Union's Kirghiz SSR (now Kyrgyzstan).
- The International Convention on Load Lines, which set uniform safety standards for the waterlines of ships (the mark on a ship to show the limit of how far its hull could go into the ocean), entered into effect.
- American golfer Julius Boros won the 1968 PGA Championship, held at Pecan Valley Golf Club in San Antonio, Texas.
- Jan Janssen of the Netherlands won the 1968 Tour de France.
- Died: Ruth St. Denis, 89, American pioneer of modern dance and co-founder (with Ted Shawn) of the Denishawn school

== July 22, 1968 (Monday) ==
- The Mexican Student Movement of 1968 began after students from two rival high schools fought during a soccer game between Vocational School #2 (affiliated with the Instituto Politécnico Nacional (IPN)) and the Isaac Ochoterena Preparatory School (operated by the National Autonomous University of Mexico (UNAM)). Two neighborhood gangs, "Las Arañas" (The Spiders) and "Los Ciudadelos" (The City Boys) joined in the violence between the vocational and prep schools, and Mexican riot police brutally suppressed the street fight. "Although this street battle seemed benign," an author would later note, "it would trigger a sequence of events that led to a confrontation between youth and government forces." Four days later, two groups of student marchers, both of whom had received governmental permits to march, were suppressed in another attack by police, leading to increasing student dissent met by increasing police response that would reach a climax with the massacre of more than 300 students on October 2.
- El Al Flight 426, from London to Tel Aviv, was hijacked by three members of the Popular Front for the Liberation of Palestine. Thirty minutes after the Boeing 707 had taken off from Rome on its flight to Israel, the commando group forced its way into the cockpit and pistol-whipped the pilot, Captain Obed Arbabanel, and ordered the copilot to fly to Algiers, where it landed at 12:35 local time (2135 Monday UTC) in the early hours of July 23 about 90 minutes after the PFLP had taken control. The act has been described as "the advent... of the modern era of international terrorism". The PFLP terrorists had selected Flight 426 in the mistaken beliefs that Israeli General Ariel Sharon was on board, and that Arbabanel carried a diplomatic pouch that would reveal Israeli state secrets.
- Saturday delivery of mail to American homes would be discontinued after August 31, and mail would be delivered to residences only four days per week beginning in December, in a plan announced to a U.S. Senate committee by United States Postmaster General W. Marvin Watson. Watson, who was responding to a Congressional mandate to reduce the number of postal workers, also testified that 314 smaller post offices had been ordered closed and that another 186 would be eliminated by year's end.
- The Soviet Union withdrew its remaining troops from Czechoslovakia, more than three weeks after the originally scheduled end of the Warsaw Pact military exercises. Two Soviet regiments remained at Cieszyn in Poland, directly across the Olza River from Český Těšín. The Soviet Union also dropped demands that Premier Dubček and the other ten members of the Presidium of Czechoslovakia come to the USSR for a meeting with the Soviet Politburo, and announced that all 11 members of the Soviet Communist Party's Politburo would come to Czechoslovakia, a decision which the New York Times described as "momentous" and one for which "no precedent could be recalled".
- Virginia Slims cigarettes, a tobacco product marketed as the choice of a modern woman, were introduced by the Benson & Hedges company with the slogan "You've come a long way, baby". The product test marketed in San Francisco before being rolled out nationwide.

== July 23, 1968 (Tuesday) ==
- Ten people were killed and 18 others wounded as police in Cleveland and a black nationalist militant group fought a gun battle in the Glenview section on the predominantly black East Side of the Ohio city near the corner of East 105th Street and Superior Avenue. The violence started at 8:30 in the evening at Lakeview and Arbondale Avenues when five men with automatic rifles fired at a police car and a tow truck that had arrived to tow away an abandoned car, followed by sniper fire from apartment houses around the intersection. Fred "Ahmed" Evans, the leader of the Black Power advocacy group "Black Nationalists of New Libya", reportedly told three arresting officers, "If my carbine hadn't jammed, I would have killed you three. I had you in my sights when my rifle jammed." The ten dead were three policemen, three suspects and four bystanders; 10 of the 18 people wounded were policemen. The violence ended after a heavy rainstorm and the intervention of 2,600 Ohio National Guard troops. One of the ten wounded police officers would die from complications of his injuries in March 1993.
- A new labor union, the Alliance for Labor Action, was created as United Auto Workers (UAW) President Walter Reuther and International Brotherhood of Teamsters President Frank Fitzsimmons announced their partnership and their plans to lure away other affiliates of the AFL–CIO. After Reuther's death in 1970 and the depletion of the ALA's treasury during a UAW strike against General Motors, the ALA would disband in 1972.
- Born:
  - Mr. Warburton (stage name for Thomas Edward Warburton), American television cartoon producer and director; known for creating the animated television series Codename: Kids Next Door; in Philadelphia
  - Gary Payton, American NBA basketball point guard and Hall of Fame member; in Oakland, California
- Died:
  - U.S. Air Force Major General Robert F. Worley, 48, deputy commander of the United States Seventh Air Force, was killed by enemy fire in South Vietnam when the reconnaissance plane that he was piloting was shot down. Worley had been directing "the huge armada of Air Force planes bombing North and South Vietnam" and had only 17 days remaining before he was to be reassigned to another country.
  - Henry Hallett Dale, 93, English pharmacologist and physiologist and 1936 Nobel laureate

== July 24, 1968 (Wednesday) ==
- A group of 7,000 members of the Meskhetian Turks minority of the Soviet Union demonstrated outside of the headquarters of the Communist Party of the Georgian SSR in Tbilisi and demanded a meeting with the Soviet republic's leadership to discuss the right to return to the territory from which they had been deported in 1944. Local police brutally dispersed the group, but Party First Secretary Vasil Mzhavanadze would meet with representatives of the Meskhetians two days later and promise to find a way of finding regions of the Georgian SSR that would accept roughly 100 families per year.
- The Holy Order of MANS a monastic-style initiatory religious order, was formally incorporated in California by Earl Blighton, an electrical engineer and social worker who had come to San Francisco to preach "esoteric Christianity" to followers "who had tired of the hippie lifestyle and were searching for a coherent path of mystical enlightenment."
- In Algiers, the Palestinian hijackers holding El Al Flight 426 released the 26 non-Israeli passengers who were on board the plane and allowed them to depart to France. Three days later, 10 women and children were allowed to depart, but the remaining 12 passengers and crew of 10 were held as hostages and would remain captive until September.
- Born: Kristin Chenoweth, American stage, TV and film actress, winner of both a Tony Award (1999) and an Emmy Award (2009); in Broken Arrow, Oklahoma

== July 25, 1968 (Thursday) ==
- The Federal Communications Commission (FCC) of the United States issued a decision expanding the availability of VHF/FM marine radio (for two-way communication between American pleasure boats and marinas) from 18 channels to 39. The frequency range (between 156.0 and 174 megahertz, at a higher frequency than commercial FM radio broadcasting) remained the same, but the 21 additional channels were added primarily by being put in the spaces between those that existed.

== July 26, 1968 (Friday) ==
- The United Kingdom announced its plans for conversion to the metric system by the end of the year 1975, as Minister of Technology Anthony Wedgwood Benn told the House of Commons that the government had accepted the recommendations of the House's Standing Joint Committee on Metrication.
- The United Kingdom's Theatres Act 1968, subtitled "An Act to abolish censorship of the theatre and to amend the law in respect of theatres and theatrical performances", received Royal Assent after approval by both Houses of Parliament.

== July 27, 1968 (Saturday) ==
- By order of China's Communist Party leader Mao Zedong, "worker-peasant thought propaganda teams" were dispatched to Beijing's Tsinghua University to direct the reform of university education. Yao Wenyuan, who was later convicted as one of the "Gang of Four" that had guided China's Cultural Revolution, would proclaim that "Contradictions which have vexed the intellectuals endlessly are quickly solved as soon as the workers participate," and outlined the goal of resolving what he called "the three differences" of the cultures of urban vs. rural, industrial vs. agricultural, and mental work vs. physical work.
- Royal assent was given to the British Standard Time Act after its passage by the House of Commons, providing for a three year experiment in which the United Kingdom would remain on Central European Time (CET) year round (one hour ahead of Greenwich Mean Time or Universal Time). Rather than setting clocks back on the last Sunday in October, the British public would stay on CET.
- Born:
  - Julian McMahon, Australian TV and film actor; in Sydney
  - Jorge Salinas, Mexican TV actor; in Mexico City

== July 28, 1968 (Sunday) ==
- Chinese Communist Party's Chairman Mao Zedong began the process of phasing out the Red Guards and the bringing to an end of the most violent part of the Cultural Revolution, summoning Nie Yuanzi and four other influential Red Guard leaders (Kuai Dafu, Tan Houlan, Han Aijing and Wang Dabin) to his office, and then reprimanded them. "Mao's harsh reproach of the Red Guards at the meeting," an author would later note, "and his decision to send students away from cities afterwards marked the beginning of the end of the Red Guard movement in China."
- Pravda, the official publication of the Communist Party of the Soviet Union, printed an editorial signaling an unofficial Soviet warning to Czechoslovakia. "The Communists and working people of Czechoslovakia have been warned by their class brothers," a party spokesman wrote on the eve of the meeting between the leaders of the two nations, and declared that "Our entire party and people attach great importance to this meeting... time is running out."
- The American Indian Movement, which would become the first militant advocacy group for the interests of more than 800,000 Native Americans in the United States was founded in Minneapolis by Dennis Banks, Clyde Bellecourt and George Mitchell and other members of the Chippewa (Ojibwe) tribe, initially to protest the police brutality against the Native American minority in Minneapolis and St. Paul.
- A United States Air Force C-124C Globemaster II crashed into a mountain while descending into Recife/Guararapes International Airport in Brazil. All 10 people on board were killed. The plane was making its regular weekly flight from Dobbins Air Force Base in Marietta, Georgia, to resupply workers at the United States missile base, codenamed "Wideawake", on Ascension Island in the South Atlantic Ocean.
- England's Court of Appeal upheld a ruling against a judgment of the previous year which had found Hubert Selby, Jr.'s novel Last Exit to Brooklyn to be a violation of the Obscene Publications Act. Writer John Mortimer, QC, appeared for the defence.
- Died:
  - Dr. Charles W. Mayo, 70, American surgeon and diplomat; in an auto accident on his 70th birthday
  - Otto Hahn, 89, German chemist who is the discoverer of nuclear fission, Nobel Prize laureate
  - Ángel Herrera Oria, 81, Spanish Jesuit priest, Roman Catholic Cardinal and Bishop of Malaga

== July 29, 1968 (Monday) ==
- Pope Paul VI issued the papal encyclical Humanae vitae, subtitled On the Regulation of Birth, reaffirming the position of the Roman Catholic Church on birth control, and effectively prohibiting all forms of contraception other than sexual abstinence. German Catholic theologian Bernhard Häring would later write that "No papal teaching document has ever caused such an earthquake in the church as the encyclical Humanae vitae" and another author would note that dissent toward the encyclical "precipitated a crisis of authority of unprecedented proportions within the Catholic Church". Humanae Vitae had been completed four days earlier, on July 25, a date sometimes reported as the date of release. He had signed the encyclical, which would be described as "the careful and prudent reflection of the pontiff upon the report of the papal commission", four days earlier.
- At the village of Čierna nad Tisou, located in southeastern Czechoslovakia near its borders with the Soviet Union's Ukrainian SSR and with Hungary, Czechoslovak Communist leader Alexander Dubček began four days of meetings with Soviet Communist leader Leonid Brezhnev in an effort to avoid a war between the Communist nations of Eastern Europe. The delegations that met at the railway station in Čierna nad Tisou included Prime Minister Oldřich Černík and National Assembly leader Josef Smrkovský to accompany Dubček, and Soviet Premier Alexei Kosygin and Communist Party Second Secretary Mikhail Suslov arriving with Brezhnev.
- The violent eruption of the Arenal Volcano in Costa Rica killed 87 people. At 7:30 in the morning local time, the first explosion took place and sent blocks of stone into the air, many of which fell onto the villages of Tabacón, Pueblo Nuevo and San Luís that were located in the valley below in the Alajuela Province.

== July 30, 1968 (Tuesday) ==
- Just 13 days after leading the Ba'ath Party coup that installed him as President of Iraq, Ahmed Hassan al-Bakr consolidated his power by eliminating his Ba'ath Party rivals who had assisted him, including Prime Minister Abd ar-Razzaq an-Naif, who had been installed on July 17. Saddam Hussein al-Tikriti, a 31-year-old civilian and al-Bakr's chief adviser, led the reorganizational coup and had al-Naif arrested and forced his resignation. Colonel Abd al-Rahman al-Dawud, who had also assisted al-Bakr in the July 17 coup, had been on a diplomatic mission to neighboring Jordan, and agreed not to return to Iraq.
- The Uniform Anatomical Gift Act, the first model law designed to facilitate the process of organ donation in the United States, was adopted by the National Conference of Commissioners on Uniform State Laws. Within a year, 20 of the 50 United States would enact statutes that used the text of the uniform act.
- Thames Television went on the air for the first time, broadcasting to London and the surrounding area of the UK. The company would continue to hold the independent television franchise for this area until 1992.
- The unsuccessful Apple Boutique, a retail store in London that had been created as a business venture by The Beatles, closed its doors not quite eight months after its December 7, 1967, opening, and gave away all of its remaining merchandise.
- A U.S. Air Force Boeing KC-135 Stratotanker on a training exercise crashed when its vertical stabilizer separated from the aircraft over a forest on Mount Lassen, near Red Bluff, California, killing all nine people on board.
- Only three customers showed up for the final run of passenger train service on the Grand Canyon Railway. The company's assets were then acquired as a subsidiary of the Atchison, Topeka and Santa Fe Railway.
- Born:
  - Robert Korzeniowski, Polish athlete and gold medalist in the 50 kilometer walk in three Olympics (1996, 2000 and 2004) and 3 world championships (1997, 2001 and 2003); in Lubaczów
  - Terry Crews, American TV actor and pro football player; in Flint, Michigan
- Died: Jón Leifs, 69, Icelandic composer, pianist, and conductor

== July 31, 1968 (Wednesday) ==
- Brian Howe, a three-year-old boy from Newcastle upon Tyne in England, was murdered by 10-year-old Mary Bell and another girl, Norma Bell. He was last seen by his parents in the street outside his house playing with one of his siblings, the family dog, Mary and Norma. Relatives and neighbours became concerned when Brian went missing. At 11:10 p.m., a search party discovered Brian's body between two large concrete blocks on a railway line known to local children as "Tin Lizzie".
- Cartoonist Charles M. Schulz added an African-American character, "Franklin", to his popular Peanuts comic strip. Schulz made the decision after receiving a letter three months earlier from Mrs. Harriet Glickman, a housewife and mother of three children from Sherman Oaks, California.
- The popular British TV situation comedy Dad's Army, based on life in World War II for members of the Local Defence Volunteers (the Home Guard), was launched on BBC1 as a six-part series. It would prove so successful that it would run for nine years, with 80 episodes.
- Died: Jack Pizzey, 57, Premier of Queensland in Australia, died of a heart attack.
