= June 1968 =

Month of 1968

<<	June 1968					>>
Su	Mo	Tu	We	Th	Fr	Sa
						1
2	3	4	5	6	7	8
9	10	11	12	13	14	15
16	17	18	19	20	21	22
23	24	25	26	27	28	29
30

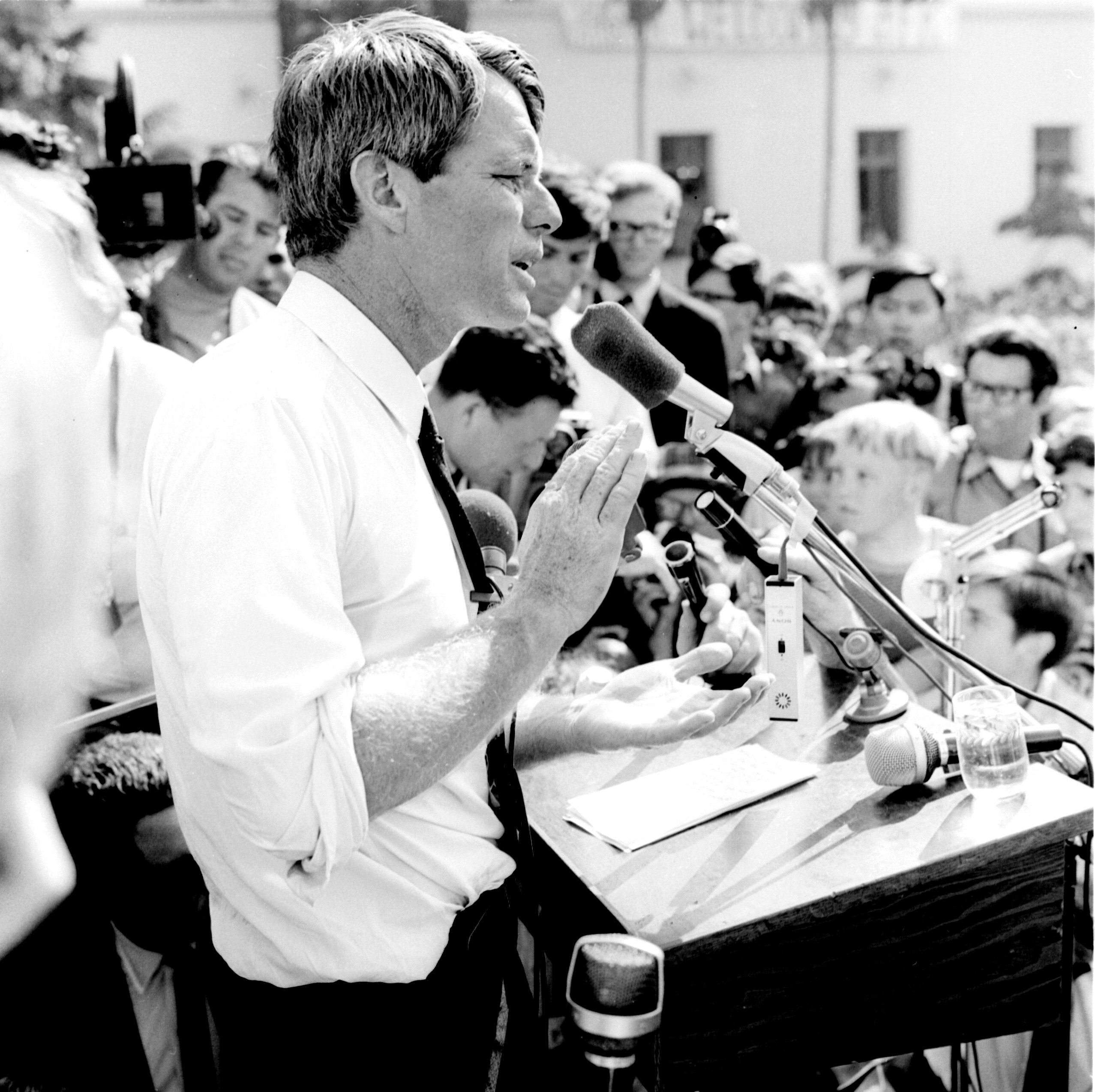
June 5, 1968: U.S. presidential candidate Robert F. Kennedy fatally wounded by assassin following primary victory speech

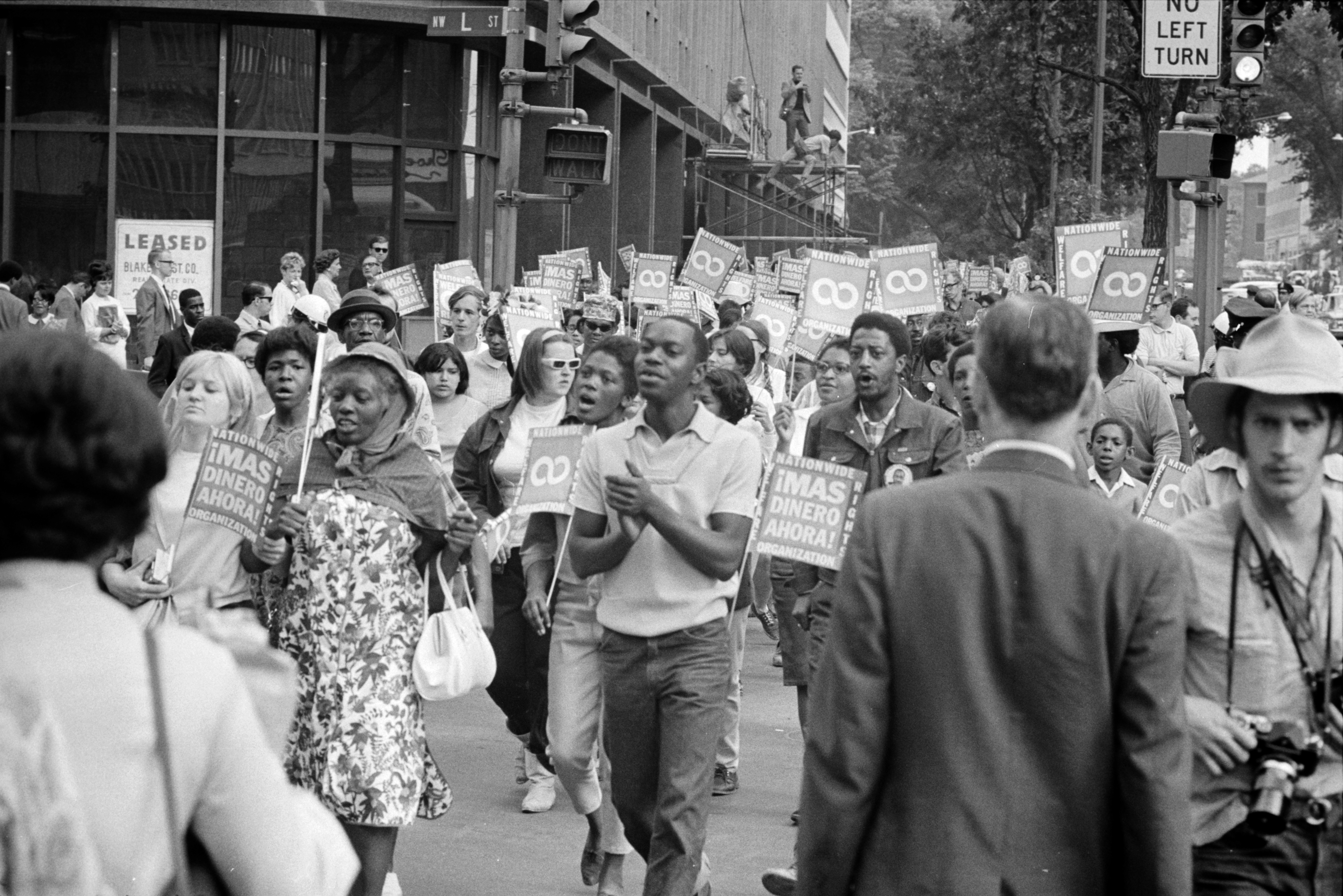
June 19, 1968: Poor People's March begins in Washington, D.C.

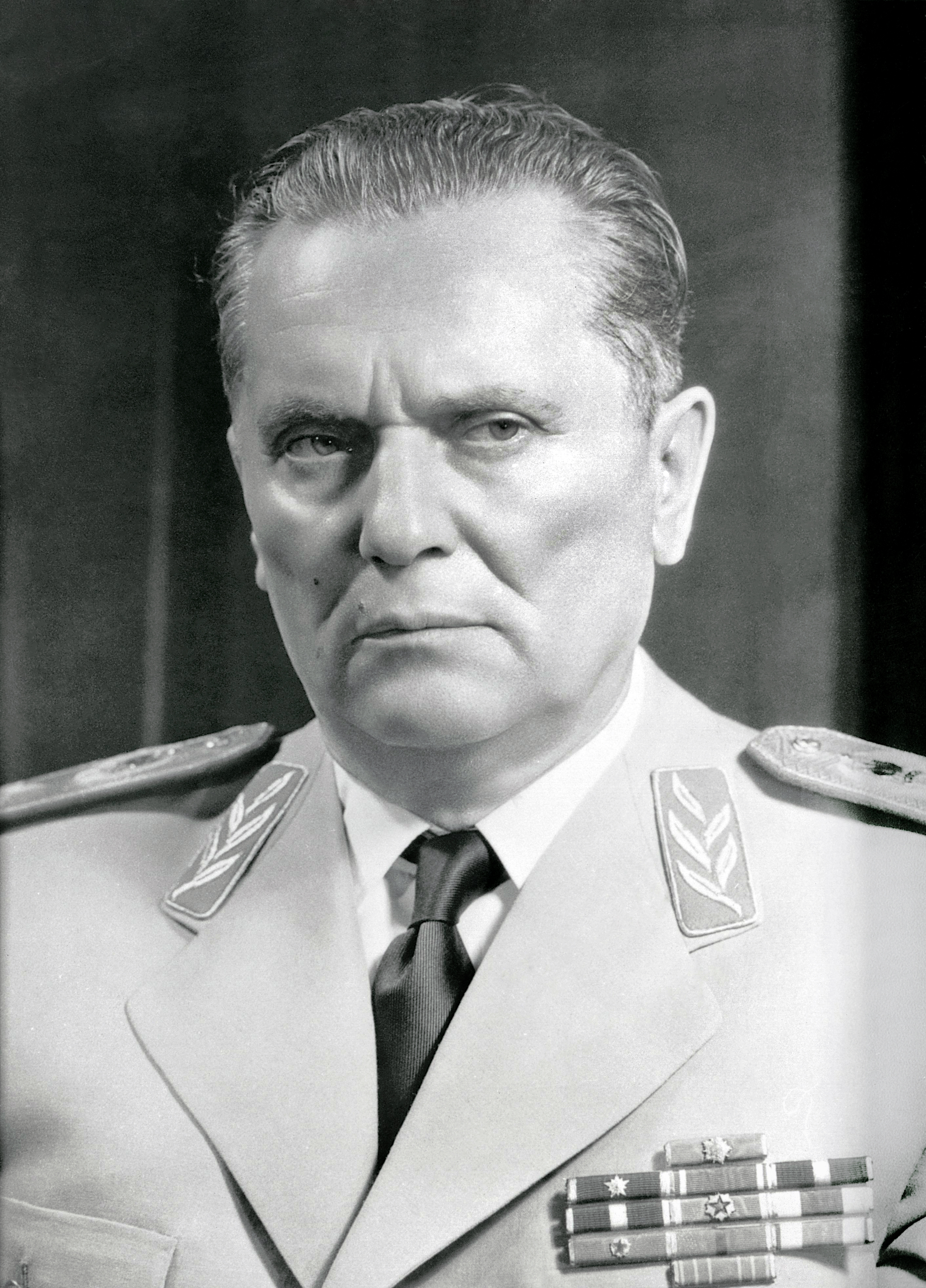
June 9, 1968: Yugoslavia's President Tito settles student revolt

The following events occurred in June 1968:

== June 1, 1968 (Saturday) ==
- The Six Flags AstroWorld theme park opened in Houston, 8 months after its development was announced by Roy Hofheinz. The park would last for 37 years, closing permanently on October 30, 2005, at the end of the season.
- The Sunday Times Golden Globe Race, promoted by London's Sunday Times as a round-the-world yacht race for a £5,000 prize, began with the departure from the Ireland island of Kilronan by John Ridgway on his sloop, English Rose IV.
- Austria became the first Western nation to agree to purchase natural gas from the Soviet Union, signing a long-term lease for an extension of a pipeline from Bratislava in Czechoslovakia.
- Italy's government fell on the 22nd anniversary of the founding of the republic, as the Socialist Party decided not to form another coalition with the Christian Democrats.
- The flag of Alberta was officially adopted by the government of the Canadian province.
- Born: Jason Donovan, Australian actor and singer; in Melbourne

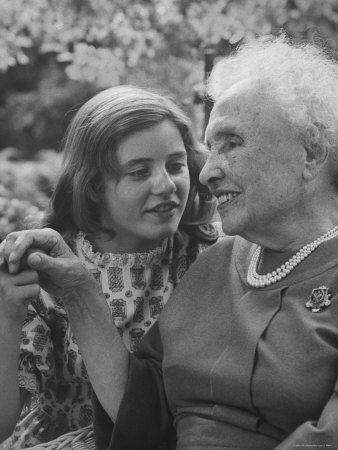
Helen Keller, with Patty Duke

- Died: Helen Keller, 87, American author, political activist, and lecturer, and the first deaf-blind person to earn a bachelor of arts degree; at her estate near Easton, Connecticut.

== June 2, 1968 (Sunday) ==
- A lack of seating at a theatrical performance in Yugoslavia triggered violent student protests in Belgrade. A blackout struck the "Student City" (Studentski grad) dormitories on the day before final examinations were to start at the University of Belgrade, and students went across the street to the adult education center of Novi Beograd to watch a dress rehearsal of a variety show, "Caravan of Friendship". Security guards at the center tried to turn the students away, a scuffle broke out and a 40-man unit of riot police was called to use a water cannon to send the demonstrators back to their dormitories. By midnight, 3,000 students would begin a march toward government buildings in Belgrade and a riot began. A student strike followed with 10,000 students occupying classroom and administration buildings and closing down the university. One week later, Yugoslavia's President Josip Broz Tito would make a surprise response to the demonstrations.
- Leaders of the Basque separatist organization ETA decided to carry out their first assassinations of officials of the government of Spain, targeting Melitón Manzanas, the head of the Brigada Político-Social secret police organization in San Sebastián, and another BPS chief in Bilbao. The attempt on the life of Manzanas would be foiled on June 7.
- The first peace talks to end violence in Cyprus began as Greek Cypriot leader Glafcos Clerides and Turkish Cypriot leader Rauf Denktaş met at a neutral site (Beirut in Lebanon) as guests of the United Nations.
- In the Turkish senate elections, the Justice Party (AP) won 49.9% of the vote. In this election, 53 members of the senate were elected, with 50 members for 1/3 of the senate and 3 empty seats.
- José María Velasco Ibarra was re-elected for a fifth term as President of Ecuador. Velasco Ibarra would assume dictatorial powers in 1970 and would be overthrown in a coup on February 15, 1972.
- Born: Beetlejuice (stage name for Lester Green), American entertainer, comedian and actor; in Browns Mills, New Jersey

== June 3, 1968 (Monday) ==
- Valerie Solanas shot and almost killed pop artist Andy Warhol after following him into his studio, "The Factory", in New York City. With a .32 caliber automatic pistol, she shot Warhol several times while he was talking on the telephone. Warhol underwent 4 1/2 hours of surgery after the bullets tore through his chest, abdomen, spleen and both lungs. Art critic Mario Amaya was slightly wounded; Warhol survived the attack and would recover. Solanas, a self-described radical feminist who had founded the "Society for Cutting Up Men" (SCUM), and told police that she shot Warhol because "he had too much control of my life." Warhol would spend two months recovering in a hospital, and Solanas would serve a three-year sentence at the New York State Prison for Women.
- "The Atheist Point of View", the first regularly scheduled broadcast in the United States to promote atheism went on the air on KTBC, a radio station in Austin, Texas, owned by the family of U.S. President Lyndon Johnson. Madalyn Murray O'Hair, the president of the Society of Separationists, purchased time for a 15-minute program that would run from 10:00 to 10:15 p.m. every Monday. In accordance with the Federal Communications Commission's Fairness Doctrine, KTBC allowed a 15-minute program at 10:15, hosted by Pastor John Barclay of Austin's Central Christian Church.
- Police in Italy recaptured the University of Rome administration building, three days after it had been taken over by students.

== June 4, 1968 (Tuesday) ==
- U.S. Senator Robert F. Kennedy of New York narrowly defeated Senator Eugene McCarthy of Minnesota to win all 172 delegates in California's Democratic presidential primary. The results would not be confirmed until after midnight. As CBS News projected that he would be the winner, the result was described as "a major boost in his nomination race against the man he sees as the real opponent: Vice President Hubert H. Humphrey". President Lyndon B. Johnson joked about the primary in remarks during a state dinner at the White House and said, "We might pick up some tremors later tonight from a disturbance out in California."
- NASA released a new Apollo Applications Program (AAP) launch readiness and delivery schedule. The schedule decreased the number of Saturn flights to 11 Saturn IB flights and one Saturn V flight. It called for three Workshops. One of the Workshops would be launched by a Saturn IB, and another would serve as a backup. The third Workshop would be launched by a Saturn V. The schedule also included one Apollo Telescope Mount (ATM). Launch of the first Workshop would be in November 1970. Lunar missions were no longer planned in the AAP.
- The S&P 500 stock market index, considered by many a bellwether for the U.S. economy, closed above 100 for the first time, at 100.38.
- Born: Al B. Sure! (stage name for Albert Joseph Brown III), American singer, record producer, and former record executive; in Boston, Massachusetts
- Died:
  - Dorothy Gish, 70, American stage and screen actress who, along with her older sister Lillian, were major stars of the silent era of film; from bronchial pneumonia
  - Walter Nash, 86, 27th Prime Minister of New Zealand from 1957 to 1960

== June 5, 1968 (Wednesday) ==
- Moments after thanking supporters for his win in the California primary, Senator Robert F. Kennedy was shot and fatally wounded while walking through a corridor at the Ambassador Hotel in Los Angeles. After the 12:20 a.m. shooting, police arrested Sirhan Sirhan, a citizen of Jordan who had been a U.S. resident for 12 years. Kennedy was rushed to Central Receiving Hospital, where doctors worked on trying to save his life, and then transferred to the Hospital of the Good Samaritan for surgery. A team of six surgeons began operating at 3:12 a.m. after x-rays showed that bullet fragments had penetrated his brain stem, and finished at 6:52 a.m.; Kennedy never regained consciousness. Although Kennedy had been facing Sirhan when the shots were fired, the three bullets that had hit him "traveled back to front", wounding him in the neck, the shoulder and his head.
- Five other people were wounded in addition to Kennedy, and required hospitalization: ABC News reporter William Weisel, union official Paul Schrade, radio reporter Ira Goldstein, and two campaign volunteers, Elizabeth Evans and teenager volunteer Irwin Stroll. Fifty years later, as Sirhan began his 51st year in prison, Schrade and the Senator's son, Robert F. Kennedy, Jr., would both express their belief that Sirhan had not been the gunman.
- CIA test pilot Jack Weeks disappeared while conducting the last test of the Lockheed A-12 supersonic reconnaissance jet during the CIA's "Oxcart" program. The A-12s were already scheduled for retirement when Weeks departed from USAF Kadena Air Base in Japan and, 41 minutes later, the onboard telemetry system signaled that an engine was overheating, followed by a drop of fuel flow and a rapid decrease in altitude. Weeks's last known position had been over the Philippine Sea, 520 miles (840 km) east of Manila. No trace of the wreckage would be located.

== June 6, 1968 (Thursday) ==
- Pakistan announced that it would be the first of the five member signatories to the 1955 Baghdad Pact to withdraw from CENTO, the Central Treaty Organisation. The mutual security pact had been signed by Iraq, Iran, Turkey, Pakistan and the United Kingdom. After the Iranian Revolution of 1979, the other Middle Eastern nations would withdraw as well.
- Secret Service protection was extended to all major U.S. presidential and vice presidential candidates under Public Law 90–331 after President Johnson signed a bill into law hours after it had been passed by both houses of the U.S. Congress.
- Died:
  - Robert F. Kennedy, 42, U.S. Senator for New York since 1965, after being shot the day before by Sirhan Bishara Sirhan. Kennedy was pronounced dead at the Good Samaritan Hospital in Los Angeles, more than 25 hours after he had been shot in the head, and almost seven hours after surgeons had completed emergency surgery to remove bullet fragments from his brain stem. Kennedy never regained consciousness, and was removed from mechanical life support by consent of his family after his doctors had informed them that brain activity had ceased and Reverend Thomas Pecha had administered the last rites. Fifteen minutes after Kennedy's death, his press secretary, Frank Mankiewicz, told reporters, "I have a short announcement to read... Senator Robert Francis Kennedy died at 1:44 a.m. today, June 6, 1968. With Senator Kennedy at the time of his death was his wife Ethel, his sisters, Mrs. Patricia Lawford, and Mrs. Stephen Smith, his brother-in-law, Stephen Smith, and his sister-in-law, Mrs. John F. Kennedy. He was 42 years old."
  - Randolph Churchill, 57, English journalist and politician, son of Sir Winston Churchill; of a heart attack

== June 7, 1968 (Friday) ==
- Txabi Etxebarrieta, selected by the Euskadi ta Askatasuna (ETA) Basque separatist organization, was killed while on his way to carry out ETA's first attempt at a political assassination, the killing of police superintendent Melitón Manzanas. Etxebarrieta and his assistant, Iñaki Sarasketa, were driving in a stolen automobile when their car was pulled over for a random traffic check by a civil guardsmen. The guardsman, Jose Antonio Pardines, became the first of 820 people to be killed by ETA terrorists. Etxebarrieta fled the scene and was stopped at Tolosa, where he was killed in an exchange of gunfire with other guardsmen. Pardines would be imprisoned until 1977; Manzanas would be killed at his home on August 2.
- In the United Kingdom, sewing machinists went on strike at the Ford Dagenham assembly plant, as 187 female workers walked out on strike to demand pay equal to that of men for jobs rated at the same technical grade. "The Women Workers at Fords of Dagenham" made seat covers for car seats in Ford vehicles. The walkout would last three weeks, during which more than 2,000 cars could not be completed, and would end only after the government dispatched Barbara Castle, the Secretary of State for Employment and Productivity. In the long run, the strike would be a catalyst for the passing of the UK's Equal Pay Act 1970.
- The first of 14,000 patients to be diagnosed with Yushō disease entered a hospital in Japan with symptoms of acneiform eruptions caused by chemical poisoning from polychlorinated biphenyls (PCBs) and polychlorinated dibenzofurans (PCDFs). All of them had ingested food that had been cooked in rice bran oil that had been produced by the Kanemi Company and shipped to distributors in February. Eventually, 500 people would die from Yushō disease.
- At the village of Jostoma, located eight miles from Kohima (capital of the Indian state of Nagaland), Chinese-trained Naga rebels fought a battle with members of India's Border Security Force. The government forces suffered 90 casualties but routed the rebels, who had 200 members who were killed or wounded, and captured Chinese-made weapons and documents implicating the People's Republic of China.
- Mrs. Esther Matthews, a 41-year old African-American housewife in Dallas, became the first woman to receive a heart transplant, and the 21st overall. She died on the operating table 90 minutes after the heart had been implanted by a surgical team from the University of Texas Southwestern Medical Center.
- The first Legoland amusement park was opened in Billund, Denmark, where the Lego Group company headquarters was located. As of 2017, there are eight Legoland parks, in seven nations.
- The European Convention on Information on Foreign Law was signed in London and would come into effect on December 17, 1969.
- Died: Dan Duryea, 61, American actor; of cancer

== June 8, 1968 (Saturday) ==
- At 11:15 in the morning local time, James Earl Ray was arrested at Heathrow Airport in London for the assassination of Martin Luther King Jr. Ray was spotted while preparing to board an airplane to fly to Brussels. Scotland Yard officials said that he had been carrying a loaded pistol and two false Canadian passports bearing the name of Ramon Sneyd, after receiving a tip from the Royal Canadian Mounted Police watchlist. During his 65 days on the run, Ray drove from Memphis, Tennessee, to Birmingham, Alabama, and then to Atlanta. He abandoned his car, rode a bus from Atlanta to Detroit, rode in a taxicab to Windsor, Ontario, and got a train to Toronto on April 6. After a month in Toronto, where he got a passport in the name of Sneyd, he flew to London on May 6, then flew to Lisbon where he tried to get a visa to take a ship to Africa. Deciding that he would have a better chance in Belgium, he planned to go to Brussels after changing planes at London.
- NASA launched two Aerobee 150 sounding rockets from White Sands Missile Range, New Mexico. The first rocket carried a Naval Research Laboratory and University of Maryland payload to a 179-kilometre (111 mi) altitude to flight test a design verification unit of the high-resolution spectroheliograph planned for use on the Apollo Telescope Mount (ATM). The second rocket carried an American Science and Engineering, Inc., payload to a 150-kilometre (93 mi) altitude to obtain high-resolution x-ray pictures of active regions of the Sun during solar flare and general x-ray emission of solar corona. The rocket and instrumentation performed satisfactorily, but the payload of the first rocket failed to separate, thus preventing functioning of the parachute recovery system.
- The funeral of Robert F. Kennedy took place in Washington, D.C., two days after his death, after which he was buried in Arlington National Cemetery adjacent to the grave of his brother, John F. Kennedy. The last surviving brother, Edward M. Kennedy, gave the eulogy.
- Italy and Yugoslavia played to a 1–1 draw in the final of the 1968 European Championship soccer football tournament. To resolve the tie, 30 minutes of extra time were played without either team scoring, leading to a second complete game to be played two days later.

== June 9, 1968 (Sunday) ==
- Yugoslavia's President, Josip Broz Tito, appeared on state television and radio to address the student revolt in the University of Belgrade and on other campuses. The Communist leader conceded that the student demonstrations were a response to the nation's flaws and a legitimate protest against unjust policies of local governments. His recognition that the student demands were legitimate, and that the Yugoslav federal government needed to investigate them, brought an end to the revolt. "I think the events which occurred at New Belgrade struck at the heads of many of us," he told the audience, and acknowledged that he and the Communist Party bore some of the blame for the unrest. He added that "I can say that 90% of students are honest youth of whom we did not take sufficient care", and urged students to return to their studies; "This time," he said, "I will wholeheartedly endeavor for solutions, and students must help me in this. If I am not able to settle these issues, then I should not remain in my post."
- U.S. Marine Corps 1st Lt. Walter R. Schmidt, Jr., was shot down over the A Shau Valley of North Vietnam while leading a flight in an aerial attack of supply trucks. He ejected safely and, for more than five years, was listed as an American prisoner-of-war. Then, after he was neither repatriated nor mentioned on the list of POWs who died in captivity at war's end, his parents were told that his status had been changed to "deceased, body not recovered". Declassified documents of the U.S. Department of Defense would indicate their belief that Schmidt was still alive after the war as an abandoned "missing in action" (MIA) prisoner.
- U.S. Coast Guard Lieutenant Jack C. Rittchier became the first member of the Coast Guard to die in enemy action in the Vietnam War. Rittchier's helicopter was shot down while he was trying to rescue a downed Marine Corps pilot. In all, seven Guardsmen (out of 8,000) were killed in the war, and 60 wounded.
- The 1968 Surfers Paradise 4-Hour endurance race for touring cars was held at Surfers Paradise International Raceway in Queensland, Australia, and was won by John French, in an Alfa Romeo GTV.
- The final of the DFB-Pokal football tournament, was played at Südweststadion in Ludwigshafen, Germany, and was won by FC Köln, who defeated VfL Bochum 4–1.
- The Belgian Grand Prix took place at the Circuit de Spa-Francorchamps and was won by Bruce McLaren.
- Born: Aleksandr Konovalov, Russian lawyer, judge of the Constitutional Court of Russia since 2025 and Minister of Justice from 2008 to 2020; in Leningrad, Russian SFSR, Soviet Union

== June 10, 1968 (Monday) ==
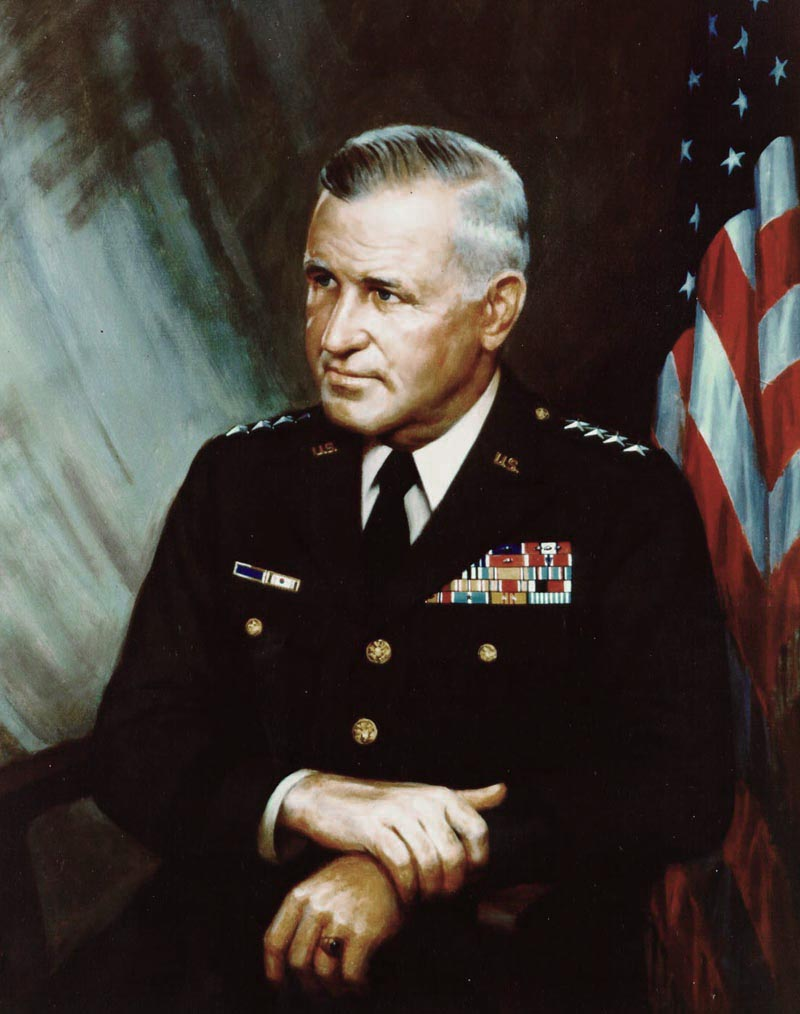
General Abrams

- U.S. Army General Creighton Abrams assumed the command of military operations in the Vietnam War, succeeding General William Westmoreland. During his four years as commander, a biographer would later note, General Abrams "stressed pacification rather than Westmoreland's policy of search and destroy". In carrying out the American policy of "Vietnamization", to gradually withdraw American forces while increasing the strength of South Vietnam's forces, Abrams would oversee a decrease in the number of U.S. troops from 543,000 to 49,000.
- Italy beat Yugoslavia 2–0 in a replay of the final of the 1968 European Championship. Two days earlier, the teams had played to a 1–1 draw that was unresolved after 30 minutes of extra time. Noting that and the 90 minute rematch, The Guardian noted that "It took the Italians 210 minutes of grueling football to overcome the tenacious Yugoslavs" and "won their first major honour since they captured the World Cup in 1938".
- Born:
  - The D.O.C. (stage name for Tracy Curry), American rapper, songwriter, and record producer; in West Dallas, Texas
  - Bill Burr, American stand-up comedian; in Canton, Massachusetts
- Died: Marshall Hodgson, 46, American historian and authority on Islamic studies; while completing the revisions on his six-volume work The Venture of Islam: Conscience and History in a World Civilization.

== June 11, 1968 (Tuesday) ==
- Four inmates of the federal penitentiary in Atlanta (a murderer and three bank robbers) seized control of the administration building and took 25 employees hostage (18 men and 7 women) after failing in an escape attempt. Two of the women and a man were released later. After prison officials agreed to the publication of the inmates' list of nine grievances in the Atlanta Journal, the hostages were released unharmed. Three hours after the inmates surrendered, the FBI announced the arrest of a girlfriend of one of the prisoners and charged her with having smuggled in "two pistols, 50 rounds of ammunition for each gun and four hacksaw blades".
- The progress of the Gun Control Act of 1968 was delayed by a tied vote in the U.S. House Judiciary Committee.
- The 1968 Giro d'Italia cycle race concluded in Naples, with Belgian Eddy Merckx the overall winner.

== June 12, 1968 (Wednesday) ==
- The United Nations General Assembly voted to approve the Treaty on the Non-Proliferation of Nuclear Weapons by a margin of 95 to 4, with 21 members nations abstaining. The General Assembly also approved UNGA Resolution 2372, in favor of changing the status of the UN Territory of South-West Africa (now Namibia) which was administered by the white minority government of South Africa over the UN's continued protest. Though not recognized by South Africa, the new name for South-West Africa was drawn from the Namib Desert that runs across the area's coast; Namibia would become independent in 1990.
- The French government banned all street demonstrations and ordered the dissolution of seven "extremist student groups" (including the "March 22 Movement" founded by Daniel Cohn-Bendit and the "Revolutionary Communist Youth Organization". The restrictions were to remain in place until the end of the June 30 elections for the French National Assembly, and campaign rallies were limited to indoor events.
- Six of the 63 people on board Pan American World Airways Flight 1 were killed when the Boeing 707 crashed short of the runway at the airport in Kolkata (then Calcutta) at the end of its flight from Bangkok. Most of the passengers were Americans, including four of the dead.
- After the withdrawal of Soo Line Railroad's objections, the Interstate Commerce Commission approved the proposed merger of Chicago and North Western Railway with Chicago Great Western Railroad.
- The controversial film Rosemary's Baby, directed by Roman Polanski and starring Mia Farrow, premiered in the United States. The film was an inductee of the 2014 National Film Registry list.
- Paul Vanden Boeynants resigned as Prime Minister of Belgium. Gaston Eyskens formed a new coalition of ministers.

== June 13, 1968 (Thursday) ==
- Earl Warren, the Chief Justice of the United States Supreme Court, met with U.S. President Lyndon Johnson, and announced his intention to retire so that Johnson could appoint a successor. Warren was 77 and, after the assassination of Robert F. Kennedy, believed that it was likely that the Republican Party nominee would win the presidential election. Warren's strategy would fail after Johnson's nomination of Associate Justice Abe Fortas as the next Chief Justice, and Fortas would do poorly in the confirmation hearings before the U.S. Senate Judiciary Committee. By the time of Johnson's withdrawal of the nomination, there would be only one month left until the election; Richard M. Nixon would choose Warren Burger as Earl Warren's successor.
- The first attempt to transplant the heart of a sheep into a human being failed, as Dr. Denton A. Cooley and a team of surgeons at St. Luke's Episcopal Hospital in Houston worked unsuccessfully to keep a patient alive until a human donor could be found. Sam Willoughby, a life insurance agency manager from Waterloo, Iowa, agreed for the implantation of the heart of a 125-pound ram as "a last resort" after being resuscitated from cardiac arrest in the hospital, but died before the operation could be completed. On January 24, 1964, Dr. James Hardy had implanted the heart of a chimpanzee into a patient who had survived for one hour after the operation.
- The U.S. House of Representatives passed the Omnibus Crime Control and Safe Streets Act of 1968 by a 368 to 17 margin, after the U.S. Senate's earlier 72 to 4 approval, but U.S. President Lyndon Johnson was dissatisfied with the compromises on gun control within the legislation and declined to sign it until June 19. House Minority Leader (and future President) Gerald R. Ford said that, rather than hesitate, the President should reject the bill "so we can re-enact it over his veto".
- Czechoslovakia abolished the Central Publication Office that had conducted censorship of all publications since the 1948 coup that had left the nation's Communist Party in control of the government. Two weeks later, on June 26, the Party would confirm the abolition of censorship.
- Uruguay's President, Jorge Pacheco Areco, declared a state of emergency in the South American nation in response to increasing unrest by opposition political parties and anti-government revolutionary groups. The emergency would briefly be lifted on March 15, 1969, but would be reinstated on June 24.
- A tornado killed 13 people and injured 125 others in and around the small town of Tracy, Minnesota. The town elementary school and 110 houses were destroyed when the F5 tornado, with speed of up to 300 miles per hour (480 km/h) hit the town of about 2,800 people at about 7:00 in the evening.
- Died: U.S. Army Lieutenant Colonel Frank A. Barker, 40, was killed in a helicopter crash in South Vietnam. Three months earlier, Barker had ordered a U.S. Army task force to clear the area around My Lai, where the My Lai Massacre of 347 civilians at Song My village had taken place on March 16. "Whether or not Barker directly ordered the deliberate killing of noncombatants," a historian would write later, a U.S. Army Captain under his command would testify before a board of inquiry "that Barker had instructed him to destroy the hamlet known as My Lai". The board would conclude that Barker "was culpable of at least 11 violations of army regulations, some of which were considered war crimes".

== June 14, 1968 (Friday) ==
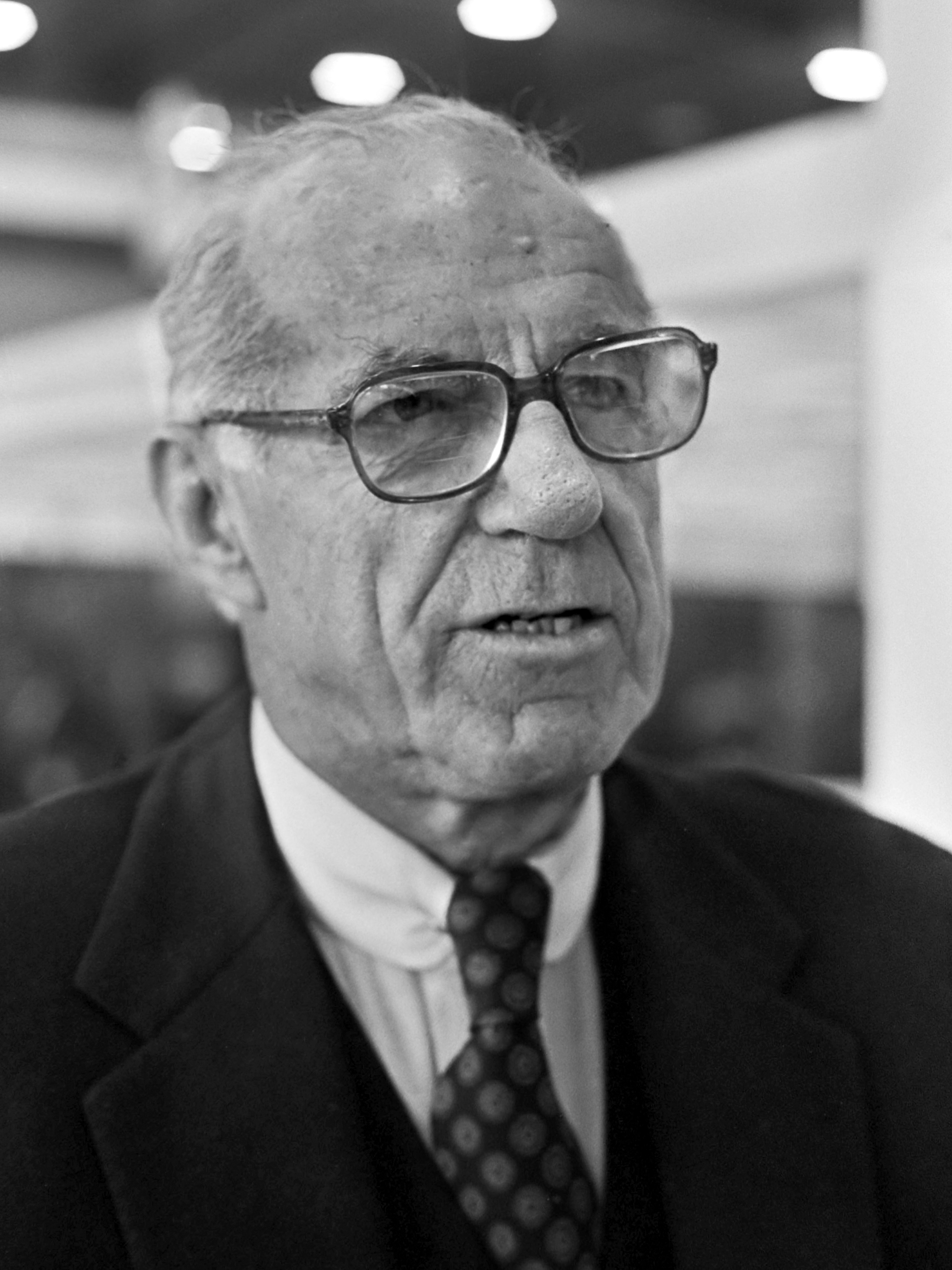
Dr. Spock

- Dr. Benjamin Spock, a pediatrician famous to two generations for the child-raising guide The Common Sense Book of Baby and Child Care, was convicted by a 12-man federal jury in Boston for conspiracy to disrupt the selective service process, along with three of his four co-defendants. Dr. Spock, Yale chaplain William Sloane Coffin, Jr., teacher Mitchell Goodman and graduate student Michael Ferber were sentenced to two years in prison for aiding young American men in avoiding being drafted into military service during the Vietnam War, but the sentences were suspended pending an appeal. The convictions would later be set aside on appeal. The other member of the "Boston Five", Marcus Raskin, was acquitted.
- At 2148 UTC, the asteroid Icarus made its closest approach to Earth since 1949, but astronomers had already debunked rumors (that had abounded for the past three years) that the half-mile wide object would collide with the planet. Earlier, Dr. Brian G. Marsden of the Smithsonian Astrophysical Observatory told reporters that the "miss distance" was estimated to be roughly 3,951,000 miles (6,359,000 km), give or take "a few hundred miles", a distance that made Icarus 16 times further away than the Moon, and that Icarus would still be "600 times fainter than the naked eye can see". The approach of Icarus had inspired the first group study of what is now called "asteroid impact avoidance", in an undergraduate class at the Massachusetts Institute of Technology, "Advanced Space Systems Engineering", in the spring 1967 semester. Students were asked to assume that Icarus would actually strike the Earth within 70 weeks and assigned to study whether it could be deflected. Their conclusion was that the only solution was for 100-megaton thermonuclear weapons to be detonated on the surface at various times, with the first 73 days before impact (April 16, 1968) and the last chance only five days before impact, with the goal of either fragmenting or deflecting Icarus. An author would write in 2016, "most of what they concluded would still be valid today".
- Josef Windeck and Bernard Bonitz, both former prisoners of the Auschwitz concentration camp, were sentenced to life imprisonment by a court in Frankfurt, West Germany, after being convicted of murdering their fellow inmates. Neither was Jewish, but both had been professional criminals who had been deported as "undesirables" to Auschwitz from prison and then given free rein to terrorize the camp population in the capacity of a "Kapo", a "Kameradschaftpolizei" ("comrade policeman") accorded special treatment in return for assisting the guards. Windeck had been charged with 117 murders and convicted of five. Boenitz had been charged with 72 and convicted of one. Windeck would be released after a year for health reasons and survive until 1977.
- The student occupation of the Odeon Theatre in Paris ended after a month, as police expelled 208 young men and women who had taken over the national theater on May 14. The expulsion came peaceably as 132 people voluntarily left on the promise that they would not be arrested. The other 76 were brought out forcibly but then released as soon as they got outside.
- Died: Salvatore Quasimodo, 66, Italian poet and 1964 Nobel Prize in Literature laureate; of a cerebral hemorrhage

== June 15, 1968 (Saturday) ==
- Former French Army General Raoul Salan and 10 other officers of the Organisation armée secrète (OAS) were released from prison after being pardoned by the man whose overthrow and assassination they had plotted, President Charles de Gaulle. Formerly a national hero and France's most-decorated military officer, Salan had led a revolt against his government in 1961 in an attempt to keep French Algeria from being granted independence. He had been convicted of treason and sentenced to life imprisonment at Tulle Prison. The surprise forgiveness was viewed as an attempt by DeGaulle to win the support in the upcoming national elections from right-wing voters and the 750,000 "Pieds-Noirs", Europeans who had fled from Algeria after the Arab Algerian majority government had been elected.
- The defending women's downhill skiing champion, who had won in 1966 as Erika Schinegger, appeared at a press conference in Vienna to announce that he had completed the last of four gender reassignment surgeries and would resume his skiing and racing career as a man under his new name, Erik Schinegger.

== June 16, 1968 (Sunday) ==
- Following up on the retaking of the Odeon Theatre, French police evicted student rebels who had occupied the Sorbonne at the University of Paris. Hundreds of students in the Quarterier Latin assembled outside the historic Sorbonne building, and were driven away by riot police with tear gas and concussion grenades. Although "student leaders had claimed there were 500 occupiers inside" the building, the police reported that only 136 remained to be evacuated. The rebels peaceably filed out after Interior Ministry officials "told them they would be searched for arms but not arrested". No firearms were discovered in the search, but the police collected "several hundred clubs, pick handles and iron bars with chains, gas masks, helmets, gasoline for Molotov cocktails, garbage-can-cover shields and hundreds of leftist pamphlets and posters". Once the building was retaken, police hauled down the rebel banner and raised the French Tricolor on the flagpole.
- The 1968 U.S. Open golf tournament was won by Lee Trevino after he became the first golfer to shoot under par in all four of the 18-hole rounds of the event (69-68-69-69). He also tied the Open under par and tied the Open's record of 275 strokes on 72 holes. Going into the final round, Bert Yancey appeared on the verge of winning his first major championship, leading Trevino 205 to 206 after 54 holes, and the two were even during the first 8 holes, but Yancey did poorly on the 9th and 10th hole and finished with 76 strokes and third place. After the win, Trevino (who was born in Dallas) told reporters, "I'm about the happiest Mexican in the world right now."
- After the end of the Giro d'Italia, won by Eddy Merckx, 10 cyclists, including Italian champion Felice Gimondi, were disqualified for use of doping to enhance performance. It was the first major scandal in professional cycling. Giro d'Italia officials struck the records of all 10 finishers, which also changed the order of finish for 10 other cyclists. Later, the decision in Gimondi's case would be reversed.
- Five crewmembers of the U.S. Navy Swift boat PCF19 were killed by friendly fire when an American F-4 Phantom fired on the boat and sank it. Two other crewmembers were able to escape from the boat, which had been near the mouth of the Cua Viet River in South Vietnam.
- Born: James Patrick Stuart, American television actor known for Galactica 1980 and General Hospital; in Encino, California
- Died: Kim Su-yeong, 46, South Korean poet and translator; after being struck by bus while walking in Seoul

== June 17, 1968 (Monday) ==
- In a provocative poem, called The PCI and the young ones and published on the Italian magazine L'espresso, Pier Paolo Pasolini condemned the students' movement. The writer called the young protesters "petty bourgeois" and "dad's sons" and declared, "When yesterday you came to blows with the policemen, I sympathized with the policemen, because the policemen are the sons of the poor people." Pasolini's stance alluded to the fierce controversy, within the Communist PCI, between the secretary Luigi Longo and Giorgio Amendola, the supporter and the opponent, respectively, of the protest movements.
- Two Royal Australian Navy sailors on the guided-missile destroyer HMS Hobart were killed, and 7 others wounded, when the ship was struck by a trio of American AIM-7 Sparrow air-to-air missiles that had been fired by two American planes. The Hobart had been off the coast of North Vietnam when it was hit. Chief Electrician Henry Hunt and Quartermaster Raymond Butterworth became the first RAN members to die at sea in the Vietnam War.
- The Malayan Communist Party launched a second insurgency on the 20th anniversary of the June 17, 1948 Malayan Emergency. MCP guerrillas ambushed and killed 17 Malaysian soldiers in the northern state of Perak. The Second Malayan Emergency, which would last for 21 years, was imposed.
- The Actors' Equity Association, the labor union for stage actors, went on strike, canceling 19 of the 21 Broadway productions in New York City and road shows in other American cities. The strike was settled two days later.
- Tom Stoppard's play, The Real Inspector Hound, starring Richard Briers and Ronnie Barker, opened at the Criterion Theatre in London's West End.
- Died: Cassandre (Adolphe Jean-Marie Mouron), 67, French commercial artist; by suicide

== June 18, 1968 (Tuesday) ==
- Operation Šumava, a series of military exercises by the Joint Armed Forces of the member nations of the Warsaw Pact, began as scheduled, with most of the exercises taking place in Czechoslovakia, where the events of the Prague Spring were taking place. Several divisions of the Army of the Soviet Union remained behind after what proved to be part of a rehearsal for the Warsaw Pact invasion of Czechoslovakia in August.
- The Foreign Ministers of Argentina and Uruguay met at the Uruguayan capital, Montevideo, to begin the first discussions to end the boundary dispute between their nations.
- The 37th Air Division (37th AD) of the United States Air Force was inactivated, and Hopedale Air Station in Canada was abandoned.
- Died:
  - Nikolaus von Falkenhorst, 83, former German Wehrmacht General during World War II and convicted Nazi war criminal. Originally sentenced to death, von Falkenhorst had his punishment commuted to 20 years imprisonment and was released seven years after his conviction.
  - Sally O'Neil, 59, silent film leading lady of the 1920s

== June 19, 1968 (Wednesday) ==
- After two postponements, the Poor People's March on Washington took place in the nation's capital as a multiracial crowd of impoverished Americans gathered in front of the Lincoln Memorial. Coretta Scott King, the widow of Martin Luther King Jr., was the keynote speaker at the rally. The National Park Service had granted a seven-day extension of the original permit because of the postponements of the event, but the Southern Christian Leadership Conference was advised that it would have until 8:00 of the evening of June 23 to tear down the temporary housing called "Resurrection City" and to vacate the 15-acre area in West Potomac Park.
- President Johnson signed the Omnibus Crime Control and Safe Streets Act of 1968 into law.

== June 20, 1968 (Thursday) ==
- In the United Kingdom, Austin Currie, an elected member of Northern Ireland's parliament, the Stormont, called national attention to discrimination against the Roman Catholic minority in predominantly Protestant Northern Ireland by becoming a squatter. Currie and two other people learned of a house in Caledon, County Tyrone, that had been allocated to a single, 19-year old Protestant woman even though there were 269 families ahead of her on a waiting list for housing. When police from the Royal Ulster Constabulary moved in to remove Currie and his group, he had a television crew present to film the action. The BBC Evening News telecast the incident and "for many people in Britain, it was the first they heard of religious discrimination in Northern Ireland", an author would later note.
- A federal law, that had prohibited the printing of color images of United States postage stamps, was repealed as President Johnson signed legislation. "Since stamp counterfeiting is today virtually nonexistent," a White House statement said, "this restriction is no longer necessary. There is no reason now why the full meaning and beauty of our postage stamps cannot be communicated to all the world in color reproduction." Previously, stamp catalogs and encyclopedias could only display black-and-white images. The law had become obsolete after U.S. stamps were "impregnated with an invisible phosphor which causes canceling machines to reject counterfeits".
- David Ruffin was fired from The Temptations for missing a performance, after he developed a cocaine addiction and began questioning Berry Gordy's handling of the group's financial affairs.
- The Air Defense Artillery Branch was created as a separate combat branch of the United States Army to specialize in anti-aircraft weapons.
- Born:
  - Robert Rodriguez, American filmmaker, screenwriter, and musician; in San Antonio, Texas
  - Mateusz Morawiecki, Prime Minister of Poland from 2017 to 2023; in Wrocław
- Died: Rong Guotuan, 30, Chinese table tennis player who won the 1959 world championship while representing the People's Republic of China, hanged himself after being accused of spying during China's Cultural Revolution.

== June 21, 1968 (Friday) ==
- Five months after U.S. President Johnson had sent him a letter proposing a start on negotiations over limiting strategic missiles, Soviet Premier Alexei Kosygin sent an official response that did not commit to anything. Kosygin wrote in his letter to Johnson that the Soviet Union leaders "attach great importance to these questions, having in mind that they should be considered together... All aspects of this complex problem are now being carefully examined by us, and we hope that before long it will be possible more concretely to exchange views with regard to further ways of discussing this problem, if, of course, the general world situation does not hinder this." The first agreement, the Anti-Ballistic Missile Treaty would not be signed until 1972.
- In a press conference, U.S. Secretary of State Dean Rusk stated that nearly three months after the U.S. had limited its bombing to below the 17th parallel north in North Vietnam, infiltration by NVA combat troops into South Vietnam had increased to record levels, and North Vietnam had started a campaign of indiscriminate rocket attacks into residential areas of Saigon, the South Vietnamese capital.
- The last flight of the CIA's supersonic reconnaissance aircraft, the Lockheed A-12 Cygnus, was made by pilot Frank Murray. He flew the jet, designated "Article 131", from the runway at the Nevada Test and Training Range near the Groom dry lake, to the Lockheed airfield at Palmdale, California.
- Earl Warren formally announced his resignation as Chief Justice of the U.S. Supreme Court.
- The 18th Berlin International Film Festival opened in West Berlin.
- Born: Chris Gueffroy, East German restaurant waiter and the last person to be killed by border guards while trying to flee over the Berlin Wall (d. 1989); in Pasewalk

== June 22, 1968 (Saturday) ==
- Pope Paul VI, the Pontiff of the Roman Catholic Church, hosted Six metropolitans of Egypt's Coptic Christian Church and three archbishops of Ethiopia's Orthodox Tewahedo Church, along with 10 priests and 70 other adherents of Coptic Christianity, in a meeting of the churches that traced their founding to Saint Peter and Saint Mark, respectively. The Pope presented the delegation one of the relics of Saint Mark's Basilica, located in Venice, described as a small particle of bone from Saint Mark's body.
- The ARA Santa Cruz, an Argentine Navy destroyer, fired five rounds of artillery at two fishing vessels from the Soviet Union, after the Soviet crews ignored warnings to leave what Argentina had designated as its territorial waters. The fishing ships were then escorted to the harbor of Mar del Plata and detained for 20 days until the Soviet Ministry of Fish Industry paid fines for fishing without a license.
- Presidential hopefuls Hubert Humphrey and Richard Nixon won significant delegate victories in eight different states at the expense of rivals Eugene McCarthy and Nelson Rockefeller. Nixon notched nearly 75 more delegates spanning five states while Humphrey comprehensively won the home-state showdown with McCarthy in Minnesota.
- At the White House, President Johnson met with his main foreign policy advisers to discuss the U.S.-initiated Vietnam peace talks then underway in Paris. The talks were further discussed in a private meeting later that evening between Averell Harriman (the chief U.S. negotiator in Paris) and Soviet Ambassador to Washington Anatoly Dobrynin.
- Seven North Korean infiltrators were killed in a series of clashes along the Demilitarized Zone separating the two Koreas. South Korea had been tightening security suspecting the North Koreans had been planning an incident to coincide with the 28th anniversary of the start of the Korean war.
- The CIA reported that the Soviet Union had spent two billion dollars (USD) in the previous 12 months for foreign aid, with a majority of the expenditures going in military aid to North Vietnam and to Arab nations to replace their losses during the Six Day War.
- An infantry battalion of Army of the Republic of Vietnam (ARVN) troops was ambushed by Viet Cong guerrillas in "one of the worst setbacks in months for the South Vietnamese army"; 44 men were killed and 71 wounded during the day.
- In a complete reversal from previous statements, North Vietnam (through their representative in Budapest) admitted that it had troops stationed and fighting in South Vietnam.

== June 23, 1968 (Sunday) ==
- Seventy-four people were killed and 150 other injured in a stampede at a football match between Boca Juniors and Club Atlético River Plate in Buenos Aires, Argentina. River Plate was hosting the Boca Juniors and 90,000 spectators at its stadium, El Monumental. The teams had played to a 0–0 tie but, for reasons not entirely clear, some of the members of the exiting crowd hurried to get to one of the 24 stadium exits and pushed past other people. Shoving matches ensued, people fell and a panic ensued and 200 people were trampled "because everyone tried to leave at once".
- The first round of voting took place in the French National Assembly elections that had been scheduled following the public unrest of May. With a larger turnout than usual, President de Gaulle's party won 142 seats in the French National Assembly, a record number for the first round when most candidates don't receive a majority.
- Newspaper columnist Joseph Kraft coined the term "Middle America" to describe American voters who are economically "middle class" rather than "working class" or "upper class". Kraft would say later that his focus was on "Americans who were not young or poor or black" and the largest group of voters. The context was Kraft's column about the Democratic Party primary election in the state of New York, noting that the great majority of middle class voters didn't vote in the primary and that Democratic leaders could not ignore them in the general election. Previously the phrase was used as a geographic term, usually as a synonym for the Spanish-speaking nations in Central America.

== June 24, 1968 (Monday) ==
- At 11:00 in the morning, Washington D.C. police enforced the U.S. Department of the Interior order to evict the 300 remaining members of the Poor People's Campaign from West Potomac Park. Despite concerns that the removal of the squatters (whose permit had expired the evening before) would become violent, the process was quietly completed in 90 minutes. A police official told campaign leader Ralph Abernathy and the demonstrators, "Those of you who desire to be arrested, we will be systematic and we hope that you will co-operate with us as ladies and gentleman." Abernathy agreed to co-operate, and he and other leaders then lined up to be taken to a patrol wagon. The buildings that constituted "Resurrection City" were torn down in the afternoon by a city work crew. A historian would note later that while the Campaign "secured a few concessions from federal agencies, it cannot be considered successful. President Johnson ignored it and Congress closed its governmental coffers to the poor people's economic demands as the Vietnam War sapped the federal tax base."
- The St-Jean-Baptiste Day Riots, blamed on Quebecois separatists, broke out in Montreal during Prime Minister Pierre Trudeau's visit. Trudeau refused to leave despite threats to his safety. Estimates of attendance ranged as high as 400,000 (one-quarter of Montreal's population) for the evening parade. As the parade began at 8:00 p.m., 1,000 demonstrators led by Pierre Bourgault approached the reviewing stand, Montreal police charged the crowd, and the demonstrators began throwing glass bottles (including Molotov cocktails) and overturned cars before the riot was suppressed.
- In the wake of the recent assassinations of Martin Luther King Jr. and Senator Robert Kennedy, U.S. President Lyndon Johnson asked Congress for a bill requiring the registration of every gun in the United States and the licensing of every individual entrusted to use one. Johnson's request was backed up by Atty General Ramsey Clark and Senator Edward Kennedy who testified before the Senate Judiciary Committee of the need for the bill a few days later.
- Giorgio Rosa declared the independence of the Republic of Rose Island, an artificial micronation that he had designed and constructed. Located off of the coast of Rimini, Italy, the structure consisted of a 400-square-metre (4,300 sq ft) platform supported by nine pylons, and was designed to hold a restaurant, bar, nightclub, shop and post office. Italian police quickly took possession of the platform.
- In a ceremony at the White House George Ball was sworn in as the U.S. Ambassador to the United Nations.

== June 25, 1968 (Tuesday) ==
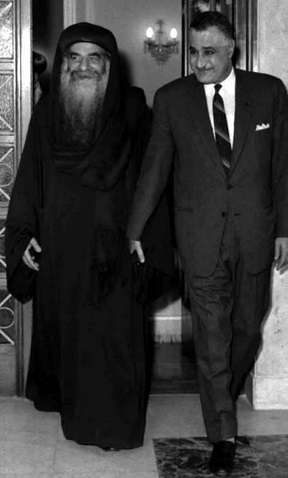
June 25, 1968: Pope Cyril VI (left) dedicates new cathedral

- The new Cathedral of Saint Mark, the seat of the Pope of the Coptic Orthodox Church of Alexandria, was dedicated in Cairo the day after the arrival of relics of Saint Mark that had been given by the Roman Catholic Church to a delegation. The ceremony was presided over by Pope Cyril VI of Alexandria and attended by Egypt's President Gamal Abdel Nasser and Ethiopia's Emperor Haile Selassie.
- Giovanni Leone was sworn in as the new Prime Minister of Italy after he and 22 other members of the Christian Democrats party formed Italy's 28th government since the end of World War II; it's a so-called "bathing cabinet", aimed to manage the current affair in the summer, waiting for a clarification of the confused situation got out of the May election. President Giuseppe Saragat administered the oath as the Christian Democrats, who had a plurality of seats in Parliament, sought to form a coalition government with the Socialist Party.
- U.S. negotiator Cyrus Vance spoke privately with the North Vietnamese delegation in Paris to discuss the possibility of a two phased approach to de-escalation by both sides in the Vietnam War. The formulation of the proposal had been discussed previously by U.S. Ambassador to France Sargent Shriver and his Soviet counterpart Valerian Zorin, and at a White House lunch meeting between President Lyndon Johnson. After two days, however, Vance reported that he was met by "more of the standard party line" from the North Vietnamese, but that the two sides agreed to meet again.
- As the Prague Spring continued, Czechoslovakia's National Assembly passed the Law on Judicial Rehabilitation, called "a humane step, rare in history, and unique in the communist world, to restore justice to the victims of illegalities of an entire historical period" "to re-examine the cases of up to 100,000 individuals unjustly sentenced" under the Communist government, to compensate victims and to punish unjust prosecution. The CIA noted that additional Soviet troops had entered Czechoslovak territory to join the Warsaw Pact military exercises that were underway at that time.
- Bobby Bonds made his Major League Baseball debut and hit a grand slam in his first game, becoming only the second major league player (after Bill Duggleby in 1898) to do so. In the 21st century, five other players would hit a grand slam in their first game. Bonds's hit came in a 9–0 win for the San Francisco Giants over the Los Angeles Dodgers. Coincidentally, Duggleby's grand slam on April 21, 1898, had been against the Giants as well (in a 13–4 win).
- Canada's Liberal Party, led by Prime Minister Pierre Trudeau, won 58% control of the House of Commons, getting 154 of the 264 available seats. Prior to the vote, the Liberals had 128, five short of a majority. The 102-member Senate of Canada, whose members are appointed by the Governor-General, was split among 62 Liberals, 28 Conservatives and 3 independents, with 9 vacancies.
- Died: Tony Hancock, 44, English comedian; in his flat at Bellevue Hill, New South Wales of an overdose of amylobarbitone tablets washed down with vodka.

== June 26, 1968 (Wednesday) ==
- U.S. President Lyndon Johnson nominated Associate Supreme Court Justice Abe Fortas to become the next Chief Justice of the United States, to replace the retiring Earl Warren, and federal appellate judge Homer Thornberry to fill Fortas's associate justice seat. Opposition to Fortas began immediately and his name would be withdrawn on October 3; President Johnson would not make another nomination, and Warren Burger would become the new Chief Justice on June 9, 1969, after being nominated by Johnson's successor, Richard M. Nixon. Johnson's nomination of Fortas was not universally unpopular and was supported by influential senators Everett Dirksen (Republican), Richard Russell Jr (Democrat), Mike Mansfield (Democrat) and Ralph Yarborough (Democrat) as well as Attorney General Ramsey Clark.
- The U.S. Federal Communications Commission issued the landmark "Carterfone decision", allowing devices manufactured by companies other than the AT&T Corporation to connect directly to the AT&T telephone network without charge, as long as the devices did not cause harm to the network. The Carterfone itself was a device that allowed users of a two-way radio system to talk directly to telephone users. AT&T would respond in September by changing its network programming to allow connections only with recognized electronic signals that could only be produced by a "protective coupling arrangement" that would need to be leased from AT&T.
- The island of Iwo Jima and the Bonin Islands, also known as the Ogasawara Islands, were returned to Japan after 23 years of occupation by the United States Navy, and Japanese citizens were allowed to return. At 12:15 p.m. local time, the American flag was lowered on Iwo Jima, where one of the bloodiest campaigns in World War II had been fought by the U.S. Marines against the Japanese Imperial Army, and the flag of Japan was raised in its place. By agreement, however, the American flag remained at Mount Suribachi, where the first U.S. flag had been raised during the island's capture on February 23, 1945.
- Confirmation of the discovery of the remains of Saint Peter was announced by Pope Paul VI, who reported the authenticity of bones found in a tomb discovered in December 1950 beneath St. Peter's Basilica. "We are right in believing that the few but sacred mortal remains of the Prince of Apostles have been traced," the Pope told an audience, based on unspecified evidence from expert studies that he described as "convincing". The announcement made three days before the official observance of the Feast of Saints Peter and Paul during the 1900th anniversary of their martyrdom in 68 AD.
- The "March of the One Hundred Thousand" took place in Rio de Janeiro as crowds demonstrated against the Brazilian military government. Contemporary reports estimated the crowd to have been 15,000 marchers at its highest. Despite tying up downtown traffic, the march remained peaceful, however, and ended when student leader Valdimir Palmeira announced that "a commission of students, teachers and priests" would negotiate with the military government about student demands.
- The Wesleyan Methodist Church and the Pilgrim Holiness Church were formally merged to create a new denomination, The Wesleyan Church.
- Born:
  - Paolo Maldini, Italian soccer football left-back for A.C. Milan for 25 seasons and 647 matches, and for the Italian national team for 126 matches; in Milan
  - Shannon Sharpe, American NFL football tight end, TV personality, and inductee into the Pro Football Hall of Fame; in Chicago

== June 27, 1968 (Thursday) ==
- Citing "an increase in the enemy's threat due to both a greater flow of replacements and a change in tactics," the U.S. Command in South Vietnam announced that it would pull its troops out of that nation's northernmost province, Quang Trị, and close the Khe Sanh Combat Base. The United States Marines had sustained over 2,500 casualties during a 77-day siege of Khe Sanh by Viet Cong and North Vietnamese Army attackers. The South Vietnamese Army, with the financial support of the United States, would take over the responsibility of defending Quang Tri, which would become the first province to be conquered during the invasion of 1975. North Vietnam would cite the date of the announcement as a milestone in its history, noting that "On July 15, 1968, our soldiers were in complete control of Khe Sanh."
- An essay that one historian would describe later as "the last straw for Prague's neighbors", "The Two Thousand Words Manifesto", was published in the new Czechoslovak literary journal Literární listy, 54 days before the invasion by the other nations of the Warsaw Pact. Ludvík Vaculík had written "Two Thousand Words that Belong to Workers, Farmer, Officials, Scientists, Artists and Everybody", and more than 60 other Czechoslovak authors had signed the declaration. The Politburo of the Communist Party of Czechoslovakia would decide against arresting Vaculik or the other signatories for their defiance, and the Soviet Union and the other Communist nations of Eastern Europe would conclude that "The Two Thousand Words" was the sign that the reforms of the "Prague Spring" had gotten out of control.
- In London, American murder suspect James Earl Ray appeared for an extradition hearing at the Bow Street Magistrates' Court before Magistrate Frank Milton. British barrister David Calcutt appeared upon behalf of the United States to request extradition so that Ray could be put on trial for the assassination of Martin Luther King Jr. Roger Frisby, appointed to appear on Ray's behalf, argued that Dr. King had been "a political figure" and that the extradition agreement between the UK and the U.S. did not apply to political crimes. On questioning by Frisby, Ray said that he did not kill Dr. King.
- Two days of review of experiments were made at the Manned Spacecraft Center (MSC) to determine what progress had been made in the development of experiment hardware for the Apollo Applications Program, and showed "very slow progress" on fixing problems identified in a January review by the MSC on developing medical, habitability and engineering experiments. The MSC noted a critical lack of overall motivation.
- Maccabi Tel Aviv F.C. defeated Bnei Yehuda Tel Aviv F.C., 2–1, to win the Israel Super Cup and the unofficial championship of Israeli soccer football. Maccabi had finished first place in the Liga Leumit season, and Bnei Yehuda had won the Israel State Cup playoffs on June 12.
- U.S. and North Korean officials met at Panmunjom to discuss the terms for the release of the crew of the captured U.S. Navy vessel USS Pueblo (AGER-2).
- Died: Colonel Renzo Rocca, 58, an Italian official formerly with the Italian military intelligence agency SIFAR; from a gunshot wound to the head. The death was ruled a suicide, despite speculation that Rocca was murdered.

== June 28, 1968 (Friday) ==
- The Uniform Monday Holiday Act was signed into the law by U.S. President Johnson, creating the pattern for most American national holidays to fall on Mondays and providing "3-day weekends" throughout the year. Washington's Birthday had always been on February 22, Memorial Day on May 30, Columbus Day on October 12 (in 34 of the 50 states) and Veterans Day on November 11. Starting in 1971, Washington's Birthday would be on the third Monday in February; Memorial Day on the last Monday in May; Columbus Day on the second Monday in October in all states; and Veterans Day on the fourth Monday in October (although it would be restored permanently to November 11 in 1978). The legislation had passed the U.S. House of Representatives on May 10 by a 218 to 83 vote, but sailed through the U.S. Senate on June 24 "by voice vote on a routine call of the calendar with only about eight senators present."
- A passenger on board a chartered Douglas DC-3 airliner fell 8,000 feet to his death when the rear door opened and he was pulled out. Jerrold Potter of Pontiac, Illinois, was one of 23 passengers who were en route to the annual Lions Clubs International convention in Dallas after boarding at Kankakee, Illinois on the DC-3, operated by the now defunct Purdue Airlines. Potter had told friends that he was going to the lavatory at the back of the plane. The pilot told reporters that Potter might have mistaken the airplane's rear exit for the door to the bathroom. At the time, the plane's position was over Phelps County, Missouri, about 10 miles northwest of Rolla. Potter's body, which fell somewhere in the Ozark Mountains, would still be missing 50 years later.
- Johnson also sent proposed legislation for Congress to introduce a resolution that would amend the U.S. Constitution, allowing qualified U.S. citizens the right to vote at the age of 18. "Reason does not permit us to ignore any longer the reality that 18-year-old young Americans are prepared," the President wrote in a message to Congress, "by education, by experience, by exposure to public affairs of their own land and all the world — to exercise the privilege to vote." Although the bill failed, new legislation would be introduced in 1971 and the Twenty-sixth Amendment to the United States Constitution would be ratified within four months.
- The Revenue and Expenditure Control Act of 1968 was signed into law, temporarily raising individual and corporate federal income taxes in the United States and cutting spending by $14 billion. Bill Moyers, an aide to President Johnson, would later say that the two and a half year delay in seeking a tax increase from Congress had been "the single most devastating decision in the Johnson administration" and the marking of "the beginning of the end, a time when he lost control of the administration and lost control of events."
- Born:
  - Adam Woodyatt, British actor who has portrayed Ian Beale in the BBC soap opera EastEnders for more than 30 years since the program debut in 1985; in Walthamstow
  - Chayanne (stage name for Elmer Figueroa Arce), American pop music singer and composer; in Rio Piedras, Puerto Rico

== June 29, 1968 (Saturday) ==
- Southeast Airlines Flight 101, a Douglas DC-3 flight from Marathon, Florida to Key West, was hijacked to Cuba shortly after takeoff, by one of its 15 passengers, an individual who had bought a ticket under the name "E. H. Carter". Although there had been previous instances of airplane flights being forced to land in Havana, the Southeast hijacking would attract copycat crimes throughout the month of July and the rest of 1968 and 1969. The pilot, a stewardess and the 14 remaining passengers were returned to the United States, but co-pilot George Prellezo, who had become a naturalized American citizen after fleeing the Castro government in 1960, was arrested and charged with desertion and for stealing a Cuban cargo plane to make his escape. Prellezo would be released three weeks later.
- The Viet Cong carried out the massacre of 88 civilians in Son Tra, a coastal fishing village outside where the houses had been built with money from the United States because of the residents' opposition to Communism. Two months earlier, Viet Cong soldiers had come to Son Tra and made the threat that the village would be destroyed if the leaders continued to cooperate with the Americans. Another 103 people were wounded, and 50 houses were burned. Troops who were assigned to protect Son Tra would say later that they were unaware of the raid until after it had ended.
- The "Midsummer High Weekend" rock concert was held in Hyde Park, London; Pink Floyd, T-Rex, Jethro Tull and Roy Harper were among those appearing. It was the first large free concert ever held in the UK and attracted 650,000 people.
- The Indian state of Bihar was put under President's rule after none of the political parties were able to form a government.
- Born: Brian d'Arcy James, American stage actor; in Saginaw, Michigan
- Died: Paddy Driscoll, 73, American professional football and baseball player, and inductee into the Pro Football Hall of Fame

== June 30, 1968 (Sunday) ==
- A force of 18,500 Red Army troops and 650 tanks from the Soviet Union remained in Czechoslovakia, even though the Operation Šumava military exercise had been scheduled to end on June 30. Soviet Army Marshal Ivan Yakubovsky declined to give an explanation to Czechoslovak Defense Minister Martin Dzúr for prolonging the exercises, and when Prime Minister Alexander Dubček asked Marshal Yakubovsky about his intentions, the Soviet general said that he would "try" to finish the maneuvers by July 3, a deadline that would subsequently be ignored. It would not be until July 11 that Marshal Yakubovsky would pledge to withdraw the remaining forces over a three-day period to end no later than July 16. A withdrawal was finally completed by July 22, after several halts.
- In the second round of voting in France's parliamentary elections, for those seats where neither candidate had won a majority in the first round, Charles de Gaulle's party won a majority of the 487 seats in the Assemblée Nationale. The UDR (led by Prime Minister Georges Pompidou) and the de Gaulle supporting Républicains indépendants, which had already had 243 seats, picked up another 111 for almost 73% control. The UDR alone had 293 of the 487 seats and had run on a campaign of "law and order"; the loss of seats by leftist Socialist and Communist parties was seen as a response by the voting public to the paralyzing strikes of the previous month.
- The Lockheed C-5 Galaxy heavy (248 tons when empty) military transport aircraft, described as "the biggest airplane in the world", made its very first flight. Lockheed test pilot Leo J. Sullivan guided the plane's liftoff from Marietta, Georgia, where the GELAC (Lockheed-Georgia) aeronautical systems factory had constructed the aircraft.
- The Immigration and Nationality Act of 1965 went into effect as the quotas that had severely limited immigration to the United States from African and Asian nations were ended.
- Born: Phil Anselmo, American heavy metal musician and lead vocalist for Pantera; in New Orleans
