= Holy Order of MANS =

American spiritual organization

- Logo for the Holy Order of MANS
- Abbreviation: HOOM
- Formation: July 1968 (original); re-incorporated February 2012
- Founder: Earl Wilbur Blighton ("Father Paul")
- Dissolved: 1988 (merged into Christ the Savior Brotherhood)
- Type: Non-denominational, non-sectarian spiritual/mystic school; New Age religious order
- Headquarters: Corte Madera, California
- Location(s): Originally San Francisco; Order Houses across the U.S. and abroad
- Founder: Earl Wilbur Blighton (d. 1974)
- Website: holyorderofmans.com, holyorderofmans.org

The Holy Order of MANS is a non-denominational, non-sectarian spiritual mystic school. Incorporated in 2012, the Order headquarters is located in Corte Madera, California. The school curriculum is taught in person and through online classes, which are accessed through its website . The Sacraments of Baptism and Holy Communion are available. The Order ordains both men and women into the Priesthood. The school curriculum is available for study on its alternate website . The Order publishes books for student use and the general public based on its curriculum.

== History ==
The Holy Order of MANS was initially incorporated in July 1968 by its founder, Earl Wilbur Blighton, a retired electrical engineer and minister, who used the honorific Rt. Rev. was also known as Master Paul or Father Paul. A number of his previous religious associations included the Roman Catholic Church, Spiritualism, New Thought and the Rosicrucian Order. The stated mission and purpose of the Holy Order of MANS was to guide all mankind and the churches of Christ to union with the Divine Self of God within, the Divine Spark. According to Blighton, the Christ is returning now. A willing intellectual and emotional assent to religious doctrine was not enough. Full experiential knowledge (gnosis) of God beyond merely intuitive spiritual insight was true redemption. The principal means of effecting this was by the praxis of theurgy and bhakti.

Interest in the classes grew, and in 1968, Dr. Blighton and his wife Helen Blighton, known as Mother Ruth, established a monastic seminary with a specific curriculum, incorporated in California, which was named the Holy Order of MANS (HOOM). It continued to be non-sectarian, and not affiliated with any religion. It became an international organization with Order Houses of members in almost every state of the United States and several were abroad.

The Holy Order of MANS was a religious order grounded in what it viewed as the esoteric teachings of "The Great Christ" through "The Master Jesus", which identifies it as New Age. The order was founded in the 1960s "in the culturally innovative milieu of San Francisco", USA. The Order has been described as "apostolic catholic", and some used the term "Pauline catholic or Pauline Christianity", in its claim of possessing received esoteric apostolic doctrine without the necessity of canonical ordination in the line of Orthodox Catholic apostolic succession.

Paul died in 1974, and the Order continued to operate until the late 1980s.

Ella Hoffman Rigney joined the Order in 1975. Mrs. Rigney was intrigued by the first Raphael House, located on Gough and McAllister Streets in San Francisco and started by the Holy Order of MANS, a non-sectarian group of volunteers dedicated to service to the community. The first iteration of Raphael House served homeless women and children. Needing more space to house families together, they moved to the current location at 1065 Sutter Street, formerly a private hospital.

In 1988, the remaining members and hierarchy of the Holy Order of MANS joined the Eastern Orthodox Church under the new name Christ the Savior Brotherhood (abbreviated CSB). In 1988, the Holy Order of MANS seminary school curriculum, Ordinations of men and woman and Order Sacraments were discontinued.

Since 1988 the HOOM curriculum was followed in many groups, including the Science of Man in Oregon, which was led by Blighton's wife, Ruth, until her death in 2005, and the Gnostic Order of Christ, founded by HOOM "Master Timothy" Delbert Harris.

In February 2012, the Holy Order of MANS was incorporated in the State of California as a religious non-profit in California and maintains two websites and a YouTube channel where the original Order curriculum of study, a calendar of classes, including on Zoom, and events, and literature for sale may be found. The Order was assisted in its corporate filing at the California Secretary of State’s Business Programs by Ernesto Resurreccion, Corporate Documents Examiner. The Order continues to actively teach the original Order curriculum created by Earl W. Blighton.

Order books are now available for sale by the Holy Order of MANS through several distributors, including Amazon. The Holy Sacraments, Vows, Initiations of Baptism, Illumination, Self-Realization, Ordination of Priests, and Master Teachers with the Power to Ordain are currently performed by the Holy Order of MANS. Over the years, former Order members have continued the work of the Order in locations across America.

== Scholarship ==
As Sarah A. Riccardi-Swartz explains, "very little is written" about the order, though it has been written up in a few studies of new age religions. The one monograph on the order which was available by the time of Riccardi-Swartz's study is Philip Lucas's The Odyssey of a New Religion: The Holy Order of MANS From New Age to Orthodoxy (Indiana UP, 1995).
