= List of universities and colleges in Slovakia =

This is a list of universities and colleges in Slovakia.

== Terminology ==
The Slovak term "vysoká škola" ("school of higher education", literally "high school", compare the German name Hochschule), which for lack of other expressions is also translated into English as "college", can refer to all schools of higher (i.e. tertiary) education, or in a narrower sense only to those schools of higher education that are not universities.

For an explanation of the terms public/state/private school see Education in Slovakia.

== Current schools of higher education ==
The schools are ordered by the name of their seat.

=== Public schools of higher education ===
- Matej Bel University in Banská Bystrica
- Academy of Arts in Banská Bystrica
- Slovak University of Technology in Bratislava
- Comenius University in Bratislava
- University of Economics in Bratislava
- Academy of Fine Arts and Design in Bratislava
- Academy of Performing Arts in Bratislava
- Selye János University in Komárno – the only Hungarian language school of higher education in Slovakia
- University of Veterinary Medicine in Košice
- Pavol Jozef Šafárik University in Košice
- Technical University of Košice
- University of Constantinus the Philosopher in Nitra
- Slovak University of Agriculture in Nitra
- University of Prešov in Prešov
- Catholic University in Ružomberok
- University of Trnava in Trnava
- University of Ss. Cyril and Methodius in Trnava
- Alexander Dubček University of Trenčín in Trenčín
- Technical University in Zvolen
- University of Žilina in Žilina

=== State schools of higher education ===
- Police Academy in Bratislava
- Slovak Medical University in Bratislava
- Armed Forces Academy of General Milan Rastislav Štefánik in Liptovský Mikuláš

=== Private schools of higher education ===
- College of International and Public Relations Prague
- Bratislava School of Law
- Bratislava International School of Liberal Arts (BISLA)
- School of Economics and Management in Public Administration in Bratislava
- Dubnica Technology Institute in Dubnica nad Váhom
- St. Elizabeth College of Health and Social Work in Bratislava, n. o.
- Security Management College in Košice
- International Business College ISM Slovakia in Prešov
- Danubius University
- College of Management in Trenčín – a subsidiary of the foreign City University
- Ján Albrecht Music and Art Academy in Banská Štiavnica
- DSA - Deutsch-Slowakische Akademien

== Historical schools of higher education ==
Chronological development of (known) schools of higher education up to the present

- cca. 864–885: Great Moravian Academy (probably in Devín)
- 1465–1491: Universitas Istropolitana (Academia Istropolitana)
- 1635–1777: University of Trnava (1777 moved to Buda, 1786 to Pest)
- 1657–1777/1921: University of Košice (1777-1850 turned to a Royal Academy, 1850-1921 to a Law Academy)
- 1667–early 20th century: Prešov Collegium
- 1763-1919: Mining and Forestry Academy in Banská Štiavnica (1919 moved to Sopron, Hungary)
- 1768-1776: Collegium oeconomicum in Senec
- 1777-1912: Royal Academy (in Trnava first, 1784 moved to Bratislava, 1850 – 1912 called Imperial and Royal Academy, 1912 part of the Elizabethan University-see below)
- 1860-1919: Law Academy in Prešov
- 1880-?: Greek Catholic Academy of Divinity in Prešov
- 1882-?: Evangelic Lutheran Theological Academy in Prešov
- 1892-?: Evangelic Lutheran Theological Academy in Bratislava
- 1906 - 1918: Agricultural Academy in Košice
- 1912-1919: Elizabethan University in Bratislava
- since 1919: Comenius University (1939-1954 called Slovak University)
- since 1937: Slovak University of Technology (initially called Slovak College of Technology, 1938 moved to Martin, 1939 to Bratislava)
- since 1940: University of Economics (1940-1945 called Commercial College, 1945-1949 Slovak Commercial College, 1949 – 1952 College of Economic Sciences, 1952 – 1990s Economic College)
- 1946 – 1952: College of Agricultural and Forestry Engineering in Košice (1952 divided to the College of Agriculture in Nitra and the College of Forestry and Wood Processing in Zvolen)
- since 1949: College/Academy of Performing Arts in Bratislava
- since 1949: College/Academy of Fine Arts and Design in Bratislava
- since 1952: Technical University of Košice (initially called College of Technology)
- since 1952: Slovak University of Agriculture in Nitra (initially called College of Agriculture in Nitra, in 1992 part of the Nitra University)
- since 1952: Technical University in Zvolen (initially called College of Forestry and Wood Processing in Zvolen)
- od 1959/1992: University of Constantinus the Philosopher in Nitra (1959-1964 a pedagogical institute, 1964 – 1992 an independent Pedagogical Faculty, in 1992 part of Nitra University, 1992-1996 called Pedagogical College)
- od 1960: University of Žilina (initially called College of Transportation, 1979 – 1990s College of Transportation and Communications)
- 1953 – 1959: Pedagogical College in Bratislava (1959 again part of the Comenius University)
- since 1959: Pavol Jozef Šafárik University in Košice (it arose from a subsidiary of the Faculty of Medicine of the Comenius University in 1948)
- 1969 – 1974: University of 17 November in Bratislava (a subsidiary of the university of the same name in Prague)
- 1969(?) – (?)1990: Klement Gottwald Military Political Academy (until 1972 a political faculty of the Military Academy of Klement Gottwald, 1969 moved from ? to Bratislava)
- 1970 – (?)1990: an independent faculty of the Political College in Prague established by the Central Committee of the Communist Party of Czechoslovakia
- since 1970: University of Veterinary Medicine in Košice (initially called Veterinary College, it arose from a faculty of the College of Agriculture that stayed in Košice after the College of Agriculture and Forestry Engineering has been abolished.)
- 1973 – 1990: Faculty of Investigation of the ŠtB (a KGB equivalent) in Bratislava of the College of National Security Corps (i.e. police academy) based in Prague (in 1990 a part of the employees switched to the Institute for Education and Teaching of the Federal Ministry of the Interion, see also below since 1992)
- since 1991: City University, Bellevue, USA (grants diplomas accredited in the US, not in Slovakia)
- since 1991/92: University of Matej Bel in Banská Bystrica (arose from an independent Pedagogical Faculty founded in 1959 and from a faculty of the University of Economics having been active in Banská Bystrica since 1973)
- since 1992: (the new) University of Trnava
- 1 July 1992 – 11 Dec. 1992: Nitra University (arose through a - temporary - merge of the Pedagogical Faculty in Nitra and of the College of Agriculture in Nitra)
- 2005-2021: University of Central Europe in Skalica
- since 1992: Police Academy in Bratislava
- since 1993: General Milan Rastislav Štefánik Armed Forces Academy in Liptovský Mikuláš (until 2004 called the Military Academy in Liptovský Mikuláš)
- since ? - 2004: General Milan Rastislav Štefánik Air Force Academy in Košice (until 1993 called Air Force College of the Slovak National Uprising in Košice, in 2004 merged with the University of Technology in Košice)
- since 1997: University of St. Cyril and Methodius of Trnava
- since 1997: Alexander Dubček University of Trenčín in Trenčín (until 2002 called the University of Trenčín (?))
- since 1997: Academy of Arts in Banská Bystrica
- since 1997: University of Prešov in Prešov (arose by splitting from the Pavol Jozef Šafárik University)
- since 1999: College of Management in Trenčín
- since 2000: Catholic University in Ružomberok (arose from the Religions Teacher's Faculty of the University of Žilina, which had been created within the Trnava University in 1996 from a pedagogical institute and made part of the University of Žilina in 1997)
- since 2002: Slovak Medical University in Bratislava (it arose from the Slovak Postgraduate Academy founded in ?)
- od 2003: St. Elizabeth College of Health and Social Work, n. o.
- since 2004: Ján Selye University in Komárno (a Hungarian language university)
- since 2004: Bratislava College of Law
- since 2004: College of Public Administration Economics and Management in Bratislava
- since 2005: College in Sládkovičovo
- since 2005: International Business College ISM Slovakia in Prešov
- since 2006: Dubnica Technology Institute in Dubnica nad Váhom
- since 2006: Bratislava International School of Liberal Arts (BISLA)
- since 2006: Security Management College in Košice
- since 2008: Ján Albrecht Music and Art Academy in Banská Štiavnica

== See also ==
- Education in Slovakia
- List of universities and colleges by country
- Lists of universities and colleges
