= Juraj Krúpa =

Slovak politician and security analyst

Member of the National Council of the Slovak Republic
- Incumbent
- Assumed office 2020

Personal details
- Born: 28 December 1976 (age 49) Piešťany, Czechoslovakia
- Party: OĽaNO (2020-2022); SaS
- Education: Matej Bel University
- Occupation: Politician

Juraj Krúpa (born 28 December 1976) is a Slovak security analyst and a member of the National Council of the Slovak Republic.

== Early life and education ==
In 2001, Krúpa graduated from the Master's programme in International Relations and Diplomacy at the Faculty of Political Science and International Relations of the Matej Bel University in Banská Bystrica. He worked at the Ministry of Defence before working as Permanent Delegation of Slovakia to NATO between 2013 and 2016. From 2016 until 2019, Krúpa worked as the Director of the Security and Defence Programme at the Slovak Institute for Security Policy.

== Political career ==
Krúpa ran as a candidate for OĽaNO in the 2020 parliamentary elections. However, he was not a member of the party. In the Parliament, he was the chairman of the National Assembly Committee for Defence and Security, a member of the Special Control Committee of the National Assembly to control the activities of the Military Intelligence and a member of the Permanent Delegation of the National Assembly of the Slovak Republic to the NATO Parliamentary Assembly.

At the end of June 2022, Krúpa abstained from voting on the 1 billion Euro package for families proposed by Finance Minister Igor Matovič (OĽaNO), thus failing to support the override of President Zuzana Čaputová's veto. Krúpa was the only OĽaNO MP to abstain, which brought him to the attention of SaS chairman Richard Sulík.

On 28 July 2022, Krúpa announced his resignation from the OĽaNO parliamentary club. A day later he announced his move to the SaS club. About his transition he said: "I ran as a candidate for the anti-corruption movement and found myself in an ultra-conservative movement that fights against liberalism". "He described as a red line the consideration of admitting the possibility of forming a minority government with the support of "various criminals, extremists and fascists" during the coalition crisis". The Republican Council of SaS approved Krúpa as a team leader for defence, but Krúpa has not yet joined the party.
