= European University Hockey League =

Ice hockey league, founded in 2013

- EUHL logo
- Countries: Slovakia (5 teams); Czech Republic (3 teams); Austria (1 team); Poland (1 team)
- Region(s): Central Europe
- League President: (Slovakia) Ľubomír Sekeráš
- LeagueVice-President: (Slovakia)
- Founded: 2013
- First season: 2013–14
- No. of teams: 10
- Recent Champions: UK Praha (1st title)
- Most successful club: UK Praha (3 titles)
- Headquarters: Trenčín, Slovakia
- Website: http://www.euhl.eu

The European University Hockey League (EUHL) is the first European university league in ice hockey, founded in 2013. It is managed by the European University Hockey Association (EUHA). The idea for a university hockey league in Europe came from Jaroslav Straka, with support from Ľubomír Sekeráš, František Sádecký, and Peter Spankovic. The initial idea was for a pan-European expansion through the creation of four divisions to save money and time: Eastern (Slovakia, Czech Republic, Austria, Poland, Hungary), Western (Germany I, France, Belgium, The Netherlands), North (Sweden, Finland, Norway, Denmark) and South (Germany II, Austria II, Switzerland, Slovenia). Additional applicants came from Slovakia, the Czech Republic, Austria, Sweden, Finland, Norway, Germany, United Kingdom, France, and Hungary, accompanied by universities and associations from the USA.

== Trophy ==
The winner of the league is awarded the Sekeráš Championship Trophy, named after former Slovak NHL player Ľubomír Sekeráš, who is the co-founder of the league.

== Divisions ==
Four divisions are planned – Northern, Eastern, Southern and Western. The Northern division will contain teams from universities in Sweden, Finland, Norway, and Denmark; the Eastern division teams from Slovakia, Czech Republic, Austria, Poland, and Hungary; the Southern division teams from Germany, Switzerland, Slovenia, and Austria, and the Western division teams from France, Germany, Belgium, and the Netherlands.

For the first season in 2013–14, only six teams were involved, forming only one division.

== Teams ==
At the beginning of the first season only five teams were confirmed – three from Slovakia and two from the Czech Republic – even though more universities were interested in joining the league. However, on 13 November 2013 a new participant, VŠEMvs Managers from Bratislava joined the league, thus increasing the number of participants to six.

In the second season the following teams participated:

Institution	Location	Founded	Affiliation	Team name	Joined	Arena	Capacity	Titles	Website
Charles University in Prague	(Czech Republic) Prague	1347	Public	UK Praha	2013	Zimní stadion Slaný	3,200	1	
City University of Seattle (VŠM)	(Slovakia) Trenčín	1999	Private	CityU Gladiators Trenčín	2013	Zimný štadión Pavla Demitru	6,150	0	
Czech Technical University	(Czech Republic) Prague	2001	Public	Technika Praha	2013			0	
Pan-European University	(Slovakia) Bratislava	2004	Private	Paneuropa Kings	2013	Zimný štadión Vladimíra Dzurillu	3,500	0	
Slovak University of Technology	(Slovakia) Bratislava	1937	Public	Slávia STU	2013	Zimný štadión Vladimíra Dzurillu	3,500	0	
University of International and Public Relations Prague in Bratislava	(Slovakia) Bratislava		Private	Diplomats Pressburg	2014				
University of West Bohemia	(Czech Republic) Plzeň	1991	Public	Akademici Plzeň	2014				
Matej Bel University	(Slovakia) Banská Bystrica	1992	Public	UMB Banská Bystrica	2014				
The Podhale State College of Applied Sciences in Nowy Targ	(Poland) Nowy Targ			PPWSZ – Podhale Nowy Targ	2015				
Wyższa Szkoła Biznesu - National-Louis University	(Poland) Krynica-Zdrój	1928	Public	Academy KTH 1928 Krynica-Zdrój	2016				
University of Graz	(Austria) Graz	1585	Public	UHT Dukes Graz	2015	Eisstadion Liebenau	4,050		
University of Prešov	(Slovakia) Prešov		Public	UNIPO Warriors	2016				
