= Vysoká škola =

Type of institution of tertiary education in Slovakia

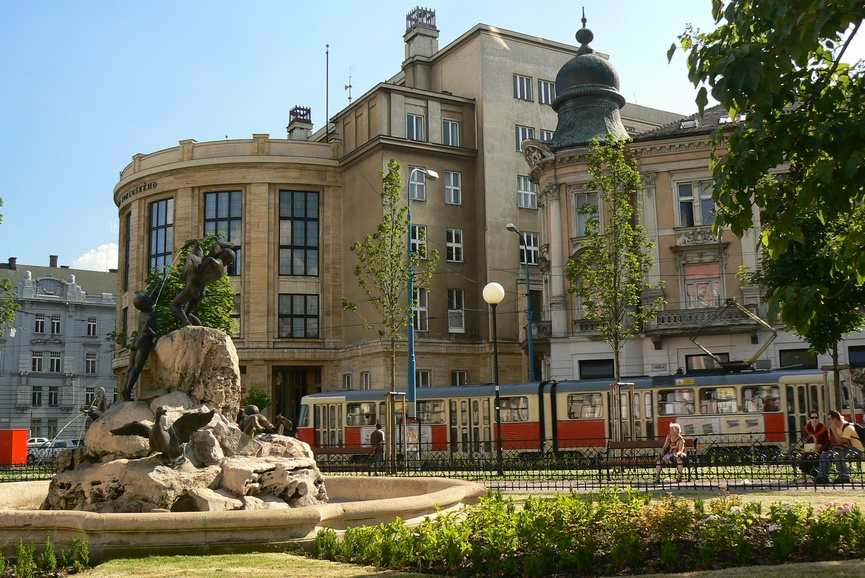
Comenius University building in Bratislava

Vysoká škola is a term used for institutions of tertiary education in Slovakia and the Czech Republic. The Slovak/Czech term can be translated as “school of higher education” (literally “high school”, compare the German “Hochschule”) or, for lack of other expressions, it is also being translated into English as "college". The term can refer to all schools of higher (i.e. tertiary) education, or, in a narrower sense, only to those that are not universities.

== See also ==
- List of universities and colleges in Slovakia
- List of universities in the Czech Republic
