= Dušan Galis =

Slovak footballer and politician (born 1949)

Personal information
- Date of birth: 24 November 1949 (age 76)
- Place of birth: Ružomberok, Czechoslovakia
- Position: Forward

Youth career
- 1960–1968: Dolný Kubín

Senior career*
Years	Team	Apps	(Gls)
1968–1970	Dolný Kubín		
1970–1972	Strojárne Martin		
1972–1977	Košice		
1977–1981	Slovan Bratislava		
1981	Cádiz		
1982	Žilina		
1982–1983	KSC Hasselt		
1983–1984	Petržalka		

International career
1975–1977	Czechoslovakia	8	(1)

Managerial career
- 1990–1995: Slovan Bratislava
- 1996–1997: Slovan Bratislava
- 1997–1999: Spartak Trnava
- 1999: Omonia
- 2000–2002: Petržalka
- 2003–2006: Slovakia
- 2013–2014: Slovan Bratislava
Medal record
Representing Czechoslovakia
UEFA European Championship
Winner	1976 Yugoslavia
- * Club domestic league appearances and goals

Dušan Galis (born 24 November 1949) is a Slovak politician and a former football player and manager. In the Czechoslovak league he played 226 matches, scoring 89 goals. He was capped eight times for Czechoslovakia national team, scoring one goal. He was a participant at the 1976 European Football Championship where he became European Champion with his national team.

== Playing career ==
Galis played for the youth team of Dolný Kubín. At age 20 he played for a 3rd Division team. His team was promoted in 1971 to Czechoslovak 2nd Division. Galis went, in 1972, to VSS Košice which was playing in the First League of Czechoslovakia and became top scorer in the season 1975–76 with 21 goals.

In that season, he was called to the Czechoslovakia national football team. In the third of his eight national team games, he scored the only goal that he scored with them. He headed the winning goal in Czechoslovakia's 2–1 victory against England for the 1976 UEFA European Football Championship qualifying and helped his team to qualify to the 1976 European Football Championship where he participated and Czechoslovakia became Champions of Europe.

Galis was transferred to Slovan Bratislava in 1977 where he remained until 1981. Then he went to Spain and played for Cádiz CF, but he went back to his country a year later and joined Žilina. In 1982–83 he played for club KSC Hasselt, and returned to Czechoslovakia for a year to play for ZŤS Petržalka before retiring.

== Coaching career ==
Galis began his coaching career in 1990 as a trainer for Slovan Bratislava as a successor of Jozef Jankech, remaining until 1997. In 1992 his team broke the Sparta Prague dominance in Czechoslovak football and won the Czechoslovak Championship. Also in the Slovak League, Slovan won the championship in 1994, 1995 and 1996. In 1994 and 1997 the team won the Slovak Cup.

Galis became coach of Spartak Trnava in 1997, winning the Slovak Cup his first season. At the beginning of 1999, he became coach of Slovakia national team, without however coaching them in a game. He resigned after František Laurinec was elected president of Slovak Football Association. In the summer of 1999, he became coach of the Cypriot team Omonia Nicosia, however in October 1999, he resigned after the team's poor performance.

He managed Artmedia from 2000 until 2002. On 23 November 2003, he became coach of the Slovakia national team. Under his management, Slovakia placed second in the group for qualifications of World Cup 2006, eliminating Russia, but did not qualify to the FIFA World Cup for first time after their elimination in the play-offs by Spain with 5–1 and 1–1. After mutual agreement with the head of Slovak Football Association, František Laurinec, he resigned his position on 12 October 2006.

== Career in politics ==
Since 2006, Galis has been a Member of National Council of the Slovak Republic with the governing-coalition SMER-Social Democracy, a member of the Bratislava Regional VUC government and Government Commissioner for Youth and Sport.

== Honours ==
=== Player ===
VSS Košice

- Slovak Cup: 1973

Czechoslovakia

- UEFA Euro: 1976

=== Manager ===
Slovan Bratislava

- Czechoslovak First League: 1991–92
- Slovak Super Liga: 1993–94, 1994–95, 1995–96
- Slovak Cup: 1993–94
- Slovak Super Cup: 1994

Spartak Trnava

- Slovak Cup: 1997–98
- Slovak Super Cup: 1998

Slovakia

- 2006 FIFA World Cup qualification: Play-off
