= Euro-Atlantic Center =

Slovak non-governmental organization

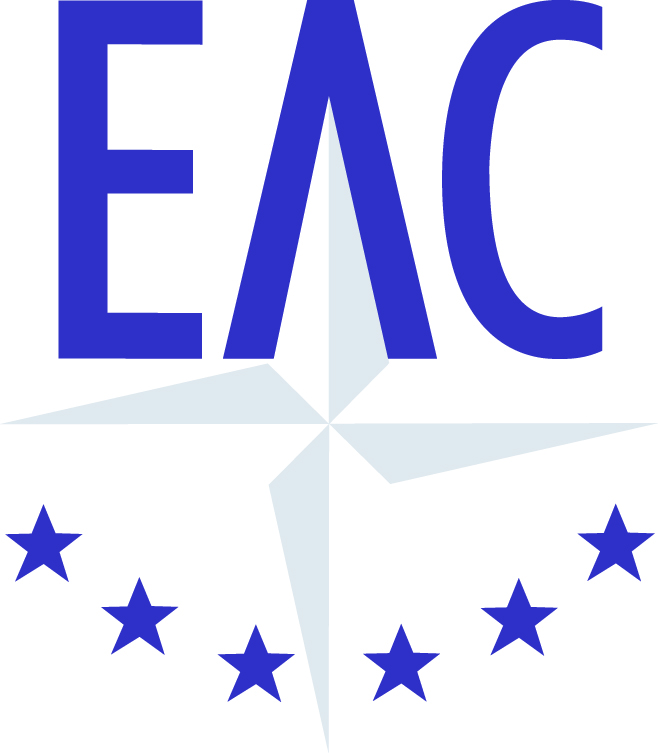
- Abbreviation: EAC
- Established: 1999
- Type: non-governmental organization
- Headquarters: Kuzmányho 3, 974 01 Banská Bystrica, Slovakia
- Website: www.eac.sk

The Euro-Atlantic Center (EAC) is an independent Slovak non-governmental organization uniting young professionals and students active in the field of international relations, Slovak foreign policy and security. The EAC was founded in 1999 by a group of students from Banská Bystrica, Slovakia. The headquarters of the organization is located at the Faculty of Political Science and International Relations of the Matej Bel University in Banská Bystrica. Since 2008, the EAC has also been active at the University of Economics in Bratislava, where the regional bureau is located.

== Aims ==
The EAC has two main goals:

1. Towards its members – to practically prepare students for their future careers by developing their teamwork, managerial, journalistic, analytical and networking skills.
2. Towards the public – inform, educate and raise the awareness of young people and the general public about topics related to international and national security, as well as about international affairs focusing on NATO and the European Union.

== Activities ==
In a 2009 interview with the daily Pravda, EAC vice-president Michal Kovács described its work as public diplomacy, development aid and education on international relations and security policy. He said the organization was funded by the European Commission, the NATO Public Diplomacy Division and the Slovak ministries of foreign affairs and defence. The EAC also worked in the Balkans, and in Ukraine it ran two projects explaining NATO to students and academics and arranged meetings between Ukrainian and Slovak journalists.

The EAC and the University Library in Bratislava organized the 2018 Slovak Security Forum with financial support from the Slovak foreign ministry and the NATO Public Diplomacy Division. Its panels covered 25 years of Slovak foreign and security policy and Slovakia's coming OSCE chairmanship. In February 2024 the EAC and the Faculty of Political Science and International Relations held the 12th Visegrad Youth Forum in Banská Bystrica, with panels and workshops on the Visegrád Group, EU enlargement to the Western Balkans and the European Green Deal.

== Projects ==
- The Slovak Security Forum – the project represents Slovakia's second biggest security conference, which traditionally opens the Slovak diplomatic season. Moreover, it represents one of the main pillars of the dialogue on national security in Slovakia.
- The Visegrad Youth Forum – the project consists of several phases, which culminate in a three-day conference in Banská Bystrica. The entire project is organized and carried out in English with the participation of university students from all V4 member states. During the conference participants take part in a welcoming reception, panel discussions, workshops, full-day simulation and a field trip near Banská Bystrica.
- Speaking Tours – each year, the EAC embarks on a journey to a number of selected Slovak high schools and universities, aiming to bring important topics closer to a broader audience. Each edition of the project focused on a different main topic:
  - 2014 – This is NATO, on the occasion of the 10th anniversary of the entry of the Slovak Republic to NATO
  - 2015 – SK PRESS 2016, the priorities of the Slovak Presidency of the Council of the European Union
  - 2016 – Security challenges, current security challenges
  - 2017 – Priorities of Foreign Policy of the Slovak Republic
  - 2018 – We are NATO, OSCE, EU
  - 2019 – We are NATO, OSCE, EU
- Open Embassy – A series of meetings between students and employees of respective embassies present in Slovakia. Through this visit, they can get information on the country's current foreign policy.
- Current issues / Discussion clubs
- Education is the Future
- #ONTHETABLE
