= Martin Fedor =

Slovak politician (born 1974)

Marin Fedor

Minister of Defence of Slovakia
- In office February 1, 2006 – July 4, 2006
- Preceded by: Juraj Liška
- Succeeded by: František Kašický

Personal details
- Born: March 4, 1974 (age 52) Považská Bystrica, Slovakia
- Party: Slovak Democratic and Christian Union - Democratic Party (2001–2014) #Network (2015–2016); Most–Híd (2016–present)

Martin Fedor is a member of the Slovak National Council who served as Minister of Defence of Slovakia after the resignation of Juraj Liška because of a Slovak Air Force An-24 crash in 2006.

== Early life ==
Martin Fedor was born on March 4, 1974, in Považská Bystrica. He studied international relations at Comenius University in Bratislava from 1992 to 1997. After he received a master's degree in political sciences he continued with more educational activities and work for several private organizations. Martin Fedor is married.

== Political career ==
Martin Fedor joined the Slovak Democratic and Christian Union in 2001 and has been active in politics ever since. He was also a member of Slovak Democratic and Christian Union youth association - New Generation since 2001.

- 1996 - 1998 - personal secretary to Mikuláš Dzurinda
- 1998 - 2000 - head of office of the prime minister
- 2000 - 2002 - director of international relations of Slovak Democratic and Christian Union
- 2002 - 2003 - work at Embassy in Ireland
- 2003 - 2006 - deputy Minister of Defence of Slovakia
- 2006 - Minister of Defence of Slovakia
- 2006 - present - member of Slovak National Council

He left SDKÚ-DS in 2016 and joined Radoslav Procházka's #Network. After receiving only 5.6% votes in the 2016 Slovak parliamentary elections, and secret talks between Procházka and Robert Fico to join the coalition government led by SMER-SD, #Network started to fall apart, and after a few months all the group's MPs had either become independent (going on to form the new party SPOLU) or joined another coalition party, Most-Híd. Fedor joined Most-Híd in 2016 and been a member since then.

== Political party membership ==
- 2001 - 2014 - Slovak Democratic and Christian Union
- 2001 - 2014 - Slovak Democratic and Christian Union youth association - New Generation
- 2015 - 2016 - #Network
- 2016 - present - Most–Híd
