= Faculty of Political Science and International Relations, Matej Bel University =

International relations school of Matej Bel University

Coordinates: 48.7327°N 19.1452°E

Faculty of Political Science and International Relations UMB
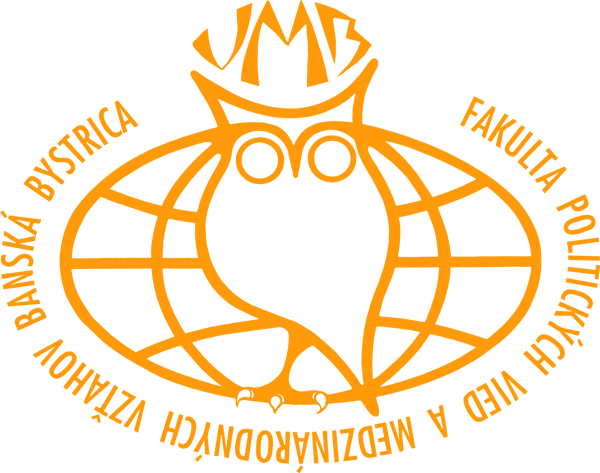
- Motto: Veritate et Legibus
- Type: Public
- Established: 1995
- Parent institution: Matej Bel University
- Dean: Branislav Kováčik
- Academic staff: 43
- Students: 642 (Fall 2019)
- Undergraduates: 384 (Fall 2019)
- Postgraduates: 258 (Fall 2018)
- Location: Banská Bystrica, Slovakia
- Colors: Orange and Black
- Website: fpvmv.umb.sk

The Faculty of Political Science and International Relations at Matej Bel University (commonly referred as FPVMV), (Slovak: Fakulta politických vied a medzinárodných vzťahov Univerzity Mateja Bela v Banskej Bystrici) is the international relations school of Matej Bel University. FPVMV offers bachelor's degrees in International Relations and Political Science and, master's degrees in International relations, Security studies, and Political science and also grants doctoral degrees in International Relations, and Political Science. It conducts research in subjects relating to international affairs, security and government. The faculty is recognized as one of the leading international relations teaching and research institutes in Central Europe.

FPVMV is noted for having an active student body, various organisations founded by students during their studies at FPVMV went on to become major national and international non-governmental organisations active in the field of international relations and security studies. Since 2009 the faculty headquarters the National Center of Excellence for International Security Studies funded through the RD Program of the EU.

FPVMV's alumni and faculty have included multiple ambassadors, diplomats, politicians, and public figures.

== Campus ==
The faculty campus is located in the historical city downtown of Banská Bystrica, bordering the branch office of the National Bank of Slovakia and the Matej Bel University Rector's department. The campus consists of two buildings, which are set in a 4-acre urban park overlooking the river Hron. The main building is a late 19th-century finishing school, which was completely reconstructed in 1995 and 2010. The second building is a late 19th-century headmaster's house, which for many years has been serving as a headquarters for multiple student-run organizations.

== Academics ==
The faculty has had a distinctive international reputation since it was founded in 1995. The faculty's graduates have, on average, one of the largest salaries in the country.

=== Academic departments ===
The faculty consists of the following departments:

- Department of International Relations and Diplomacy

The Department of International Relations and Diplomacy deals with teaching activities related to the following subjects: Diplomacy, Diplomatic and Consular Law, European Studies, Geopolitics of the Slovak Republic, Humanitarian Law, Integration Processes and Basic Principles of European Law, Canadian Studies, etc. The department also offers a doctoral degree program in international relations and diplomacy.

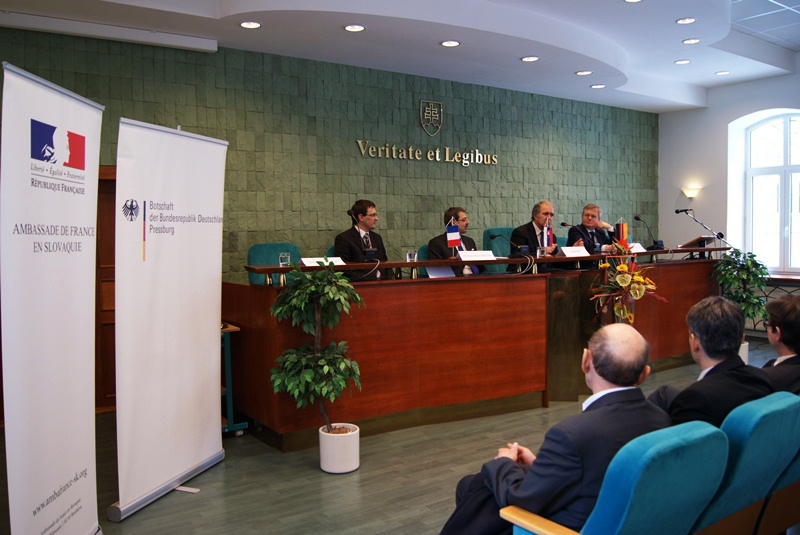
Conference with HE Jean-Marie BRUNO - ambassador of France to Slovakia and HE Axel Hartmann - ambassador of Germany to Slovakia

- Department of Politics

The Department of Politics provides full-time bachelor's and master's programs in "International Relations" and "Political Science" as well as a full-time doctoral program in "Theory of politics".

- Department of Security Studies

The Department of Security Studies was founded in 2007 and focuses on various issues of international and national security. The department hosts the Center of Excellence for International Security Studies and the UMB Data and Society Lab. Since 2017 the department runs a master's program in "Security Studies" and

=== Center of excellence ===
FPVMV headquarters the National Center of Excellence for International Security Studies. The center is funded by the Operational Program for Science and Research of the European Regional Development Fund. Its main goals are to

- Produce cutting-edge academic research by encouraging integrated, multidisciplinary approaches to traditional and emerging challenges to security
- Develop the next generation of academics and practitioners by providing high quality postgraduate education in international security
- Broaden and deepen public understanding of the nexus between interstate conflict, transnational forces and human insecurity
- Produces original and impartial research of (key) modern security issues, and makes this analysis available to policymakers, scholars, journalists, and the public.

The Center of Excellence also houses the UMB Data & Society Lab (UMB DSL), founded in 2018 with financial support from IBM. UMB DSL is the first institute in Slovakia to focus on education, research and policy in the realm of internet and society. The lab is a member institution of the Global Network of Internet and Society Research Centers.

=== Academic publishing ===
The faculty publishes the Politické vedy journal which was run from 1998 to 2000 in cooperation with the Institute of Political Sciences at the Slovak Academy of Sciences, but since 2000 it has been exclusively administrated by the Faculty of Political Science and International Relations.

=== Partnerships ===
As a part of its internationally focused education, it encourages students to add an international component to their studies by living in a foreign country. The school believes that the experience is a key part of an education in international affairs because it increases understanding of the world by providing students with a variety of new and unexpected perspectives. The program functions as bilateral partnerships with a number of schools.

Some of these include University of Bologna in Italy, University of Cologne in Germany, Katholieke Universiteit Leuven in Belgium, Ministry of Foreign Affairs (Serbia) - Diplomatic Academy, Complutense University of Madrid in Spain etc. The faculty constantly looks for new partners and schools are added on a yearly basis.

In 2011, the faculty established the Slovak-French University Institute, in partnership with the French Embassy in Slovakia and two French universities. The institute is headquartered on the school's campus and its main goal is to support scientific cooperation and academic mobility between French and Slovak universities.

== Student life ==
=== Student body ===
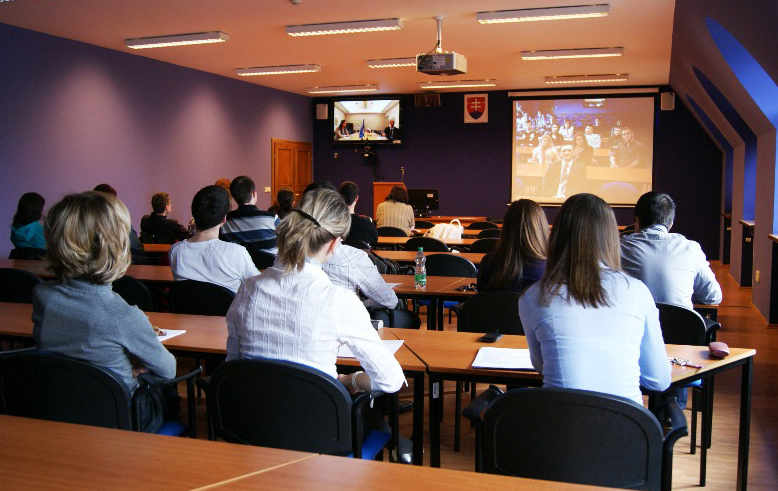
Debating club - Video conference with Ioannis Vrailas, deputy head of the European Union Delegation to the United Nations

There are about 600 full-time students and 40 part-time students at FPVMV. The Faculty is noted for having a very high number of student run organisations. Various organisations founded by students during their studies at FPVMV went on to become major national and international non-governmental organisations active in the field of international relations and security studies. A notable example is Globsec, the organiser of the annual GLOBSEC Forum, and now one of the 50 most influential think-tanks in the world, ranked by the Global Go To Think Tank Index Report at the University of Pennsylvania.

Notable student run organisations currently active at FPVMV are e.g. the Euro-Atlantic Center; Central European Security Alliance; Center of Nations Slovakia, Globsec Academy Center.

=== Greek life ===
The Faculty of Political Science and International Relations of Matej Bel University is home to the Sigma Phi Kappa fraternity. However, there is no "Greek row" on campus, nor is the fraternity formally acknowledged by the faculty. Activities of SPK are wide-ranging and include the organization of sporting events, organizing student parties, participating in fund raising events and more. The Sigma Phi Kappa also publishes a newsletter called PARTA HREJ. SPK's symbol is a platypus, representative colors are yellow and light blue.

== Administration ==
The school is administrated by the Dean's department. The school's scientific and research tasks are however determined by the Scientific Board. The main governing body of the school is the Academic Senate. The faculty's current dean is Associate Professor Branislav Kováčik. The first dean of the faculty was Peter Kulašik, formerly a senior scientist at the Political Science Institute of the Slovak Academy of Sciences.

== Notable alumni ==
- Jaroslav Naď, Minister of Defence of the Slovak Republic
- Martin Klus, State Secretary of the Ministry of Foreign and European Affairs of the Slovak Republic
- Danka Barteková, Olympic Medalist and member of the International Olympic Committee
- Róbert Vass, President of Globsec
- Roman Hlobeň, Slovak Ambassador in Montenegro
- Tomáš Ferko, Slovak Ambassador in Australia
- Ladislav Babčan, Slovak Ambassador in Lithuania
- Róbert Ondrejcsák, Slovak Ambassador in the United Kingdom, previously State Secretary of the Ministry of Defence of the Slovak Republic
- Peter Michaldko, Slovak Ambassador in Greece
- Peter Bátor, Permanent Representative of Slovakia to NATO.
- Natália Šubrtová, Nine time Paralympic Champion
- Ľuboš Blaha, Member of the National Council (Slovakia)
- Ivan Štefunko, Founder and first chairman of the Progressive Slovakia
- Juraj Krúpa, Member of the National Council (Slovakia)
- Monika Beňová, Member of the European Parliament
- Peter Tkačenko, journalist of SME (newspaper)
- Rastislav Kačmár, journalist of Denník N
