= 2006 Slovak Air Force Antonov An-24 crash =

Aviation accident in northern Hungary

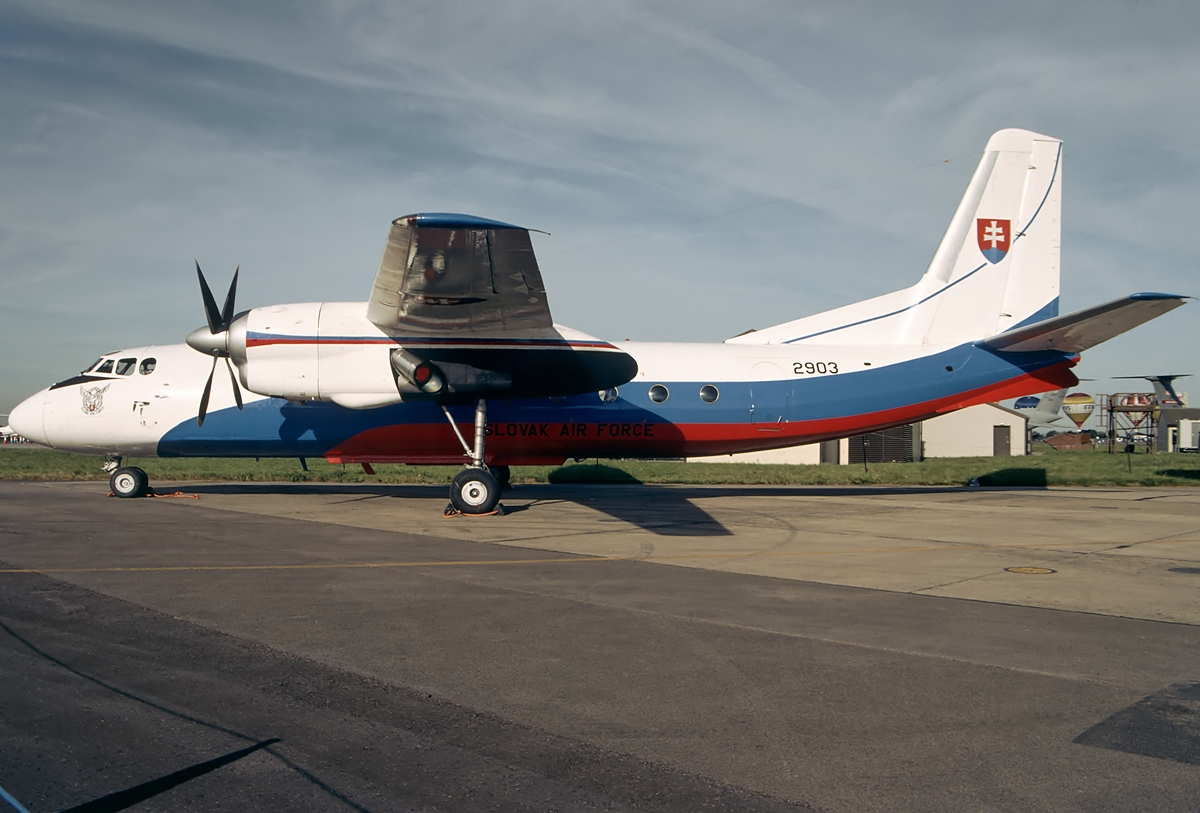
- A Slovakia Air Force An-24 similar to the accident aircraft

Accident
- Date: January 19, 2006
- Summary: Controlled flight into terrain due to pilot error and loss of situational awareness
- Site: Near Hejce, Hungary; 48°26′39″N 21°18′53″E

Aircraft
- Aircraft type: Antonov An-24
- Operator: Slovak Air Force
- Registration: 5605
- Flight origin: Pristina International Airport, Pristina, Kosovo
- Destination: Košice International Airport, Košice, Slovakia
- Occupants: 43
- Passengers: 35
- Crew: 8
- Fatalities: 42
- Injuries: 1
- Survivors: 1

On 19 January 2006, an Antonov An-24 aircraft operated by the Slovak Air Force crashed in northern Hungary, near the village of Hejce and town of Telkibánya. The airplane was carrying Slovak peacekeepers from Kosovo. Of the 43 people on board, only one survived. The crash remains the deadliest in the area of Hungary and the deadliest in Slovak history.

== Background ==
The airplane involved in the crash was an Antonov An-24V, the 50-seat version of the Antonov An-24, a twin turboprop transport aircraft. The aircraft was manufactured on 31 October 1969 in the Soviet Union with the serial number 97305605.

The airplane was carrying Slovak peacekeepers who had finished a six-month tour of duty in NATO's KFOR mission in Kosovo. The airplane was flying from Pristina International Airport in Pristina, Kosovo to Košice International Airport in Košice, Slovakia.

== Crash ==
At around 19:38 CET (18:38 GMT), the aircraft disappeared from air traffic controllers' radar screens. The aircraft crashed in snowy and forested terrain on Borsó Hill at an elevation of 700 meters (2,300 feet) near the Hungarian villages of Hejce and Telkibánya. The crash site is about 20 km (12 mi) from Košice and about 3 km (1.9 mi) from the Slovak border.

According to the Hungarian Disaster Management Agency, the plane hit the tops of trees before catching fire and crashing. Tibor Dobson, of the disaster prevention unit of Hungarian Ministry of the Interior, was quoted as saying that bodies and wreckage were scattered over a large area, and Hungarian police spokesman László Garamvölgyi was quoted as saying that it was −18 °C (0 °F) at the crash site and that the fuselage was completely burnt out.

=== Emergency response ===
Emergency workers who arrived at the scene were tasked not only with looking for survivors, but also with putting out the fire at the crash site. Hungarian authorities reported that the heavily wooded and steep terrain, as well as the low temperatures, contributed to the destruction and hampered rescue efforts. It was also reported that helicopters were unable to land at the crash site. Access was also made difficult because the road leading to the site was covered in snow.

Michaela Farkasova, the wife of the sole surviving passenger, reported that she received a cellular telephone call from her husband, Martin Farkaš, around 19:30 CET (18:30 GMT). She is quoted as saying that her husband had told her that his plane had crashed in a forest. Shortly before the line went dead, he asked her to alert rescue services and the police.

== Sole survivor ==
The sole survivor of the crash was Slovak Army First Lieutenant Martin Farkaš. He suffered minor brain swelling and lung injuries in the crash and was transported to Košice for further treatment afterwards. He was put into a medically induced coma, but he was soon reported to be in a stable condition.

According to rescuers, his survival was pure luck as he was found in the aircraft's lavatory, which received little damage.

== Reactions and aftermath ==
United States Ambassador to Slovakia Rodolphe Vallee released a statement on 30 January expressing his condolences to the families and friends of the victims, to the Slovak Armed Forces, and to the Slovak Republic. Secretary General of NATO Jaap de Hoop Scheffer issued a statement hours after the incident in which he expressed his condolences.

=== Memorials ===
Immediately after the crash, flags were lowered to half-staff and sirens sounded as a tribute to the victims.

On 30 March 2006, the United States Army Major General R. Martin Umbarger, Commanding General for the Indiana Army National Guard, presented a memorial to Slovak Army Major General Peter Gajdoš at a ceremony at the Slovak Ministry of Defense building in Bratislava. On 27 March the memorial travelled to Prešov and on 29 March to Trebišov before returning to Bratislava.

On 18 September 2006, the government of Slovakia allocated 1.5 million koruna from its reserve fund to build a memorial in the Hungarian village of Hejce, near the crash site. The Defence Ministry of Slovakia was able to raise 1.496 million koruna through fundraising. The Slovak Cabinet committed to match public donations and earmarked 1.5 million koruna. The memorial cost around 4.5 million koruna.

On 19 January 2007, the first anniversary of the crash was commemorated by the victims' loved ones, Martin Farkaš and his wife, and the Slovak and Hungarian militaries. Among those attending was Slovak Defence Minister František Kašický, Slovak Army Chief of Staff Ľubomír Bulík, Hungarian Defence State Secretary József Bali, and Hungarian Deputy Army Chief of Staff János Mikita. The attendees laid wreaths and flowers and lit candles at the crash site. Also in the ceremony, Slovak and Hungarian clergy blessed the cornerstone of a monument to the victims that will be near a local church in the Hungarian village of Hejce.

In 2016, at the 10th anniversary, a memorial plaque with the inscripted names of the victims was placed at the Pristina City Park. The unveiling was carried out by the President of Republic of Kosovo Atifete Jahjaga and Deputy Prime Minister and Foreign and European Affairs Minister of the Republic of Slovakia Miroslav Lajčák.

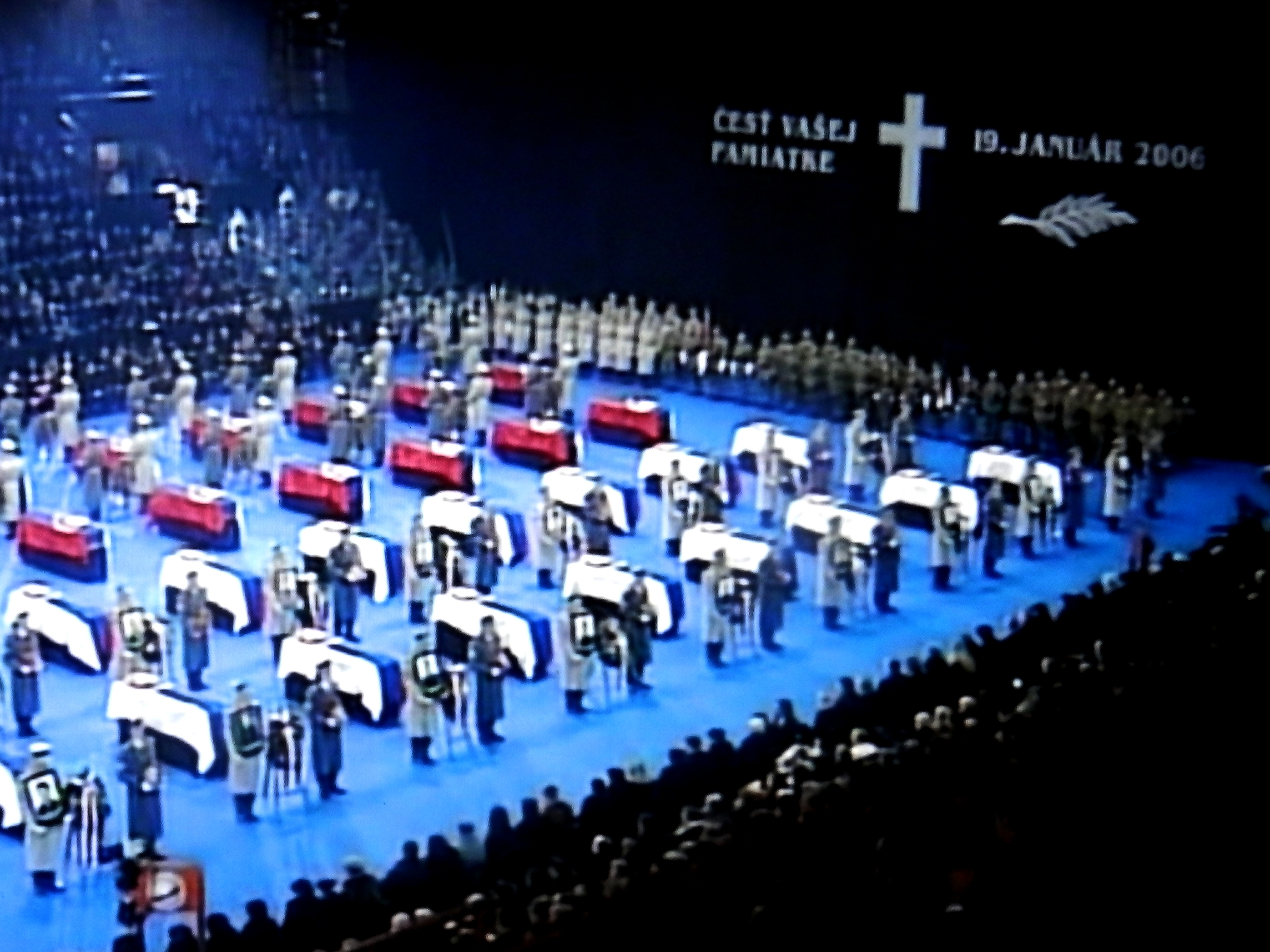
State memorial service in Prešov City Sport Hall, 26 January 2006.

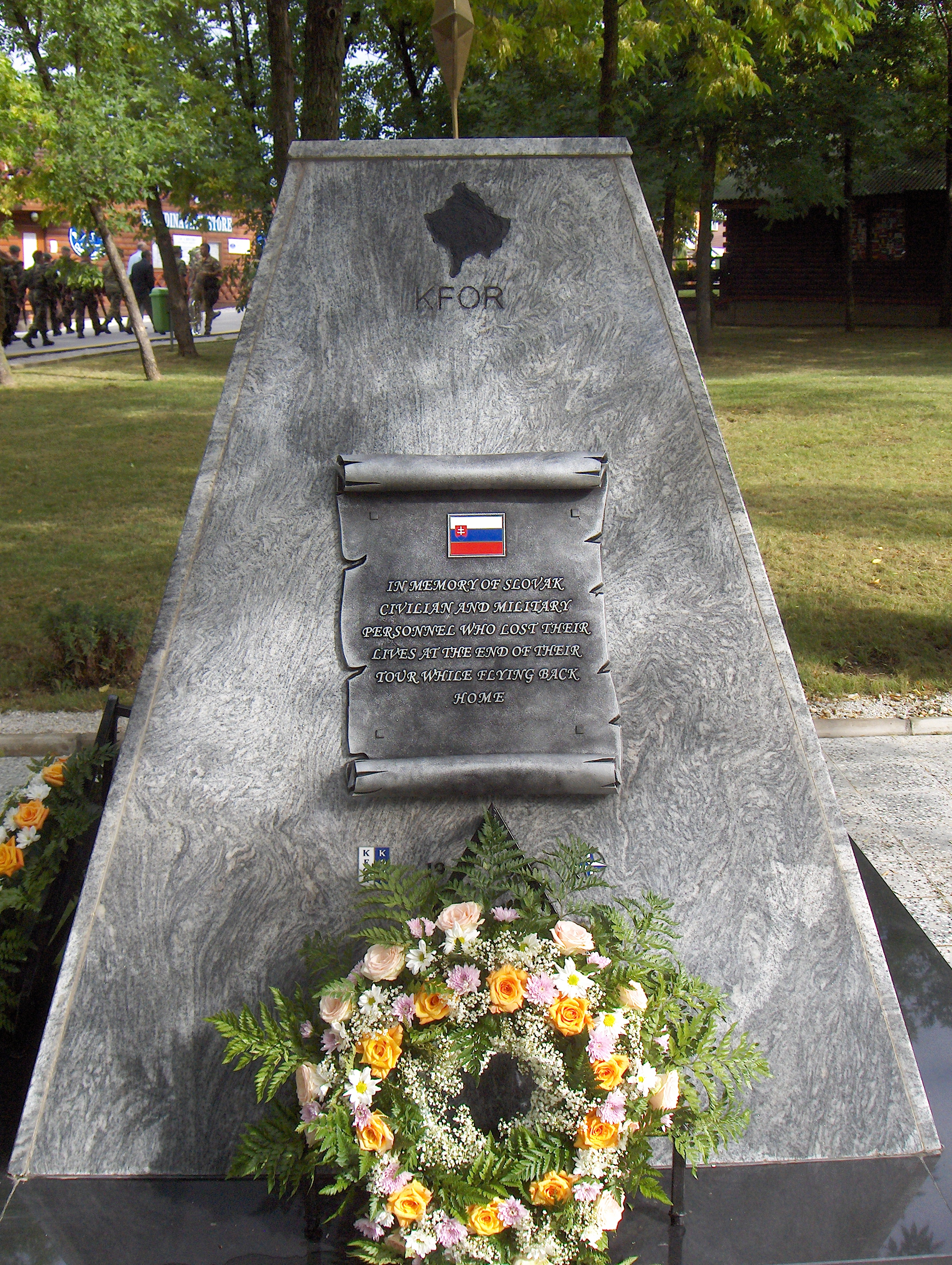
Memorial to the victims of the crash commissioned by the KFOR

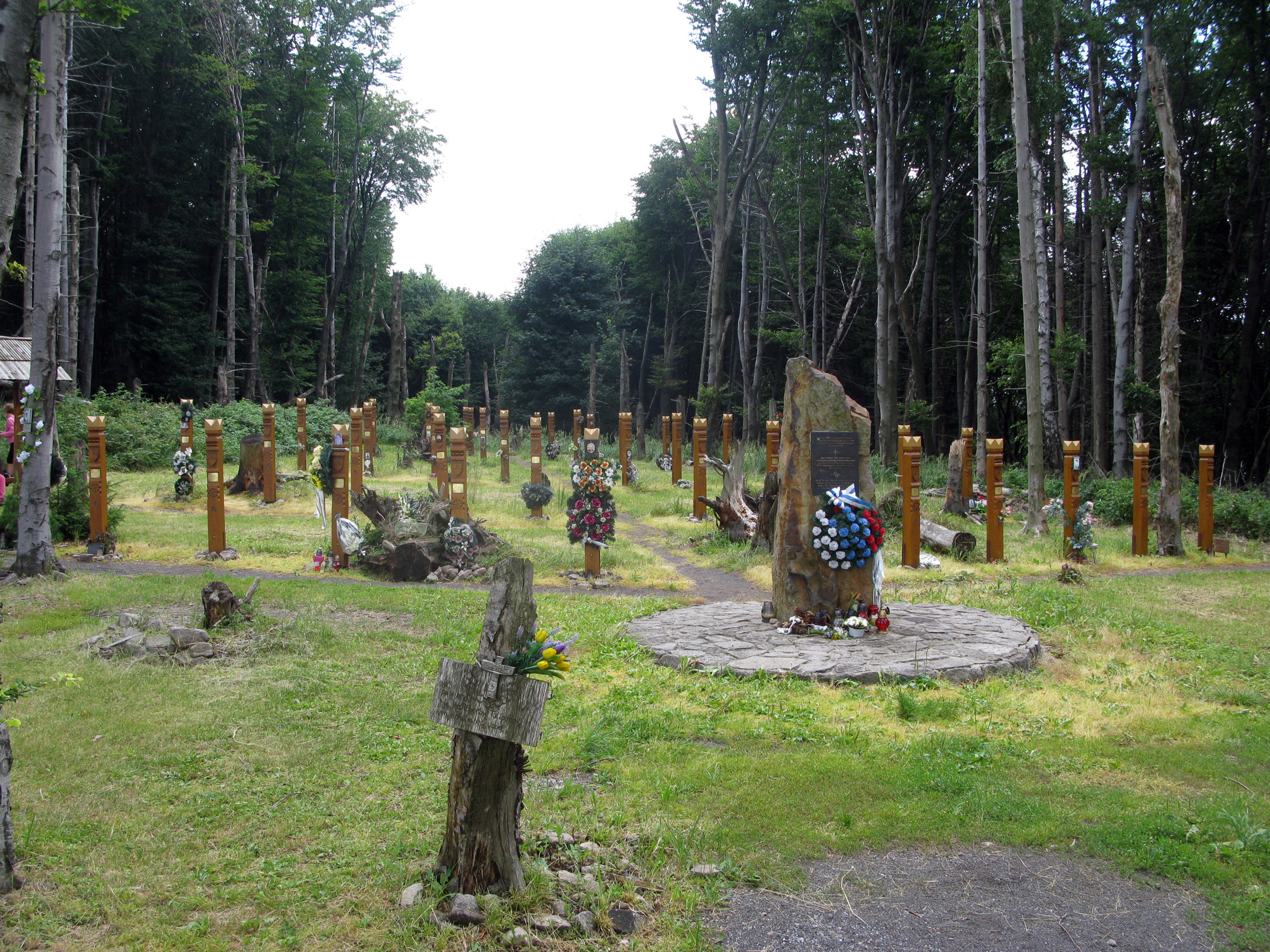
Memorial to the victims on the Borsó Hill

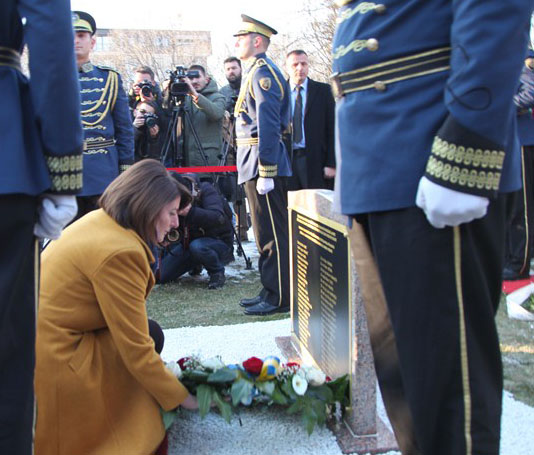
Republic of Kosovo President Jahjaga lays wreath in honor of Slovak KFOR soldiers at the memorial in the Prishtina Central Park

== Investigation ==
According to Tibor Dobson of the disaster prevention unit of Hungarian Ministry of the Interior, the aircraft had strayed 3 km (1.9 mi) off the flight path outlined in the flight plan after Slovak air traffic controllers had taken over the flight from Hungarian controllers.

The investigation indicates that the pilot descended too early in the dark towards the lights of Košice.

== See also ==
- List of sole survivors of aviation accidents and incidents
