= František Laurinec =

Slovak football administrator (born 1951)

- Born: 19 August 1951 (age 75); Veľké Uherce
- Occupation: Lawyer
- Known for: Member of the UEFA Executive Committee
- Title: President of the Slovak Football Association
- Term: 1999–2010

František Laurinec (born 19 August 1951) is a football administrator who is a member of the UEFA Executive Committee. He is a former president of Slovak Football Association (SFZ).

== Biography ==
Laurinec was born in Veľké Uherce. He played football for Iskra Partizánske.

From 1984 to 1990 he was a docent in Vysoká škola (higher school) of the Sbor národní bezpečnosti in Bratislava.

Later Laurinec worked in Czechoslovak Football Association (1989–93), Slovak Football Association (1994–98) and football club Inter Bratislava. From 1999 until 2010 he was president of SFZ.

In 2009 Laurinec became a member of the UEFA Executive Committee.

== Criticism ==
Interviews of several former football players and referees on corruption in Slovak football have caused a great deal of criticism towards Laurinec.

From 1982 to 1989 - The companion Kommunist party Slovakia.
