= 2013–14 EUHL season =

- League: EUHL
- Sport: Ice hockey
- Duration: November 6, 2013 –
- Number of games: 10
- Number of teams: 6

Regular season
- Regular Season Winners: UK Praha
- Top scorer: Marek Marušiak (Paneuropa Kings) 16 goals

Play-offs
- Finals champions: UK Praha
- Runners-up: Paneuropa Kings

The 2013–14 EUHL season was the first season of European University Hockey League featuring five teams from Slovakia and the Czech Republic.

== Regular season ==
The regular season will be played in a conventional one home-one away round-robin schedule. The best four teams will advance to Play-off.

=== Table ===
#	Team	Pld	W	D	L	GF	GA	GD	Pts
1.	(Czech Republic) UK Praha	10	8	2	0	65	28	+37	18
2.	(Slovakia) Paneuropa Kings	10	5	1	4	49	43	+6	11
3.	(Czech Republic) UTB Zlín	10	5	0	5	44	45	–1	10
4.	(Slovakia) CityU Gladiators	10	3	3	4	34	39	–5	9
5.	(Slovakia) VŠEMvs Managers	10	3	1	6	37	52	–15	7
6.	(Slovakia) STU Engineers	10	2	1	7	24	46	–22	5

Team advances to Play-off Team cannot advance to Play-off

=== Matches ===
November 6, 2013; 19:00	(Czech Republic) UTB Zlín	5 – 8 (1–1, 1–3, 3–4)	(Slovakia) CityU Gladiators Trenčín	Zimní stadion Luďka Čajky; Attendance: 1,500

Game reference

November 11, 2013; 17:00	(Slovakia) STU Engineers	6 – 5 (2–1, 1–3, 3–1)	(Slovakia) Paneuropa Kings	Zimný štadión Vladimíra Dzurillu; Attendance: 165

Game reference

November 11, 2013; 18:00	(Czech Republic) UK Praha	8 – 1 (4–1, 2–0, 2–0)	(Slovakia) CityU Gladiators Trenčín	Zimní stadion Slaný

Game reference

November 13, 2013; 19:00	(Czech Republic) UTB Zlín	2 – 3 (0–1, 1–1, 1–1)	(Slovakia) Paneuropa Kings	Zimní stadion Luďka Čajky

Game reference

November 18, 2013; 17:00	(Slovakia) STU Engineers	1 – 4 (0–1, 0–1, 1–2)	(Slovakia) VŠEMvs Managers	Zimný štadión Vladimíra Dzurillu; Attendance: 350

Game reference

November 19, 2013; 18:00	(Czech Republic) UK Praha	4 – 3 (1–2, 2–0, 1–1)	(Czech Republic) UTB Zlín	Zimní stadion Slaný

Game reference

November 20, 2013; 19:00	(Slovakia) CityU Gladiators Trenčín	5 – 4 (0–2, 3–0, 2–2)	(Slovakia) Paneuropa Kings	Zimný štadión Pavla Demitru

Game reference

November 25, 2013; 19:00	(Slovakia) CityU Gladiators Trenčín	3 – 0 (0–0, 2–0, 1–0)	(Slovakia) STU Engineers	Zimný štadión Pavla Demitru

Game reference

November 26, 2013; 17:00	(Slovakia) Paneuropa Kings	2 – 5 (1–1, 1–3, 0–1)	(Czech Republic) UK Praha	Zimný štadión Vladimíra Dzurillu; Attendance: 174

Game reference

December 2, 2013; 18:00	(Czech Republic) UK Praha	4 – 4 (2–1, 1–3, 1–0)	(Slovakia) Paneuropa Kings	Zimní stadion Slaný

Game reference

December 2, 2013; 18:45	(Slovakia) STU Engineers	2 – 2 (0–1, 1–0, 1–1)	(Slovakia) CityU Gladiators Trenčín	Zimný štadión Vladimíra Dzurillu; Attendance: 195

Game reference

December 3, 2013; 18:00	(Czech Republic) UK Praha	7 – 3 (1–1, 3–0, 3–1)	(Slovakia) VŠEMvs Managers	Zimní stadion Slaný

Game reference

December 4, 2013; 19:00	(Czech Republic) UTB Zlín	4 – 0 (0–0, 4–0, 0–0)	(Slovakia) VŠEMvs Managers	Zimní stadion Luďka Čajky

Game reference

December 9, 2013; 18:45	(Slovakia) VŠEMvs Managers	1 – 3 (0–1, 0–1, 1–1)	(Slovakia) STU Engineers	Zimný štadión Vladimíra Dzurillu

Game reference

December 11, 2013; 19:00	(Slovakia) CityU Gladiators Trenčín	4 – 4 (0–1, 1–3, 3–0)	(Slovakia) VŠEMvs Managers	Zimný štadión Pavla Demitru

Game reference

December 16, 2013; 17:15	(Slovakia) STU Engineers	2 – 5 (1–1, 1–4, 0–0)	(Slovakia) Paneuropa Kings	Zimný štadión Vladimíra Dzurillu; Attendance: 249

Game reference

February 3, 2014; 17:15	(Slovakia) STU Engineers	2 – 7 (0–3, 0–3, 2–1)	(Czech Republic) UK Praha	Zimný štadión Vladimíra Dzurillu

Game reference

February 3, 2014; 19:15	(Slovakia) CityU Gladiators Trenčín	4 – 6 (3–3, 1–1, 0–2)	(Czech Republic) UTB Zlín	Zimný štadión Pavla Demitru; Attendance: 150

Game reference

February 10, 2014; 17:00	(Slovakia) Paneuropa Kings	9 – 4 (3–2, 4–1, 2–1)	(Czech Republic) UTB Zlín	Zimný štadión Vladimíra Dzurillu

Game reference

February 12, 2014; 20:00	(Slovakia) CityU Gladiators Trenčín	2 – 2 (1–0, 1–2, 0–0)	(Czech Republic) UK Praha	Zimný štadión Pavla Demitru

Game reference

February 17, 2014; 18:00	(Czech Republic) UK Praha	9 – 2 (2–0, 2–1, 5–1)	(Slovakia) STU Engineers	Zimní stadion Slaný

Game reference

February 17, 2014; 17:00	(Slovakia) Paneuropa Kings	5 – 3 (2–2, 1–0, 2–1)	(Slovakia) CityU Gladiators Trenčín	Zimný štadión Vladimíra Dzurillu

Game reference

February 18, 2014; 17:00	(Czech Republic) UTB Zlín	5 – 3 (1–1, 1–1, 3–1)	(Slovakia) STU Engineers	Zimní stadion Luďka Čajky

Game reference

February 24, 2014; 17:25	(Slovakia) Paneuropa Kings	6 – 4 (0–0, 3–1, 3–3)	(Slovakia) VŠEMvs Managers	Zimný štadión Vladimíra Dzurillu

Game reference

March 3, 2014; 17:15	(Slovakia) STU Engineers	3 – 5 (1–2, 2–1, 0–2)	(Czech Republic) UTB Zlín	Zimný štadión Vladimíra Dzurillu

Game reference

March 10, 2014; 17:20	(Slovakia) VŠEMvs Managers	5 – 13 (0–1, 1–5, 4–7)	(Czech Republic) UK Praha	Zimný štadión Vladimíra Dzurillu

Game reference

March 11, 2014; 17:00	(Czech Republic) UTB Zlín	4 – 6 (3–3, 1–1, 0–2)	(Czech Republic) UK Praha	Zimní stadion Luďka Čajky

Game reference

March 17, 2014; 17:20	(Slovakia) VŠEMvs Managers	3 – 2 (2–0, 1–2, 0–0)	(Slovakia) CityU Gladiators Trenčín	Zimný štadión Vladimíra Dzurillu

Game reference

March 24, 2014; 17:20	(Slovakia) VŠEMvs Managers	5 – 6 (1–1, 2–3, 2–2)	(Czech Republic) UTB Zlín	Zimný štadión Vladimíra Dzurillu

Game reference

March 31, 2014; 17:20	(Slovakia) VŠEMvs Managers	8 – 6 (0–2, 7–1, 1–3)	(Slovakia) Paneuropa Kings	Zimný štadión Vladimíra Dzurillu

Game reference

== Play-offs ==
Semifinals
1.	UK Praha	8	7	–	2
4.	CityU Gladiators	1	1	–	0
2.	Paneuropa Kings	3	6	5	2
3.	UTB Zlín	4	3	4	1

Finals
1.	UK Praha	3	6	–	2
2.	Paneuropa Kings	2	4	–	0

== Exhibition game ==
Exhibition Game
	1	2	3	Total
(Slovakia) (Czech Republic) EUHL All-stars	2	1	0	3
(United States) ACHA Division 2 Selects	1	1	0	2
- Date: 5 January 2013
- Arena: Ondrej Nepela Arena
- City: Bratislava, Slovakia
- Attendance: 1,127

On January 5, 2014, the EUHL all-star team played in an exhibition game against American Collegiate Hockey Association Division 2 all-stars team in Ondrej Nepela Arena in Bratislava, Slovakia.
