= Adriana Kučerová =

Slovak operatic soprano (born 1976)

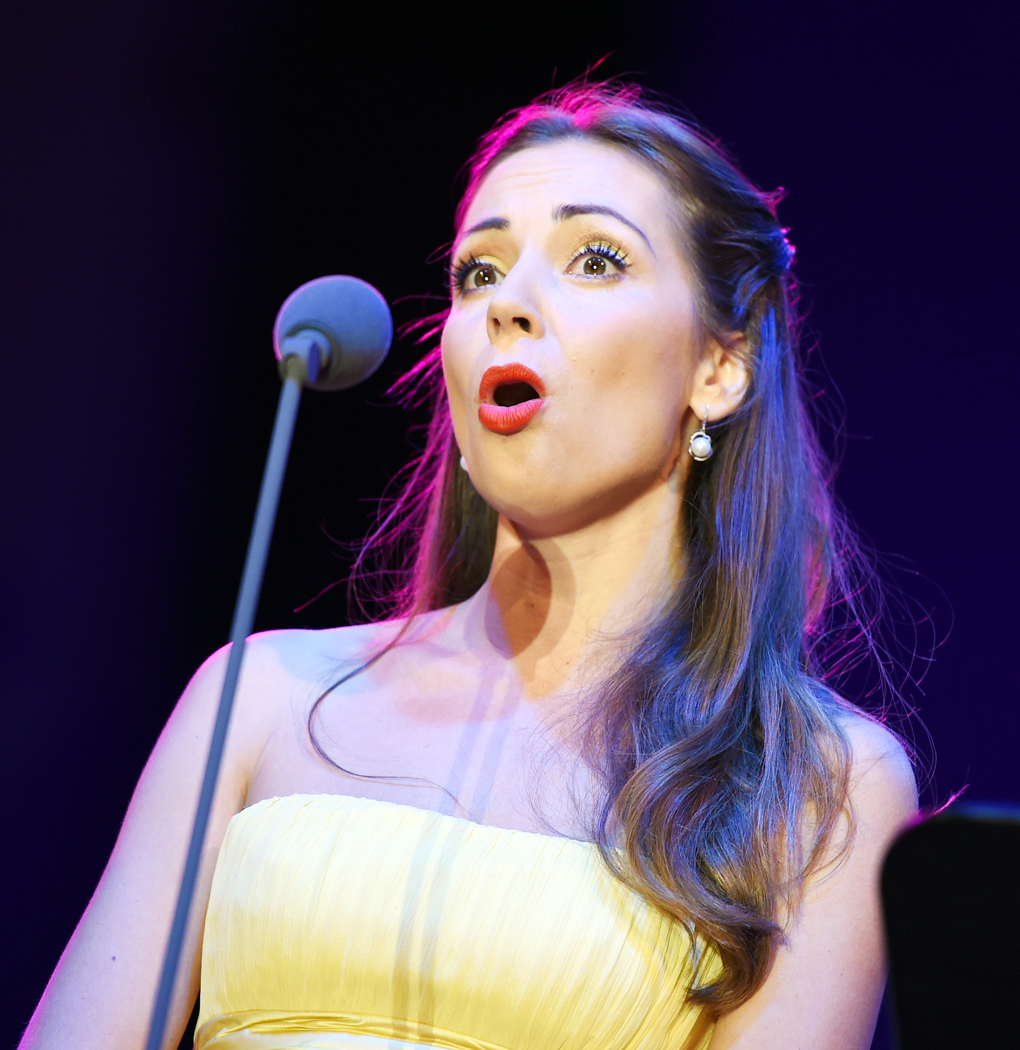
- Kučerová in 2015

Background information
- Born: 24 February 1976 (age 50); Lučenec, Czechoslovakia
- Genres: Classical
- Occupation: Opera singer
- Instrument: Vocals

Adriana Kučerová (born 24 February 1976) is a Slovak operatic soprano.

When she was 22 years old and almost finished with her university studies, she decided to go into a music career. Frank Kuznik of The Prague Post wrote, "To say that Adriana Kučerová came late to singing would be like saying that Mozart was just another composer". She had originally studied at Matej Bel University, working towards an education degree. Frank Kuznik said that she "chang[ed] her mind literally at the last minute." A teacher at the university's music school recommended that she attend a conservatory in Bratislava. Kučerová attended the Academy of Performing Arts in Bratislava (VŠMU) and the Conservatoire Supérieur de musique et de danse de Lyon in France.

In 2001, she won the European Music Prize for Youth in Hamburg, Germany, and a year later, she was awarded at the International Summer Academy Prague-Vienna-Budapest. In 2005, at the Gabor Belvedere singing competition in Vienna, Austria, she won the first prize and the special audience prize. At the time, Kuznik wrote that, since then, she "has been in demand on stages throughout Europe".

Kučerová joined the Slovak National Theatre after finishing her university studies.
