= Hejce =

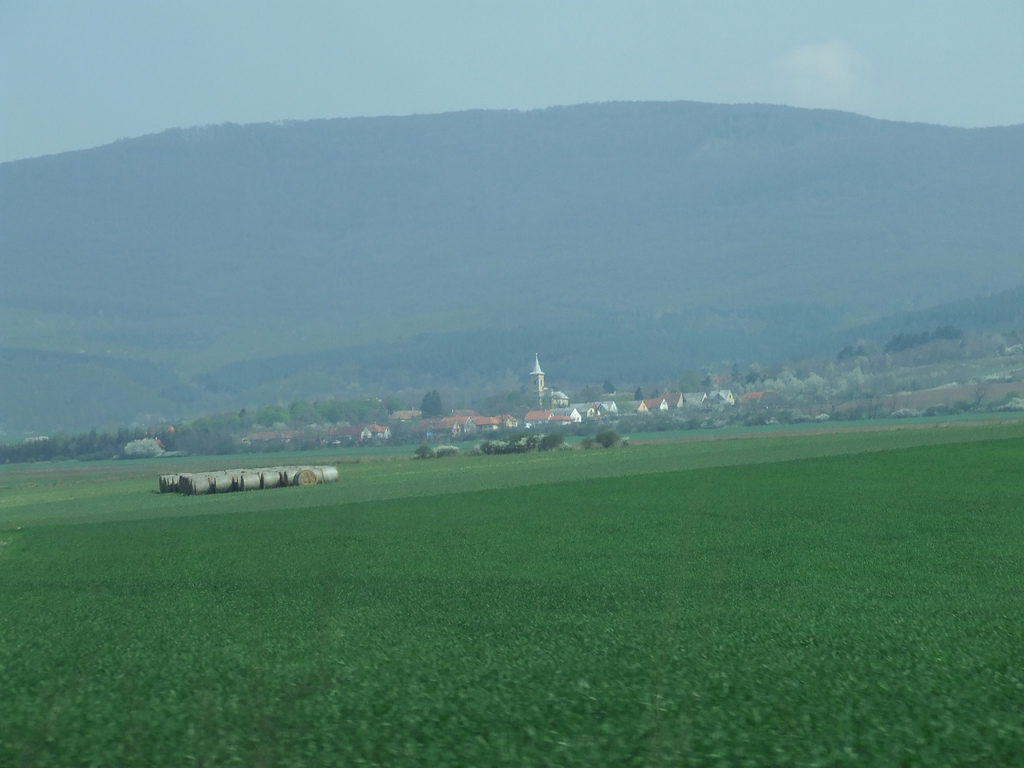

- Flag Coat of arms

- Location of Hejce
- Coordinates: 48.42452°N 21.28114°E
- Country: Hungary
- County: Borsod-Abaúj-Zemplén

Area
  - Total: 9.52 km^{2} (3.68 sq mi)

Population (2004)
  - Total: 310
  - Density: 32.56/km^{2} (84.3/sq mi)
- Time zone: UTC+1 (CET)
  - Summer (DST): UTC+2 (CEST)
- Postal code: 3892
- Area code: 46

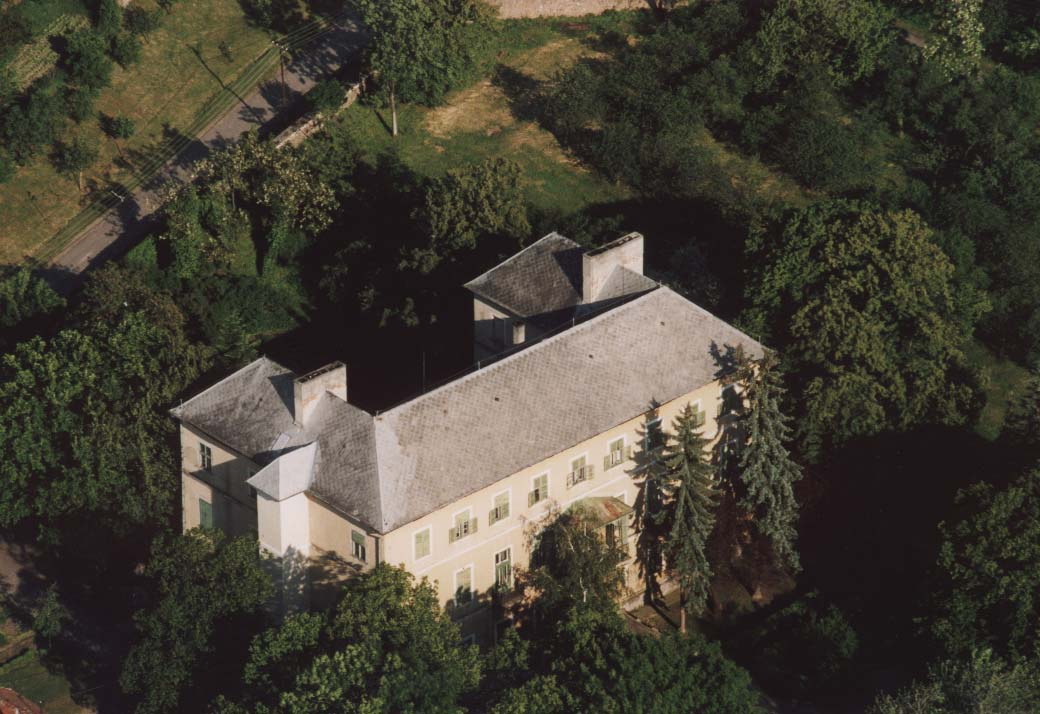
Aerial photography: The palace of Hejce

Hejce is a village in Borsod-Abaúj-Zemplén county, Hungary. It is one of the oldest settlements in Hungary, mentioned in records from 1009, when king Stephen I granted it to the episcopate of Eger. Its viniculture was already known around 1600. Count Károly Eszterházy built a palace there in the 18th century.

Hejce is remembered for the tragedy of a Slovak AN-24 military aircraft which crashed there on January 19, 2006. The plane was carrying Slovak peacekeeping troops from Pristina in Kosovo to Košice in Slovakia. Only one of the 43 soldiers survived. The Slovak minister of defence honoured the inhabitants of the village for their selfless help in the rescue operations.
