= Jaroslav Naď =

Slovak politician

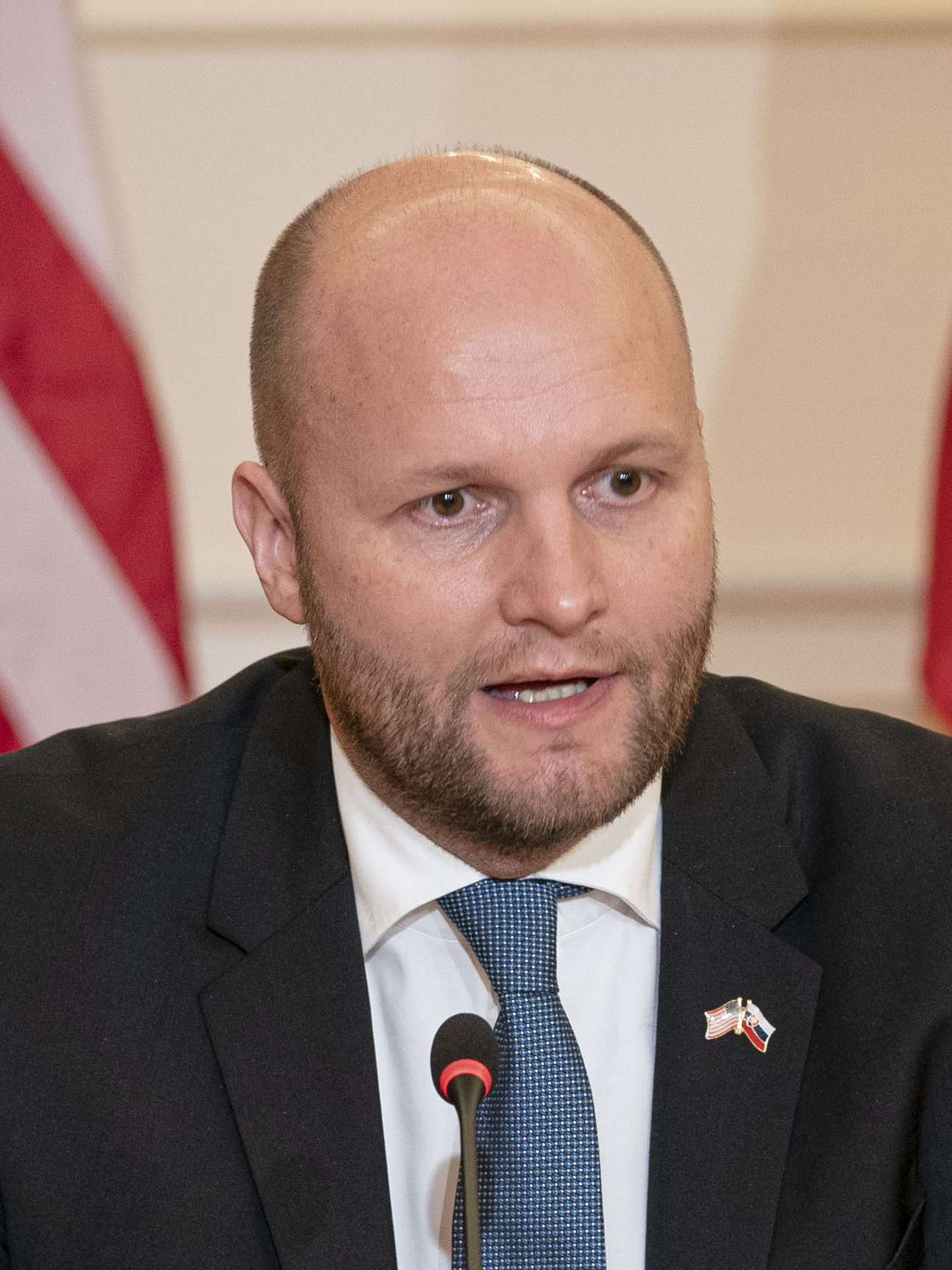

Minister of Defence
- In office 21 March 2020 – 15 May 2023
- Prime Minister: Igor Matovič; Eduard Heger
- Preceded by: Peter Gajdoš
- Succeeded by: Martin Sklenár

Member of the National Council
- In office 15 May 2023 – 25 October 2023

Leader of the Democrats
- Incumbent
- Assumed office 2 December 2023
- Deputy: List: Eduard Heger; Andrea Letanovská; František Oľha; Juraj Šeliga
- Preceded by: Eduard Heger

Personal details
- Born: 21 March 1981 (age 45) Nitra, Czechoslovakia (now Slovakia)
- Party: Democrats (2023–present)
- Other political affiliations: Direction (2000–2002); Ordinary People and Independent Personalities (2018–2023)
- Spouse: Katarína Beláková (divorced)
- Children: 3
- Education: Armed Forces Academy; Matej Bel University

Jaroslav Naď (born 21 March 1981) is a Slovak politician who served as Minister of Defence between March 2020 and May 2023, as a nominee of OĽaNO. He specialises in national security issues and previously worked with Globsec. Naď currently serves as a deputy chairman of the Democrats.

== Early life and education ==
Naď grew up in Banská Štiavnica and settled in the village of Hrubá Borša near Senec. He has a brother named René and is the brother-in-law of Anton Tretinár.

Naď majored in political science at Matej Bel University in Banská Bystrica in 2007 and received further training at the European Security and Defence College in Brussels. In 2018, he obtained his PhD from the Armed Forces Academy of General Milan Rastislav Štefánik.

== Career ==
During his university studies, from 2002 to 2004, he was active in the non-governmental organization Slovak Foreign Policy Association (SFPA). After graduating, from 2004 to 2013, he worked at the Ministry of Defence of the Slovak Republic in various positions.

From 2012 to 2013, he served as a diplomat - Head of the Defense Section at the Permanent Delegation of Slovakia to NATO and at the Permanent Representation of Slovakia to the European Union.

From 2014 to 2015, he worked as deputy director of the non-governmental organization Globsec.

From 2016 to 2018, he was a founder and worked as a director at the non-governmental organization Slovak Security Policy Institute (SSPI).

From 2014 to 2018, he served as the managing director of the company CYPHER, s.r.o.

== Political career ==
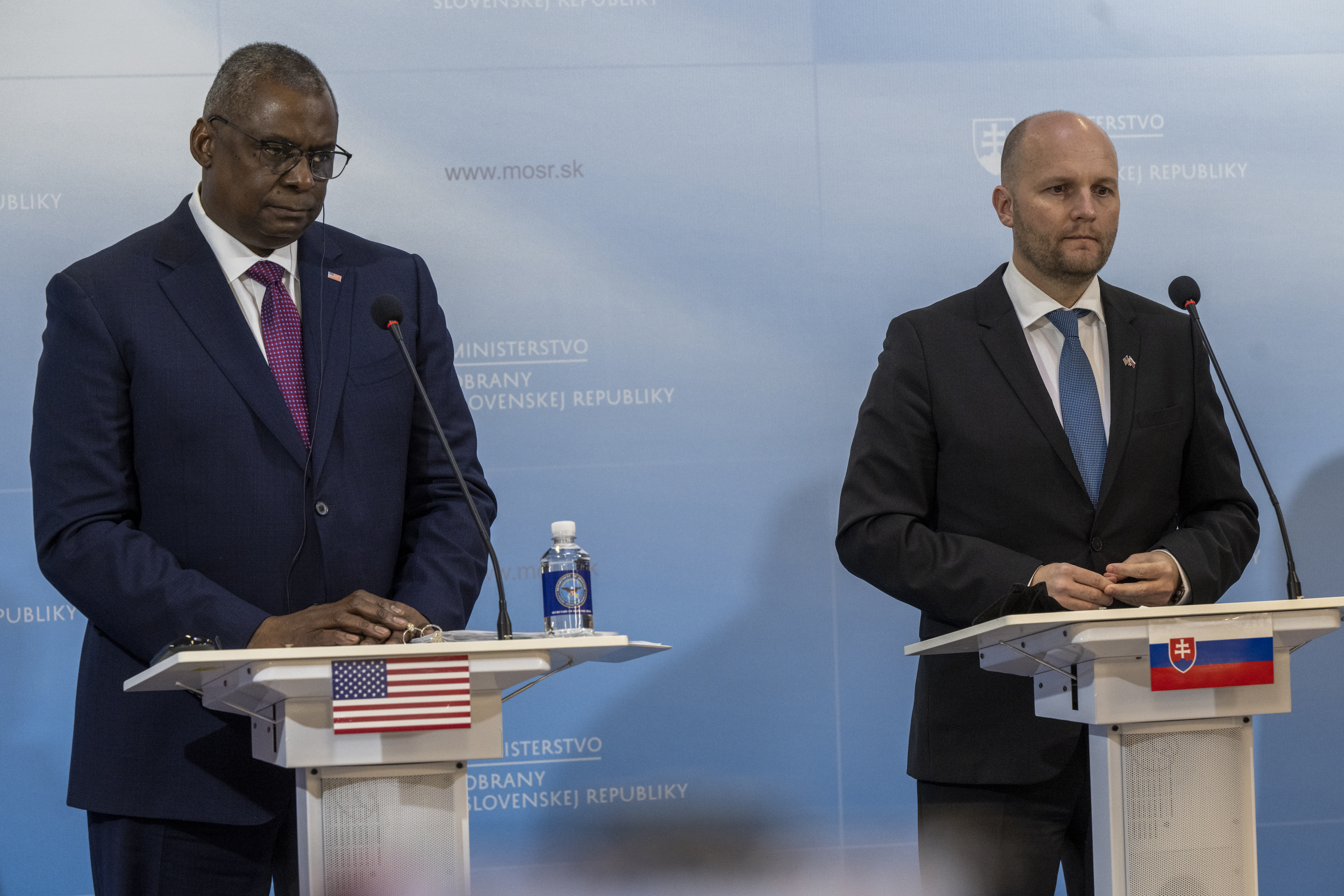
Naď at a press conference with the US Secretary of Defense Lloyd Austin in March 2022 in Bratislava.

Naď joined Direction – Social Democracy in 2000, but was expelled from the party after paying membership fees. In a 2023 interview with the conspiracy media outlet Štandard, Robert Fico claimed that Naď had requested a political position from him, and that after being denied, he left the party.

At the end of 2018, Naď joined the political party Ordinary People and Independent Personalities (OĽaNO) led by Igor Matovič.

During the parliamentary elections in February 2020, in which Naď ran for the OĽANO movement, he won 101,819 preferential votes.

=== Minister of Defence (2020-2023) ===
After the electoral victory of OĽANO, Naď became the Minister of Defence.

In April 2020, Naď announced the cancellation of the ongoing tender for the purchase of 4x4 armored vehicles for the Slovak Armed Forces and would suspend the same tender for 8x8 vehicles.

Robert Fico and his party (Smer-SD) have repeatedly accused Naď of treason or sabotage related to Slovakia's 2022 donation of the S-300 air defense system to Ukraine. Fico's government (since 2023) and the Defense Ministry filed criminal complaints against Naď and others involved. Similar complaints targeted the later donation of MiG-29 jets. Prosecutors investigated these cases but found no criminal offense.

=== Democrats party ===
In early 2023, then‑Prime Minister Eduard Heger played a key role in creating a new political formation under the Democrats name alongside his former ministers including Naď and former Foreign Minister Rastislav Káčer, after splitting from the OĽaNO movement.

Beginning with March 2023, he serves as a deputy chairman of the Democrats party.

=== Post-Minister of Defence ===
Beginning with 1 November 2023, Naď works as an advisor to the Minister of Defense of the Czech Republic, Jana Černochová.

== Personal life ==
Naď is trilingual, able to speak English and German apart from his native Slovak. He plays football in his spare time.

Naď is divorced with three children: two from his previous marriage with Katarína Baláková, and one from his partner, journalist Barbara Túrosová. He also owns a luxury apartment in Banská Štiavnica.

== Controversy ==
Naď was linked with accusations of nepotism when his former partner Barbara Túrosová was assigned spokeswoman of the Ministry of Interior. She denied the allegations, referring to her long-term journalism career in TA3. Naď was previously linked with nepotism back in 2014, when his brother René was appointed as the Permanent Representation of the Slovak Republic to NATO in Brussels, while Naď was one of the officers at the Ministry of Defence. No verdicts were declared in either of the cases.

During his time in government, Naď was among the advocates of purchasing the Russian vaccine Sputnik V. The purchase was accompanied by doubts and triggered a coalition crisis. Security and foreign policy experts warned that it represented a tool of Russian influence operations, and the majority of European Union member states rejected the vaccine. Despite being aware of this, Naď continued to defend the purchase of the vaccine. In an interview with the daily SME published on 4 March 2021, he stated for example:

“Had we waited until the EMA (European Medicines Agency) made the decision it made today, we would not have signed the contract by now, because the vaccines would already have been in other countries. Soon you will hear standard European Union countries, long-standing members, announcing one by one that they have concluded contracts for Sputnik.”
