= Martin Sklenár =

Slovak civil servant

Minister of Defence
- In office 15 May – 25 October 2023
- Prime Minister: Ľudovít Ódor
- Preceded by: Jaroslav Naď
- Succeeded by: Robert Kaliňák

Personal details
- Born: 15 July 1980 (age 46) Slovakia
- Education: Matej Bel University

Martin Sklenár (born 15 July 1980) is a Slovak civil servant who served as minister of defence of Slovakia from May until October 2023.

== Early life and education ==
Sklenár graduated from Matej Bel University in 2003, studying international relations. Following his graduation, he worked for the ministries of Defence and International Affairs as well as for Slovak embassies to the US, European Union, and NATO. Sklenár met predecessor Naď from then on, who worked as a minister until 2023.

== Political career ==
In May 2023, President Zuzana Čaputová appointed Sklenár as the Minister of Defence in the technocratic government of Ľudovít Ódor.

In an interview with Pravda, Sklenár stated that he received surprising questions regarding the Russian invasion of Ukraine, to why it is perceived negatively in Slovakia.
