= František Kašický =

Slovak politician

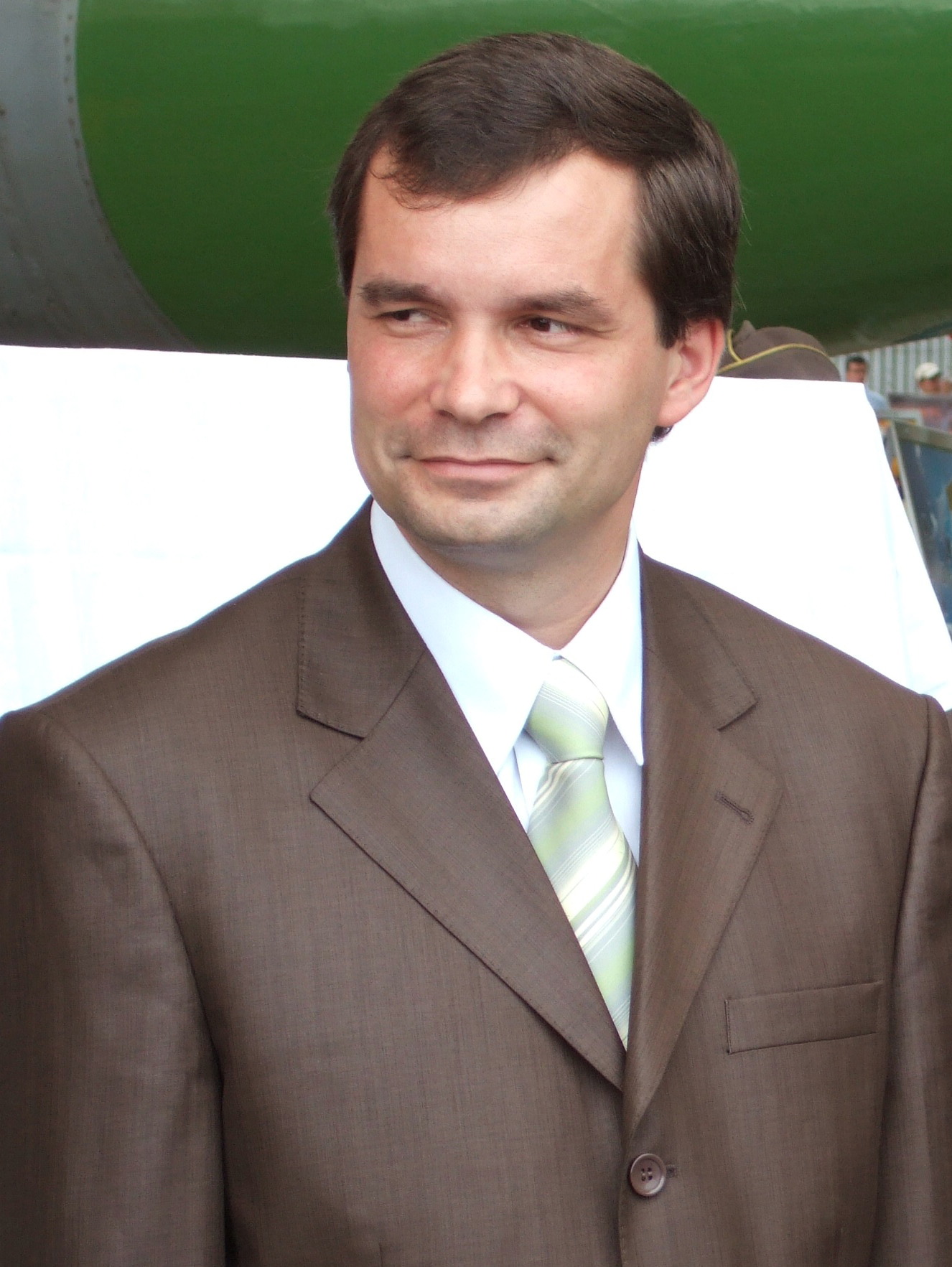

Minister of Defence
- In office 4 July 2006 – 30 January 2008
- Preceded by: Martin Fedor
- Succeeded by: Jaroslav Baška

Mayor of Častá
- Incumbent
- Assumed office 2022
- Preceded by: Robert Lederleitner

Personal details
- Born: 18 November 1968 (age 57) Gelnica, Czechoslovakia (now Slovakia)

František Kašický (born 18 November 1968 in Gelnica, Czechoslovakia) is a former a defence minister of Slovakia who served from 4 July 2006 to 30 January 2008.

Kašický is a former chief of the office of the Minister of Defence, director of the Communications Department, and ministry spokesman. Between 2003 and 2004, Kašický was a director of Military Defence Intelligence at the Ministry of Defence.

After it was found that the Slovak ministry of defence had accepted overpriced contracts for various services, such as cleaning, Kašický resigned on 30 January 2008.

Kašický was the Slovak ambassador to Norway and Iceland from 2013 to 2017.

As of 2026, he is a mayor of Častá, a municipality in Western Slovakia.
