= Ministry of Defence (Slovakia) =

Government ministry of Slovakia

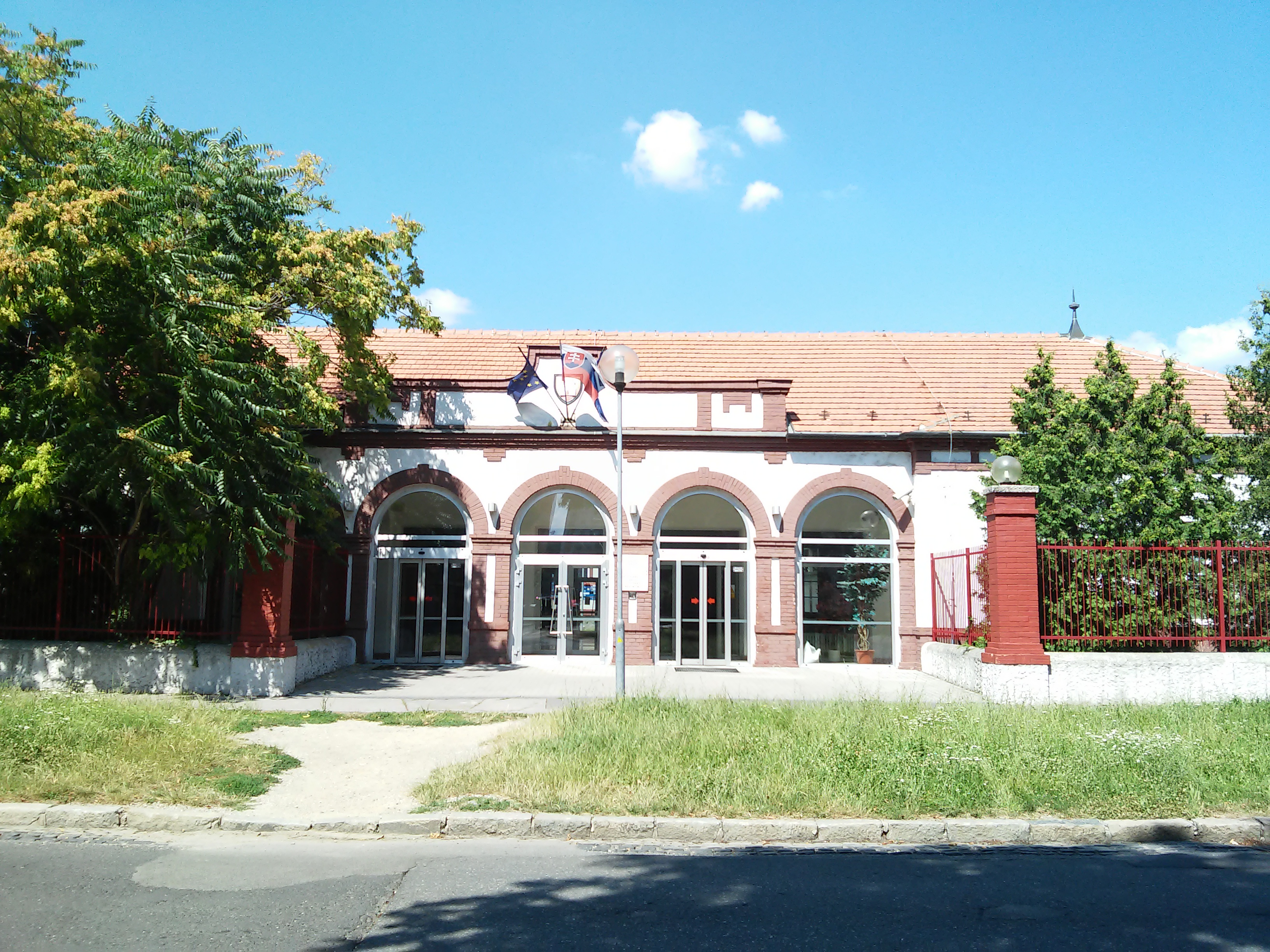
Building of Ministry in Bratislava

The Ministry of Defence of Slovakia (Slovak: Ministerstvo obrany Slovenskej republiky, MO SR) is responsible for the planning and carrying-out of defence policy. It is the direct successor of the Czechoslovak Ministry of Defence. Its current headquarters is located in Bratislava.

== List of ministers ==
- Imrich Andrejčák (16 March 1993 – 15 March 1994)
- Pavol Kanis (15 March 1994 – 13 December 1994)
- Ján Sitek (13 December 1994 – 30 October 1998)
- Pavol Kanis (30 October 1998 – 2 January 2001)
- Jozef Stank (2 January 2001 – 15 October 2002)
- Ivan Šimko (16 October 2002 – 24 September 2003)
- Eduard Kukan (24 September 2003 – 10 October 2003)
- Juraj Liška (10 October 2003 – 1 February 2006)
- Martin Fedor (1 February 2006 – 4 July 2006)
- František Kašický (4 July 2006 – 30 January 2008)
- Jaroslav Baška (30 January 2008 – 8 July 2010)
- Ľubomír Galko (8 July 2010 – 28 November 2011)
- Iveta Radičová (28 November 2011 – 4 April 2012)
- Martin Glváč (4 April 2012 – 23 March 2016)
- Peter Gajdoš (23 March 2016 – 21 March 2020)
- Jaroslav Naď (21 March 2020 – 15 May 2023)
- Martin Sklenár (15 May 2023 – 25 October 2023)
- Robert Kaliňák (25 October 2023 – present)
