= Technical University in Zvolen =

Public university in Zvolen, Slovakia

Coordinates: 48.5730°N 19.1165°E

- Technická univerzita vo Zvolene
- University Logo
- Other name: TUZVO
- Type: Public
- Active: 1952–College of Forestry and Wood Technology
- Affiliations: ERASMUS/ IFCU, FUCE
- Rector: Rudolf Kropil
- Location: T. G. Masaryka 24, 960 01 Zvolen, Zvolen, Slovakia
- Website: www.tuzvo.sk

Technical University in Zvolen or Technická univerzita vo Zvolene is a public university located in Zvolen, Slovakia. This university is a member of European Forest Institute.

== History ==
The university was established as a higher degree college in 1952. At that time, it was named College of Forestry and Wood Technology In 1991 the college acquired university status and was renamed to Technical University in Zvolen.

== Faculties ==
The university has the following faculties:

- Faculty of Forestry
- Faculty of Ecology and Environmental Sciences
- Faculty of Wood Sciences and Technology
- Faculty of Environmental and Manufacturing Technology
