= Education in Slovakia =

Education in Slovakia is characterized by a free education system with ten years of compulsory school attendance. The majority of schools, particularly universities, are state-owned, although private and church-owned institutions have emerged since the 1990s.

== Overview ==
Education is compulsory for ten years in Slovakia. The academic week runs from Monday to Friday. Saturdays were previously school days but were eliminated before the 1980s. The summer break extends from the beginning of July to the start of September. Universities may also have breaks in June. Shorter breaks are scheduled for around Christmas and Easter, as well as during spring, autumn, and on official holidays. The school year is divided into two semesters, with the first concluding at the end of January and the second before the summer holidays. Primary and secondary school students typically attend approximately six 45-minute classes daily, with fewer classes for younger students and more for older ones. Breaks are interspersed between classes, including several short breaks and a longer "big break." State-funded education, including textbooks and instructional materials up to the university level, is generally free, although private schools are tuition-based. Textbooks are usually returned at the end of each semester. Grading in standard schools involves a numerical scale from 1 (best) to 5 (worst). Teachers may use unofficial intermediary marks for individual assignments, but official reports at the end of each semester list final grades. Compared to some Western European systems, Slovak grading practices may lean towards assigning more marks at the "good" end of the scale, resulting in a higher prevalence of 1s, 2s, and 3s. Students below university level receive school reports with final marks at the end of each semester.

== History ==
The history of education in Slovakia is intertwined with its broader historical context. Prior to the establishment of Czechoslovakia in 1918, education was largely influenced by the Austro-Hungarian Empire. After Czechoslovakia's formation, the education system underwent significant reforms to unify and modernize it across the newly formed nation. During the communist era (1948-1989), education was heavily centralized and ideologically driven, with a focus on technical and vocational training to support the state's planned economy. Following the Velvet Revolution in 1989 and the subsequent dissolution of Czechoslovakia in 1993, Slovakia embarked on a path of educational reform to align with democratic values and market economy needs. This period saw decentralization efforts, curriculum revisions, and the diversification of school types, including the rise of private and church-affiliated schools. Slovakia's entry into the European Union in 2004 further spurred reforms aimed at harmonizing its education system with European standards, particularly through the Bologna Process in higher education.

== Educational System Structure ==
Structure of the Education System in Slovakia
Level/Grade	Typical age
Nursery school (Jasle)	0–3
Kindergarten (Materská škola or škôlka)	3–6
Primary school (Základná škola) for Primary education
1st Grade (Prvý ročník)	6–7
2nd Grade (Druhý ročník)	7–8
3rd Grade (Tretí ročník)	8–9
4th Grade (Štvrtý ročník)	9–10
5th Grade (Piaty ročník)	10–11
6th Grade (Šiesty ročník)	11–12
7th grade (Siedmy ročník)	12–13
8th Grade (Ôsmy ročník)	13–14
9th Grade (Deviaty ročník)	14–15
Secondary school (Stredná škola) for Secondary education
1st Grade (Prvý ročník)	15–16
2nd Grade (Druhý ročník)	16–17
3rd Grade (Tretí ročník)	17–18
4th Grade (Štvrtý ročník)	18–19
Tertiary education (Vysoká škola)
Tertiary education (College or University)	Typically three years for Bachelor's degree and two years for Master's degree. Medical students only six years for Master's degree.

=== Early Childhood Education ===
Early childhood education in Slovakia comprises nurseries (jasle) for children aged 0–3 and kindergartens (materská škola) for children aged 3–6. Kindergarten attendance is not compulsory but is increasingly common, with high enrollment rates in the years leading up to primary school. Kindergartens play a crucial role in preparing children for formal education, focusing on social, emotional, and cognitive development through play-based learning and structured activities.

=== Primary Education ===
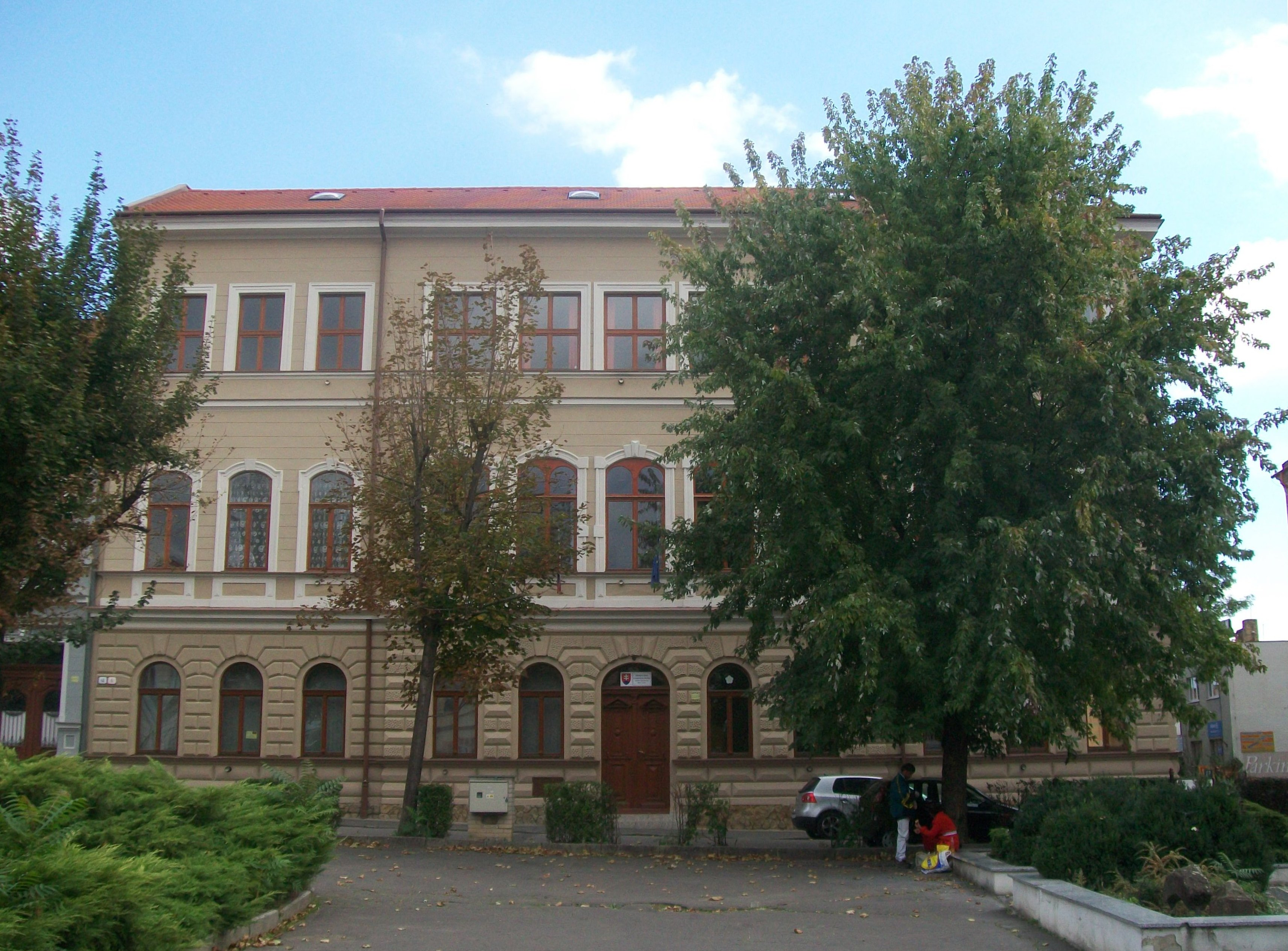
A primary school in Lučenec

Primary education (základná škola) typically begins in the year a child turns six years old and lasts for nine years, divided into two stages. In some cases, primary schools are combined with kindergartens in a single institution. An alternative to the standard nine-year primary school is the "eight-year gymnasium" (osemročné gymnázium), a type of grammar school that students can enter after completing the fourth or fifth grade of primary school. These gymnasia offer a more academically focused curriculum from an earlier age. The primary education curriculum is structured in two stages:

=== First stage of primary education (grades 1–4, age 6–10) ===
This stage lays the foundation for future learning, focusing on basic literacy, numeracy, and social skills.

=== Second stage of primary education (grades 5–9, age 10–15) ===
This stage broadens the curriculum and prepares students for secondary education. Students may attend either grades 5–9 of a standard primary school or grades 5–8 (or 5-9 depending on entry point) of an eight-year gymnasium. Due to demographic shifts and declining birth rates, many primary schools, particularly in rural areas, have been closed or consolidated since around 2000. Subjects taught in the second stage of primary education include:

- Slovak language and literature (or Hungarian/Ukrainian in minority schools)
- Foreign languages (typically English plus a choice of German, French, Russian, or Spanish)
- Mathematics (including geometry) * Geography (physical and political)
- Biology (including botany, zoology, human biology, geology, and environmental science)
- Chemistry
- Physics
- History
- Religion or ethics (optional choice)
- Physical education
- Music education
- Art education
- Technical education

In addition to regular schooling, Slovakia has a tradition of "primary art schools" (základná umelecká škola), which offer extracurricular afternoon classes in music, visual arts, drama, and dance. These schools are popular and attended by a significant number of primary school students.

=== Secondary Education ===
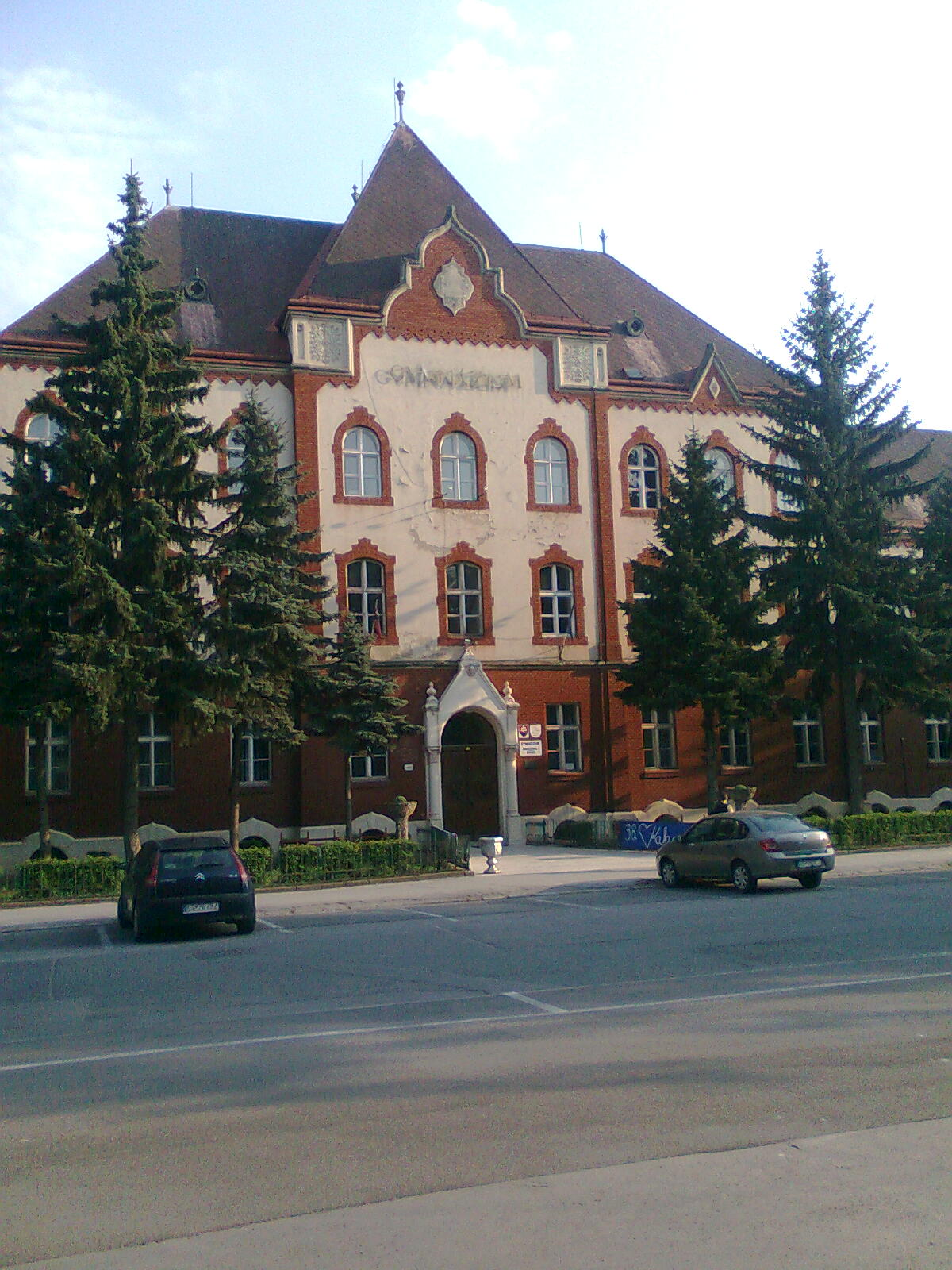
Gymnasium in Košice

Admission to secondary education (stredná škola), including eight-year gymnasia, is often competitive and may require entrance examinations if there are more applicants than available places. Secondary schools typically last for four years (grades 9-12, ages 15–19), although gymnasia can also have five-year (bilingual) or eight-year programs.

There are several types of secondary schools in Slovakia:

General Education (Non-Vocational):

- Gymnázium (Gymnasium/Grammar school/High school): Offers 4-year, 5-year (bilingual), or 8-year programs (ages 15–19 or 10–18). Prepares students for higher education and teaches at least two foreign languages. Gymnasia are generally considered academically prestigious.

Vocational Education:

- Stredná odborná škola (Secondary Vocational School): Usually 4-year programs (ages 15–19). Provides vocational training in specific fields while also preparing students for higher education.
- Stredné odborné učilište (Secondary Vocational Training Centre): Usually 3- or 4-year programs (ages 15–19). Focuses primarily on vocational training and apprenticeships.
- Združená stredná škola (Integrated Secondary School): Combines general and vocational education within a single institution.

Gymnasia are often perceived as the most prestigious secondary schools due to their explicit focus on preparing students for university and their selective admission processes. The most competitive gymnasia are located in major cities such as Bratislava (e.g., Gamča, Gymnázium Metodova, Gymnázium Jura Hronca, and schools for exceptionally gifted children) and Košice (e.g., Gymnázium Poštová), as well as boarding gymnasia like Bilingválne Gymnázium Milana Hodžu in Sučany. These schools often have highly selective admissions, accepting a small percentage of applicants.

Many gymnasia offer specialized classes, such as language-focused or bilingual programs (e.g., Gymnázium Milana Hodžu, Gymnázium Metodova, Gymnázium Jura Hronca) or specialized programs in mathematics or computer science (e.g., Gamča, Gymnázium Jura Hronca). Gamča, for example, has a long history dating back to 1626. Bilingválne Gymnázium Milana Hodžu (GBAS), established in 1993, is known for its strong English-Slovak bilingual program and its role in promoting debate and international education opportunities for Slovak students.

Upon completing secondary education, students typically take the school-leaving exam, known as maturita (or maturita skúška). Passing the maturita is a prerequisite for higher education. The maturita exam system has undergone several reforms. Currently, it includes standardized external and internal components, with subjects including Slovak language and literature, a foreign language, mathematics (optional for some school types), and elective subjects. The reformed system aims to improve comparability and potentially replace university entrance exams in the future.

=== Higher Education ===
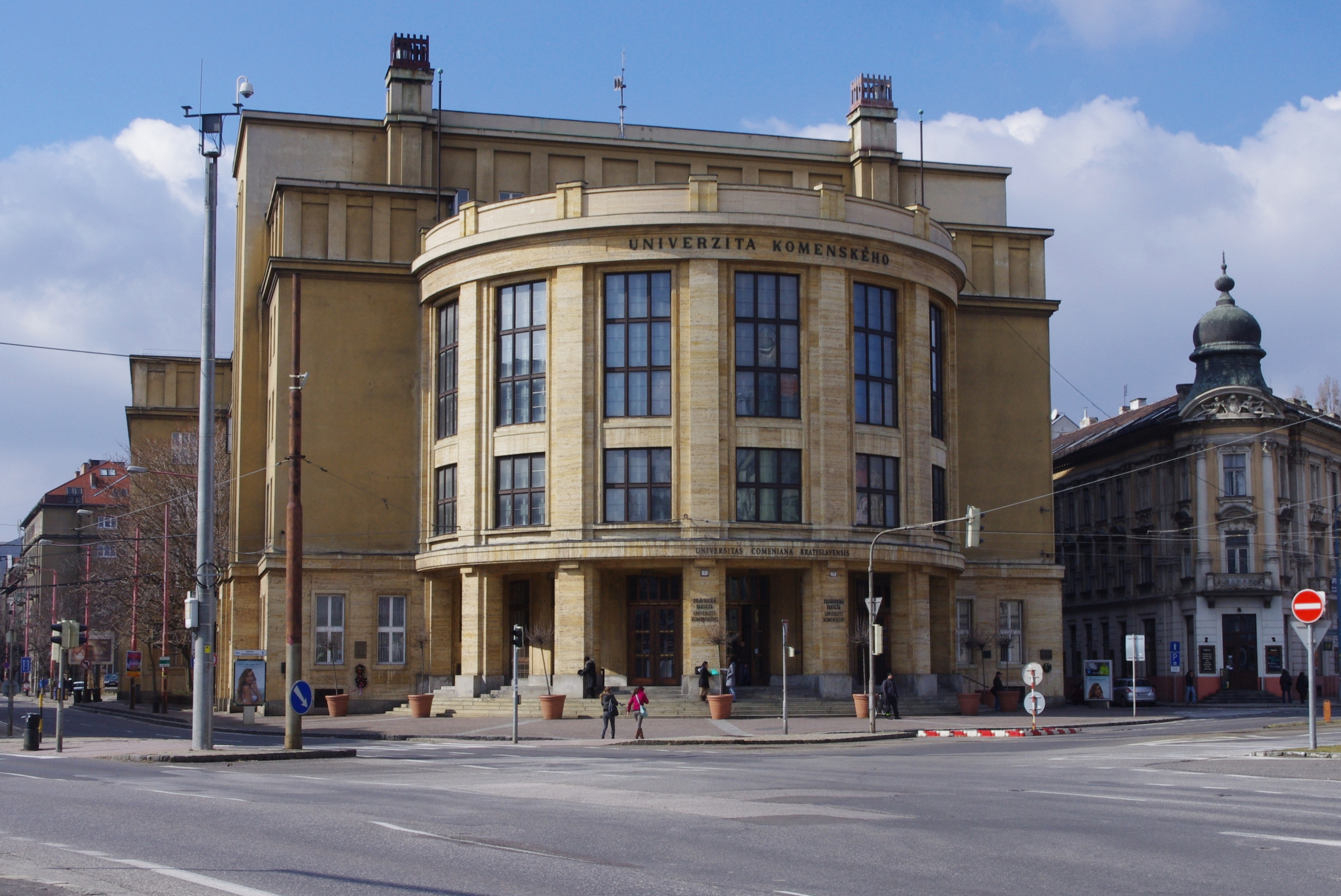
Comenius University headquarters at Šafárikovo námestie in Bratislava

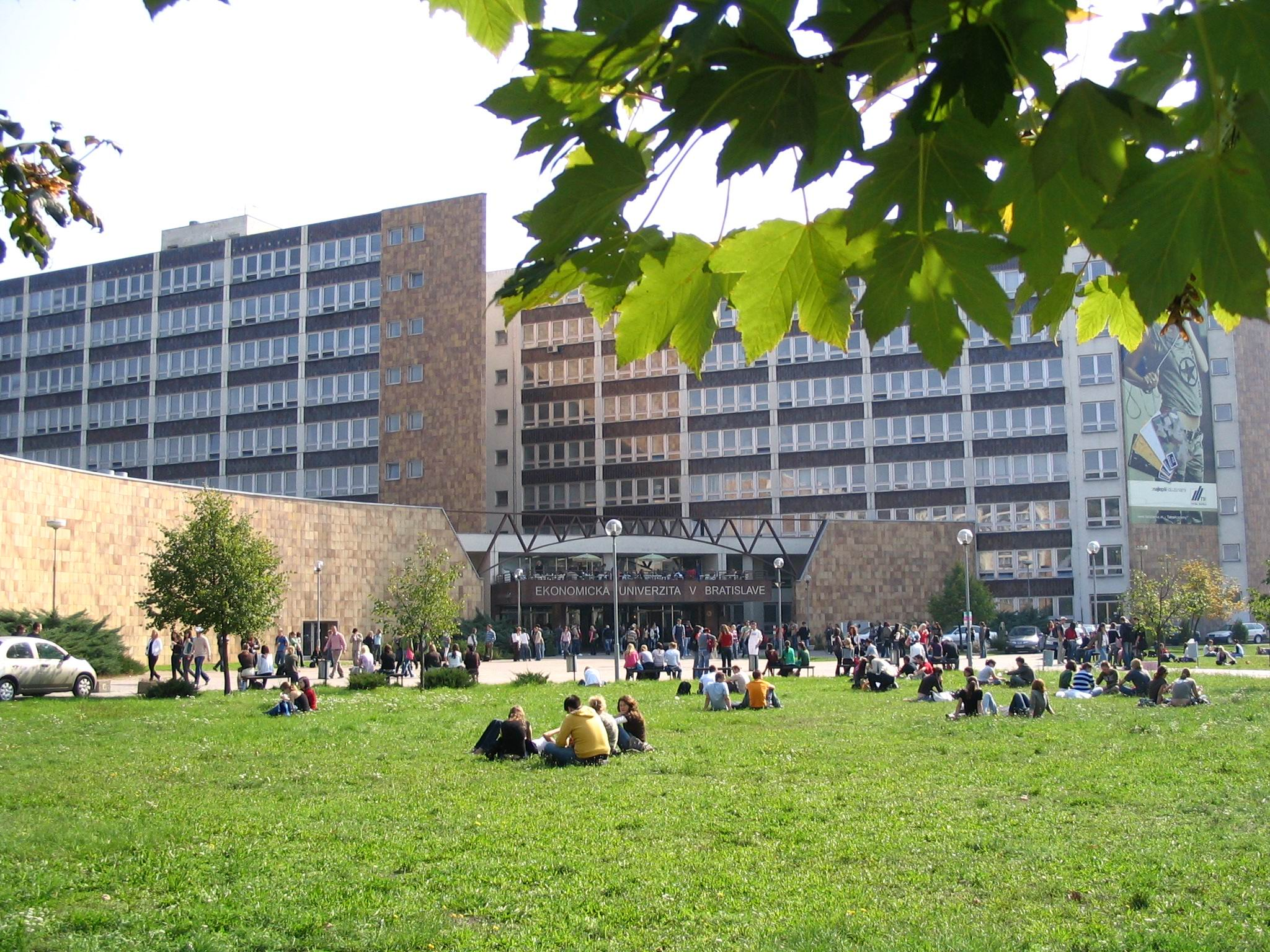
University of Economics in Bratislava

The Slovak term vysoká škola ("school of higher education") encompasses all tertiary education institutions, including both universities and non-university colleges (vysoké školy odborné). The oldest university in Slovakia was Universitas Istropolitana, founded in 1465. The largest and most comprehensive university today is Comenius University in Bratislava. For a comprehensive list, see List of colleges and universities in Slovakia.

The Act on Higher Education Institutions (2002) distinguishes between three types of higher education institutions:

Public Higher Education Institutions: The most common type, established by law and largely funded by the government, as well as through potential business activities. The majority of Slovak universities are public. State Higher Education Institutions: These include military, police, and medical schools, established by relevant government ministries and funded by the government and potential business activities. Private Higher Education Institutions: Established and funded by non-governmental entities but require accreditation from the Ministry of Education. Private institutions are less common than public or state institutions.

Tuition at public and state universities is generally free for Slovak citizens and EU students for programs taught in Slovak. However, programs in foreign languages, particularly English, typically require tuition fees, ranging from approximately US$2,300 to US$13,500 per academic year, depending on the field of study. International students from outside the EU are generally required to pay tuition fees, regardless of the language of instruction. Foreign diplomas must undergo a recognition process in Slovakia to be officially recognized for university enrollment.

Admission to higher education is competitive, and entrance examinations are common, varying by institution and program. Maturita results are also considered in the admission process. The number of higher education institutions and available programs has increased significantly since the late 20th century, leading to a higher overall enrollment rate in tertiary education. A growing number of Slovak students also pursue higher education abroad, particularly in the Czech Republic, due to linguistic proximity, economic factors, and system similarities.

Higher education programs in Slovakia are structured according to the Bologna Process, with three main levels or stages:

Stage 1: Bachelor's degree (bakalár, Bc.): 3–4 years in duration.

Stage 2: Master's degree (magister, Mgr.), Engineer's degree (inžinier, Ing.), or Doctorate (in specific fields): Master's programs typically last 1–3 years following a Bachelor's degree. Doctorate programs at this stage include:

- Doctor of Medicine (MUDr.)
- Doctor of Veterinary Medicine (MVDr.)
- Doctor of Dental Medicine (MDDr.)

Stage 2/3: "Rigorous examinations" Doctorates: Awarded after further rigorous examination and thesis defense, including:

- Doctor of Natural Sciences (RNDr.)
- Doctor of Pharmacy (PharmDr.)
- Doctor of Philosophy (PhDr.)
- Doctor of Laws (JUDr.)
- Doctor of Pedagogy (PaedDr.)
- Doctor of Theology (ThDr.) (non-Catholic)

Stage 3: Doctorate/PhD (Philosophiae Doctor, PhD. or Doctor Artis, ArtD.): Research-focused programs lasting 3–4 years, awarded as PhD. or ArtD. Catholic theology doctorates (ThDr.) and specialized medical studies also fall under this stage.

The Act on Higher Education Institutions (2002) also differentiates between:

University-type higher education institutions (Universities): They provide study programmes at all three stages and with a considerable proportion of the 2nd and 3rd stage. Only these schools are allowed to use the word "university" in their name. Non-university-type schools of higher education = professional schools of higher education: These are the remaining schools (providing predominantly the first stage only)

The academic year in higher education runs from September 1 to August 31, though teaching typically concludes in May or June. The academic year is usually divided into two semesters, or sometimes trimesters. Teaching methods include lectures, seminars, practical exercises, laboratory work, projects, and consultations. Slovakia adopted the European Credit Transfer System (ECTS) in 1998 to standardize credit accumulation and transfer across higher education programs. A standard academic workload is 60 ECTS credits per year (30 per semester).

Student accommodation in dormitories is often available and affordable, although private housing is increasingly popular. University canteens offer subsidized meals. Students are responsible for acquiring their study materials, but they benefit from various discounts, and the state covers health insurance and social security contributions for full-time students under 26 years old.

Universities also offer external (part-time) study programs, which are typically one year longer than full-time programs and do not qualify students for state benefits. External programs are designed to accommodate working students, with modified course schedules. The final exams are the same for both full-time and part-time students.

Among the most desired by employers are STEM degrees with primacy held by degrees in IT, preferably from Slovak University of Technology in Bratislava and engineering degrees. Other desirable degrees for employees are from economics, mostly from University of Economics in Bratislava.
