= City University of Seattle in Slovakia (Vysoká škola manažmentu) =

Coordinates: 48°52′38.71″N 18°1′53.09″E

The School of Management in Bratislava is a private university and, through its educational programs, continues the tradition of providing high-quality education established by the American City University of Seattle, headquartered in Seattle, Washington, USA.

The bachelor's and master's degree programs in Business Management at the School of Management are accredited study programs. The School of Management is part of the network of higher education institutions in Slovakia and is represented in the Slovak Rectors’ Conference, the Council of Higher Education Institutions, and the Student Council of Higher Education Institutions.

As the first private university, the School of Management received a prestigious evaluation from the European University Association in 2007 and, in 2012, the Diploma Supplement Label awarded by the European Commission. The establishment of the School of Management initiated a process of institutional and organizational diversification of higher education in the Slovak Republic. This led to the creation of a private higher education sector as an alternative to public higher education and increased access to higher education beyond the scope of public funding.

Cooperation between the founder of the School of Management and City University of Seattle dates back to 1991, when the first students enrolled in the Bachelor of Science in Business Administration (BSBA) program. The School of Management operates in Bratislava.

City University of Seattle, headquartered in the state of Washington, USA, is accredited by the Northwest Commission on Colleges and Universities (NWCCU). In 1992, this U.S. accreditation was extended to the university's branch in Slovakia. During its visits to Slovakia, the NWCCU confirmed the accreditation of City University of Seattle for programs offered in Slovakia. City University of Seattle continues its contractual cooperation with the School of Management in the development of educational programs, the provision of international study internships, faculty exchange, and the implementation of joint scientific and research projects and conferences.

Upon successful completion of studies at the School of Management and the awarding of a diploma, students may additionally, on the basis of cooperation with City University of Seattle and after completing the required number of bridging examinations, obtain a U.S.-accredited diploma awarded by City University of Seattle.

== Mission and Philosophy ==
VSM is a private not-for-profit institution of higher education. Its mission is to change lives for good by offering high quality and relevant lifelong education to anyone with the desire to learn. The mission is based on these philosophical principles:

- Education is a lifelong process and must be relevant to the student's aspirations;
- Education should be affordable and offered, as much as possible, at the student's convenience; and
- Opportunity to learn should be open to anyone with the desire to achieve.

== Program Offerings ==
- Bachelor in Business Administration (full-time, part-time or online format)
- Magister in Business Administration (full-time, part-time or online format)
- Double degree program Magister/MBA (full-time or part-time format)

== VŠM offers the following degrees ==
- Slovak Bachelor of Business Administration
- Slovak Magister of Business Administration
- City University of Seattle Bachelor of Science in Business Administration (BSBA)
- City University of Seattle Master of Business Administration (MBA)
