= Armed Forces Academy of General Milan Rastislav Štefánik =

Military Academy in Liptovský Mikuláš, Slovakia

Coordinates: 49.066°N 19.592°E

- Akadémia ozbrojených síl generála Milana Rastislava Štefánika
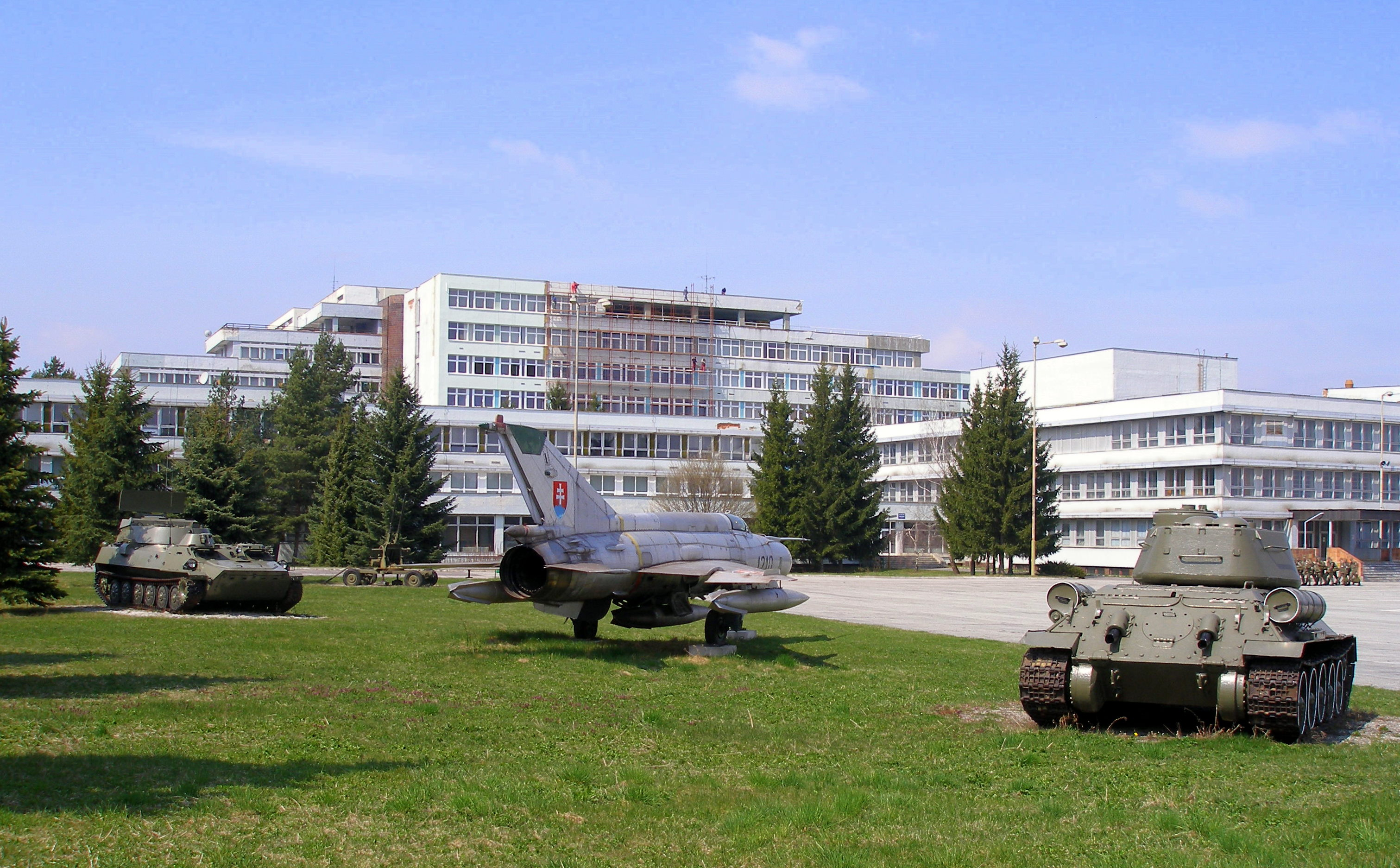
- Other name: AOS
- Former names: Military Technical University of Czechoslovak-Soviet Friendship1973-1993; Military Academy 1993-2004; National Academy of Defence of Marshal Andrej Hadik 2004-2008
- Type: Military academy
- Established: 8 February 1973; 53 years ago
- Academic affiliations: Erasmus Programme
- Budget: € 24.6 million (2021)
- Rector: Jozef Puttera
- Academic staff: 92 (2020/21)
- Students: 522 (2020/21)
- Doctoral students: 54 (2020/21)
- Location: Liptovský Mikuláš, Slovakia
- Website: www.aos.sk/en

The Armed Forces Academy of General Milan Rastislav Štefánik, located in Liptovský Mikuláš, is Slovakia's only Military academy. It was originally established in 1945, right after the end of World War II, first as a High School and from 1973 as a university. AOS has about 500 students, including 50 PhD students. The school is organized in 8 departments:

- Department of Informatics
- Department of Mechanical Engineering
- Department of Electronics
- Department of Logistics
- Department of Social Sciences and Languages
- Department of the Physical Education and Sport
- Department of Security and Defense
- Department of Military Tactics and Operational Art

The academy is named after Milan Rastislav Štefánik, a World War I era Czechoslovak Legion general.

Since 2015, Jozef Puttear, himself an AOS alumnus, has served as the rector of AOS.
