= Matej Bel University =

Slovak university

- Univerzita Mateja Bela
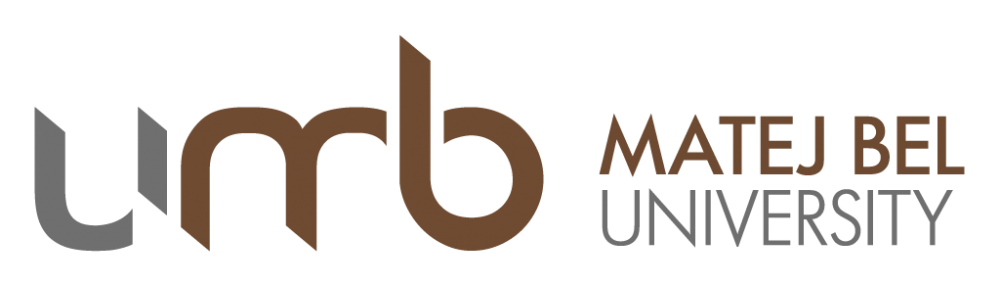
- Motto: Eruditio mores futurum
- Type: Public
- Established: 1992
- Academic affiliations: EUA
- Rector: Vladimír Hiadlovský
- Academic staff: 422
- Students: 6,269 (Fall 2022)
- Undergraduates: 4,313 (Fall 2019)
- Postgraduates: 2,399 (Fall 2019)
- Location: Banská Bystrica, Slovakia; 48.7331°N 19.1455°E
- Campus: Urban
- Colors: Brown and grey
- Sporting affiliations: EUHL
- Website: umb.sk/en

Matej Bel University (commonly referred as Matej Bel or UMB) (Slovak: Univerzita Mateja Bela) is a public research university in the central Slovak town of Banská Bystrica. The university was established in 1992. It bears the name of Matthias Bel, a Hungarian-Slovak Lutheran scholar of the 18th century. UMB comprises six faculties that differ in character and history, each retaining substantial autonomy on financial and institutional affairs. The university provides undergraduate and graduate instruction in the humanities, social sciences and natural sciences.

Throughout its existence, UMB alumni, faculty, and staff have included one president and one prime minister of Slovakia; four justices of the Constitutional Court of Slovakia, two of whom currently serve; numerous Fulbright Scholars; and multiple senior EU and Slovak officials. Additionally, students and alumni have won 4 Olympic medals (2 gold).

== History ==
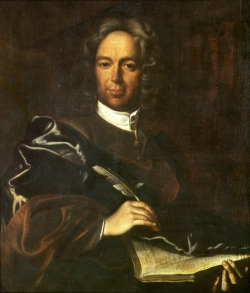
Matthias Bel, Lutheran pastor and polymath

Banská Bystrica (until 1920: Besztercebánya) has a long tradition in schooling and culture. In the 13th century, there had already existed a parish school, later a town school. In the 17th century, a Jesuit school, as well as Evangelical grammar schools, were founded. Matthias Bel, after whom the university is named, studied and later worked as a rector at the latter.

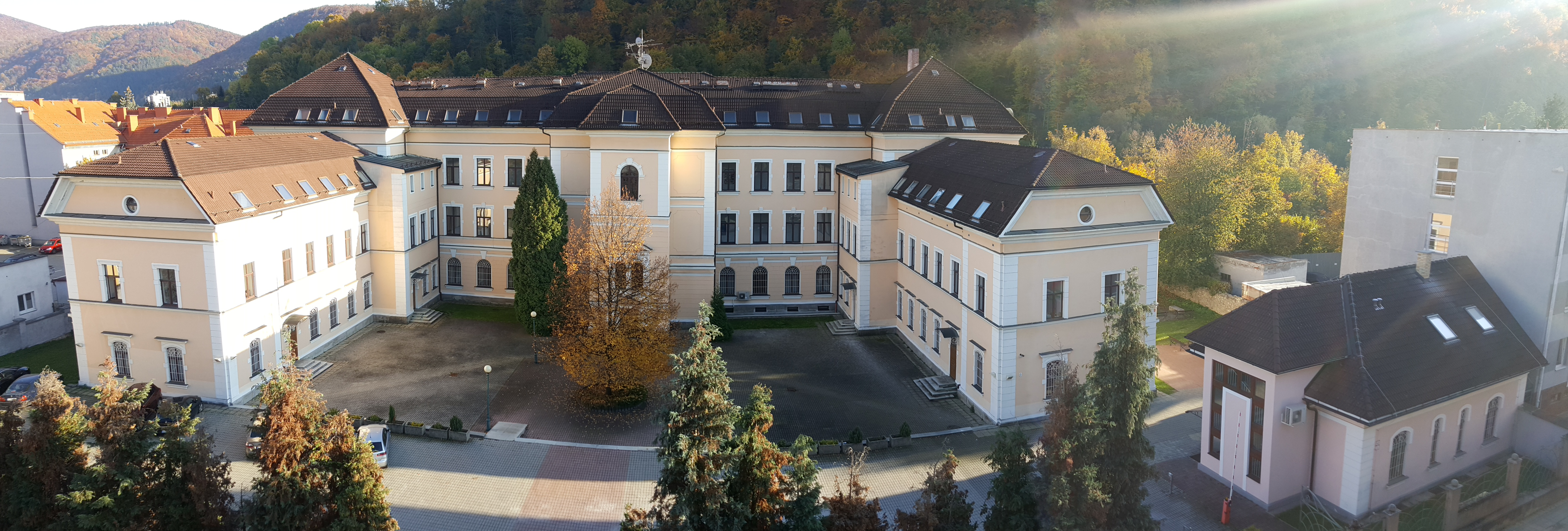
Overview of the university

In the 1850s and 1860s, the Catholic grammar school with Slovak as a tuition language became an important center of education in the Kingdom of Hungary. In the school year 1856–57 the first Teacher's Preparation Study was founded in Besztercebánya, where Slovak language was taught together with German and Latin, thanks to the bishop Štefan Moyses.

In the school year 1949–50, a branch of the Faculty of Education, Slovak University of Bratislava, was established in Banská Bystrica. The first higher school appeared in Banská Bystrica in 1954. It was called the Higher School of Pedagogy. On 1 September 1964 the Faculty of Education was founded. In 1973, the branch of the Faculty of Commerce, University of Economics in Bratislava, was established and in 1977 transformed into the Faculty of Economics of Services and Tourism. Matej Bel University was established on 1 July 1992, after the integration of the Faculty of Education and the Faculty of Economics of Services and Tourism.

== Governance and faculties ==
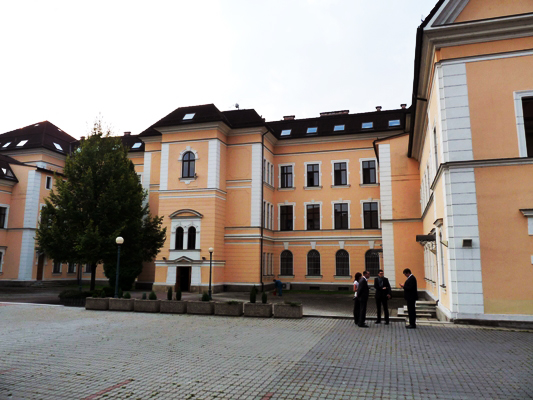
Courtyard of the Faculty of Political Science and International Relations, Matej Bel University

The Matej Bel University has traditionally been a decentralized institution, with governing authority shared among its academic faculties. The Governing Council is the unicameral legislative organ of the central administration, overseeing general academic, business and institutional affairs. The rector is appointed by the council as the chief executive.

Matej Bel University currently comprises six faculties:

- Faculty of Economics
- Faculty of Arts
- Faculty of Political Science and International Relations
- Faculty of Natural Sciences
- Faculty of Law
- Faculty of Education

=== Library and collections ===
The Matej Bel University Library System is one of the largest university-academic library systems in Slovakia, measured by number of volumes held. Establishment of the Matej Bel University Library in Banská Bystrica is connected with the foundation of the Higher College of Education in Banská Bystrica in 1954. In 1964, after the foundation of Faculty of Education, it became the central library of the faculty.

Since 1 January 1993 the library has served as Matej Bel University Library in Banská Bystrica. In the same year, the Library of the Faculty of Economy of Services and Tourism in Banská Bystrica was annexed to the Central Library of the Faculty of Education. Since 1975 the Library of the Faculty of Economy of Services and Travel served as a branch of the Central Economic Library in Bratislava. In 1996 the library system was decentralized. Having regard to the Academic Senate of the University of Matej Bel. The Matej Bel University Library system was abolished on 1 April 1996, and four new libraries were established, those were directly controlled by the faculties. This changed on 1 January 2000, when the Rector UMB Library act of 2000 entered into force, this connected the decentralized libraries of the faculties into the "Matej Bel University Library system.

=== International partnership ===
Cooperation of the university with other universities and institutions is widespread and involves many national and international organizations, such as the University of Bologna in Italy, Waseda University in Japan, Sogang University in South Korea, and Indiana University in United States.

Today, Matej Bel University has 35 partnerships worldwide, apart from these agreements, the faculties have also signed agreements on cooperation based on the specific needs of their own, or their departments, totaling the number of partnerships to more than 80.

== Notable people ==
Name	Class year	Notability	Reference(s)
Danka Barteková		Olympic Medalist and member of the International Olympic Committee	
Jaroslav Naď		Politician – Minister of Defence of Slovakia	
Pavol Hurajt		Biathlete; 2010 Winter Olympics – bronze medal	
Elena Kaliská		slalom canoeist; 2008 Winter Olympics	
Ľubomír Dobrík		Justice of the Constitutional Court of Slovakia	
Ján Richter		Politician – Minister of Labour, Social Affairs and Family of Slovakia	
Monika Flašíková-Beňová		Politician – Member of the European Parliament	
Peter Pellegrini		Politician – Prime minister of the Slovak Republic	
Adriana Kučerová		Soprano; studied at Matej Bel to be a teacher	
Marian Kotleba		Politician – Governor of the Banská Bystrica region	
Martin Sklenár		Civil servant – Minister of Defence of Slovakia	
