= Fazze =

Russian marketing company

- Company type: Subsidiary
- Industry: Marketing
- Parent: AdNow

Fazze is an influencer marketing agency. It is a subsidiary of AdNow, a Russian-based marketing firm. The agency was behind a multi-country campaign to spread COVID-19 disinformation online. Fazze, a Russian marketing firm affiliate, maintained a network of 65 fake Facebook and 243 fake Instagram accounts as part of a disinformation campaign targeting Western-made vaccinations, according to a Facebook investigation.
