= EU-Russia Centre =

The EU-Russia Centre is an independent information and expertise resource for anyone interested in modern Russia, its democratic status and the future of EU-Russia relations.

== Mission ==
It seeks to promote closer ties between the EU and Russia, to develop ideas about the future of the relationship, and to ensure that both sides adhere to international standards concerning the key elements of a civil society such as democracy, human rights and an independent judiciary.

== EU-Russia Business Forum ==
In 2008, the EU-Russia Business Forum was established to bring together a small number of business representatives alongside key influencers from across the EU and Russia. This group helps define the terms of the new strategic relationship between the EU and Russia and interact with those that shape that relationship. It uses dialogue, debate and study to help both partners to adjust to new challenges and opportunities, to identify their common interests and to minimise actual or potential misunderstandings.

== Founding board ==
The EU-Russia Centre Founding Board is made up of four highly experienced European political figures: President: Lord Ashdown (Paddy Ashdown), former leader of the UK's Liberal Democrat party, and most recently the EU's special representative in Bosnia and Herzegovina Dr Günter Burghardt, former EU ambassador to the United States following a 30-year career at senior levels of the European Commission, latterly as director general for external relations from 1993 to 2000 Pat Cox, President of the European Movement and former president of the European Parliament. Heidi Hautala, a Finnish MP (Green Party) and former MEP until 2003 with a particular interest in EU and Russian affairs.

As founding members of the EU-Russia Centre, they provide strategic advice and insights into EU-Russia relations, speak on behalf of the centre and represent its priorities to the EU institutions, European and Russian governments, the media and other policy makers.

Centre Director, Dr Fraser Cameron, a former EU diplomat and adviser, leads the centre's day-to-day activities, supported by Secretary General, Maria Ordzhonikidze.

== Advisory board members and support group ==
Since its launch in May 2006, the EU-Russia Centre has established an advisory board of leading experts from a number of disciplines and countries ranging from Foreign Affairs to International Law. Its members are active as speakers, conference and panel participants and authors.

== Activity ==
The EU-Russia Centre has a lively and informative website that regularly publishes articles by commentators such as George Bovt, Russian independent journalist and political observer, regular contributor to The Moscow Times and gazeta.ru, Dr Fraser Cameron, Centre Director, Olena Prystayko. Address www.eu-russiacentre.org

The EU-Russia Centre also publishes Reviews and research regularly throughout the year among the most recent: Review VIII Russian Foreign Policy, Review VII Voices from Russia II, Review VI Russia and the Rule of Law. These can be downloaded at http://www.eu-russiacentre.org/reviews

== See also ==
- Russia–European Union relations
