= AdNow =

- Industry: digital marketing
- Founded: 2014
- Founder: Yulia Serebryanskaya
- Headquarters: Plovdiv, Bulgary
- Products: advertising network
- Owner: Giorgi Abuladze

AdNow is a digital marketing company involved in several disinformation campaigns in the EU.

== History ==
AdNow was founded in 2014 by Yulia Serebryanskaya, a former Russian state media employee who worked on Vladimir Putin's and Dmitry Medvedev's campaigns and headed the political advertising department of the United Russia political party's central committee. Financial Times investigation found that the ultimate beneficiary of the company was her brother, Mikhail Serebryansky.

The Russian office of AdNow was located on Odesskaya Street, Moscow, the same address as other Serebryansky's firms and Serebryanskaya's 2WTrade. As noted by Radio Svoboda, that company was blamed for promoting and selling fake health and beauty products.

Its UK-based entity (founded in 2014, dissolved in 2023) was located at 5 Percy Street, London. It was owned and managed by a British citizen, Ewan Tolladay, and a Russian national, Stanislav Fesenko, both tied to a phishing and malware company, AnnGames (previously called Mottogeek).

That address is a "corporate mailbox" used by 170 other companies. One of them was the operation company of the BTC-e cryptocurrency exchange, which was employed for money laundering (the scheme was revealed by a 2019 Bellingcat investigation) and used by the GRU-linked Fancy Bear hackers.

Another company located there was connected to Romanian organization Tracia Unită with ties to far-right groups and business interests in the Russian embassy in Bucharest.

Following Serebryansky's death in 2023, the ownership of AdNow's parent company changed. It was transferred to a Georgian citizen, Giorgi Abuladze. Earlier that year, he established numerous companies (by then, he owned fifty firms) and employed hundreds of Russian nationals. AdNow's headquarters moved to Plovdiv, Bulgaria, but the company still employed numerous Russian residents.

By 2024, the company was operational and ran ads on 85 websites, including the Serbian edition of Euronews.

== Campaigns ==
=== Anti-vax conspiracy ===
In 2020 and 2021, AdNow (via its subsidiary Fazze) ran campaigns against COVID-19 vaccines. For instance, during the political debate over emergency authorization of the AstraZeneca vaccine in India, fake accounts on several social platforms falsely portrayed the vaccine as dangerous because it used an adenovirus derived from chimpanzees. In May 2021, the company approached a number of EU-based bloggers to broadcast information denigrating the Pfizer vaccine. However, these bloggers drew attention to such attempts. Later, Meta reported that it removed 65 Facebook accounts and 243 Instagram accounts linked to AdNow and Fazze. Fazze was dissolved later that year.

=== Romania ===
Since the mid-2010s, AdNow has been active in Romania.

According to the Intelligence Online investigation, the company paid almost Euro 2 million to Romanian entities (the volume reflects wire transfers, not all possible payment methods) with volumes spiking prior to the 2019 European Parliament election and the 2019 Romanian presidential election. AdNow had contracts with Romania TV, a popular TV channel with pro-Russian bias, to advertise unscientific medical practices and dubious financial schemes.

The company also made transfers to local media personae Andrei Laslau, Daniel Polifrone (AZ News), and Razvan Miulescu and Nicoleta Miulescu (Secret Media), all of whom were involved in spreading anti-Western or health-related conspiracy theories. The investigators believed that such a cooperation resembled the method Russian actors used to finance several conservative and conspiracy theory influencers in the U.S.

AdNow also promoted fake websites impersonating real reputable media, such as the Romanian edition of RFI or the Romanian TV news channel Digi24, which closely resembled the Russian disinformation campaign Doppelganger, which also previously targeted RFI.

Bulgarian cybersecurity researchers group BG Elves reported that AdNow conducted invasive tracking on users in Bulgaria and Romania and used fake offers and rewards to convince users to provide personal data and install malware. According to them, AdNow used data to distribute propaganda and advertisements with controversial content, including sensational and misleading claims.

RAAM described AdNow's activities as long-term groundwork that enabled amplifying content in support of pro-Russia candidate Călin Georgescu prior to the 2024 Romanian presidential election.
