= Criminal case of Lisa F. =

2016 crime in Germany

In the alleged criminal case of Lisa F., a 13 year old Russian-German girl was reported missing for over a day in Berlin in January 2016 and, after returning, she first claimed that she had been kidnapped and raped by three strangers. The case was promptly used by Russian officials and media to accuse Germany of tolerating and covering up child abuse. These accusations provoked demonstrations of Russian Germans in several cities in Germany. The kidnapping story was shortly after proven to be false by police after analysis of mobile phone logs and Lisa admitted she went into hiding voluntarily and wasn't raped.

A German citizen of Turkish origin with whom Lisa stayed during her disappearance admitted having a sexual intercourse with her previously and was found guilty of child sexual abuse and producing child pornography. Police also investigated another man who had sexual contacts with her before her disappearance, a Turkish citizen. The charge against him was dropped, as he was not aware of the girl's real age.

== Incident ==
On 11 January, Lisa F. (name shortened in accordance with German privacy law), a 13-year-old Russian-German girl with dual citizenship from Berlin-Marzahn, disappeared on her way to school. Her parents reported her missing to the police. The following day she returned after 30 hours and told her parents that she had been abducted by three unknown men of "southern" or "Arab" origin, who did not speak German well. Furthermore, she initially told the police that she had been beaten and raped. Her phone record however indicated that she had stayed at her older friend Ismet S., which hinted the German police that the rest of the story was a false statement.

However, her friend admitted to having a sexual intercourse with Lisa a few months earlier. German police conducted criminal investigations of two men, one a Turkish citizen and one a German citizen of Turkish origin, because such contact would be a criminal offence under German law even if happened voluntarily. The incident led to intensive media reporting, especially in Russian media, and to diplomatic tensions between Germany and Russia. The Russian foreign minister, Sergey Lavrov, accused German authorities of hushing up the case. German foreign minister Frank-Walter Steinmeier rejected the allegations and warned Russia of "politicising" the case. After the Russian media extensively covered the story and claimed that the girl had been mistreated and held as a "sex slave", many Russian Germans held demonstrations in several parts of Germany, amongst others in front of the Bundeskanzleramt in Berlin on 24 January.

During further questioning the girl told another version of the events, in which she went along with the men voluntarily. A spokesman for the prosecutor's office said: "We proceed from consensual sexual contact." Berlin police also denied that there had been an abduction or rape, but nonetheless conducted further criminal investigations against two suspects. Relatives of Lisa stuck to the allegations which the girl had raised at first.

On 29 January, a prosecutor's spokesman told the press that on the night in question the girl had been at the home of a 19-year-old male acquaintance, who is not suspected to have had sexual contact with her, but is considered a witness. The police found that man by evaluating data from a cell phone, as the girl herself had told several versions of the story. Apparently the girl wanted to get away and sought shelter at his home. She had had problems in school and did not want to go to her parents. Nevertheless, criminal investigation regarding severe child abuse continued against two Germans, who are suspected to have had sexual contact with her months before her disappearance. The age of consent in Germany is 14. The charge against one of them was dropped, as he was not aware of the girl's real age. Ismet S. was fined and convicted in June 2017, with a suspended sentence of two years in jail. He was found guilty of child abuse and producing child pornography.

On 29 January, Steinmeier and Lavrov agreed during a phone call not to broach the case any further. On 31 January a speaker for the prosecutor's office told the press that the girl had "immediately admitted that the story of the rape was not true" when questioned by specialists three days after her disappearance. However, on 1 February her mother, Svetlana F., repeated the allegations initially made by the girl, adding that Lisa had hematomas under her eyes and blood in her mouth when she came home. The girl was treated in a hospital's psychiatric ward.

== Reactions ==
- Sergey Lavrov, Russian foreign minister, accused the German authorities of a tendency "to paint over reality in a politically correct manner for domestic political reasons" and suggested that "the girl clearly not disappeared for 30 hours voluntarily."
- Frank-Walter Steinmeier, the German foreign minister, warned Russia not to use the case for "political propaganda". The Russian ambassador in Berlin was summoned to the German Foreign Ministry "for talks".
- Karl-Georg Wellmann, Russia expert of the German CDU party, said: "The Lisa case is being used as further alleged evidence that the refugee crisis is no longer under control."

== Demonstrations ==
After the Russian media extensively covered the story and reported that the girl had been mistreated and held as a "sex slave", many Russian Germans reacted with anger; beginning on 18 January there were demonstrations in several parts of Germany, amongst others in front of the Bundeskanzleramt in Berlin on 23 January.
