= General debate of the seventy-second session of the United Nations General Assembly =

United Nations General Debate Assembly

- 19 – 25 September 2017 72nd session 72nd general debate

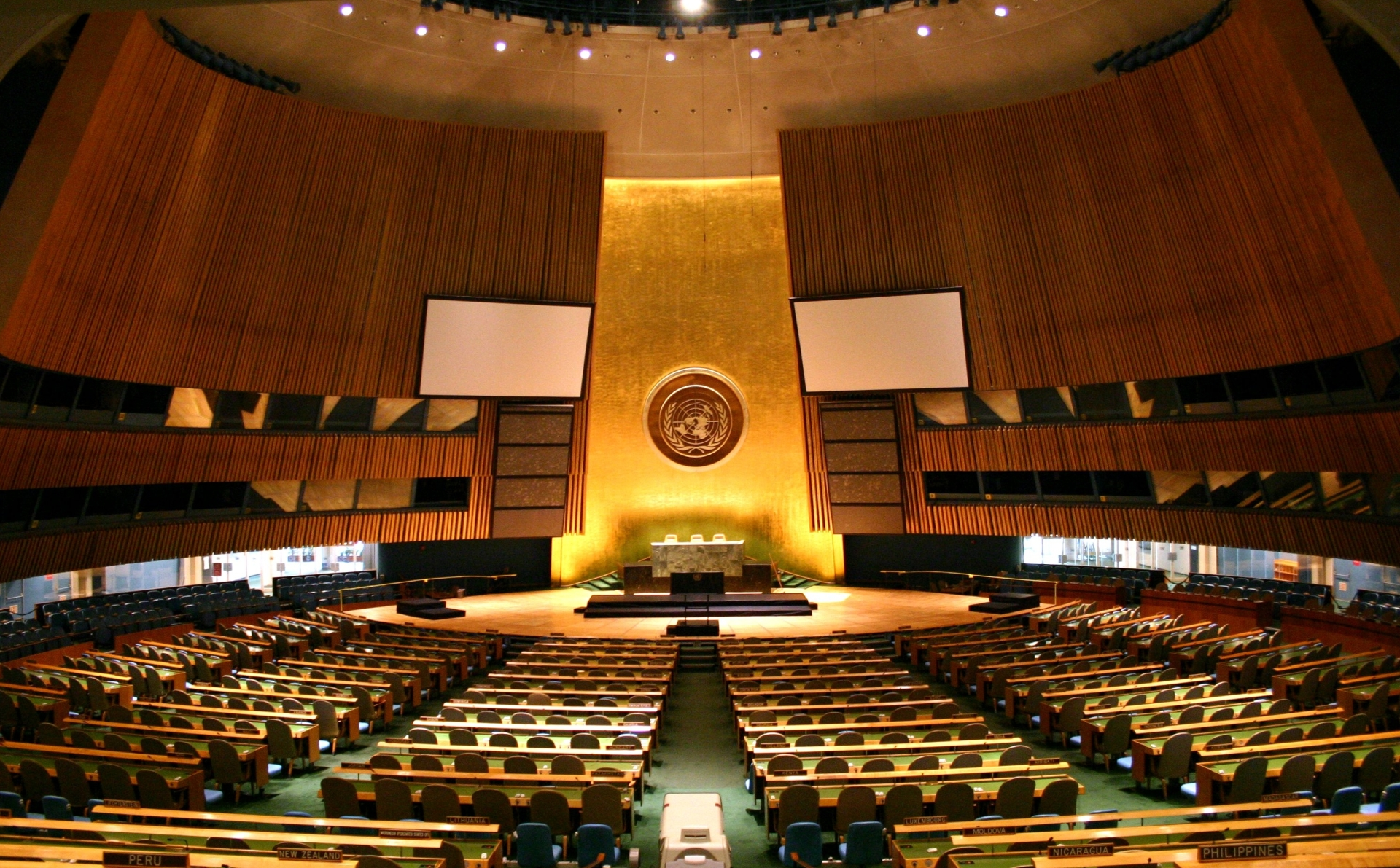
- General Assembly Hall at United Nations Headquarters, New York City
- Host country: United Nations
- Cities: New York City, United States
- Venues: General Assembly Hall at the United Nations Headquarters
- Participants: United Nations Member States
- President: Miroslav Lajčák
- Secretary-General: António Guterres
- Website: gadebate.un.org/en/sessions-archive/72

The General debate of the seventy-second session of the United Nations General Assembly (UNGA) commenced on 19 September 2017 and ended on 25 September 2017. Leaders from a number of member states addressed the UNGA.

== Organisation and subjects ==
The order of speakers is given first to member states, then observer states and supranational bodies. Any other observers entities will have a chance to speak at the end of the debate, if they so choose. Speakers will be put on the list in the order of their request, with special consideration for ministers and other government officials of similar or higher rank. According to the rules in place for the General Debate, the statements should be in of the United Nations official languages of Arabic, Chinese, English, French, Russian or Spanish, and will be translated by the United Nations translators. Each speaker is requested to provide 20 advance copies of their statements to the conference officers to facilitate translation and to be presented at the podium. Though there is no time limit for speeches, a voluntary guideline of 15 minutes is requested. The president's chosen theme for this year's debate was chosen by President Miroslav Lajcak as "Focusing on People: Striving for Peace and a Decent Life for All on a Sustainable Planet."

== Speaking schedule ==
=== 19 September ===
Morning schedule

- United Nations – Secretary-General António Guterres (Note: First speech to the UNGA General Debate.)
- United Nations – 72nd Session of the United Nations General Assembly - President Miroslav Lajcak (Opening statement)
- Brazil – President Michel Temer
- United States – President Donald Trump (Note: First speech to the UNGA General Debate.)
- Guinea – President Alpha Condé
- Switzerland – President Doris Leuthard
- Slovakia – President Andrej Kiska
- Nigeria – President Muhammadu Buhari
- Czech Republic – President Miloš Zeman
- Liberia – President Ellen Johnson-Sirleaf
- France – President Emmanuel Macron
- Liberia – President Ellen Johnson-Sirleaf (Scheduled)
- Colombia – President Juan Manuel Santos Calderón
- Tajikistan – President Emomali Rahmon
- Zambia – President Edgar Chagwa Lungu
- Lithuania – President Dalia Grybauskaitė
- Qatar – Emir Tamim bin Hamad Al Thani
- Turkey – President Recep Tayyip Erdoğan
- Israel – Prime Minister Benjamin Netanyahu

Afternoon schedule (Note: Session started immediately after a formal closing of the previous one.)

- Mali – President Ibrahim Boubacar Keïta
- Monaco – Prince Albert II
- Poland – President Andrzej Duda
- Egypt – President Abdel Fattah el-Sisi
- Uzbekistan – President Shavkat Mirziyoyev
- Armenia – President Serzh Sargsyan
- Costa Rica – President Luis Guillermo Solís Rivera
- Uganda – President Yoweri Kaguta Museveni
- Sri Lanka – President Maithripala Sirisena
- Dominican Republic – President Danilo Medina Sánchez (Scheduled)
- Estonia – President Kersti Kaljulaid
- Guatemala – President Jimmy Morales
- Afghanistan – President Mohammad Ashraf Ghani Ahmadzai

Evening schedule

- Gambia – President Adama Barrow (Note: First speech to the UNGA General Debate.)
- Bolivia – President Evo Morales Ayma
- Mauritania – President Mohamed Ould Abdel Aziz (Scheduled)
- Honduras – President Juan Orlando Hernández Alvarado
- Austria – Foreign Minister Sebastian Kurz
- Mauritania – Foreign Minister Isselkou Ould Ahmed Izid Bih
- South Africa – President Jacob Zuma (Scheduled)

==== Right of Reply ====
Member states have the option to reply to comments on the day (or even to the days prior), but are limited to 10 minutes for the first response and five minutes for the second response. All speeches are made from the floor, as opposed to the podium for the General Debate.

Iran used its turn to respond (through a translator) to Israel in saying that the "representative of the Israeli regime made unfounded allegations by trying to deceive the world to distract public opinion from [the] hideous actions of his regime. The nature of the regime that is founded on occupation, violence, and terror can in no way be covered up by accusing others." He said that Israel has "weapons of mass misinformation but in this information age it is becoming useless day-by-day. Instead of trying to deceive he should explain to the Assembly why it has invaded all of its neighbours and even beyond the region. It has waged over 15 wars in its lifetime. Why does it ignore tens of resolutions of this Assembly, as well as over 100 resolutions? [As] he spoke today...why does the state sponsor of terrorism continue such acts, including of supporting ISIS by providing arms and assistance...sure this regime has an exceptional capability in committing all crimes, including genocide, crimes against humanity, war crimes and crimes of aggression, including oppression. It is exceptional in barbarity. It has an exceptional capability in killing women and children, destroying homes, schools, and hospitals. It has an exceptional capability in terrorism. He claimed his regime saves live around the world but why does it oppress Palestinians daily. Why does it jail and arrest thousands of Palestinians and why does it carry out a blockade against millions in the Gaza Strip. Does he think that by wearing white he can cover up his red hands? Does he think the world forgets the Sabra and Shatila massacre? He did not explain why the regime, despite its arsenal of conventional weapons, does it have chemical, biological and nuclear weapons. Why is it not a party to end weapons of mass destruction, in particular the NPT. Why does it reject the establish of a nuclear-free Middle East despite repeated calls by the UN, the international community and this Assembly over the past 30 years? One question he was expected to answer is why his regime which is the only nuclear weapons possessor in the Middle East, hides behind the doctrine of strategic ambiguity. He shamelessly lectures the world on non-proliferation and accuses Iran, whose [non-military] nuclear capability has been approved by the IAEA. He tried to abuse this Assembly by only accusing others. He also tried to create anxiety over the JCPOA."

The session was then ended for the day.

=== 20 September ===
Morning schedule

- Finland – President Sauli Niinistö
- Kyrgyzstan – President Almazbek Atambaev
- Azerbaijan – President Ilham Heydar oglu Aliyev
- Guyana – President David Arthur Granger
- Bosnia and Herzegovina – Chairman of the Presidency Dragan Cović
- Panama – President Juan Carlos Varela Rodríguez
- Rwanda – President Paul Kagame
- Ukraine – President Petro Poroshenko (Scheduled)
- Paraguay – President Horacio Manuel Cartes Jara
- Iran – President Hassan Rouhani
- Bulgaria – President Rumen Radev

Late morning session

- Ivory Coast – President Alassane Ouattara
- Ukraine – President Petro Poroshenko
- Palestine – President Mahmoud Abbas
- European Union – President of the European Council Donald Tusk
- Portugal – Prime Minister António Luís Santos da Costa
- Japan – Prime Minister Shinzo Abe
- Netherlands – Prime Minister Mark Rutte
- United Kingdom – Prime Minister Theresa May
- Italy – Prime Minister Paolo Gentiloni

Afternoon schedule

- Ecuador – President Lenin Moreno Garcés
- Argentina – Vice President Marta Gabriela Michetti Illia
- Republic of the Congo – President Denis Sassou Nguesso
- Chile – President Michelle Bachelet Jeria
- Latvia – President Raimonds Vējonis
- South Africa – President Jacob Zuma
- Namibia – President Hage Geingob
- Montenegro – President Filip Vujanović
- Romania – President Klaus Werner Iohannis
- Malawi – President Arthur Peter Mutharika
- Madagascar – President Hery Martial Rajaonarimampianina Rakotoarimanana
- Senegal – President Macky Sall
- Swaziland – King Mswati III
- Libya – President Faiez Mustafa Serraj (Note: The government of Libya is disputed between a parliament sitting in the national capital of Tripoli and another that is temporarily sitting in Tobruk.)
- Nauru – President Baron Divavesi Waqa
- Myanmar – Vice President Henry Van Thio
- Kuwait – Prime Minister Sheikh Jaber Al-Mubarak Al-Hamad Al Sabah
- Norway – Prime Minister Erna Solberg (Scheduled)
- Fiji – Prime Minister Josaia Voreqe Bainimarama
- Morocco – Foreign Minister Nasser Bourita
- Dominican Republic – Foreign Minister Miguel Vargas Maldonado

=== 21 September ===
Morning schedule

- Serbia – President Aleksandar Vučić
- Haiti – President Jovenel Moise
- South Korea – President Moon Jae-in
- Lebanon – President Michel Aoun
- Cyprus – President Nicos Anastasiades
- Burkina Faso – President Roch Marc Christian Kaboré
- Ghana – President Nana Addo Dankwa Akufo-Addo
- Gabon – President Ali Bongo Ondimba
- Yemen – President Abdrabuh Mansour Hadi Mansour (Note: The government of Yemen is disputed between a parliament sitting in the national capital of Sanaa and another that is temporarily sitting in Aden.)
- Seychelles – President Danny Faure
- Botswana – Vice President Mokgweetsi Eric Masisi
- Croatia – Prime Minister Andrej Plenković
- Canada – Prime Minister Justin Trudeau
- Samoa – Prime Minister Tuilaepa Sailele Malielegaoi
- Slovenia – Prime Minister Miro Cerar
- Germany – Vice Chancellor Sigmar Gabriel
- Russia – Foreign Minister Sergey Lavrov
- China – Foreign Minister Wang Yi

Afternoon schedule

- El Salvador – President Salvador Sánchez Cerén
- Comoros – President Azali Assoumani
- Palau – President Thomas Remengesau Jr.
- Equatorial Guinea – President Teodoro Obiang Nguema Mbasogo
- Sao Tome and Principe – President Evaristo do Espirito Santo Carvalho
- Zimbabwe – President Robert Gabriel Mugabe
- Indonesia – Vice President Muhammad Jusuf Kalla
- Jordan – Crown Prince Al Hussein bin Abdullah II

Evening schedule

- Georgia – Prime Minister Giorgi Kvirikashvili (Scheduled)
- Tuvalu – Prime Minister Enele Sosene Sopoaga
- Georgia – Prime Minister Giorgi Kvirikashvili
- Antigua and Barbuda – Prime Minister Gaston Alphonso Browne
- Pakistan – Prime Minister Shahid Khaqan Abbasi
- Mauritius – Prime Minister Pravind Kumar Jugnauth
- Bangladesh – Prime Minister Sheikh Hasina
- Vanuatu – Prime Minister Charlot Salwai
- Guinea-Bissau – Prime Minister Umaro Sissoco Embaló
- Togo – Prime Minister Selom Komi Klassou
- Belarus – Foreign Minister Vladimir Makei
- Kazakhstan – Foreign Minister Kairat Abdrakhmanov
- Spain – Foreign Minister Alfonso María Dastis Quecedo
- Denmark – Foreign Minister Anders Samuelsen (Scheduled)
- Luxembourg – Foreign Minister Jean Asselborn
- Denmark –

==== Right of Reply ====
Ukraine responded to Russia in saying that it would be brief due to the late hour (about 22:45). The representative said that the "last thing the General Assembly needs is to get into different exchanges. Russia is recognised by the United Nation as an occupying power in Ukraine. [This is] recognised by the General Assembly, the most representative UN body. Russia has no moral right to lecture on Ukraine until it returns sovereignty."

India then responded to Pakistan in criticising its "defence of terrorism. It is odd that the state that sheltered Osama bin Laden and Mullah Omar should have the gumption to suggest terrorism. Thus this august Assembly and the world knows that efforts to create history does not change [reality]. Pakistan's name from the land of the pure [has changed] to pure terror. Pakistan is Terroristan. [It has harboured] Hafeez Sayyeed and Lashkar-e-Taiba. Its counter terrorism strategy has involved it being a haven to terrorists. It protects terrorists. Pakistan must understand that Jammu and Kashmir will always remain an integral part of India. However it ramps up terror, this will not change. Pakistan spoke of its supposed counter terrorism efforts, [but] having diverted international aid to infrastructure of terror, Pakistan is now talking of its suffering from terrorism. The world does not need lectures on democracy and human rights from a state defined as a failed state. Terroristan...if it is committed to civilisation the world may still understand."

Afghanistan responded to Pakistan in referring to "safe havens of terror in Pakistan. Pakistan diverts attention from [its] failure to take action against groups with sanctuaries in its territory. Those in Pakistan constitute the main source of instability to Afghanistan and the region. Efforts to this end, from this platform, have yielded nothing. Pakistan prevents a constructive approach to peace and stability in the region and the world. Where was Osama bin Laden killed? Near the capital, Islamabad. Where did Mullah Omar die? In an hospital in Karachi. Where was his successor Mullah Akhtar Mansour found and killed by foreign forces? Quetta in Pakistan. Which passport did he have to travel? Pakistan. From what country has almost every terrorist group entered Afghanistan? From Pakistan. Incessant support for extremist groups by Pakistan...[the] so-called civil war in Afghanistan has been so by the use of proxies for political purposes in Afghanistan. Now the time has come for Pakistan to adopt a constructive approach to promote peace in the region. Lastly Abbasi admitted in an interview a few days ago that the truck used in a bombing might have come from Pakistan to Afghanistan. We will use dialogue to ensure stability for our people. In this context, our resolve to defeat terrorism is unwavering, as is shown by our security forces everyday."

Pakistan then responded to India (and added a response to Afghanistan) by saying "that it is unfortunate India criticises Pakistan. The oppressed people of Kashmir [have suffered] by Indian occupation forces. The people of occupied Kashmir look to the international community to carry out a free and fair plebiscite to determine their future. The misconceptions India creates is such that only yesterday Indian forces on the Line of Control in Kashmir killed 10 people where many, including women, lost their lives. The strategy of offense-defense is flouted blatantly by India...[this] will never succeed. Commander Kulbhushan Yadav was caught red handed in Pakistan for spreading [propaganda] and espionage. For our Bangladesh brothers and sisters,...we have to come out of hate. The 1971 war issues were resolved by the signing of a tripartite agreement. We have to move on."
The representative then responded to Afghanistan in saying that "instead of blaming others, [they] should focus on eliminating terrorists in places it cannot control."

The session was then closed for the day by the president of the General Assembly.

=== 22 September ===
Morning schedule

- Cameroon – President Paul Biya
- Kiribati – President Taneti Maamau
- Central African Republic – President Faustin-Archange Touadéra
- Moldova – Prime Minister Pavel Filip
- Belgium – Prime Minister Charles Michel
- Bhutan – Prime Minister Tshering Tobgay
- Albania – Prime Minister Edi Rama
- Malta – Prime Minister Joseph Muscat
- Cape Verde – Prime Minister Ulisses Correia e Silva

Late morning session

- Vietnam – Deputy Prime Minister Phạm Bình Minh
- Saint Lucia – Prime Minister Allen Chastanet
- Saint Kitts and Nevis – Prime Minister Timothy Harris (Scheduled)
- Cape Verde – Prime Minister Ulisses Correia e Silva (Scheduled)
- Vietnam – (Scheduled)
- Cuba – Foreign Minister Bruno Eduardo Rodriguez Parrilla
- Tunisia – Foreign Minister Khemais Jhinaoui
- Thailand – Foreign Minister Don Pramudwinai
- Australia – Foreign Minister Julie Bishop
- Hungary – Foreign Minister Péter Szijjártó
- Algeria – Foreign Minister Abdelkader Messahel
- Kenya – Foreign Minister Amina Chawahir Mohamed
- Iceland – Foreign Minister Gudlaugur Thór Thórdarson
- Sweden – Foreign Minister Margot Wallström

Afternoon session

- Tonga – King Tupou VI
- Solomon Islands – Prime Minister Manasseh Sogavare
- Macedonia – President Zoran Zaev
- Ethiopia – Prime Minister Hailemariam Desalegn
- Andorra – Prime Minister Antoni Martí Petit
- Somalia – Prime Minister Hassan Ali Khaire
- Lesotho – Prime Minister Thomas Motsoahae Thabane
- Saint Vincent and the Grenadines – Deputy Prime Minister Louis Straker
- Cambodia – Foreign Minister Prak Sokhonn
- Belize – Foreign Minister Wilfred Elrington
- San Marino – Foreign Minister Nicola Renzi
- Liechtenstein – Foreign Minister Aurelia Frick
- Greece – Foreign Minister Nikos Kotzias
- Barbados – Foreign Minister Maxine Pamela Ometa McClean
- United Arab Emirates – Foreign Minister Sheikh Abdullah Bin Zayed Al Nahyan
- Sweden – (Scheduled)
- Mongolia – Foreign Minister Tsend Munkh-Orgil
- Benin – Prime Minister Pascal Irénée Koupaki
- Brunei – Foreign Minister Pehin Lim Jock Seng
- Malaysia – Prime Minister Dato' Sri Anifah Aman
- Sierra Leone – Foreign Minister Samura Matthew Wilson Kamara

==== Right of Reply ====
Serbia responded to Albania in saying that "as the General Assembly searches for numerous challenges the world is faced with...the same is for Serbia. In order to achieve this, Serbia seeks regional cooperation. We share the western Balkans working together. During the 72nd session of the General Assembly numerous dignitaries underlined sovereignty. Albania again used this august body to call for the independence of the Serbian southern province, so-called state of Kosovo. This is against the charter and the principles of the UN. [Rama] contended that the dialogue is between two states and not Belgrade and Pristina...outstanding issues are being addressed in Brussels by the European Union between Belgrade and Pristina. What the prime minister of Albania said may jeopardise the future. [Amongst] my government's priorities is to reach a solution that is acceptable to all taking into account all communities in Kosovo-Metohija. Kosovo is not independent nor a UN member state. Serbia will use all its means to protect its sovereignty and territorial integrity."

Qatar responded to the UAE (through a translator) in criticising the "allegations and false claims by the UAE against Qatar which faces an illegal siege and encroachment on its national sovereignty. [We] face an attempt to defame Qatar and trying to hurt its relations with other countries...[to] impose an unjust and unlawful siege. We face actions against our media. [This] violation of good neighbourliness and of the charter of the GCC is thus rejected by many countries. Many countries talked of the negative impact of the siege. The unity of our people [and] solidarity with countries around the world [will prevail]. We believe these measures hurt, [but] despite many attempts to defame Qatar, the international community knows the objective of this campaign. [It has] failed to prove what they sought. The record of Qatar in confronting terrorism is known to all and our partners in this fight. [It is] better than the record of those stating what is contrary to that. Qatar is also working through bilateral mechanisms to fight terror and dry up its source of funding. Whether freezing assets or prevent travelling...the state of Qatar will always be firm in confronting [terrorism]...we all bear collectively responsibility in the charter and [its] perspectives...respect for sovereignty and human rights. This is the best forum to defend international law. UAE must put an end to all violations perpetrated against Security Council such as in Libya. [This will be] leading to[wards] more terrorism as a result of failed policies."

Albania responded to Serbia's reply "in response to his excellency Edi Rama. We regret at this hour to take the stand but to set the record strait. Let me remind [them] that Kosovo is an independent state. Since 2008 Kosovo is recognised by [111] member states. [It] proved to be a contributor to peace. Kosovo is member of regional groups in south east Europe. It has signed cooperation deals with the EU and is working towards future EU membership. [This has] brought clear benefits and an improve[d] atmosphere in the region. Facilitate[d]...youth in particular. Based on this record, the UN and other groups only benefit by recognition of Kosovo. Based on what my prime minister Edi Rama said, [this] move[s] towards stability...[and is] good for all countries, Serbia included. Serbia and Kosovo engage in dialogue which brought the two countries together to engage issues for the good of its citizens. [This is the] best investment for them to work towards reconciliation. This is what both need...for peace and the future in Europe."

The UAE responded (through a translator) to Qatar's response in saying that "we regret to see the state of Qatar has once again sought to distract the representatives here. Four countries took measures against the state of Qatar claiming to fight terrorism, but [against] those [who] genuinely fight terrorism in line with international law...To break relations was not difficult but a direct response to Qatar's own actions which destabilise the region. The state that meddles in other Arab states. In point of fact, Qatar is in violation of international law and resolutions of the UN. We will continue with measures taken because we found no other way against Qatar's hostile actions. They can [either] choose to be a rogue state against international law or work in cooperation [with others]."

Egypt then also responded (through a translator) to Qatar in saying "we do not find it odd that the delegation of state of Qatar is using allegations to defend [itself]...Saudi Arabia, UAE and Bahrain are fed up and take measures to prevent the regime from interference in the internal affairs of others. As is known to all, Qatar supports terror in Syria, Iraq, Libya and others. This regime is financing terrorism; for instance, in Iraq they paid two terrorists a ransom; and this regime is also providing weapons to terrorists and providing them with a safe haven. [This includes] even giving Qatar nationality and not extraditing [personnel] per Security Council resolution[s]. [It] also [is] instigating terrorism in a very known way. [Its] terrorism support is explicit in the Security Council committee. The insistence [by] the regime to support terrorism is something we all reject. Its objection to go back [as a] right country...this is why the four countries acted with[in] international law...and the Qatar regime that fighting and countering terrorism is an obligation on all countries [and] is with[in] relevant resolutions."

Qatar then used its second Right of Reply in saying that it is "truly regrettable that the delegation of UAE would verbally attack Qatar. [It is] not surprising as an investigation of the hack of Qatar news agencies [showed]. [The] result shows the hacking happened from a nearby Gulf state. This crime with a campaign...and lies were continuation of this campaign. Everybody realises [this] was fabricated. Therefore, [it is] ironic the UAE speaks of confronting terrorism when some of its citizens participate[d] in the ugliest acts of terrorism in history."

The session was then closed for the day.

=== 23 September ===
Morning schedule

- Ireland – (Scheduled)
- Democratic Republic of the Congo – President Joseph Kabila Kabange
- South Sudan – First Vice President Taban Deng Gai
- Micronesia – First Vice President Yosiwo George
- Nepal – First Vice President Sher Bahadur Deuba
- Papua New Guinea – Prime Minister Peter Paire O'Neill
- Syria – Deputy Prime Minister Walid Muallem
- Dominica – Prime Minister Roosevelt Skerrit
- India – Foreign Minister Sushma Swaraj
- Djibouti – Foreign Minister Mahmoud Ali Youssouf
- Philippines – (Scheduled)
- Saudi Arabia – Foreign Minister Adel Ahmed Al-Jubeir
- Bahamas – Foreign Minister Darren Allen Henfield
- Philippines – Foreign Minister Alan Peter S. Cayetano
- Singapore – Foreign Minister Vivian Balakrishnan
- Bahrain – Foreign Minister Shaikh Khalid Bin Ahmed Al-Khalifa
- North Korea – (Scheduled)
- India – Foreign Minister Sushma Swaraj (Scheduled)
- Laos – Foreign Minister Saleumxay Kommasith
- Ireland – Communications Minister Denis Naughten
- Nepal – Prime Minister Sher Bahadur Deuba (Scheduled)
- South Sudan – First Vice President Taban Deng Gai (Scheduled)
- Democratic Republic of the Congo – President Joseph Kabila Kabange (Scheduled)
- North Korea – Foreign Minister Ri Yong Ho
- Iraq – Foreign Minister Ibrahim Abdulkarim Al-Jafari

Afternoon schedule

- Eritrea – Foreign Minister Osman Saleh Mohammed
- Jamaica – (Scheduled)
- Marshall Islands – (Scheduled)
- Grenada – ((Scheduled)
- Oman – ((Scheduled)
- Suriname – Foreign Minister Yldiz Pollack-Beighle
- Dominica – ((Scheduled)
- Maldives – ((Scheduled)
- Sudan – Foreign Minister Ibrahim Ahmed Abd al-Aziz Ghandour
- Marshall Islands – Foreign Minister John Silk
- Oman – Foreign Minister Yousef bin Alawi bin Abdullah
- Chad – ((Scheduled)
- Niger – ((Scheduled)
- Trinidad and Tobago – Foreign Minister Dennis Moses
- Chad – Foreign Minister Hissein Brahim Taha
- Jamaica – Foreign Minister Kamina Johnson Smith
- Maldives – Foreign Minister Mohamed Asim
- Burundi – Foreign Minister Alain Aimé Nyamitwe

Evening schedule

- Niger – Foreign Minister Ibrahim Yacoubou
- Grenada – Foreign Minister Elvin Nimrod
- Tanzania – Foreign Minister Augustine Phillip Mahiga
- Norway – Prime Minister Erna Solberg (Scheduled)
- Iraq – Prime Minister (Scheduled)
- Saint Kitts and Nevis – Prime Minister Mark Anthony Brantley

==== Right of Reply ====
Qatar responded (through a translator) to Saudi Arabia and Bahrain in saying "both delegations accuse Qatar of terrorism. Qatar has an excellent record in counter-terrorism and ranks high in that regard. The allegations [that] allude to a link between Qatar and terror are baseless. [This is an] unlawful campaign against Qatar, [including] with hacking and piracy. Other members used the same [excuse] and used religious rhetoric to strengthen the claims. These countries are now frustrated and used commercials means to bring pressure on Qatar. to Saudi Arabia, the state of Qatar has strengthened its resolve. In fora such as against the international terror fight, which countries like ours signed, [a] deal [was struck] to stop funding terrorism. To countries that accuse Qatar of supporting terrorism, we say you need to follow our example. The state of Qatar fully follows Security Council resolutions. [we play a]constructive role [for] peace and humanitarian assistance. This paves way to stability and root out terrorism.
To Bahrain, a number of contradictions [have been made]. It is surprising the representative of Bahrain...that criticises Qatar used to commend Qatar. What Bahrain is experiencing has a stability effect on the region....counter to our excellent record. It is surprising Bahrain is accusing us of terrorism. We call upon the kingdom of Bahrain to work tirelessly to overcome problems it is facing [and] to support huamn rights. [They should] refrain from marginalising the rule of law. The [accusation against the] state of Qatar [seeks] to obscure internal problems Bahrain is facing [and] will not yield to any resolve. [The accusations] against Qatar are unacceptable. Is it conceivable to prevent students from attending studies? Is it not tagainst human rights? What about legislating laws that put pressure on any citizens that just express sympathy with Qatar...[it is] this rhetoric that fuels the campaign against Qatar."

Pakistan responded to India in saying that India had "indulged in an orgy of slander against my country. The comments to Pakistan betrays the hostility the leadership has to[wards] Pakistan. [This] hostility [we have] endured for 70 long years. In her vitriol, the Indian foreign minister deliberately ignored the issue of Jammu and Kashmir. Let me be clear, Kashmir is not a part of India; it is recognised by the UN as disputed territory. I invite you to look at UN maps. In over dozen resolutions the UN has resolved to let the people of Jammu and Kashmir decide their destiny through a plebiscite. India accepts the resolutions but obfuscates. Women and men have been shot dead [in Kashmir]. Today violence continues with pellet guns [resulting in] children being shot. Everyday people come out to protest. If the parties do not resolve [their issues], the UN has not only the right but an obligation to help resolve dispute. In the case of Jammu and Kashmir, this is explicit since the Security Council has been involved in how the situation should be resolved. Resolutions have no expiry date. Law has not expiry date...India has not morality against the Security Council. India now also refuses bilateral dialogue with Pakistan, either composite or comprehensive. Violence emanates first and formeost from Indian repression of Kashmir. My prime minister proposed [to the] secretary-general [that he] should appoint a special envoy to promote the specifics of the resolutions. In the meantime, [one] should take steps...[such as to] de-list draconian emergency laws and punish those respoinsible for the genocide in Kashmir. If India want to avoid conflict with Pakistan...[it] must end ceasefire violations. [It] must halt support for terrorist groups inside Pakistan. India speaks a lot about terror, [but the] UN should define terrorism, includ[ing] state terrorism. What India's national security advisor boasted against spy agencies in [his] country...Pakistan has in its custody the Indian spy Kulbushan Yadav who confessed to terrorist activities in my country. In fact, it sponsored and perpetrates terrorism and commits aggression against all its neighbours. [It] supports subversion in Pakistan. All [this] proves [is that] India is the mother of terrorists in South Asia. In 70 years of independence, India engaged in over dozen use[s] of force; and it has over 17 insurgencies in its own land. The Indian foreign minister sought to denigrate the founding father of my country, Muhammed Ali Jinnah...[it is ironic coming from a] regime that has the blood of thousands of Muslims in Gujurat...today India is...ruled by a regime who is fascist. [It is being ruled] by the RSS, the same group that assassinated Gandhi. [It has] appointed a fanatic in its largest state. [Its] government allows the lynching of Muslims. [This is] amply documented by human rights organisations. As indeed one of India's biggest authors wrote, and I quote, 'dalits, adivasis await repression' and 'much of the terror in Kashmir.' [It is ironic that] the foreign minister talks of human rights, who is using pellet guns [that are] blinding children? Who is using terrorism against not only Kashmir but hundreds of Indians? Who is using [this] to crush [and ruin] in occupied Jammu and Kashmir. In conclusion, Pakistan remains open to resume [a] comprehensive dialogue to resolve all outstanding issues, including Kashmir. But [sic] dialogue must be against [the] campaign of [its] state-sponsored terrorism in Pakistan."

Bahrain responded (through a translator) to Qatar in saying that "in response to Qatar's allegations...Saudi Arabia, [the] UAE, Egypt and [are] supported by several [other] countries. These four countries practice [their[ sovereign right in accordance with legal and international practices to impose measures on Qatar because it violated resolutions that state when violations [occur in] one part, then the whole resolution [is violated]. Qatar interfered in the kingdom [of Bahrain] to create chaos. [It] threat[ens the] fabric of Bahrain by giving nationality to many Bahraini families. [It is] also trying since the beginning of [the] boycott measures taken by the four countries by spreading [and] violat[ing] human rights. Although Qatar knows, the kingdom of Bahrain ha[s] taken measures in order to make sure all humanitarian cases are taken under consideration whether for studies or health. The measures by the four countries are sovereign measures, the right of any country under international law. These allegations of boycott is refuted by Qatar [what the] other [state] claims when they talk of economic growth. It is their right however, but they should behave in [such a] way and [they should not] behave in a[n] uncooperative [manner]. Qatar [is] trying to exploit international fora for its [own] interests. Bahrain [has] suffered as Qatar [has] not take[n up the spirit of] good neighhbourliness. We have good ties, family ties [with Qatar]. However, Qatar [is] supporting instability in Bahrain through financing terrorist group... or through [its] media to spread false news in order to create chaos[...,]with more than 800 false news [reports. And [sic] it is hiding behind freedom of expression and freedom of [the] media. [Conversely] Bahrain long respects free media. Democracy [is] in Bahrain. We have a fully elected parliament and [we] let [our] parliament carry out its work. Therefore, all these achievements [that] are non existent in Qatar...their constitution has no parliament. [We do] not interfere, it is their choice. However, [we] believe [that the] reform process is part of a democratic process. [We would like to] remind our brethren in Qatar [that it is] easy to criticise others, but [one] should first look at yourself."

Qatar then used its second Right of Reply to respond (through a translator) to Bahrain in saying that it is "regrettable for Bahrain to launch an attack on Qatar. These false llegations [up]on Qatar [are also] unjust measures on Qatar. [They] amount to a violation of human rights and the right of expressing opinions. [This] also runs counter to counter-terrorism based on human rights. One cannot fight terror without respect for human rights. [The group of four aforementioned Arab states] accuse[s us] of terror but [has provided] no evidence; these four [member states] provide no evidence as none is there. Qatar is better than all four [states] in the field of counter-terrorism. The[y] are against human rights, includ[ing] le[a]d[ing] to [a] cut in family ties. Any allegation [that] Qatar interefered in the internal of these countries are false. Indeed, [it is] obscuring these countries interefer[ing] in our internal affairs. [This] campaign threaten the unity of Qatar. These countries [need to] pay attention to their own unity and human rights. To ensure the stability of the [Persian] Gulf [Arab states] we need the cooperation of Gulf states. As [we are] not able to take a third right of reply, [we would] like to present further comments in writing."

The session was then closed for the day by the president of the General Assembly.

=== 25 September ===
Morning schedule

- Uruguay – Foreign Minister Rodolfo Nin Novoa
- Venezuela – (Scheduled)
- Holy See – Secretary for Relations with States Paul Richard Gallagher
- Mozambique – Permanent Representative Antonio Gumande
- Angola – Permanent Representative Ismael A. Gaspar Martins
- New Zealand – Permanent Representative Craig Hawke
- Turkmenistan – Permanent Representative Aksoltan Ataeva
- Peru – Permanent Representative Gustavo Meza-Cuadra
- Nicaragua – (Scheduled)
- Venezuela – Foreign Minister Jorge Arreaza Montserrat
- Norway – Prime Minister Erna Solberg (Scheduled)
- Norway – Permanent Representative Tore Hattrem
- Timor-Leste – Permanent Representative Maria Helena Pires
- Nicaragua – Permanent Representative María Rubiales de Chamorro
- United Nations – 72nd Session of the United Nations General Assembly - President Miroslav Lajcak (Closing statement)

==== Right to Reply ====
Myanmar responded to "irresponsible comments. It is regrettable of the comments [in regards to] Rakhine state [sic]. [The term] genocide should not be used easily. Let me be clear, [there is] no ethnic cleansing, no genocide. We will do everything to prevent ethnic cleansing. We will not dwell...as our vice president has already spoken...We condemn all such violations. We condemn the attack on the police station....[even] the highest Islamic organisation in Myanmar has also condemned the attack. [It is] not just Muslim...most of the world is unaware of the plight of [Muslim], Buddhist and Hindu groups [in the country]. [The] evil nature of terrorist groups was revealed yesterday when Hindu groups were attacked. Today 93 bodies were revealed when Hindu villages were attacked. We must stand together...most [people] were forced to flee. Many villagers were forces to flee to Bangladesh so as to exploit international attention. Villages though to be with the government have been under attack. The government is striving...to ensure aid is being received...[so] too [are] humanitarian organisations. Aid [is] provided [by]...[the Red Cross movement. We [are] discussing with ASEAN to provide much needed assistance in Rakhine state [sic]. The government is fully coommitted to aid in Rakhine state [sic]....Met with Aung San Suu Kyi...The government is setting up a visit to Rakhine on September to help understand [the] situation on the ground. [We are] also reaching out to Bangladesh [resolve he situation]." (Note: In late 2017, an agreement was reached for the repatriation of Rohingya refugees through early 2018.)

Iran responded (through a translator) to Saudi Arabia and UAE in saying that "on Friday (22 September) [they] made several unfounded allegations to Iran...and [they are responsible] for spreading taqfiri terrorism. Saudi Arabia and UAE have the audacity to accuse Iran of spreading terrorism and [being] against interference in the internal affairs [of other countries...[It is they who are] against [the] basic human rights of [the] Bahraini people. [That] regime seeks to stop [the] human rights of the Bahraini people. Let me conclude [in saying that]...[this is] against the rights of [Persian] Gulf people."

Indonesia respond to comments from the "Republic of Vanuatu, Saint Vincent and the Grenadines (amongst others)...against the people of West Papua. Time and again [these] false accusation are thrown at us. These countries...refuse to understand. [West] Papua has been through massive progress... [including] infrastructure build[ing by my government,... as well as providing] basic healthcare, free education...with [an] economy growing...[this] makes [it the] fastest growing region in Indonesia. [We] will always remember [this region as] remaining a part of Indonesia. If human rights are at the heart of issues, why [is it] not raised in an appropriate forum [such as] the Human Rights Council. If Indonesia has to hide in this day and age of information technology [it] will be known...This [is not a] way to hide from ones own domestic problems. Such actions are illegal and should not condone in principle the UN Charter. [It] cannot [be] accept[ed]...Indonesia rejects [this]. [To] conclude, with loosely translat[ing], [we] slap the bucket of water [and] will slap on [the] face."

India responded to Pakistan's response from the previous day in saying that "on Saturday 23 September, [the delegate] she callously [responded] did with a picture of a girl from Palestine. taken by photographer Heidi Levine...the permanent representative of Pakistan misled this Assembly by displaying this picture to spread falsehood about India. A fake picture to push a completely false narrative....Umar Fayaz was kidnapped and brutally tortured by Pakistan. This is the true picture of [a] harsh reality...especially [what] Jammu and Kashmir sees everyday. [This is the] true face of Pakistan [and] is not hidden from anyone."

UAE responded (through a translator) to Iran in saying "the three isles (Greater and Lesser Tunbs and Abu Musa) [is an] integral part of [the] UAE. [We] categorically reject [these] allegations...especially to use the ICJ...[to] cannot interfere in the internal affairs of the region...Iran seeks to import terrorism to other countries of the region. The Islamic republic of Iran is supporting terrorism in Lebanon and Yemen. This (UN) organisation's legality and legitimacy is respected in my country...in Yemen...to emerge from crisis...[Iran must respect] and GCC resolutions. Iran has...ammunition sent illegally to that country (Yemen)...as well [as] Security Council resolutions, [such as] 2231...proves that Iran has [an] expansionist role in the regions...[it] threatens Yemen...to not just Houthis but other groups who are loyal to former President Salah...[we] call on [them] to seize [such activities]."

Bahrain responded to Iran in saying Iran "[commits] human right against its own people. The Iranian regime shows clearly [that is] violate[s such principles]...against the world. [We] condemn [the] hateful actions taken by Iran in support of terrorism...[and] intervention in [the internarl] affairs [of other countries.

Pakistan then used its "second Right of Reply" to say that "no matter how many times...[India] cannot divert attention. [The] real issue...[related to those being] raped everyday by Indian occupation forces...[it has] backfired [and] does not hide...[it is] seeking to hide behind a photo[graph]? Thousands of pictures to prove [its] terrorism. Let me tell you, Mister president, [the] Kashmiris will never give up...just like the people of Palestine, [they] will never give up...[we] ask the world body to act. No woman is [oppressed] again...Kashmiri[s] will continue to rise [up] again and again. The ideology of the RSS...which is now [a] part of the ruling regime...Hundreds [have been] raped everyday in India...Christians and Muslims...funding terrorism...in Pakistan...we caught Kulbhushan Yadav red-handed and will continue to bring [the same] others."

==== Closing remarks ====
President Miroslav Lajcak summarised the statement from the podium (usually the president's closing remarks are from his chair), including in saying that for the first time "all 196 members" (Note: There are 193 members states, two Observer member states (Holy See and Palestine) and the European Union.) had taken to the podium.

== See also ==
- List of UN General Assembly sessions
- List of General debates of the United Nations General Assembly
