= Miroslav Lajčák =

Slovak politician and diplomat (born 1963)

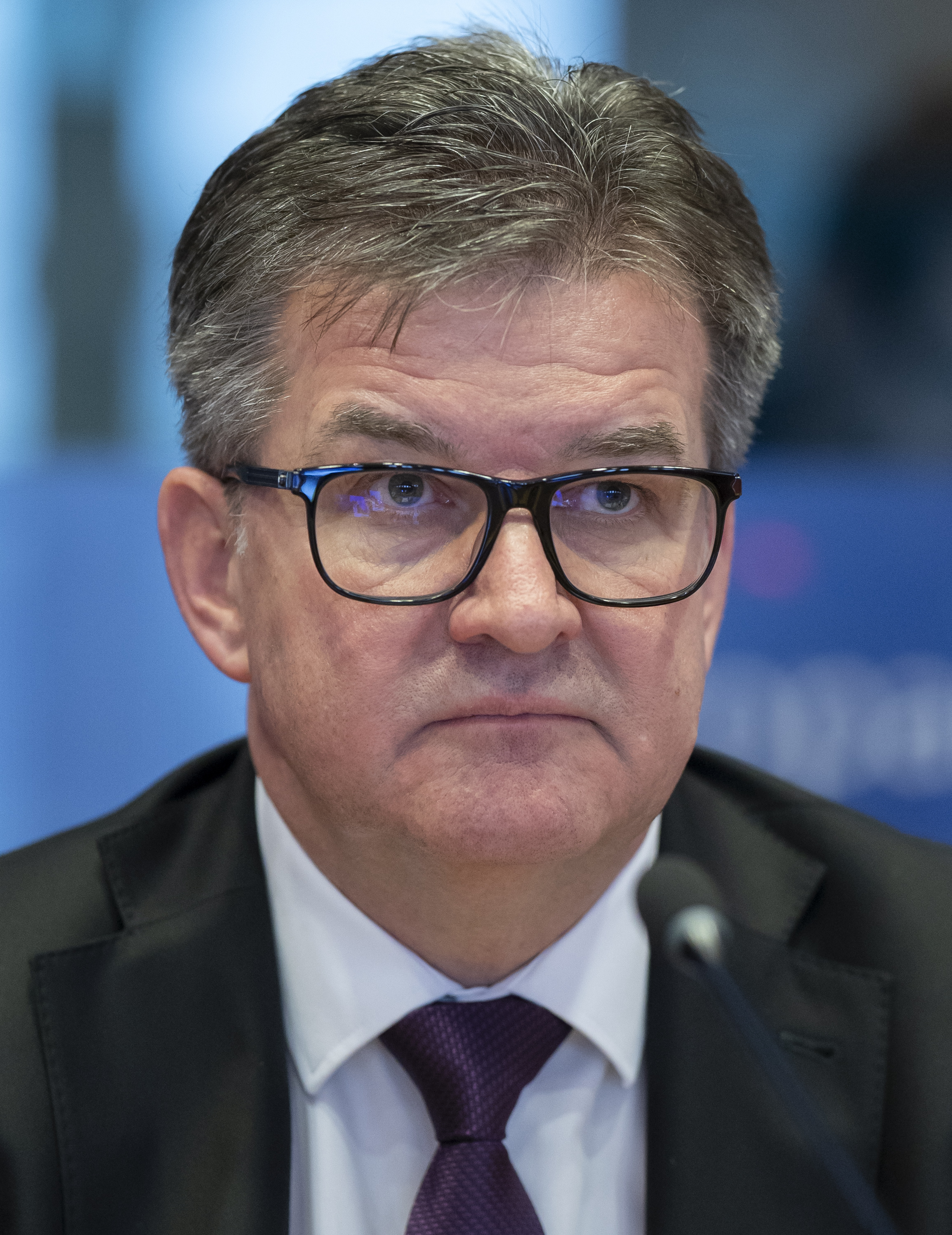
- Lajčák in 2025

President of the United Nations General Assembly
- In office 12 September 2017 – 19 September 2018
- Preceded by: Peter Thomson
- Succeeded by: María Fernanda Espinosa

Minister of Foreign Affairs
- In office 4 April 2012 – 20 March 2020
- Prime Minister: Robert Fico; Peter Pellegrini
- Preceded by: Mikuláš Dzurinda
- Succeeded by: Ivan Korčok
- In office 26 January 2009 – 8 July 2010
- Prime Minister: Robert Fico
- Preceded by: Ján Kubiš
- Succeeded by: Mikuláš Dzurinda

High Representative for Bosnia and Herzegovina
- In office 2 July 2007 – 26 March 2009
- Preceded by: Christian Schwarz-Schilling
- Succeeded by: Valentin Inzko

European Union Special Representative for Bosnia and Herzegovina
- In office 1 July 2007 – 28 February 2009
- Preceded by: Christian Schwarz-Schilling
- Succeeded by: Valentin Inzko
Additional positions
Advisor to the Prime Minister on the Western Balkans and National Security
In office 1 April 2025 – 31 January 2026
Preceded by	Office established
EU Special Representative for the Belgrade-Pristina Dialogue and other Western Balkan regional issues
In office 2 April 2020 – 31 January 2025
Preceded by	Office established
Succeeded by	Peter Sørensen
Chairperson-in-Office of the Organization for Security and Co-operation in Europe
In office 1 January 2019 – 1 January 2020
Preceded by	Enzo Moavero Milanesi
Succeeded by	Edi Rama

Personal details
- Born: 20 March 1963 (age 63) Poprad, Czechoslovakia (now Slovakia)
- Party: Communist Party (1983–1990); Direction - Social Democracy (associated non-member)
- Spouse: Jarmila Lajčáková-Hargašová
- Children: 3, including Vanesa
- Education: Comenius University in Bratislava, Faculty of Law; Moscow State Institute of International Relations

Miroslav Lajčák (born 20 March 1963) is a Slovak politician and diplomat who held the office of Minister of Foreign Affairs of the Slovak Republic from 2009 to 2010 and again from 2012 to 2020, serving across three different governments led by Robert Fico and one government led by Peter Pellegrini. In addition, Lajčák also served as President of the United Nations General Assembly for the 72nd session from 2017 until 2018.

A key figure in the mediation of the post-conflict crises in the Western Balkans, Lajčák acted as Executive Assistant to the UN Secretary-General's Special Envoy for the Balkans from 1999 to 2001. He negotiated, organized and supervised the referendum on the independence of Montenegro in 2006 on behalf of the European Union.

From 2007 to 2009, Lajčák led the mission as High Representative of the International Community and European Union Special Representative in Bosnia and Herzegovina. During his tenure, Bosnia and Herzegovina signed the landmark Stabilization and Association Agreement with the European Union.

From 2020 to 2025, Lajčák oversaw the Belgrade-Pristina Dialogue and other Western Balkan regional issues as the EU Special Representative. Since 2025, he acted as advisor to Slovak Prime Minister Robert Fico for foreign affairs and national security.

In late 2025 and early 2026, the release of the "Epstein files" by the U.S. Department of Justice triggered a major political scandal in Slovakia. Documents revealed extensive correspondence between Lajčák and convicted child sex offender Jeffrey Epstein from 2017 to 2019, including reports that Lajčák wanted to be introduced to "young girls", expressed a desire to participate in Epstein's private "games" and discussed strategic political interests with Epstein's network. While photographs confirmed their personal connection, Lajčák maintained that the interactions were strictly professional and routine for his diplomatic duties.

On 31 January 2026, following a joint statement from opposition politicians calling for his departure, and mounting pressure from the media, Lajčák submitted his resignation, which Fico accepted.

== Biography ==
=== Early life and education ===
Lajčák attended primary school in Stará Ľubovňa. In 1977 his family moved to Bratislava, where he enrolled in grammar school on Bilíková Street. He finished the final year of his secondary education at grammar school in Banská Štiavnica. Later he studied law at the Comenius University in Bratislava for a year before he obtained a master's degree in international relations from the Moscow State Institute of International Relations (MGIMO). As a student, he joined the Communist Party of Czechoslovakia. He also studied at the George C. Marshall European Center for Security Studies in Garmisch-Partenkirchen, Germany.

=== Diplomatic career (1988–2005) ===
A member of the Communist Party, Lajčák joined the Czechoslovak foreign ministry in 1988. Between 1991 and 1993 Lajčák was posted to the Czechoslovak and subsequently Slovak embassy in Moscow.

Upon his return to Slovakia in 1993 to the newly established Ministry of Foreign Affairs of Slovakia, he took an active part in forming the national Foreign Service. He became Director of the Cabinet of the Foreign Minister and later on Director of the Cabinet of the Prime Minister Jozef Moravčík.

In 1994, he was appointed Slovak Ambassador to Japan, becoming the youngest-ever Head of Diplomatic Mission of Slovakia. At the age of 31, he was also the youngest foreign ambassador in Japan. In 1998 after his posting to Japan he returned to the Foreign Ministry to become for the second time Director of Slovakia Foreign Minister's Cabinet.

His international engagements started in 1999 when he served as the Executive Assistant to the United Nations Secretary–General ́s Special Envoy for the Balkans, Eduard Kukan (until 2001).

Between 2001 and 2005, Lajčák was based in Belgrade as Slovakia's Ambassador to the Federal Republic of Yugoslavia (later Serbia and Montenegro), with accreditation also to Albania and the Republic of Macedonia.

Following his term in Belgrade, he was named Political Director at the Foreign Ministry of Slovakia (2005–2007).

=== Supervisor of Montenegro's independence referendum (2005) ===
In 2005 the EU diplomacy chief Javier Solana called Lajčák to supervise the 2006 Montenegrin independence referendum, which was approved with a 55.5% of favourable votes.

=== International High Representative for Bosnia and Herzegovina (2007–2009) ===
On 1 July 2007, Solana again chose Lajčák to succeed Christian Schwarz-Schilling as the double-hatted High Representative for Bosnia and Herzegovina/EU Special Representative for Bosnia and Herzegovina (OHR/EUSR). With a mandate from the UN Security Council, he liaised regularly with the United Nations and reported periodically to the Security Council. During his tenure, BiH signed the Stabilization and Association Agreement with the EU, the most remarkable integration success of the country for many years to come. He also launched activities to reach out to the population including speaking tours and a website for dialogue with citizens.

He was soon acclaimed as "person of the year" by both Banja Luka-based Nezavisne novine and Sarajevo-based Dnevni Avaz dailies.

Lajčák acted in 2007–09 in line with a moderately strong role of the OHR (using Bonn powers more than Schwarz-Schilling but less than Paddy Ashdown); critics of the international supervision of Bosnia and Herzegovina, including David Chandler, pointed to his "authoritarian stance" as responsible for creating a further crisis by trying to impose major institutional change and alter the Dayton peace agreement framework without domestic ownership or legitimacy. Lajčák is deemed to have achieved results on the ground but at the price of endangering the credibility of EU conditionality by accepting merely cosmetic legal changes. He left BiH in January 2009 after being nominated to serve as Minister of Foreign Affairs of Slovakia.

Lajčák did resort to the use of the Bonn Powers in the crisis related to the 2007 Law on the Council of Ministers, which caused a showdown with Milorad Dodik's SNSD. The law, aimed at revising decision-making procedures to make the BiH government less prone to blockages, triggered the resignation of the Bosnian prime minister Nikola Špirić (SNSD) and withdrawal of Bosnian Serbs from state institutions. The OHR then published an "authentic interpretation" of the law, claiming that it did not intend to change the composition of the Council of Ministers. Lajčák also removed RS police officials deemed complicit in war crimes. Upon instructions of Solana, Lajčák contented himself of cosmetic changes to bring to an end the police reform saga, leading to the signature of the Stabilisation and Association Agreement between Bosnia and Herzegovina and the EU in June 2008, despite claims that the EU had lost his credibility by lowering the bar which had been set by Paddy Ashdown in 2005.

=== Minister of Foreign Affairs of Slovakia (2009–2010, 2012–2020) ===
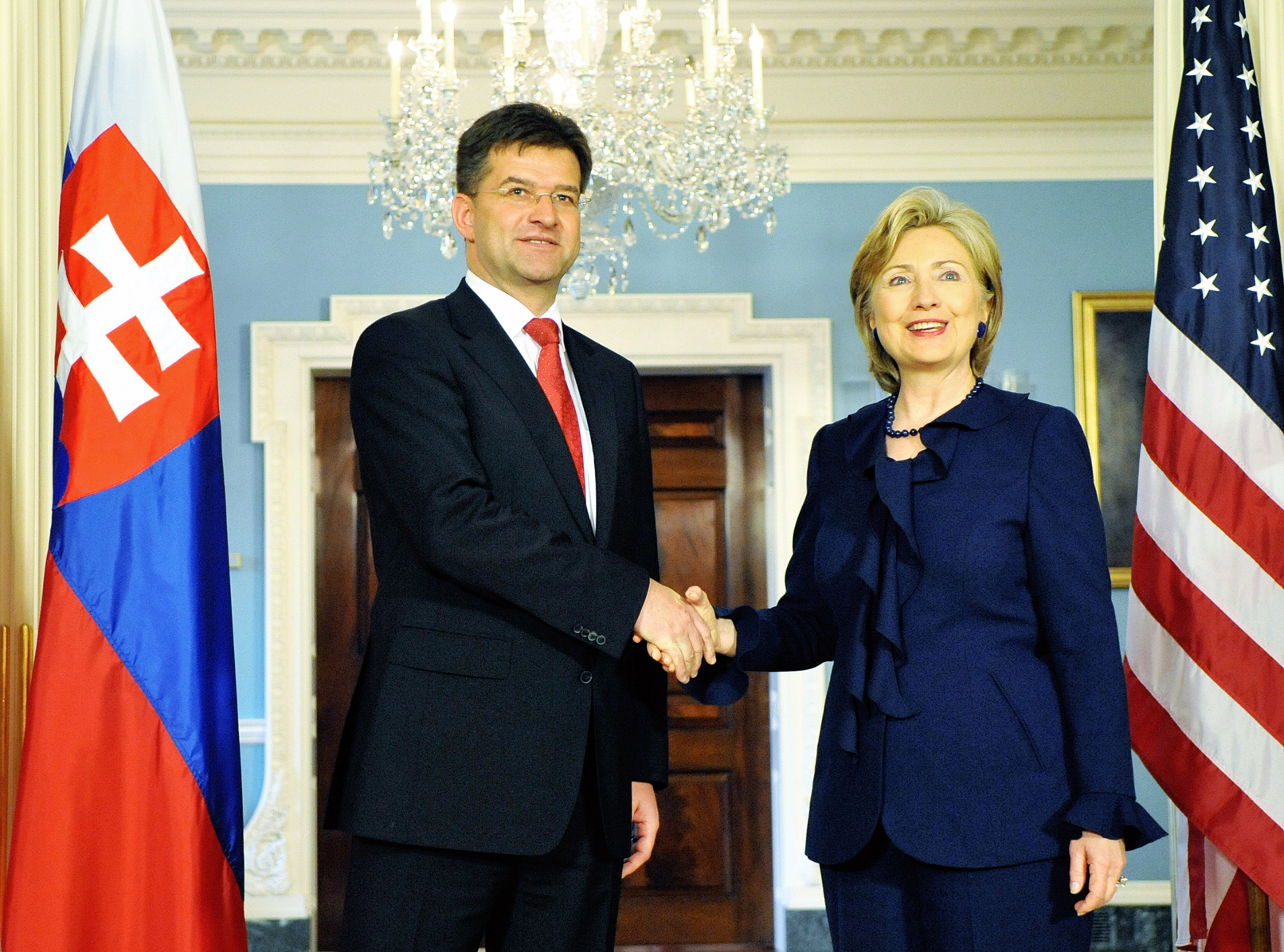
Lajčák with U.S. Secretary of State Hillary Clinton in Washington, D.C., May 2009

From 26 January 2009 until July 2010, Lajčák served as Minister of Foreign Affairs in Robert Fico's First Cabinet.

From December 2010 to April 2012 Lajčák served as managing director for Europe and Central Asia in the EU's External Action Service.

In April 2012 Lajčák was appointed again, as an independent, to the post of foreign minister and deputy prime minister in Robert Fico's Second Cabinet. In addition, he became Chairman of the Government's Council for Human Rights, National Minorities and Gender Equality.

After the 2014 Bosnian general election, he encouraged Dodik's SNSD party to enter the government coalition, despite having lost the Presidency seat, claiming that "new authorities must have legitimacy."

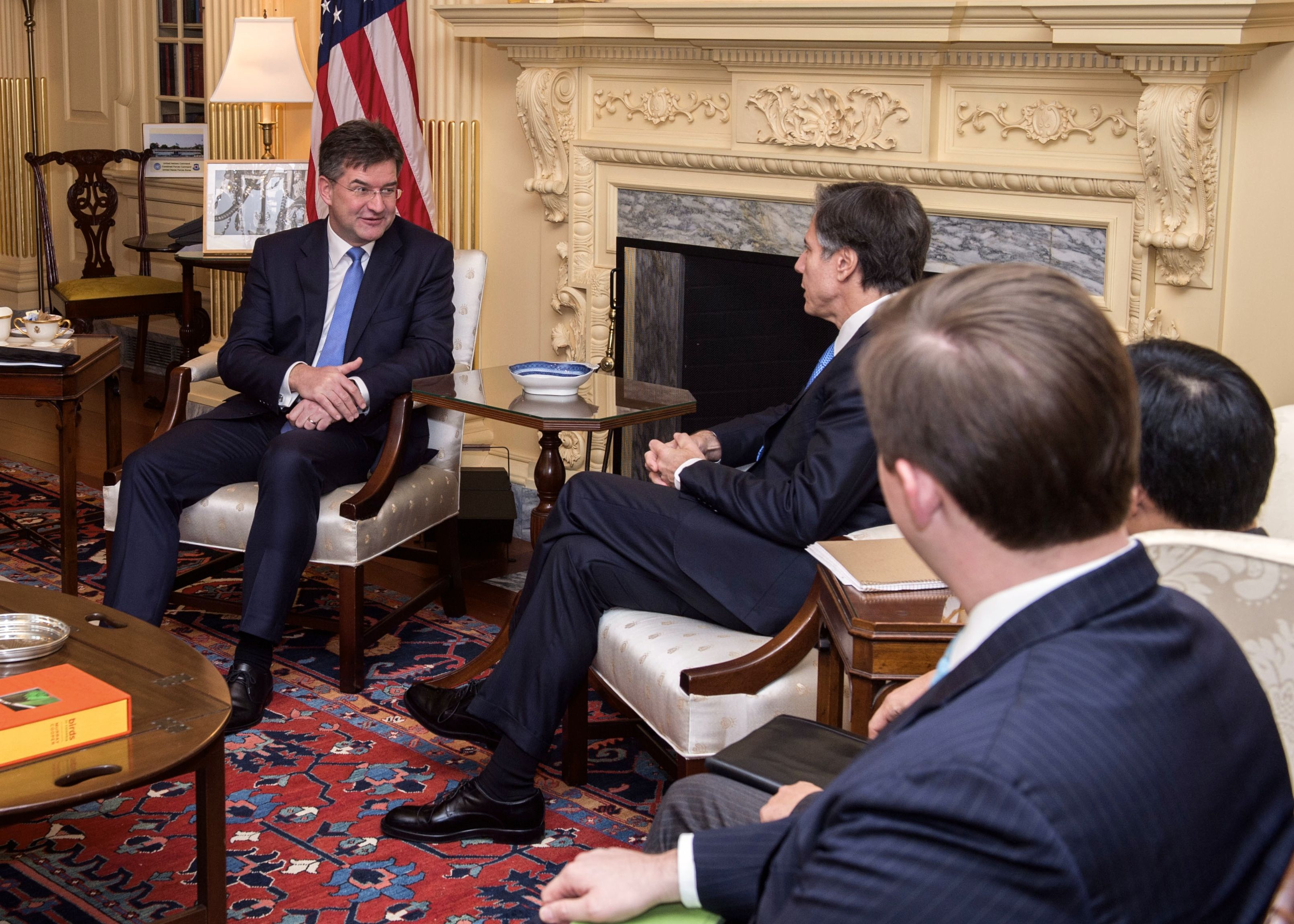
Lajčák with U.S. Deputy Secretary of State Antony Blinken in Washington, D.C., December 17, 2015

After the annexation of Crimea by the Russian Federation, in May 2014, he visited Moscow and met with the Russian foreign minister Sergey Lavrov and deputy prime minister Dmitry Rogozin. Rogozin and Lajčák were co-chairs of a joint Slovak-Russian cooperation body.

In November 2015 Slovakia voted against Kosovo's membership in UNESCO. Lajčák later explained that Slovakia wanted Belgrade and Pristina to interpret it as a message, that the international community expects parties to submit such proposals on the basis of mutual agreement and consent. "Our interest is to strengthen the dialogue. One of the reasons why we took a negative attitude is that the issue was not the subject of the dialogue and we are afraid it could worsen it," he added.

In 2016 Lajčák called on the EU to abandon its "ideological" approach to Russia.

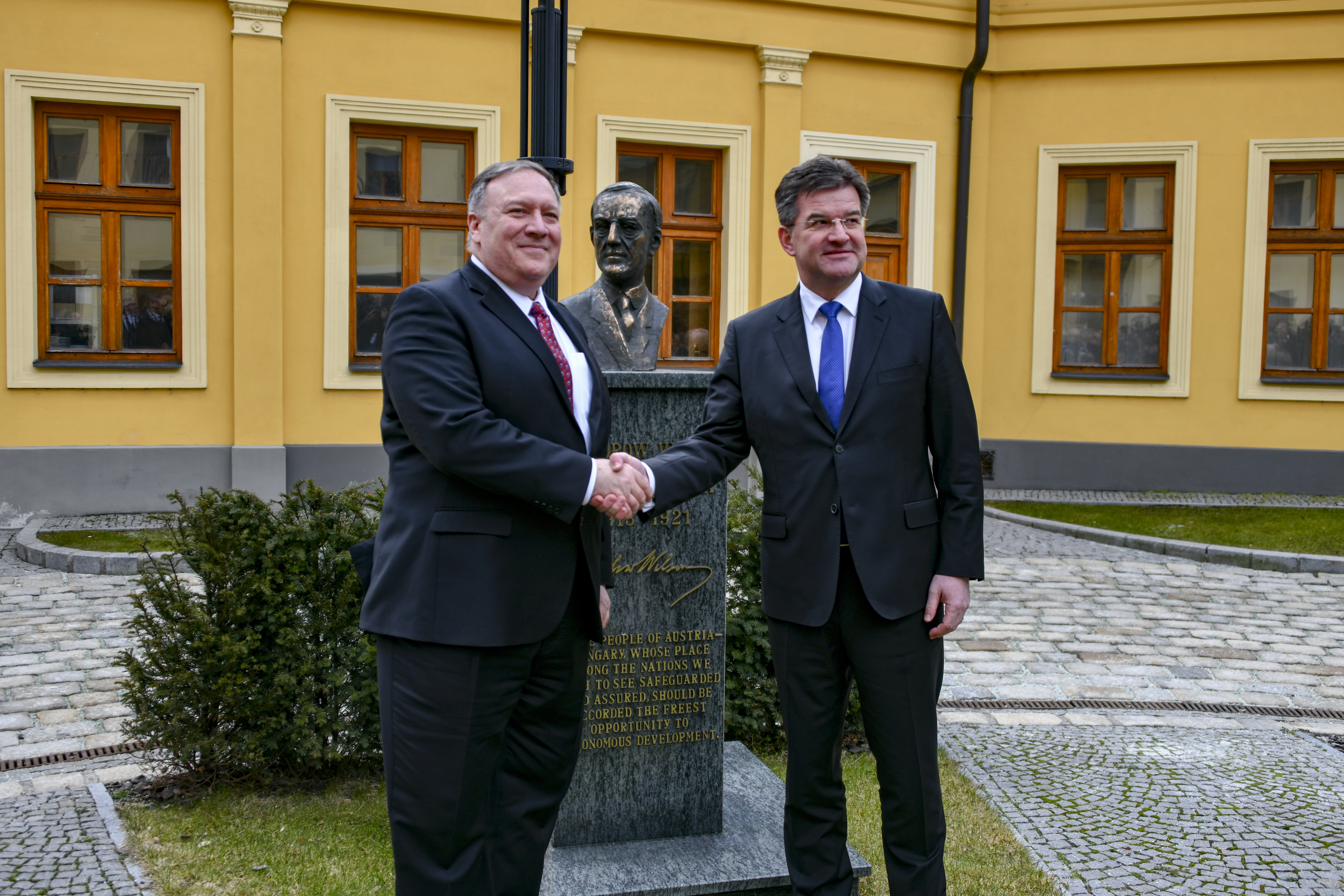
Lajčák with U.S. Secretary of State Mike Pompeo in Bratislava, February 2019

In October 2018, he threatened to freeze relations with Vietnam over the case of a Vietnamese businessman who was kidnapped by Vietnamese agents and smuggled back home through Slovakia.

In November 2018, Lajčák lambasted as "anti-democratic" the proposed Kosovo–Serbia land swap and cautioned against the regional repercussions of such a proposal.

In November 2018, Lajčák announced that he would contemplate his resignation if the parliament rejected the Global Compact for Migration. On 29 November 2018, after the parliament had voted to refuse the compact, the Foreign Affairs Minister decided to resign, but later withdrew his resignation.

Since 2019, Lajčák has been serving on the Transatlantic Task Force of the German Marshall Fund and the Bundeskanzler-Helmut-Schmidt-Stiftung (BKHS), co-chaired by Karen Donfried and Wolfgang Ischinger.

Between the EU-facilitated 5 August political agreement and the December breakthrough on a new SNSD-led government, on 27 Oct 2019, Lajčák invited both Milorad Dodik and Dragan Čović to Bratislava for "international mediation" which paved the way for BiH adopting its ANP with NATO.

Lajčák announced in November 2019 that he would leave Slovak politics following the 2020 Slovak parliamentary election.

=== EEAS Managing Director for Europe and Central Asia (2010–2012) ===
From 2010 to 2012, Lajčák helped shape the newly formed diplomatic service of the European Union, the European External Action Service, as its managing director for Europe and Central Asia. In addition, he also served as the EU's Chief Negotiator for the Ukraine–European Union Association Agreement and Moldova–European Union Association Agreement, as well as the EU Representative for the 5+2 Talks on the Transnistrian Settlement Process.

=== Slovak Presidency of the Council of the EU (2016) ===
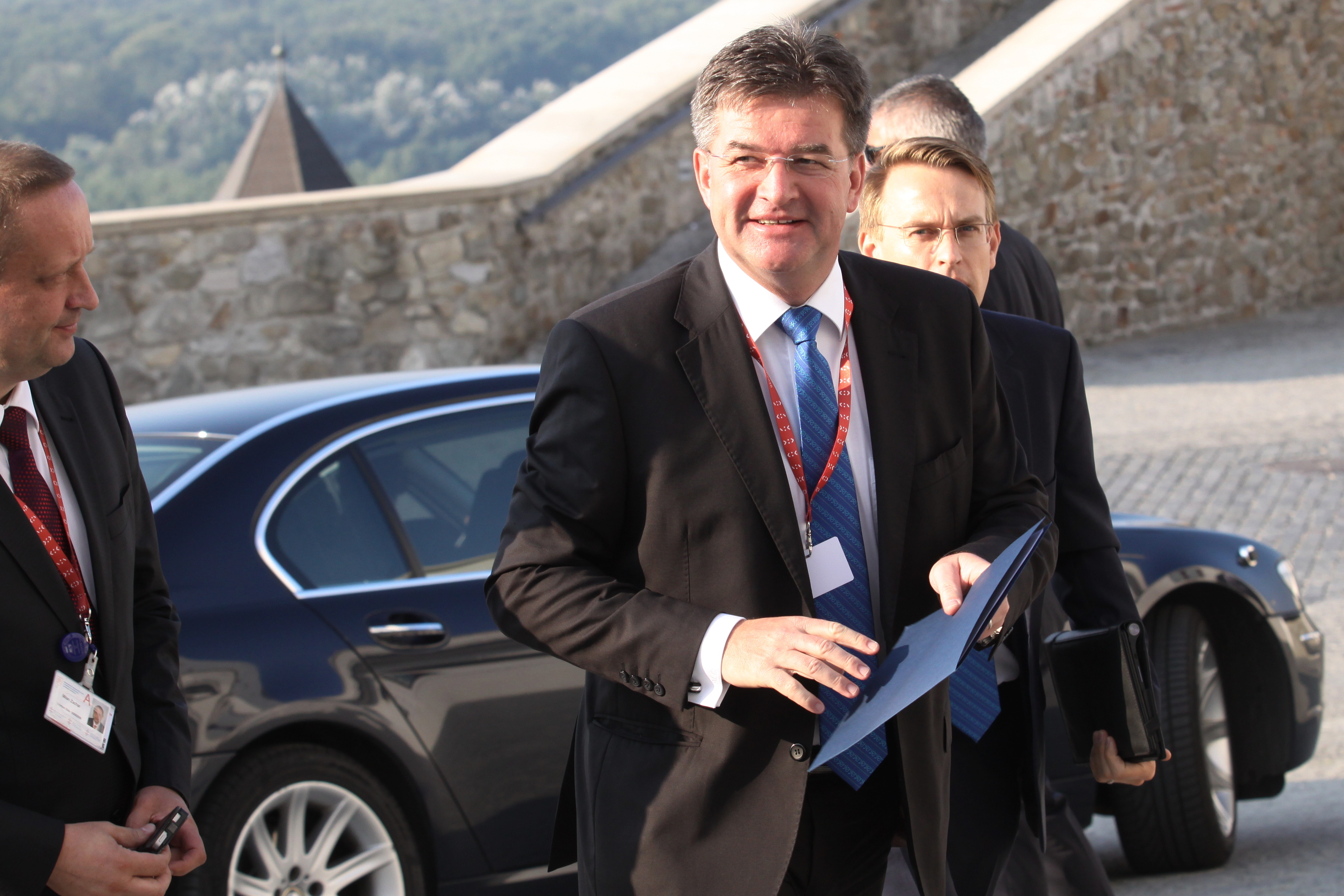
Miroslav Lajčák at the Bratislava Summit during Slovakia's EU presidency, September 2016

In June 2016, Slovakia took over the Presidency of the EU Council. In his speech presenting the priorities for the Slovak Presidency Lajčák said "Today, we call the EU our home, the euro our currency and Schengen our area. The Presidency is the culmination of our integration journey. We are at the core of Europe. And we are grateful for that because we were given a lot. It's time to give back."

In November 2016, following revelations by a whistleblower, Transparency International Slovakia accused Lajčák of dubious procurement contracts during the Slovak EU Council Presidency. The accusation was never proven.

=== Candidacy for UN Secretary-General (2016) ===
The candidacy of Lajčák for the position of Secretary-General of the United Nations was officially launched following his formal nomination by the Government of Slovakia on May 25, 2016. Positioned as a representative of the Eastern European Group, Lajčák's campaign sought to fulfill the principle of regional rotation, as Eastern Europe remained the only regional bloc yet to hold the office. His platform emphasized a commitment to multilateralism, conflict prevention, and a comprehensive reform of the UN Secretariat to increase organizational efficiency.

Throughout the 2016 selection process, Lajčák participated in public hearings and televised debates designed to improve transparency. After a series of informal straw polls by the UN Security Council, his bid reached a peak in the final round on October 5, 2016, finishing in second place behind António Guterres. Lajčák secured 7 "encourage" votes, 6 "discourage" votes, and 2 "no opinion" votes, marking the highest finish for any candidate from the Eastern European bloc during that cycle.

While the Security Council ultimately moved to appoint Guterres, the visibility gained during the campaign led to Lajčák's successful election as President of the 72nd UN General Assembly the following year.

=== President of the UN General Assembly (2017–2018) ===
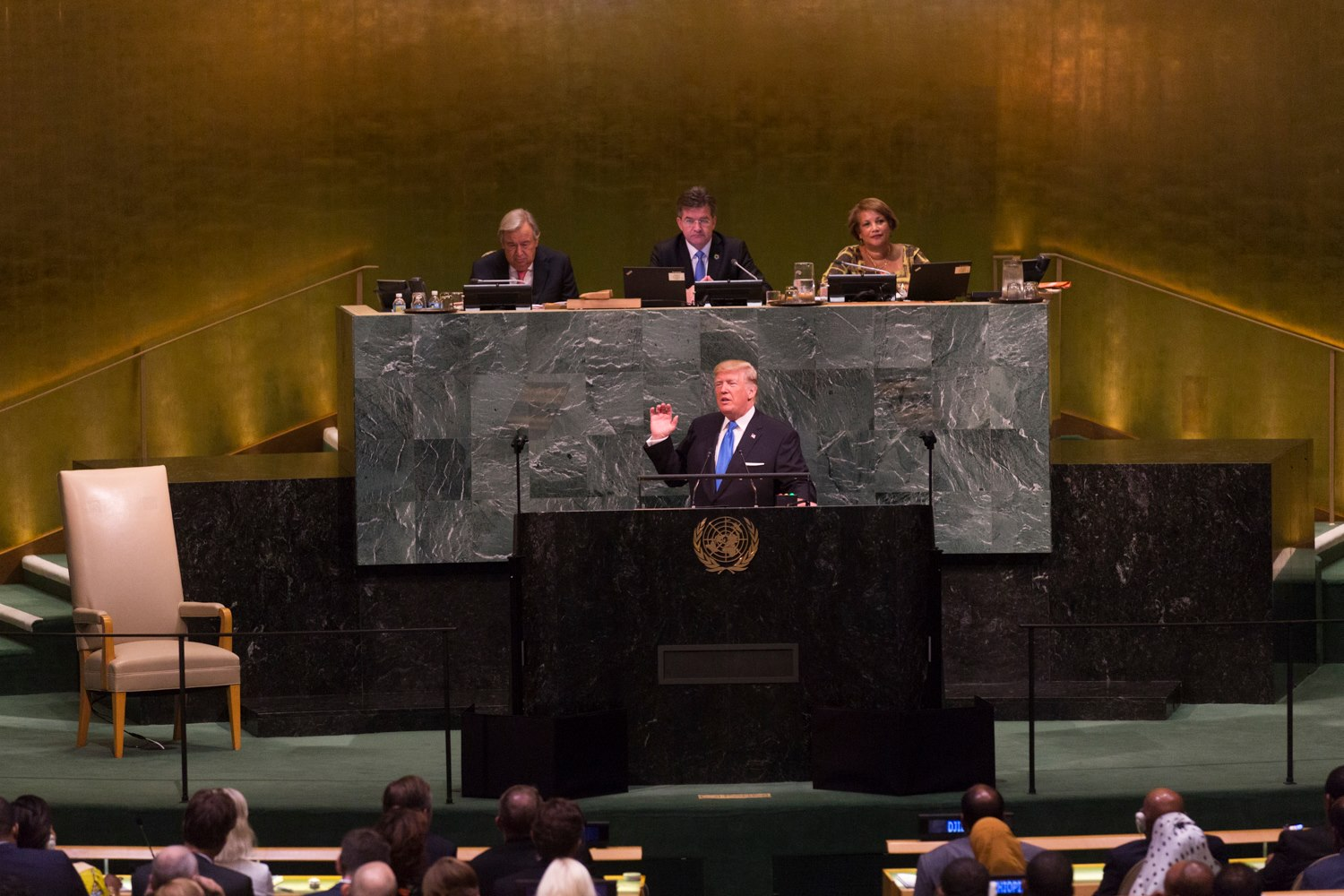
Lajčák is seated on the elevated podium directly behind U.S. President Donald Trump, serving as the President of the 72nd UN General Assembly, October 2017

Lajčák served as President of the 72nd Session of the UN General Assembly from 2017 to 2018 where he advocated for dialogue, strengthening multilateralism and the need to serve all people. He was the first president to publish his financial disclosure summary.

=== OSCE Chairperson-in-Office (2019) ===
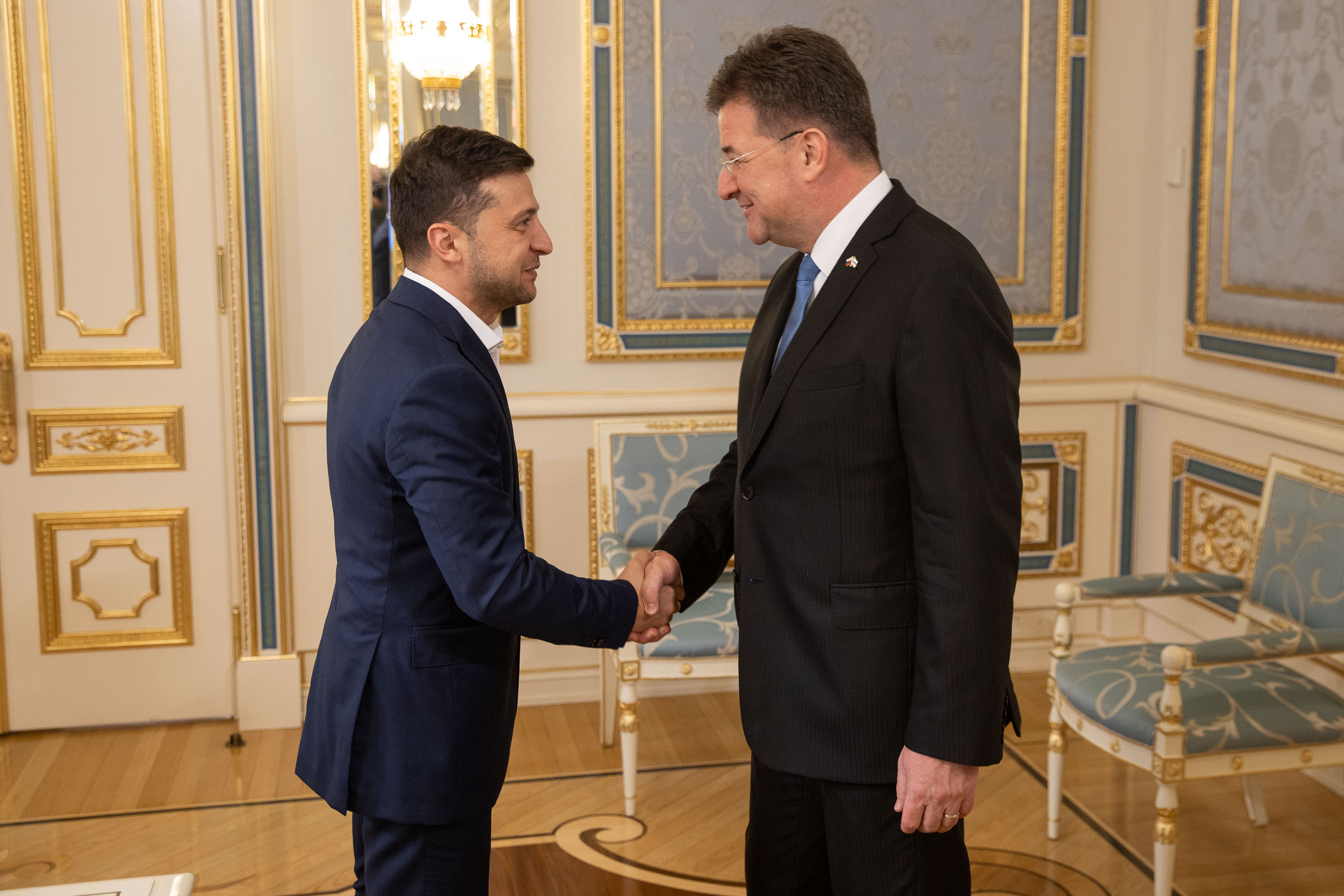
Lajčák, as OSCE Chairperson-in-office and Minister of Foreign Affairs of Slovakia, with Ukrainian President Volodymyr Zelenskyy in Kyiv, June 2019

In 2019, Lajčák was particularly active in East and South-East Europe as Chairperson-in-office of the OSCE. Slovakia's OSCE Chairmanship focused on people, dialogue and stability.

During his tenure, Lajčák visited 15 OSCE field presences to highlight the OSCE's important work on the ground, and held high-level talks with interlocutors in the OSCE region, including Russian Foreign Minister Sergey Lavrov in February, June, and September 2019, as well as US Secretary of State Mike Pompeo in April 2019.

Ahead of the 26th OSCE Ministerial Council, Lajčák shared his Bratislava Appeal, an informal initiative addressed to foreign ministers from across the OSCE area arguing for more support to the OSCE and multilateralism.

=== EU Special Representative (2020–2025) ===
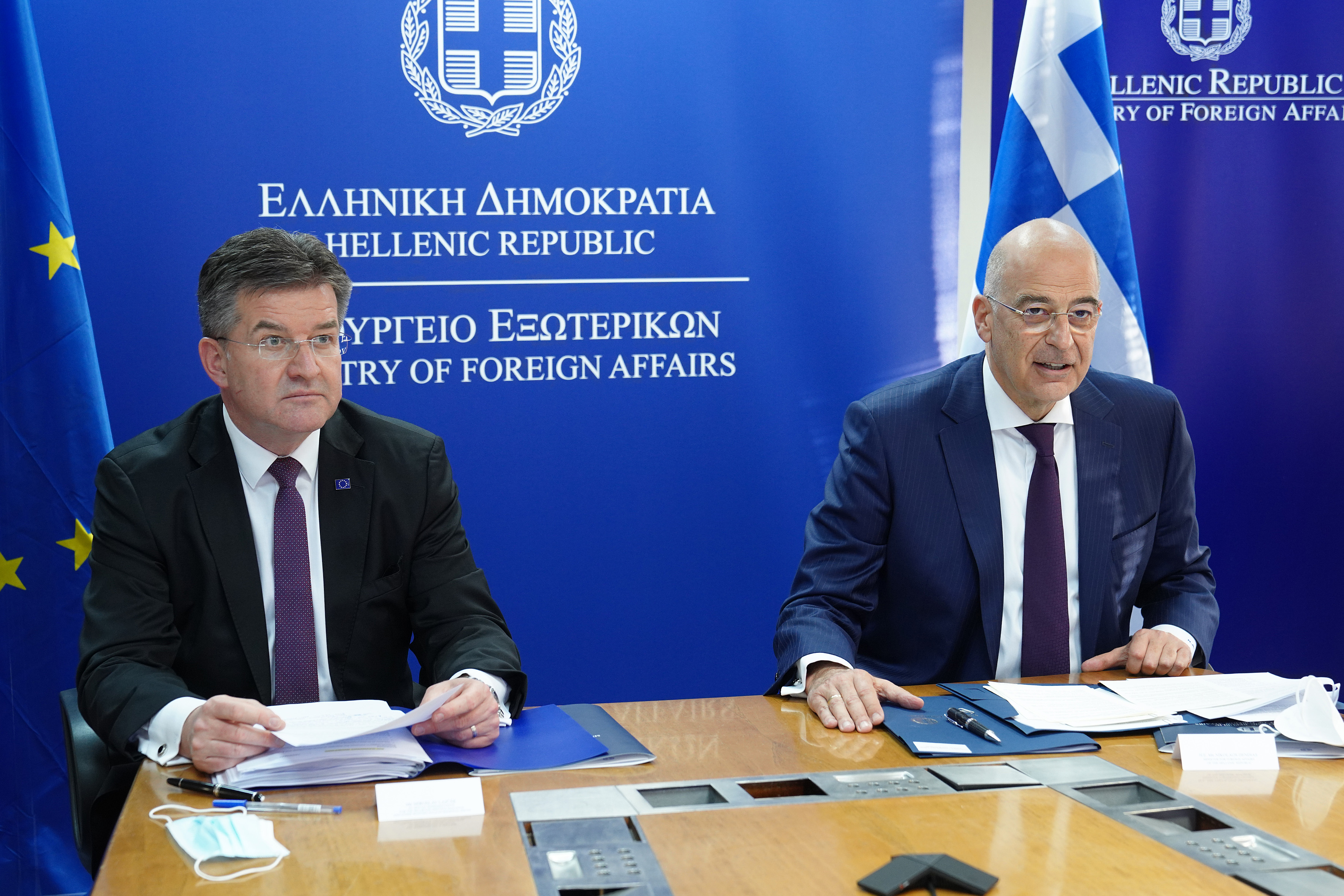
EU Special Representative Lajčák and Greek Minister of Foreign Affairs Nikos Dendias participating in a videoconference on the European perspective of the Western Balkans, Athens, May 2021

On 2 April 2020, Miroslav Lajčák was appointed by the EU Council as the EU Special Representative (EUSR) for the Belgrade-Pristina Dialogue and other Western Balkan regional issues. His mandate included the tasks of achieving a comprehensive normalization of relations between Serbia and Kosovo, improving good neighborly relations, and contributing to the consistency of EU action in the region. His term was extended several times to provide continuity during critical negotiations.

In April 2024, German Member of the European Parliament Reinhard Bütikofer publicly criticized Lajčák, describing his performance in the role as a "disaster". These remarks followed reports that Lajčák would be transitioning from his mediation post to serve as the EU Ambassador to Switzerland and the Principality of Liechtenstein starting in September 2024. Bütikofer expressed hope that Lajčák's new appointment would not negatively impact diplomatic relations between the EU and Switzerland as his previous tenure had in the Balkans. Throughout his mandate, Lajčák faced various criticisms from Kosovo officials and political analysts who questioned his impartiality in the regional dialogue process. His transition to the role of EU Ambassador to Switzerland and the Principality of Liechtenstein was ultimately cancelled due to "unforeseen developments". Consequently, the EU Council formally extended his mandate a final time until 31 January 2025.

Following the completion of his service, Lajčák was succeeded on 1 February 2025 by Danish diplomat Peter Sørensen.

=== Advisor for foreign affairs and national security (2025–2026) ===
After five years as the EU's chief negotiator in the Balkans, Lajčák returned to Slovak diplomacy, where he was appointed as an Advisor to Slovak Prime Minister Robert Fico, focusing on security issues and the Western Balkans.

== Epstein files ==
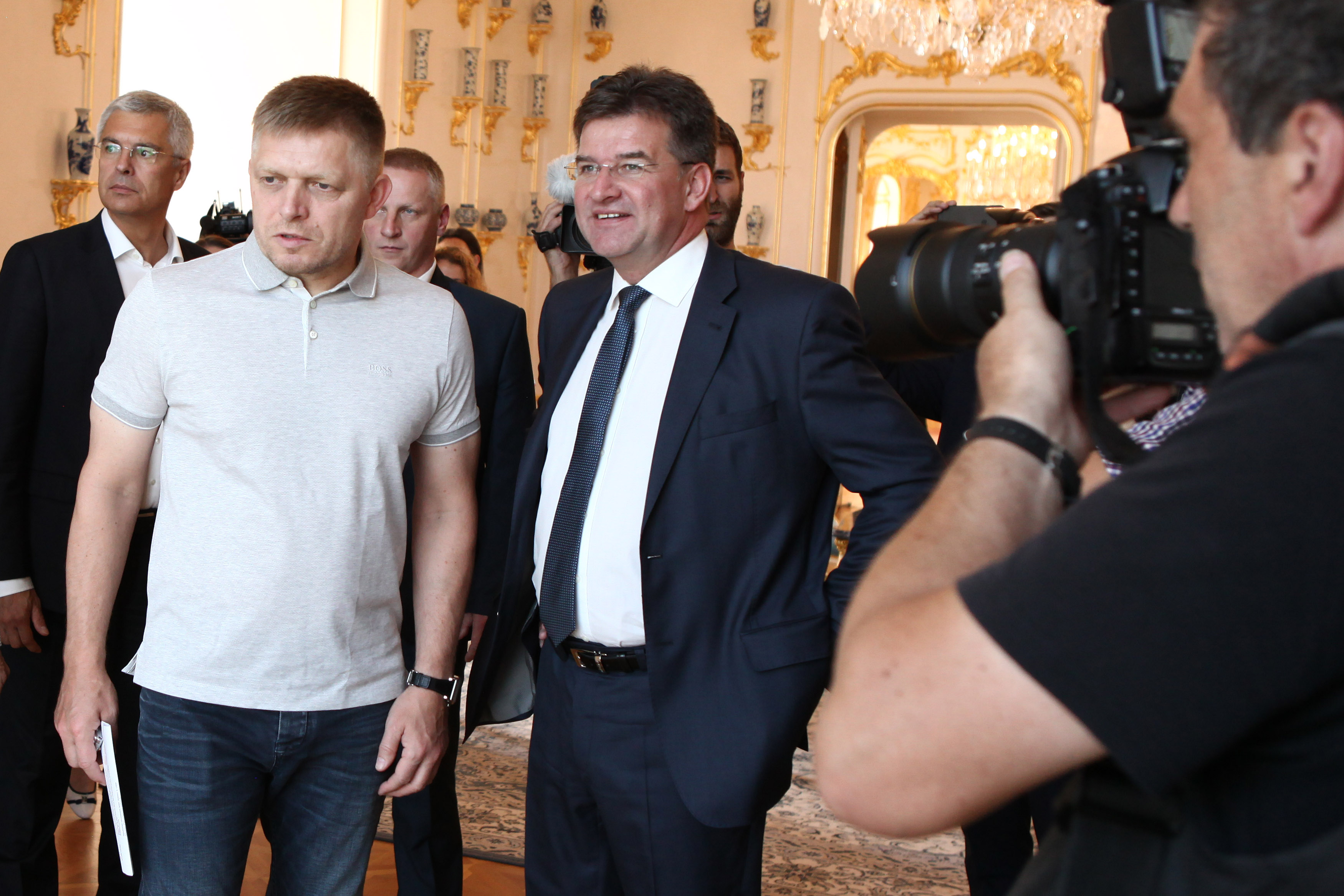
Miroslav Lajčák and Slovak Prime Minister Robert Fico at the Bratislava Summit during Slovakia's EU presidency, September 2016

In late 2025 and early 2026, the release of over three million pages of documents related to convicted child sex offender Jeffrey Epstein, known as the "Epstein files" by the U.S. Department of Justice, sparked a significant political controversy in Slovakia. The documents revealed, that Lajčák had extensive email communication with Epstein between 2017 and 2019. During the period of correspondence, Lajčák simultaneously served as Minister of Foreign and European Affairs of Slovakia in Fico's Third Cabinet and President of the United Nations General Assembly.

=== November 2025 ===
In November 2025, it was disclosed that the correspondence featured a familiar tone, with Epstein referring to Lajčák as "Miro" and discussing his potential advancement to top roles in the UN or NATO. Notably, in a March 15, 2018, email to Steve Bannon, Epstein explicitly identified Lajčák as the person who would lead a "European project".

While Lajčák admitted to social contact, he maintains the interactions were purely professional and routine for his diplomatic duties.

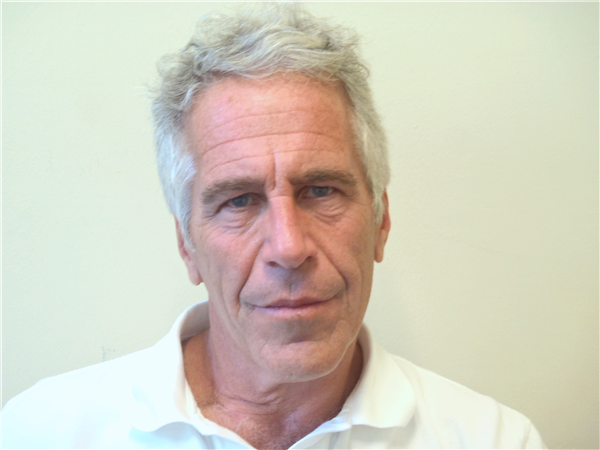
Jeffrey Epstein in 2013

Despite intense pressure from the opposition and coalition partner Slovak National Party to dismiss Lajčák, Slovak Prime Minister Robert Fico has staunchly defended him. Fico characterized Lajčák as an "excellent diplomat" and stated he would not "execute" a colleague based on social meetings without evidence of moral or legal failure.

=== December 2025 ===
A photograph released in December 2025 confirmed their personal connection, showing Lajčák and Epstein together at the Slovak diplomatic residence in Vienna.

The meeting took place in March 2019. While planning the gathering in Vienna, Lajčák was told that Epstein would be arriving with three female assistants and arranged for a minivan to pick them up. Epstein attempted to dismiss any potential concerns about their age by assuring Lajčák, "Don't worry, they all look at least 20".

=== January 2026 ===
In January 2026, files released by the U.S. Department of Justice showed the correspondence between Lajčák and Epstein was frequent and covered a range of topics. In addition to global politics and international affairs, their exchanges included personal subjects, specifically mentions of women and girls, often framed in an informal or suggestive manner. Lajčák's name appears more than 300 times throughout the documentation.

The records allegedly show Lajčák asking Jeffrey Epstein to introduce him to "young girls" and boasting that Epstein had not yet seen him "in action". Epstein responded by offering him "young girls and their sisters" and Lajčák explicitly requested invitations to participate in Epstein's private "games".

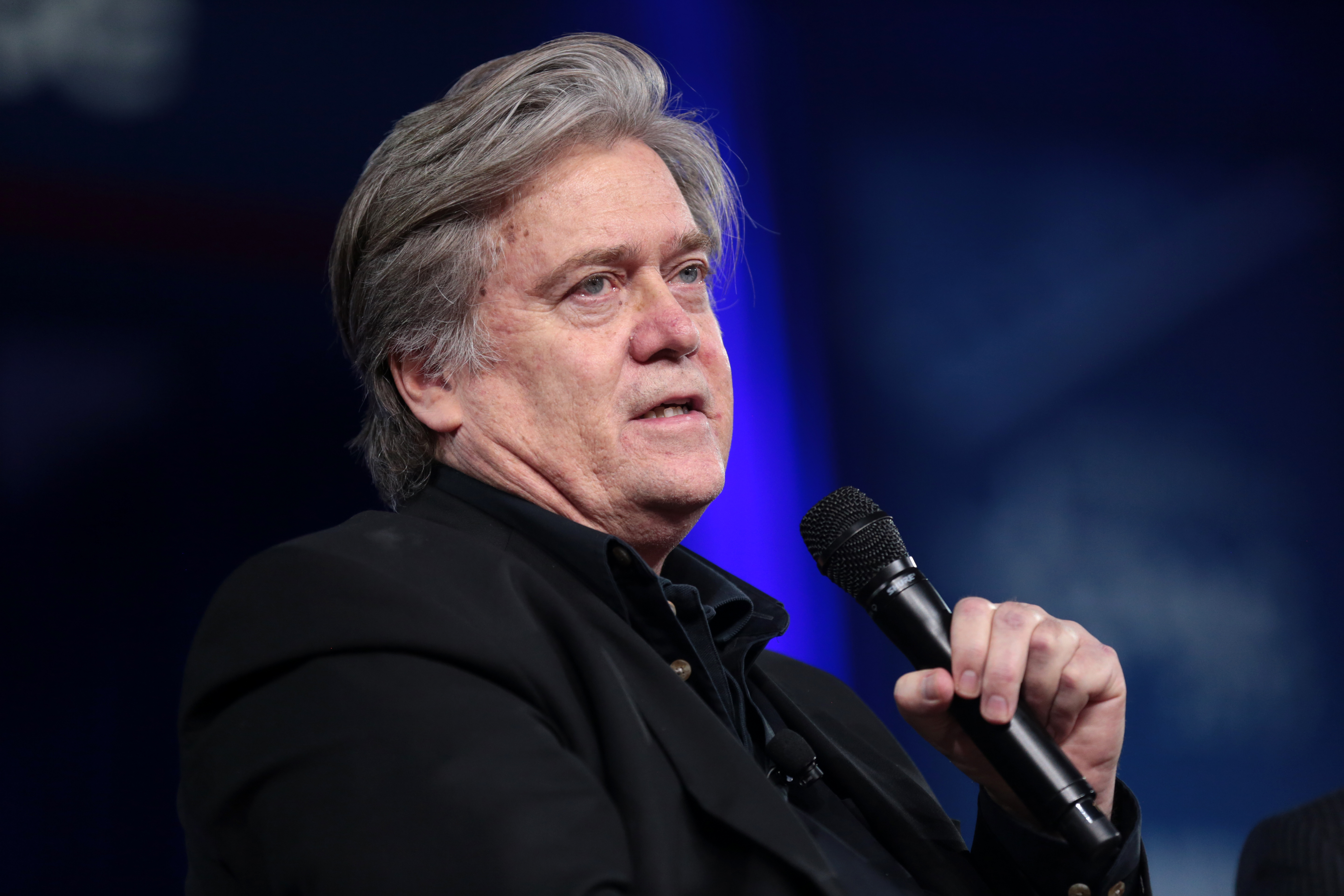
Steve Bannon appears frequently in chat logs between Lajčák and Epstein

The released documents also state that Miroslav Lajčák offered to present Robert Fico as a suitable political figure for the agendas of the American far-right and strategist Steve Bannon. According to the publicized records, Lajčák actively promoted Fico as a figure who could be utilized to further specific political interests within the Western radical right network. The files contain transcripts where Lajčák explicitly characterizes Fico as the "right figure" for the strategic goals discussed with Jeffrey Epstein and his associates. Epstein wanted to establish a network of far-right political groups with Bannon in Europe and Lajčák said Fico could "play Steve's game".

On 31 January, following a joint statement from opposition politicians calling for his departure and mounting pressure from the media, Lajčák submitted his resignation, which Robert Fico agreed to and accepted, marking the end of Lajčák's tenure as a key advisor. Commenting on the decision, Fico stated: "Miro has once again proven himself to be a great diplomat and I accept his offer to end our cooperation, although we are all, not just myself, losing an incredible source of experience in diplomacy and foreign policy".

=== February 2026 ===
On 2 February 2026, Lajčák explained that his interactions with Epstein were strictly professional and social, characterizing them as a necessary part of his diplomatic duties in New York, where Jeffrey Epstein was a well-connected figure who "opened many doors". He stated that in 2017, he was a "boy from Slovakia" navigating high-level international circles and was entirely unaware of Epstein's criminal activities at the time. Lajčák claimed he cannot recall any messages or conversations with Epstein about girls.

Lajčák acknowledged that the communication was a "mistake" and "unacceptable" stating: "When I read those messages today, I feel like a fool. It was a private conversation. At the very least, I made a poor judgment. I am paying the price for it".

On February 3, Robert Fico said that he had never met Steve Bannon.

On February 4, a second photo surfaced, showing Lajčák and Epstein together in the center of Bratislava standing by the Čumil statue. Metadata and surrounding records suggested the photo was taken around November 7, 2018.

Further analysis of documents and flight logs confirmed that Lajčák had also been a passenger on Epstein's private aircraft, the "Lolita Express". Flight logs indicate that Lajčák traveled on the aircraft at least twice between 2017 and 2018.

== Other activities ==
In addition to his formal diplomatic and governmental roles, Miroslav Lajčák holds several positions within international policy organizations, the private sector, and academic institutions. These positions involve work in several fields, such as European foreign policy, regional security, human rights, and corporate oversight.

His current activities include:

- Slovnaft, Supervisory Board Member

His past activities include:

- European Council on Foreign Relations (ECFR), Member
- European Alpbach Forum (EFA), Member of the International Advisory Board
- Friends of Europe, Member of the Board of Trustees
- The Geneva Centre for Human Rights Advancement and Global Dialogue (GCHRAGD), Board Member
- GLOBSEC, Member of the International Advisory Council
- Matej Bel University, Member of the Scientific Council

== Personal life ==
Miroslav Lajčák is married to the prominent Slovak television presenter Jarmila Lajčáková-Hargašová (b. 1966), whom he wed in January 2002. Together, they have one daughter named Lara (b. 2002). Before his current marriage, Lajčák was previously married, from this first marriage, he has a daughter named Nikola. His wife, Jarmila, also has a daughter named Vanesa (b. 1992) from her own previous relationship.

While the identity of his first wife is not widely publicized in official diplomatic biographies, she accompanied him during his early career postings, including his time as the Slovak Ambassador to Japan between 1994 and 1998.

Apart from his native Slovak, Lajčák is fluent in English, German, Russian, Czech and Serbo-Croatian.

== Awards and honors ==
=== State Honors ===
- Serbia and Montenegro:
  - Order of the Yugoslav Star, 1st Class (2005)
- Moldova:
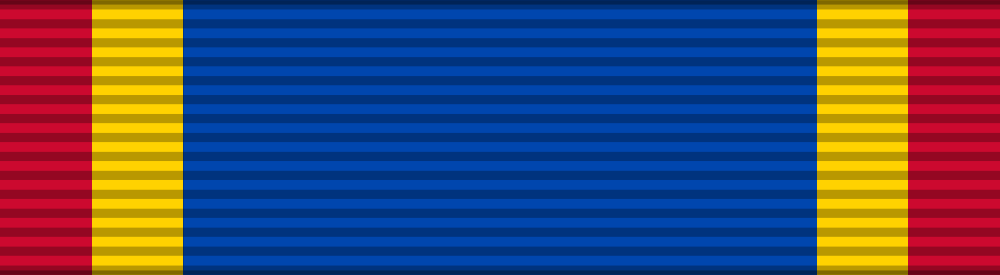
  - Order of Honour (2014)
- Montenegro:
  - Order of the Montenegrin Grand Star (2016)
- Sweden:
  - Order of the Polar Star (2020)
- Romania:
  - Order of the Star of Romania, 3rd Class, Grand Officer (2020)
- Japan:
  - Order of the Rising Sun, 1st Class, Grand Cordon (2022)

=== Honorary Doctorates ===
- Bulgaria:
  - University of National and World Economy
- Bosnia and Herzegovina:
  - University of Mostar
- Russia:
  - Moscow State Institute of International Relations
- Romania:
  - National University of Political Studies and Public Administration
- Montenegro:
  - University of Montenegro

== See also ==
- List of people named in the Epstein files

Diplomatic posts
Preceded by Christian Schwarz-Schilling	High Representative for Bosnia and Herzegovina; 2007–2009	Succeeded by Valentin Inzko
Preceded by Peter Thomson	President of the United Nations General Assembly; 2017–2018	Succeeded by María Fernanda Espinosa
Political offices
Preceded by Ján Kubiš	Minister of Foreign Affairs; 2009–2010	Succeeded by Mikuláš Dzurinda
Preceded by Mikuláš Dzurinda	Minister of Foreign Affairs; 2012–2020	Succeeded by Ivan Korčok
