= Seventy-second session of the United Nations General Assembly =

72nd United Nations General Assembly

- 12 September 2017 – 18 September 2018 72nd session 72nd general debate
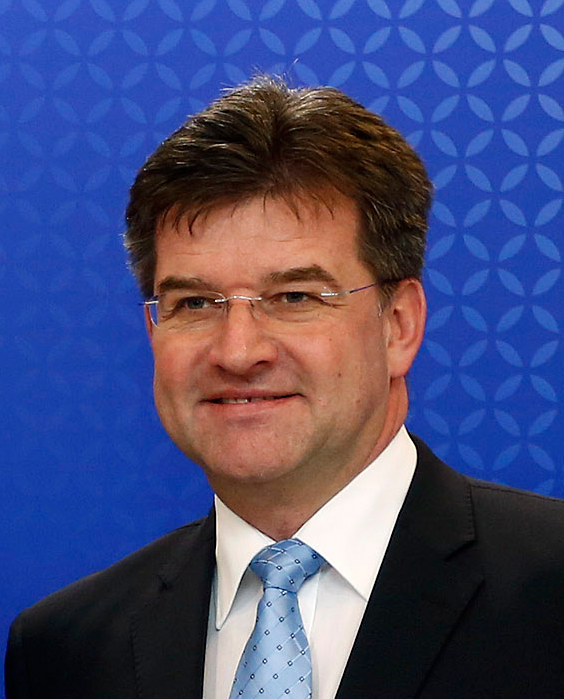
- President of the 72nd General Assembly; Miroslav Lajcak
- Host country: United Nations
- Cities: New York City
- Venues: General Assembly Hall at the United Nations Headquarters
- Participants: Member States of the United Nations
- Secretary-General: António Guterres
- Website: www.un.org/en/ga/

The seventy-second session of the United Nations General Assembly opened on 12 September 2017. The president of the United Nations General Assembly was from the Eastern European Group.

== Organisation for the session ==
=== President ===
Slovak Foreign Minister Miroslav Lajcak was elected as President of the General Assembly on 31 May 2017.

=== Vice-presidents ===
There were twenty-one Vice-Presidents for the 72nd Session. They were:

The five permanent members of the Security Council:

- China
- France
- Russian Federation
- United Kingdom of Great Britain and Northern Ireland
- United States of America

As well as the following nations:

- Afghanistan
- Bolivia (Plurinational State of)
- Chile
- Finland
- Gabon
- Ghana
- Guatemala
- Indonesia
- Israel
- Liberia
- Madagascar
- Morocco
- Sri Lanka
- United Arab Emirates
- Vanuatu
- Zimbabwe

=== Committee bureaus ===
The following were elected as Chairs and officers of the General Assembly committees for the 73rd Session:

First Committee (Disarmament and International Security)

Name	Country	Position
H.E. Mr. Mohammad Hussein Ali Bahr Aluloom	Iraq	Chairperson
Mr. Georg Sparber	Liechtenstein	Vice-Chair
Ms. Terje Raadik	Estonia	Vice-Chair
Mr. Alfredo Toro Carnevalli	Bolivia (Plurinational State of)	Vice-Chair
Ms. Martin Ngundze	South Africa	Rapporteur

Second Committee (Economic and Financial)

Name	Country	Position
H.E. Mr. Sven Jürgenson	Estonia	Chairperson
Mr. Menelaos Menelaou	Cyprus	Vice-Chair
Ms. Kimberly Louis	Saint Lucia	Vice-Chair
Ms. Cristiana Mele	Italy	Vice-Chair
Ms. Theresah Chipulu Luswili Chanda	Zambia	Rapporteur

Third Committee (Social, Humanitarian and Cultural)

Name	Country	Position
H.E. Mr. Einar Gunnarsson	Iceland	Chairperson
Mr. Nebil Idris	Eritrea	Vice-Chair
Ms. Alanoud Qassim M. A. Al-Temimi	Qatar	Vice-Chair
Ms. Dóra Kaszás	Hungary	Vice-Chair
Mr. Edgar Andrés Molina Linares	Guatemala	Rapporteur

Fourth Committee (Special Political and Decolonization)

Name	Country	Position
H.E. Mr. Rafael Darió Ramírez Carreño	Venezuela (Bolivarian Republic of)	Chairperson
Mr. Yasser Halfouni	Morocco	Vice-Chair
Ms. Ceren Hande Őzgür	Turkey	Vice-Chair
Mr. Ahmed Abdelrahman Ahmed Almahmoud	United Arab Emirates	Vice-Chair
Mr. Angel Angelov	Bulgaria	Rapporteur

Fifth Committee (Administrative and Budgetary)

Name	Country	Position
H.E. Mr. Tommo Monthe	Cameroon	Chairperson
Mr. Abbas Yazdani (Sep 2017 - 22 Mar 2018)	Iran (Islamic Republic of)	Vice-Chair
Mr. Haseeb Zohar (7 May 2018 - 18 September 2018)	Pakistan	Vice-Chair
Ms. Julie O'Brien	Ireland	Vice-Chair
Ms. Anda Grinberga	Latvia	Vice-Chair
Mr. Felipe Garcia Landa	Mexico	Rapporteur

Sixth Committee (Legal)

Name	Country	Position
H.E. Mr. Burhan Gafoor	Singapore	Chairperson
Mr. Duncan Laki Muhumuza	Uganda	Vice-Chair
Mr. Angel Horna	Peru	Vice-Chair
Ms. Carrie McDougall	Australia	Vice-Chair
Mr. Peter Nagy	Slovakia	Rapporteur

=== Seat allocation ===
As is tradition before each session of the General Assembly, Secretary-General António Guterres drew lots to see which Member State would occupy the first seat in the General Assembly Hall for the session, with the other Member States following according to the English translation of their name. The same order is followed in the six main committees. For this session the Czech Republic was chosen to take the first seat of the General Assembly Chamber.

=== General debate ===
Most states had a representative speak about issues concerning their country and the hopes for the coming year regarding the actions of the General Assembly. The general debate serves as an opportunity for Member States to declare which international issues are most pressing to them. The General Debate occurred from 19–25 September 2017, with the exception of the intervening Sunday.

The theme for the session's debate was chosen by President Miroslav Lajcak as "Focusing on People: Striving for Peace and a Decent Life for All on a Sustainable Planet."

The speaking order for the general debate was as follows:

- The President of the General Assembly: Called the meeting to order
- The Secretary-General: Introduced the “Report of the Secretary-General on the work of the Organization”
- The President of the General Assembly: Opened the general debate and made a speech
- Brazil, as per tradition, was the first Member State to speak in the general debate
- The United States of America, as the host country, was the second Member State to speak
- All other full Member States (speaking order is based on the level of representation, preference and other criteria such as geographic balance)
- Only the Holy See, the State of Palestine and the European Union are invited to participate in the general debate (speaking slots are determined by the level of representation)

A voluntary 15-minute time limit for statements is to be observed in the general debate. According to the rules in place for the General Debate, the statements should be in one of the United Nations official languages of Arabic, Chinese, English, French, Russian or Spanish, and will be translated by the United Nations translators.

== Resolutions ==
Resolutions came before the UNGA between October 2017 and summer 2018.

The tenth emergency special session of the United Nations General Assembly was held in continuation during the tenure of this session on 21 December 2017 in regards to the status of Jerusalem. United Nations General Assembly Resolution ES-10/L.22 passed by 128 votes to nine against with 21 absentees and 35 abstentions.

== Elections ==
The election of non-permanent members to the Security Council for 2019–2020 was held on 8 June 2018, in which South Africa, Indonesia, Dominican Republic, Germany and Belgium were elected.

An election to choose 18 members of the United Nations Human Rights Council for a three-year term took place.

== See also ==
- List of UN General Assembly sessions
- List of General debates of the United Nations General Assembly
