= Čumil (statue) =

Statue located in Bratislava, Slovakia

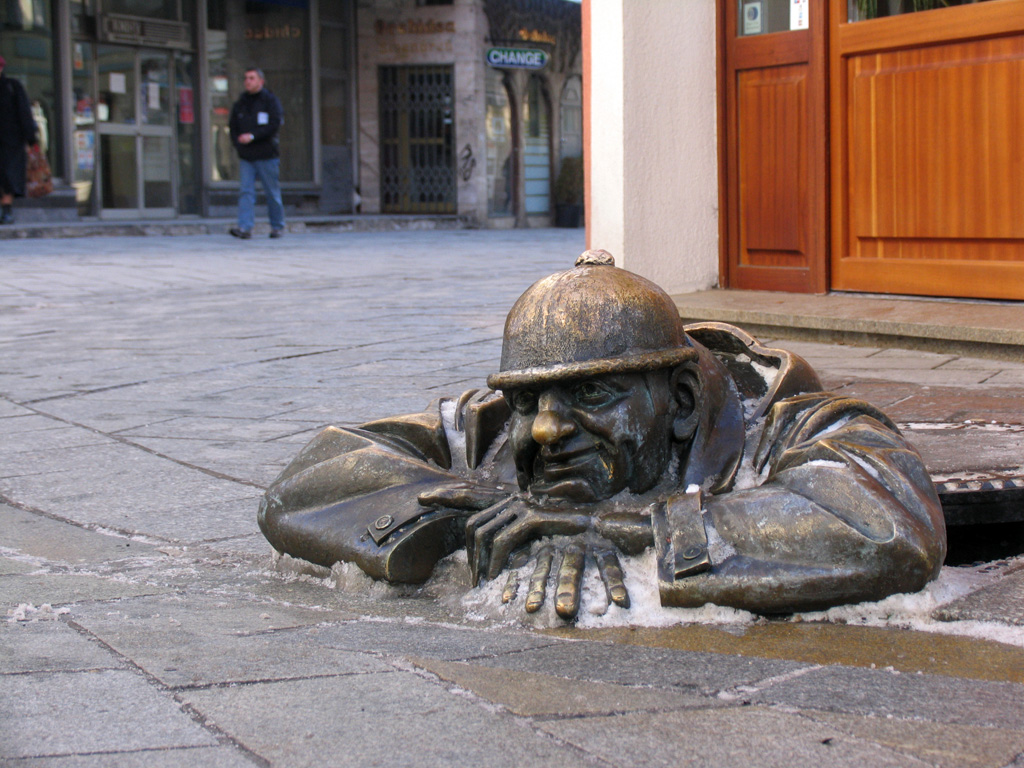
- The statue

- Location in Slovakia
- Interactive map of Čumil
- Location: Bratislava, Slovakia
- Coordinates: 48.142842°N 17.108867°E
- Designer: Viktor Hulík
- Opening date: 26 July 1997 (age 28)

The Čumil statue, also known as Čumil the sewage worker, Man at work or simply Čumil, is a statue located in the city centre of Bratislava, the capital city of Slovakia. Čumil is considered one of the most prominent statues in Bratislava and is considered as one of the main attractions in the city center.

Čumil is a bronze statue created by sculptor, academic painter, graphic artist and artist Viktor Hulík.

In various media abroad, Čumil is mistakenly identified as a soldier. Similar statues have also been installed in other cities in Russia.

== History ==
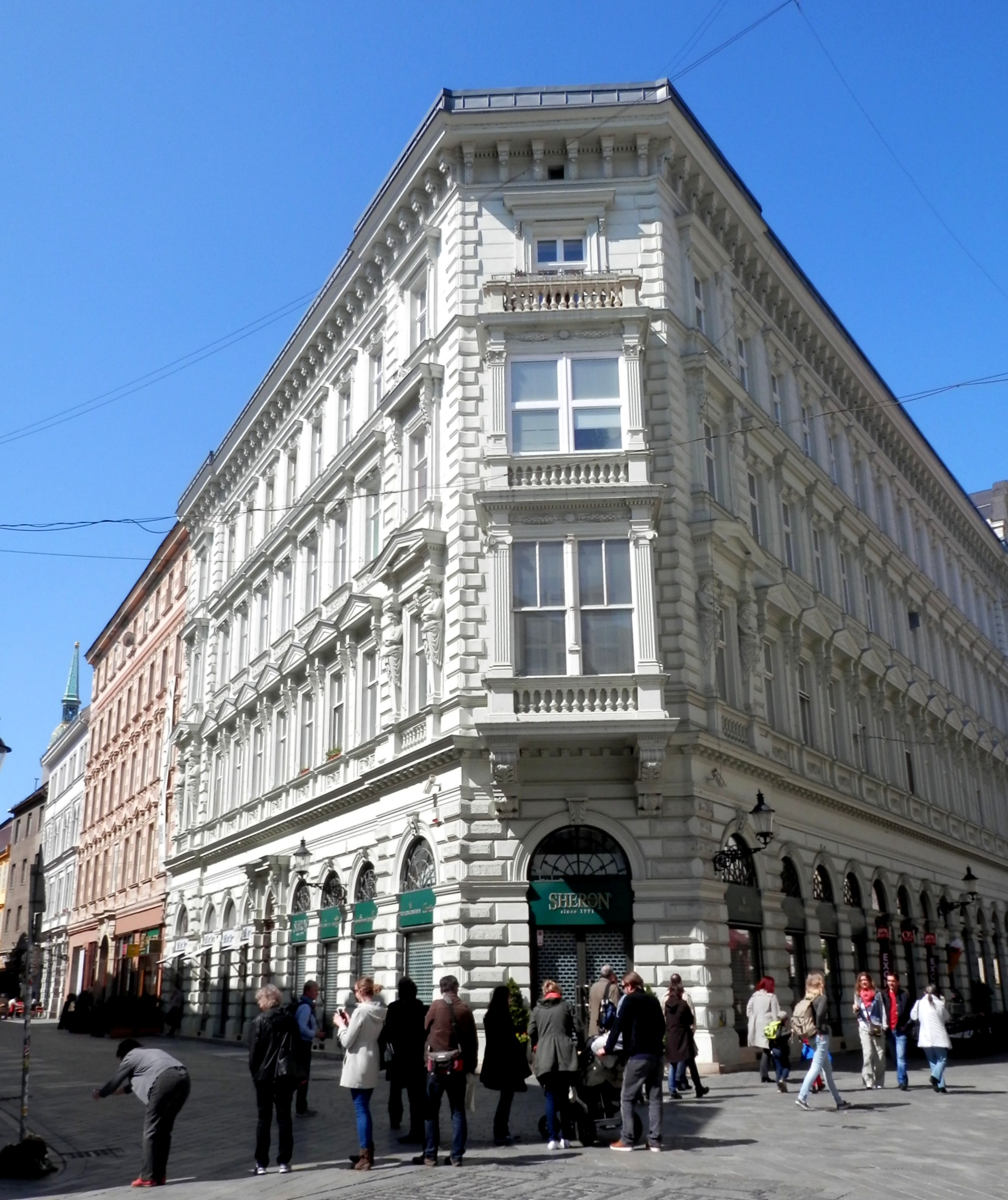
Čumil located at the corner of Panská Street, Bratislava.

The Čumil statue was installed on 26 July 1997 at an event called the Korzo party, to celebrate the reconstructed and renewed pedestrian zone. Thirty thousand people attended the Korzo party, along with the President of Slovakia Michal Kováč. The event also included the installation of two other statues of the Schöne Náci and the Napoleonic soldier.

During a regular inspection in 2018, the Bratislava city police discovered that the statue of Čumil had been tampered with by vandals. To prevent damage, the statue was temporarily dismantled and regular maintenance of its anchoring was also carried out. It was also stated that vandals had also tried to steal the statue.

== Similar statues ==
In 2008, monuments very similar in form to the Čumil statue in Bratislava were erected in Bobruisk and Gomel in Belarus. Due to similar details, they are considered arbitrary copies of the Slovak monument. Similar statues also exist in Serbia and Russia.

== See also ==
- List of statues

== Gallery ==
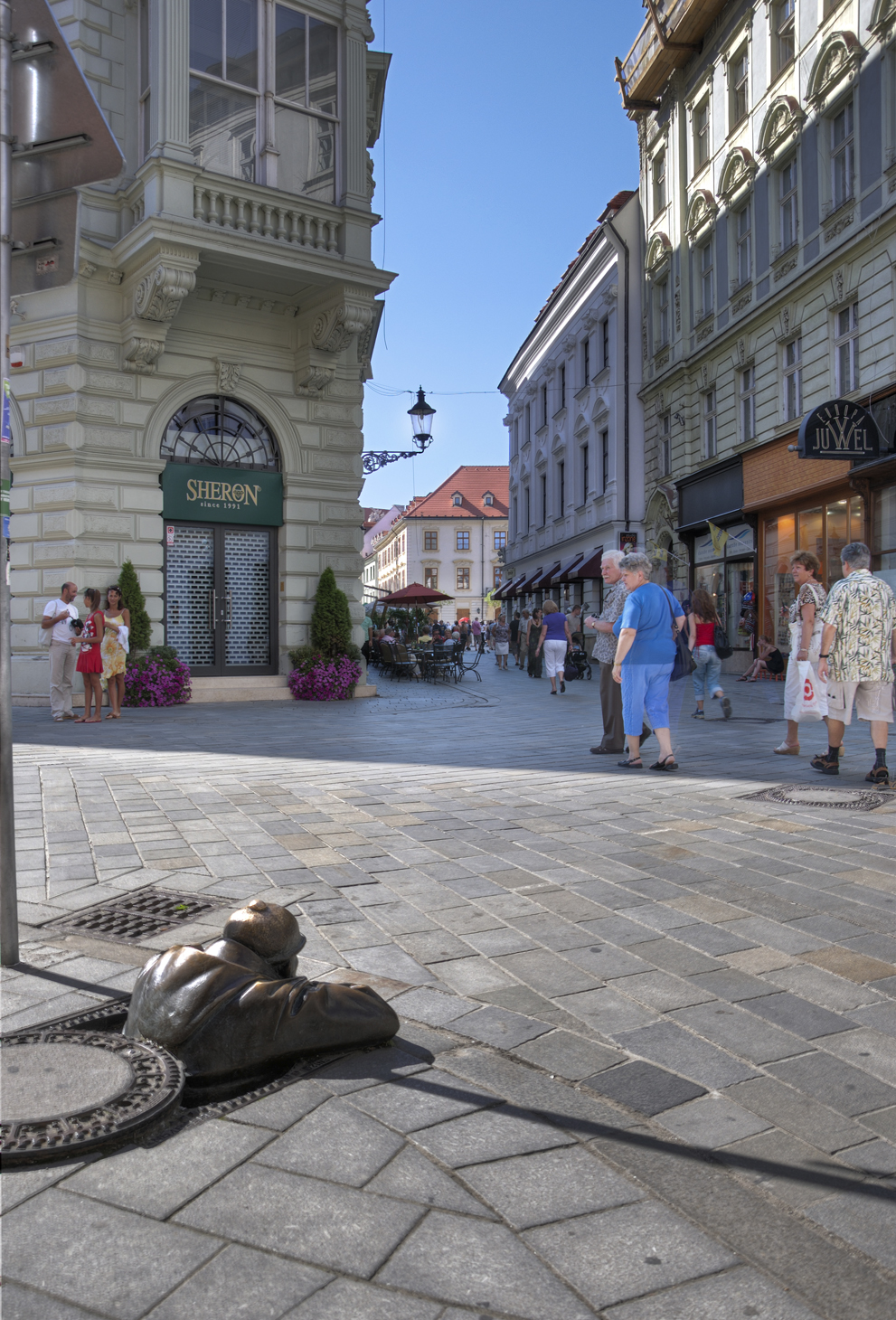

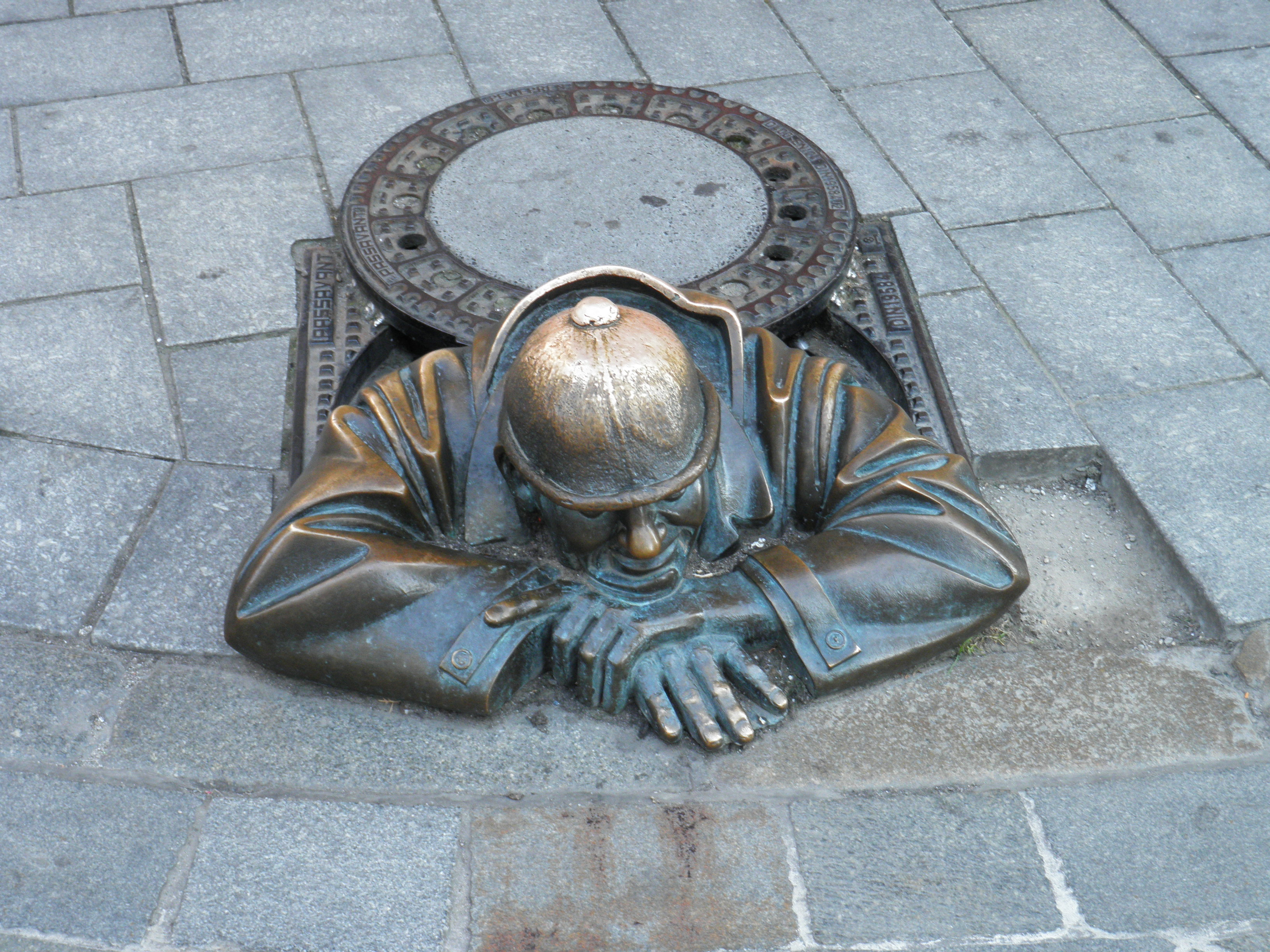

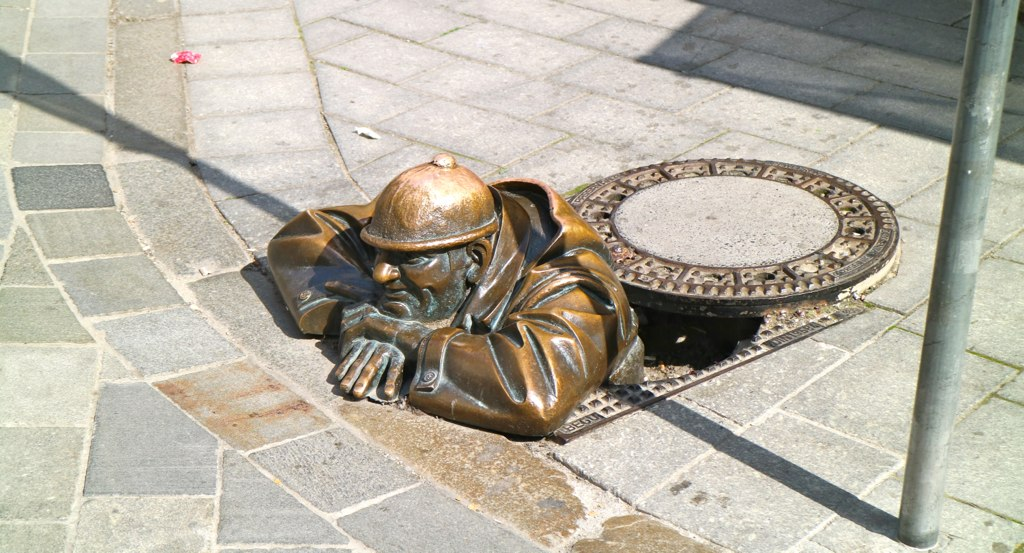

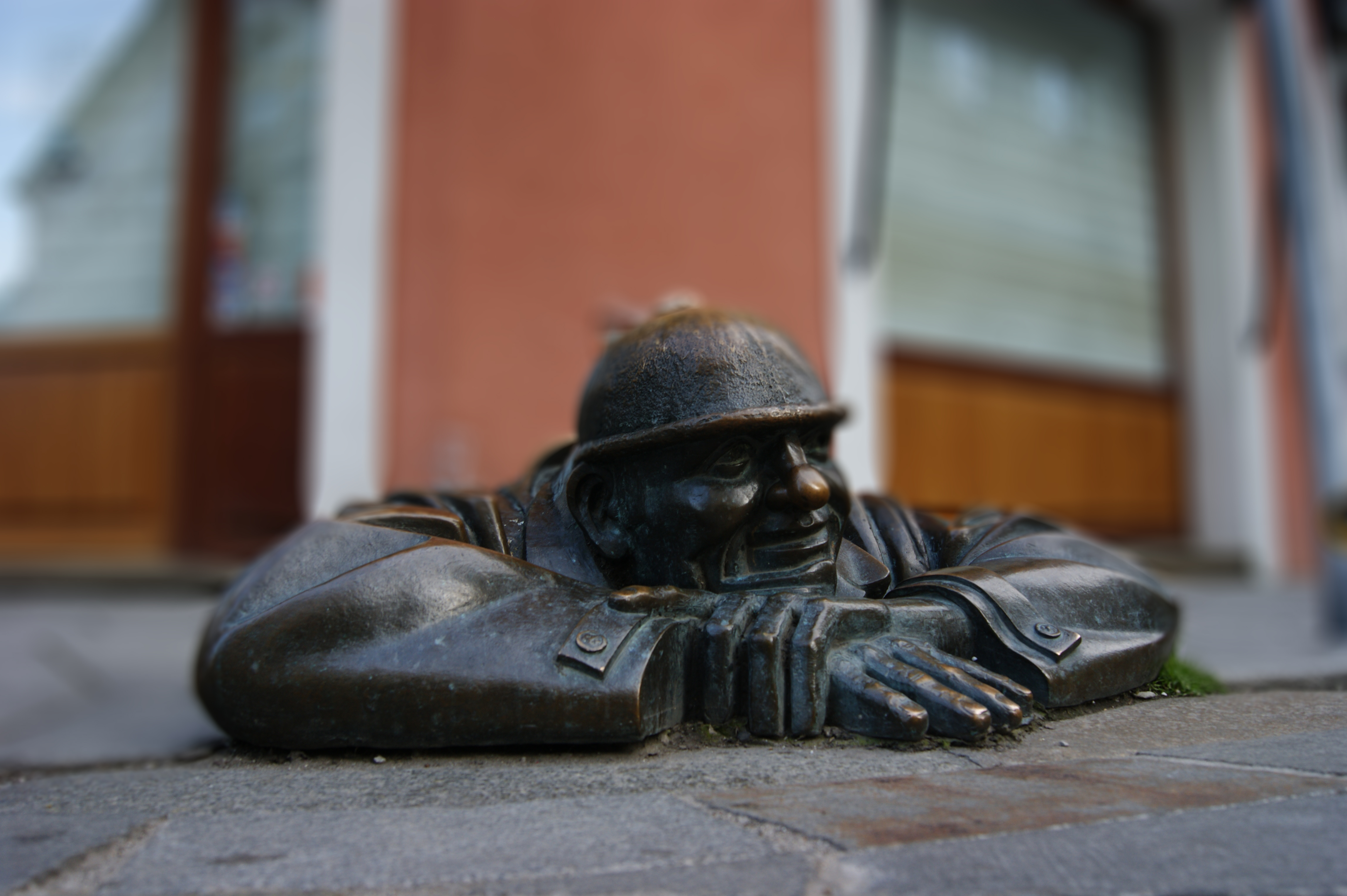

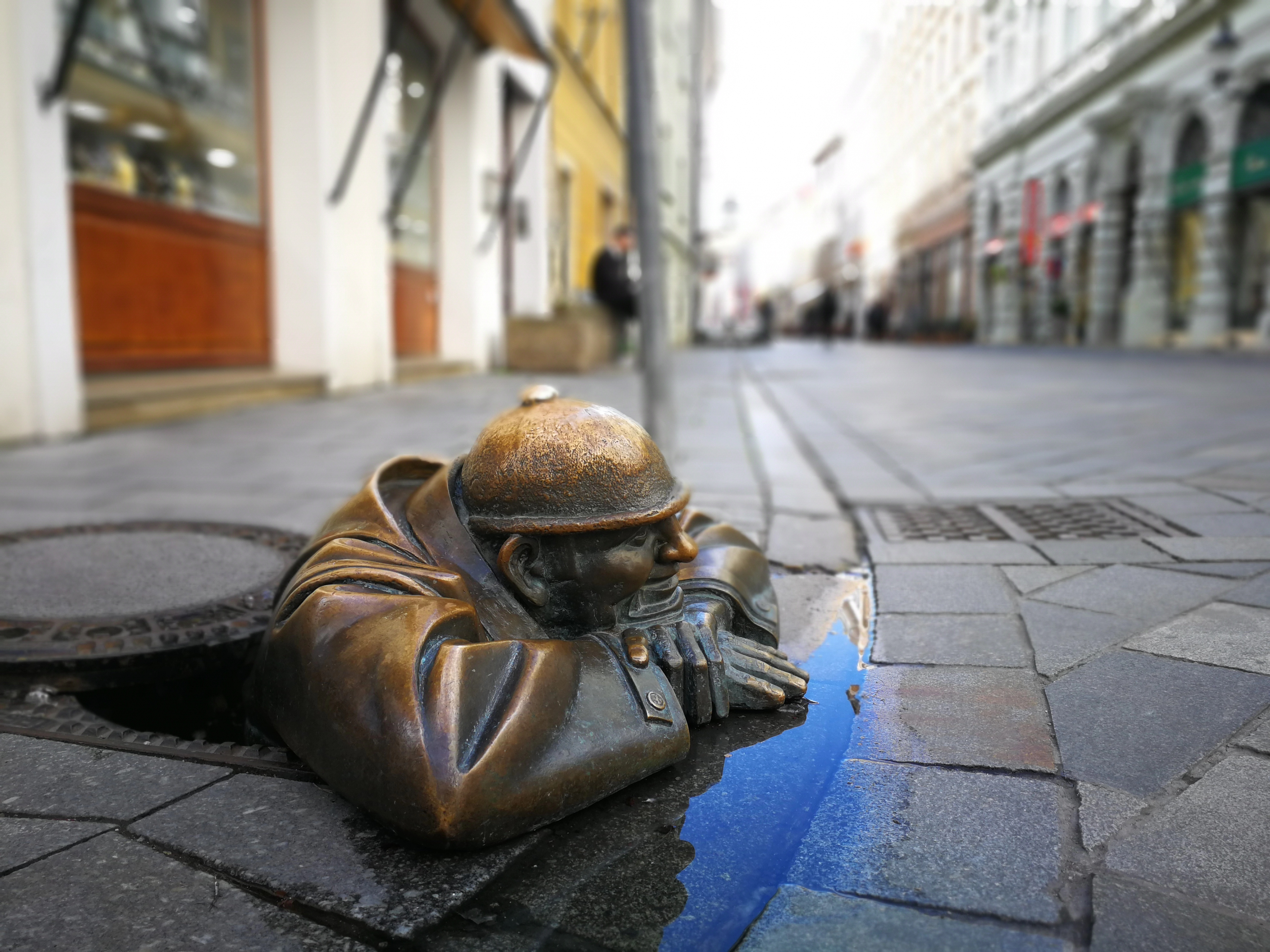

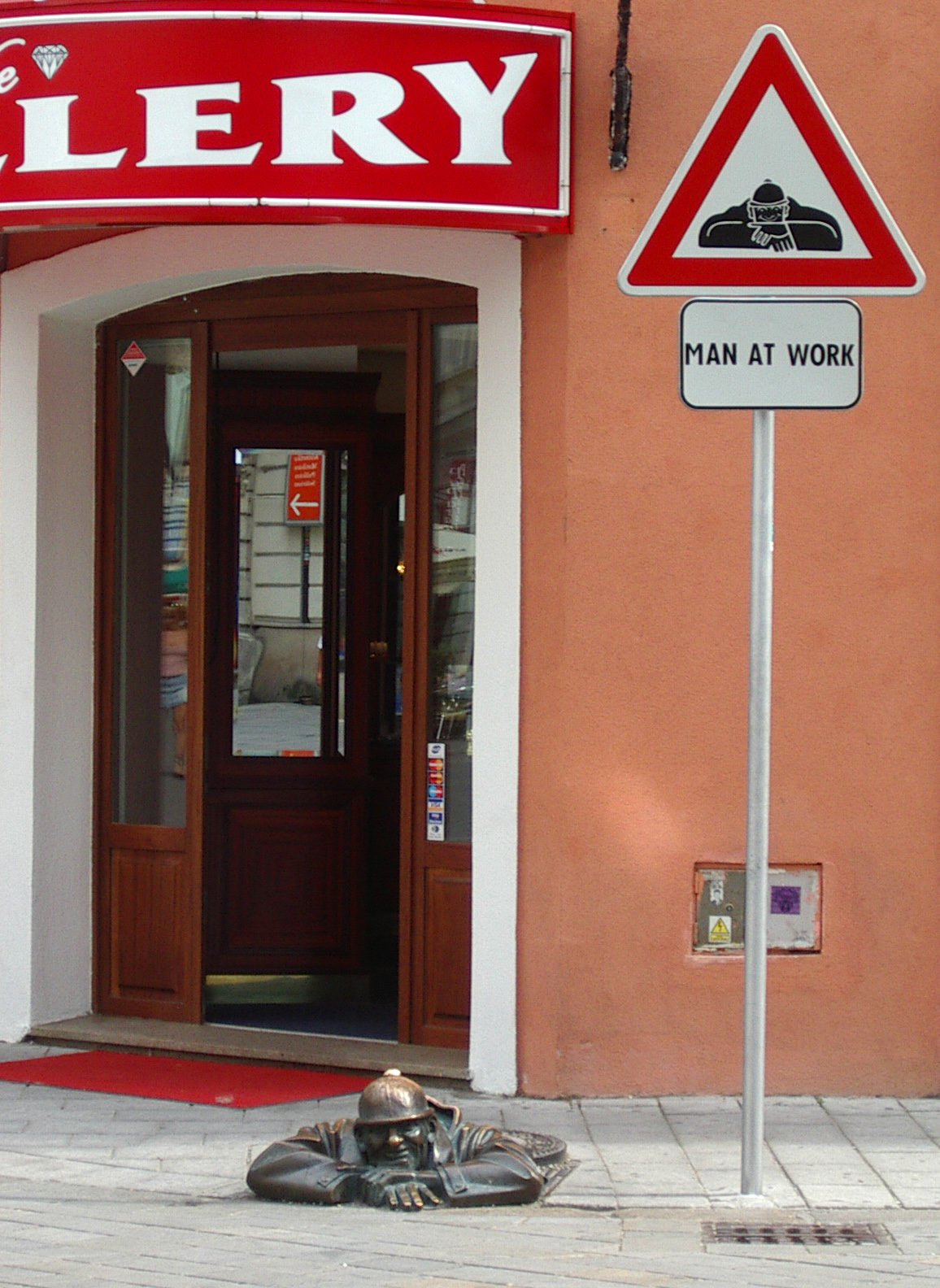
