= Kulbhushan =

Kulbhushan is a masculine Indian given name. Notable people with the name include:

- Kulbhushan Jadhav (born 1970), Indian national convicted of terrorism and spying in Pakistan
- Kulbhushan Kharbanda (born 1944), Indian film actor
