= Cyberwarfare by Russia =

Various types of cyberwarfare used by Russia against many nations

Cyberwarfare by Russia includes denial of service attacks, hacker attacks, dissemination of disinformation and propaganda, participation of state-sponsored teams in political blogs, internet surveillance using SORM technology, persecution of cyber-dissidents and other active measures. According to investigative journalist Andrei Soldatov, some of these activities were coordinated by the Russian signals intelligence, which was part of the FSB and formerly a part of the 16th KGB department. An analysis by the Defense Intelligence Agency in 2017 outlines Russia's view of "Information Countermeasures" or IPb (informatsionnoye protivoborstvo) as "strategically decisive and critically important to control its domestic populace and influence adversary states", dividing 'Information Countermeasures' into two categories of "Informational-Technical" and "Informational-Psychological" groups. The former encompasses network operations relating to defense, attack, and exploitation and the latter to "attempts to change people's behavior or beliefs in favor of Russian governmental objectives."

== Background ==
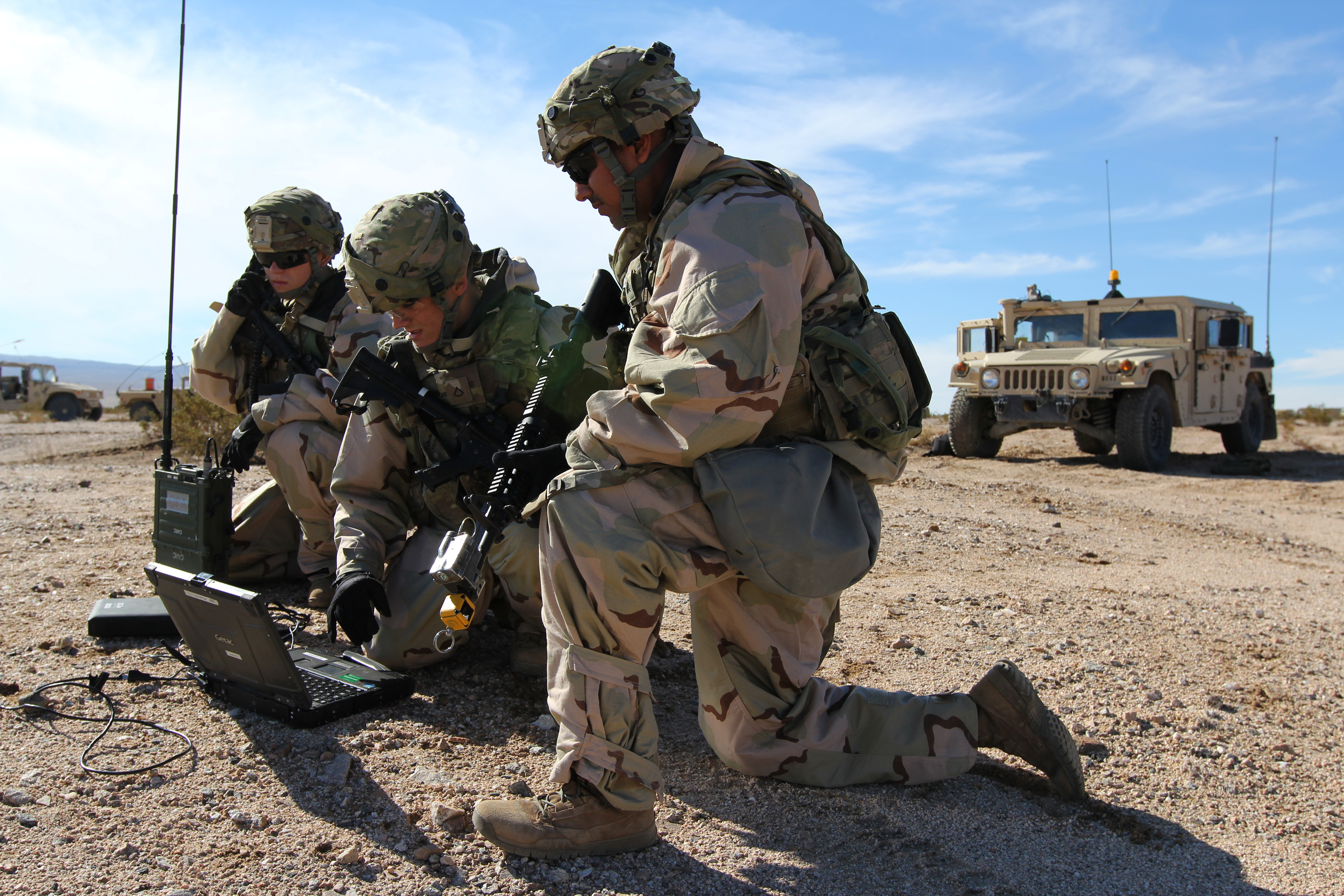
Cyberwarfare specialists of the United States Army's 782nd Military Intelligence Battalion (Cyber) supporting the 3rd Brigade Combat Team, 1st Cavalry Division during a training exercise in 2019

Cyberwarfare is the use of cyberattacks against an enemy state, causing comparable harm to traditional warfare. Some intended outcomes could be espionage, sabotage, propaganda, manipulation, or economic warfare.

Many countries, including the United States, United Kingdom, Russia, China, Israel, Iran, India, and North Korea, have active cyber capabilities for offensive and defensive operations. As states explore the use of cyber operations and combine capabilities, the likelihood of physical confrontation and violence playing out as a result of, or part of, a cyber operation is increased. However, meeting the scale and protracted nature of war is unlikely, thus ambiguity remains.

There has been significant debate among experts regarding the definition of cyberwarfare, and even if such a thing exists. One view is that the term is a misnomer, since no cyberattack to date could be described as a war. An alternative view is that it is a suitable label for cyberattacks that cause physical damage to people and objects in the real world.

The first instance of kinetic military action used in response to a cyberattack resulting in the loss of human life was observed on 5 May 2019, when the Israel Defense Forces targeted and destroyed a building associated with a cyberattack.

== Online presence ==
US journalist Pete Earley described his interviews with former senior Russian intelligence officer Sergei Tretyakov, who defected to the United States in 2000:

Sergei would send an officer to a branch of the New York Public Library where he could get access to the Internet without anyone knowing his identity. The officer would post the propaganda on various websites and send it in emails to US publications and broadcasters. Some propaganda would be disguised as educational or scientific reports. ... The studies had been generated at the Center by Russian experts. The reports would be 100% accurate

Tretyakov did not specify the targeted web sites, but made clear they selected the sites which are most convenient for distributing the specific information. According to him, during his work in New York City in the end of the 1990s, one of the most frequent subjects was the War in Chechnya.

According to a publication in Russian computer weekly Computerra, "just because it became known that anonymous editors are editing articles in English Wikipedia in the interests of UK and US intelligence and security services, it is also likely that Russian security services are involved in editing Russian Wikipedia, but this is not even interesting to prove it — because everyone knows that security bodies have a special place in the structure of our [Russian] state"

== Cyberattacks ==
It has been claimed that Russian security services organized a number of denial of service attacks as a part of their cyber-warfare against other countries, such as the 2007 cyberattacks on Estonia and the 2008 cyberattacks on Russia, South Ossetia, Georgia, and Azerbaijan. One identified young Russian hacker said that he was paid by Russian state security services to lead hacking attacks on NATO computers. He was studying computer sciences at the Department of the Defense of Information. His tuition was paid for by the FSB.

The Russian invasion of Ukraine in February 2022 saw renewed interest in information warfare, with the widespread dissemination of propaganda and misinformation on social media, by way of a large-scale Russian propaganda campaign on social media, especially in countries that abstained from voting on the United Nations Resolution ES-11/1 such as India, South Africa, and Pakistan. Bots played a disproportionate role in the dissemination of pro-Russian messages and amplified its proliferation in early-stage diffusion, especially on platforms like Twitter, where pro-Russian messages received ~251,000 retweets and thereby reached around 14.4 million users. Of these "spreaders", around 20.28% of the spreaders are classified as bots, most of which were created at the beginning of the invasion.

=== Estonia ===
In April 2007, following a diplomatic row with Russia over a Soviet war memorial, Estonia was targeted by a series of cyberattacks on financial, media, and government websites which were taken down by an enormous volume of spam being transmitted by botnets in what is called a distributed denial-of-service attack. Online banking was made inaccessible, government employees were suddenly unable to communicate via e-mail, and media outlets could not distribute news. The attacks reportedly came from Russian IP addresses, online instructions were in Russian, and Estonian officials traced the systems controlling the cyberattacks back to Russia. However, some experts held doubts that the attacks were carried out by the Russian government itself. A year after the attack NATO founded the Cooperative Cyber Defence Centre of Excellence in Tallinn as a direct consequence of the attacks.

In response to the 2022 Russian invasion of Ukraine, Estonia has removed a Soviet-era tank monument near Narva. After its removal, Estonia was subject to "the most extensive cyberattack" since the 2007 cyberattacks.

=== Europe ===
In July 2009, central and eastern European leaders – including former presidents Václav Havel, Valdas Adamkus, Aleksander Kwaśniewski, Vaira Vīķe-Freiberga, Lech Wałęsa – signed an open letter stating:

"Our hopes that relations with Russia would improve and that Moscow would finally fully accept our complete sovereignty and independence after joining NATO and the EU have not been fulfilled. Instead, Russia is back as a revisionist power pursuing a 19th-century agenda with 21st-century tactics and methods. [...] It challenges our claims to our own historical experiences. It asserts a privileged position in determining our security choices. It uses overt and covert means of economic warfare, ranging from energy blockades and politically motivated investments to bribery and media manipulation in order to advance its interests and to challenge the transatlantic orientation of Central and Eastern Europe."

— Valdas Adamkus, Martin Bútora, Emil Constantinescu, Pavol Demeš, Luboš Dobrovský, Mátyás Eörsi, István Gyarmati, Václav Havel, Rastislav Káčer, Sandra Kalniete, Karel Schwarzenberg, Michal Kováč, Ivan Krastev, Aleksander Kwaśniewski, Mart Laar, Kadri Liik, János Martonyi, Janusz Onyszkiewicz, Adam Daniel Rotfeld, Vaira Vīķe-Freiberga, Alexandr Vondra, Lech Wałęsa

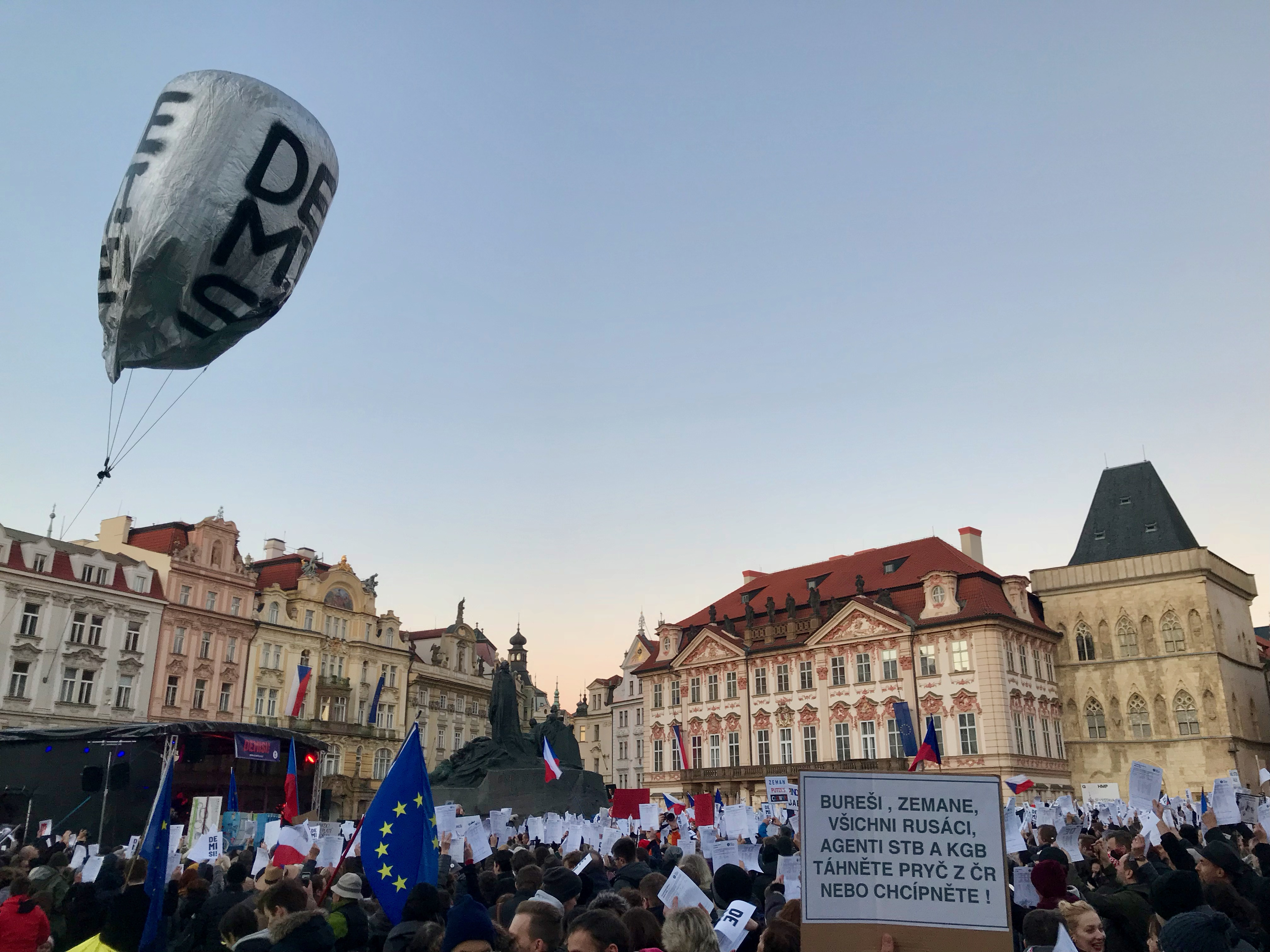
Pro-EU Czechs protest in Prague against Prime Minister Babiš and President Zeman who are accused of pro-Russian sympathies. The sign reads: "...KGB agents go away from the Czech Republic or die!"

Latvian journalist Olga Dragilyeva stated that "Russian-language media controlled by the Russian government and NGOs connected with Russia have been cultivating dissatisfaction among the Russian-speaking part of the population" in Latvia. National security agencies in Lithuania, Estonia and Latvia have linked Moscow to local pro-Russian groups. In June 2015, a Chatham House report stated that Russia used "a wide range of hostile measures against its neighbours", including energy cut-offs, trade embargoes, subversive use of Russian minorities, malicious cyber activity, and co-option of business and political elites.

In 2015, UK media said that the Russian leadership under Putin saw the fracturing of the political unity within the EU and especially the political unity between the EU and the U.S. as among its main strategic goals, one of the means in achieving this goal being rendering support to Europe's far-right and hard Eurosceptic political parties. In October 2015, Putin said that Washington treated European countries "like vassals who are being punished, rather than allies."

On 9 May 2015, on the occasion of the attack by Albanian terrorists in the city of Kumanovo, the Putin-awarded and Russian intelligence agent, as well as pro-Kremlin journalist Daria Aslamova published a commissioned article in the newspaper "Komsomolskaya Pravda", in which there was a map of "united Macedonia", including the "liberated" Pirin part of the region, which was declared "occupied" by Bulgaria. Bulgaria was accused of "supporting Albanian terrorists", regardless of the Bulgarian support it provided to the defense of Macedonia in 2001 and was declared "banished" from Orthodox civilization. In the days, weeks and months after it was written, the article was shared on numerous Rashist and Putinist sites.

In November 2015, the president of Bulgaria, Rosen Plevneliev, said that Russia had launched a massive hybrid warfare campaign "aimed at destabilising the whole of Europe", giving repeated violations of Bulgarian airspace and cyber-attacks as examples. In January 2016, senior UK government officials were reported to have registered their growing fears that "a new cold war" was now unfolding in Europe, with "Russian meddling" allegedly taking on a breadth, range and depth greater than previously thought: "It really is a new Cold War out there. Right across the EU we are seeing alarming evidence of Russian efforts to unpick the fabric of European unity on a whole range of vital strategic issues." The situation prompted the US Congress to instruct James R. Clapper, the U.S. Director of National Intelligence, to conduct a major review of Russian clandestine funding of European parties over the previous decade.

On numerous occasions Russia was also accused of actively supporting United Kingdom withdrawal from the European Union through channels such as Russia Today and the Russian Federation embassy in London. An analysis of the Russian government's English-language news service, Sputnik, found "a systematic bias in favour of the "Out" campaign which was too consistent to be the result of accident or error."

In February 2016, a film circulating in Hungary, in which recruited students expressed anger at the policy of the US, was identified as a version of a Russian movie with the same script funded by a pro-Putin organisation, Officers' Daughters. Published in March 2016, Swedish security service Säpo's annual report stated that Russia was engaged in "psychological warfare" using "extreme movements, information operations and misinformation campaigns" aimed at policy makers and the general public.

In June 2016, Russian Foreign Minister Sergey Lavrov stated that Russia will never attack any NATO country, saying: "I am convinced that all serious and honest politicians know perfectly well than Russia will never attack a member state of NATO. We have no such plans." He also said: "In our security doctrine it is clearly stated that one of the main threats to our safety is the further expansion of NATO to the east."

In late 2016, media in a number of states accused Russia of preparing grounds for a possible armed take-over at their territories in future, including Finland, Estonia and Montenegro. In the latter an armed coup was actually in progress but prevented by security services on the day of election on 16 October, with over 20 people arrested. A group of 20 citizens of Serbia and Montenegro "planned to break into the Montenegro Parliament on election day, kill Prime Minister Milo Djukanovic and bring a pro-Russian coalition to power" according to Montenegro chief prosecutor Milivoje Katnić, adding that the group was led by two Russian citizens who fled the country before the arrest and "unspecified number of Russian operatives" in Serbia who were deported shortly after. A few days after the failed coup Leonid Reshetnikov was dismissed by Putin from his duties as head of Russian Institute for Strategic Studies, which also had its branch in Belgrade where it supported anti-NATO and pro-Russian parties. In 2019, a number of Montenegrin politicians and pro-Russian activists were convicted for the attempted coup as well as two Russian GRU officers Eduard Shishmakov and Vladimir Popov (convicted in absentia).

In 2017, a cache of email was leaked demonstrating funding of far-right and far-left movements in Europe through a Belarusian citizen Alyaksandr Usovsky who funnelled hundreds of thousands of euros from Russian nationalist and oligarch Konstantin Malofeyev and reporting to Russian State Duma Deputy Konstantin Zatulin. Usovsky confirmed the authenticity of the emails.

In 2017, three Alternative for Germany Bundestag deputies confirmed that they together received $29,000 in sponsored private jet visit to Moscow, which caused significant controversy in Germany.

In 2019, a transcript was published from a meeting in Moscow where representatives of Italian nationalist Lega party were offered "tens of millions of dollars" of funding. The delegation to Moscow included Italy's deputy prime minister Matteo Salvini. In 2020 chat transcripts were published by Dutch media of far-right politician Thierry Baudet indicating inspiration on his anti-Ukraine actions and possible financial support from Vladimir Kornilov, a Russian described by Baudet as someone "who works for president Putin".

In 2020, a Spanish court looked at transcripts of calls between a Catalan independence activist Victor Terradellas and a group of Russians who came forward with an offer of up to 10,000 military personnel, pay out of Catalan debt and recognition of Catalan independence by the Russian Federation in exchange for Catalan recognition of Crimea. Frequent arrivals of known GRU operative Denis Sergeev into Spain, coinciding with major Catalan independence events, raised a questions about involvement of GRU Unit 29155 in escalation of the protests.

On 28 April 2021, the European Parliament passed a resolution that condemned Russia's "hostile behaviour towards and outright attacks on EU Member States" explicitly mentioning suspected GRU operation in the Czech Republic in 2014, the poisoning and imprisonment of Alexei Navalny and escalation of the war in Donbas. The resolution called, among other things, for discontinuation of the Nord Stream 2 project.

According to a 2022 report, Russia has spent over $300 million since 2014 on covert subsidies to various political parties and movements globally, including European Union, in exchange of pushing for policies favorable for Russian political goals.

In 2023, an international group of journalists published an analysis of documents prepared in 2021 by Russian Directorate for Cross-Border Cooperation, part of Presidential Administration, detailing plans for interventions securing "strategic interests of the Russian Federation" in Estonia, Latvia, and Lithuania. Russia planned to grow pro-Russian sentiment in these countries, build fear of "NATO militarization", create a large number of pro-Russian NGOs and increase share of pro-Russian politicians in elections. Similar documents published earlier detailed Russia's plans to include Belarus into Russian Federation and return Moldova on pro-Russian path.

=== France ===
In 2015, the Paris-based French broadcasting service TV5Monde was attacked by hackers who used malicious software to attack and destroy the network's systems and take all twelve of its channels off the air. The attack was initially claimed by a group calling themselves the "Cyber Caliphate" however a more in-depth investigation by French authorities revealed the attack on the network had links to APT28, a GRU-affiliated hacker group. In May 2017, on the eve of the French presidential election, more than 20,000 e-mails belonging to the campaign of Emmanuel Macron were dumped on an anonymous file-sharing website, shortly after the campaign announced they had been hacked. Word of the leak spread rapidly through the Internet, facilitated by bots and spam accounts. An analysis by Flashpoint, an American cybersecurity firm, determined with "moderate confidence" that APT28 was the group behind the hacking and subsequent leak.

In February 2021 the Agence nationale de la sécurité des systèmes d'information said that "several French entities" were breached by Sandworm between late 2017 and 2020 by hacking French software company Centreon to deploy malware. Similar to the 2020 United States federal government data breach. The ANSSI said the breach "mostly affected information technology providers, especially web hosting providers". Russia has denied being behind the cyberattack. Centreon said in a statement that it "has taken note of the information" but disputed that the breach was linked to a vulnerability in their commercial software.

=== Georgia ===
On 20 July 2008, the website of the Georgian president, Mikheil Saakashvili, was rendered inoperable for twenty-four hours by a series of denial of service attacks. Shortly after, the website of the National Bank of Georgia and the parliament were attacked by hackers who plastered images of Mikheil Saakashvili and former Nazi leader Adolf Hitler. During the war, many Georgian government servers were attacked and brought down, reportedly hindering communication and the dissemination of crucial information. According to technical experts, this is the first recorded instance in history of cyberattacks coinciding with an armed conflict.

An independent US-based research institute US Cyber Consequences Unit report stated the attacks had "little or no direct involvement from the Russian government or military". According to the institute's conclusions, some several attacks originated from the PCs of multiple users located in Russia, Ukraine and Latvia. These users were willingly participating in cyberwarfare, being supporters of Russia during the 2008 South Ossetia war, while some other attacks also used botnets.

=== Germany ===
In 2015, a high-ranking security official stated that it was "highly plausible" that a cybertheft of files from the German Parliamentary Committee investigating the NSA spying scandal, later published by WikiLeaks, was conducted by Russian hackers. In late 2016, Bruno Kahl, president of the Bundesnachrichtendienst warned of data breaches and misinformation-campaigns steered by Russia. According to Kahl, there are insights that cyberattacks occur with no other purpose than to create political uncertainty. Süddeutsche Zeitung reported in February 2017 that a year-long probe by German intelligence "found no concrete proof of [Russian] disinformation campaigns targeting the government". By 2020 however German investigators had collected enough evidence to identify one suspect.

Hans-Georg Maaßen, head of the country's Federal Office for the Protection of the Constitution, noted "growing evidence of attempts to influence the [next] federal election" in September 2017 and "increasingly aggressive cyber espionage" against political entities in Germany. The New York Times reported on 21 September 2017, three days before the German federal election, that there was little to suggest any Russian interference in the election. In 2021 the European Commission has accused Russia of trying to interfere in European democratic processes just days before the parliamentary election on September 26 in Germany.

=== Kyrgyzstan ===
Beginning in mid-January 2009, Kyrgyzstan's two main ISPs came under a large-scale DDoS attack, shutting down websites and e-mail within the country, effectively taking the nation offline. The attacks came at a time when the country's president, Kurmanbek Bakiyev, was being pressured by both domestic actors and Russia to close a U.S. air base in Kyrgyzstan. The Wall Street Journal reported the attacks had been carried out by a Russian "cyber-militia".

=== Poland ===
A three-year pro-Russian disinformation campaign on Facebook with an audience of 4.5 million Poles was discovered in early 2019 by OKO.press and Avaaz. The campaign published fake news and supported three Polish politicians and their websites: Adam Andruszkiewicz, former leader of the ultra-nationalist and neo-fascist All-Polish Youth and, as of 2019, Secretary of State in the Polish Ministry of Digitisation; Janusz Korwin-Mikke; and Leszek Miller, an active member of the Polish United Workers' Party during the communist epoch and a prime minister of Poland during the post-communist epoch. Facebook responded to the analysis by removing some of the web pages.

=== Romania ===
Between late April and early May 2022, in the midst of the 2022 Russian invasion of Ukraine, multiple Romanian government, military, bank and mass media websites were taken down after a series of DDoS attacks, behind which was a pro-Kremlin hacking group, Killnet. The hacking group described the cyberattacks to be a response to a statement made by then-Senate president, Florin Cîțu that Romania would provide Ukraine with military equipment.

=== South Korea ===
According to two United States intelligence officials that talked to The Washington Post, and also the findings of cybersecurity analyst Michael Matonis, Russia is likely behind the cyber attacks against the 2018 Winter Olympics in South Korea. The worm responsible for these cyber attacks is known as "Olympic Destroyer".

The worm targeted all Olympic IT infrastructure, and succeeded in taking down WiFi, feeds to jumbotrons, ticketing systems, and other Olympic systems. It was timed to go off at the start of the opening ceremonies. It was unique in that the hackers attempted to use many false signatures to blame other countries such as North Korea and China.

=== Ukraine ===
In March 2014, a Russian cyber weapon called Snake or "Ouroboros" was reported to have created havoc on Ukrainian government systems. The Snake tool kit began spreading into Ukrainian computer systems in 2010. It performed Computer Network Exploitation (CNE), as well as highly sophisticated Computer Network Attacks (CNA).

From 2014 to 2016, according to CrowdStrike, the Russian APT Fancy Bear used Android malware to target the Ukrainian Army's Rocket Forces and Artillery. They distributed an infected version of an Android app whose original purpose was to control targeting data for the D-30 Howitzer artillery. The app, used by Ukrainian officers, was loaded with the X-Agent spyware and posted online on military forums. CrowdStrike claims the attack was successful, with more than 80% of Ukrainian D-30 Howitzers destroyed, the highest percentage loss of any artillery pieces in the army (a percentage that had never been previously reported and would mean the loss of nearly the entire arsenal of the biggest artillery piece of the Ukrainian Armed Forces.). According to the Ukrainian army, this number is incorrect and that losses in artillery weapons "were way below those reported" and that these losses "have nothing to do with the stated cause".

The U.S. government concluded after a study that a cyber attack caused a power outage in Ukraine which left more than 200,000 people temporarily without power. The Russian hacking group Sandworm or the Russian government were possibly behind the malware attack on the Ukrainian power grid as well as a mining company and a large railway operator in December 2015. A similar attack occurred in December 2016.

In February 2021 Ukraine accused Russia of attacking the System of Electronic Interaction of Executive Bodies a web portal used by the Ukrainian government to circulate documents by uploaded documents that contained macroscripts which if downloaded and enabled would lead to the computer to secretly download malware that would allow hackers to take over a computer.

In January 2022, a cyberattack on Ukraine took down the website of the Ministry of Foreign Affairs and other government agencies.

In February 2022, before and after Russian troops entered eastern Ukraine amid an environment of escalating tensions between Ukraine and Russia, several major Ukrainian governmental and business websites were taken down by a series of cyberattacks. U.S. officials attributed the attacks to Russian attackers, although the Russian government denied involvement.

==== 2014 Ukrainian presidential election ====
Pro-Russian hackers launched a series of cyberattacks over several days to disrupt the May 2014 Ukrainian presidential election, releasing hacked emails, attempting to alter vote tallies, and delaying the final result with distributed denial-of-service (DDOS) attacks. Malware that would have displayed a graphic declaring far-right candidate Dmytro Yarosh the electoral winner was removed from Ukraine's Central Election Commission less than an hour before polls closed. Despite this, Channel One Russia "reported that Mr. Yarosh had won and broadcast the fake graphic, citing the election commission's website, even though it had never appeared there." According to Peter Ordeshook: "These faked results were geared for a specific audience in order to feed the Russian narrative that has claimed from the start that ultra-nationalists and Nazis were behind the revolution in Ukraine."

=== United Kingdom ===
==== Brexit referendum ====
In the run up to the 2016 referendum on the United Kingdom exiting the European Union ("Brexit"), Prime Minister David Cameron suggested that Russia "might be happy" with a positive Brexit vote, while the Remain campaign accused the Kremlin of secretly backing a positive Brexit vote. In December 2016, Ben Bradshaw MP claimed in Parliament that Russia had interfered in the Brexit referendum campaign. In February 2017, Bradshaw called on the British intelligence service, Government Communications Headquarters, then under Boris Johnson as Foreign Secretary, to reveal the information it had on Russian interference. In April 2017, the House of Commons Public Administration and Constitutional Affairs Select Committee issued a report stating, in regard to the June 2016 collapse of the government's voter registration website less than two hours prior to the originally scheduled registration deadline (which was then extended), that "the crash had indications of being a DDOS 'attack.'" The report also stated that there was "no direct evidence" supporting "these allegations about foreign interference". A Cabinet Office spokeswoman responded to the report: "We have been very clear about the cause of the website outage in June 2016. It was due to a spike in users just before the registration deadline. There is no evidence to suggest malign intervention."

In June 2017, it was reported by The Guardian that "Leave" campaigner Nigel Farage was a "person of interest" in the United States Federal Bureau of Investigation into Russian interference in the United States 2016 Presidential election. In October 2017, Members of Parliament in the Culture, Media and Sport Committee demanded that Facebook, Twitter, Google and other social media corporations, to disclose all adverts and details of payments by Russia in the Brexit campaign.

In December 2023 the UK and its allies have accused Russia of a sustained cyber attacks dating back at least from 2015 until 2023. These attacks have included targeting parliamentarians from various political parties as well as universities, journalists and NGOs. The Star Blizzard group has been named as the group behind the attack is also thought to be subordinate to the Russian government.

=== United States ===
Putin's Asymmetric Assault on Democracy in Russia and Europe: Implications for U.S. National Security

In 1999, Moonlight Maze was the US investigation of a 1996-1999 Russian cyberattack against NASA, the Pentagon, the US military, civilian academics and government agencies. The cyberattack was attributed to Russian-state-sponsored hackers.

The 2008 cyberattack on the United States was connected to Russian language threat actors.

In April 2015, CNN reported that "Russian hackers" had "penetrated sensitive parts of the White House" computers in "recent months". It was said that the FBI, the Secret Service, and other U.S. intelligence agencies categorized the attacks as "among the most sophisticated attacks ever launched against U.S. government systems."

In 2015, CNN reported that Russian hackers, likely working for the Russian government, are suspected in the State Department hack. Federal law enforcement, intelligence and congressional officials briefed on the investigation say the hack of the State Department email system is the "worst ever" cyberattack intrusion against a federal agency.

In February 2016, senior Kremlin advisor and top Russian cyber official Andrey Krutskikh told the Russian national security conference in Moscow that Russia was working on new strategies for the "information arena" that was equivalent to testing a nuclear bomb and would "allow us to talk to the Americans as equals".

In 2016, the release of hacked emails belonging to the Democratic National Committee, John Podesta, and Colin Powell, among others, through DCLeaks and WikiLeaks was said by private sector analysts and US intelligence services to have been of Russian origin. Also, in December 2016, Republicans and Democrats on the Senate Committee on Armed Services called for "a special select committee to investigate Russian attempts to influence the presidential election".

In 2018, the United States Computer Emergency Response Team released an alert warning that the Russian government was executing "a multi-stage intrusion campaign by Russian government cyber actors who targeted small commercial facilities' networks where they staged malware, conducted spear phishing, and gained remote access into energy sector networks." It further noted that "[a]fter obtaining access, the Russian government cyber actors conducted network reconnaissance, moved laterally, and collected information pertaining to Industrial Control Systems." The hacks targeted at least a dozen U.S. power plants, in addition to water processing, aviation, and government facilities.

In June 2019, the New York Times reported that hackers from the United States Cyber Command planted malware potentially capable of disrupting the Russian electrical grid. According to Wired senior writer Andy Greenberg, "The Kremlin warned that the intrusions could escalate into a cyberwar between the two countries."

Over several months in 2020, a group known as APT29 or Cozy Bear, working for Russia's Foreign Intelligence Service, breached a top cybersecurity firm and multiple U.S. government agencies including the Treasury, Commerce, and Energy departments and the National Nuclear Security Administration. The hacks occurred through a network management system called SolarWinds Orion. The U.S. government had an emergency meeting on 12 December 2020, and the press reported the hack the next day. When Russia's Foreign Intelligence Service performs such hacks, it is typically "for traditional espionage purposes, stealing information that might help the Kremlin understand the plans and motives of politicians and policymakers," according to The Washington Post, and not for the purpose of leaking information to the public.

In February 2021 a report by Dragos stated that Sandworm has been targeting US electric utilities, oil and gas, and other industrial firms since at least 2017 and were successful in breaching these firms a "handful" of times.

In May 2021, the Colonial Pipeline ransomware attack was perpetrated by Russian language hacking group DarkSide. It was the largest cyberattack on an energy infrastructure target in US history. Colonial Pipeline temporarily halted the operations of the pipeline due to the ransomware attack. The Department of Justice recovered the bitcoin ransom from the hackers.

Reveiled in 2023, British authorities believed that Star Blizzard engaged in a cyberespionage campaign beginning in at least 2015 against U.K. lawmakers over several years. In December 2023, U.S. authorities charged two Russian men, who are believed to be located in Russia and were associated with the "Callisto Group," which is associated with "Cold River" and "Dancing Salome" and are managed by the FSB Information Security Center (18th Center) (CIB or TsIB FSB), (Note: The FSB Information Security Center (18th Center) (CIB or TsIB FSB) (Russian: Центр информационной безопасности ФСБ (18-й центр) (ЦИБ ФСБ)) is known in London as "Star Blizzard" and in Washington as the "Callisto Group" and is also associated with SEABORGIUM or COLDRIVER or Dancing Salome.) in connection with Star Blizzard's previous actions, which included targeting individuals and groups throughout the United States, Europe and in other NATO countries, many of which were supporting Ukraine during the Russo-Ukrainian War and allegedly attempting to provide foreign malign influence campaigns to influence the United Kingdom's 2019 elections in support of Russian government interests. In December 2023, United States authorities charged Andrey Korinets, (Note: Andrey Stanislavovich Korinets (Russian: Андрей Станиславович Коринец; born 1988 or 1989), also known as Alexey Doguzhev or Alexei Doguzhiev (Russian: Алексей Догужев), is an IT worker and bodybuilder who resides in Syktyvkar and allegedly is a member of "Cold River" which is managed by the FSB Information Security Center (18th Center) (CIB or TsIB FSB) (Russian: Центр информационной безопасности ФСБ (18-й центр) (ЦИБ ФСБ)).) and the alleged FSB officer Ruslan Peretyatko, (Note: Ruslan Aleksandrovich Peretyatko (Russian: Руслан Александрович Перетятько) allegedly is an FSB officer.) who both are members of the "Callisto Group" and were associated with spear-phishing schemes, with conspiracy to commit computer fraud: both individuals were sanctioned by the governments of the United Kingdom and the United States with the United States State Department offering a reward of up to $10 million for information leading to their whereabouts and arrest, as well as the arrest of their accomplices.

In 2024, two members of the Cyber Army Russia Reborn, Yuliya Vladimirovna Pankratova, also known as YUliYA, and Olegovich Degtyarenko were sanctioned, by the U.S. Department of the Treasury for hacking water facilities in both the US and Poland, as well as disrupt operations at a facility in France. Also, the group hacked "the industrial control systems (ICSes) that control water storage tanks in Texas". In early May 2024, Degtyarenko wrote training materials on how to compromise SCADA systems.

In October 2024, the United States Justice Department and Microsoft seized more than a hundred internet domains some of which were associated with the FSB supported hacker Star Blizzard or "Callisto Group," which is also known as "Cold River" and "Dancing Salome" and are managed by the FSB Information Security Center (18th Center) (CIB or TsIB FSB) (Russian: Центр информационной безопасности ФСБ (18-й центр) (ЦИБ ФСБ)), and which were used as "criminal proxies" and used spear-phishing schemes to target Russians living in the United States, nongovernmental organizations (NGOs), think tanks, and journalists according to Microsoft and United States State Department, Department of Energy, and Department of Defense officials, United States defense contractors, and former employees of the United States intelligence community according to the FBI. In some cases, the hackers were successful in obtaining information relating to nuclear energy-related research, United States foreign affairs and United States defense. According to Microsoft's Digital Crimes Unit from January 2023 to August 2024, Star Blizzard targeted more than 30 different groups and at least 82 Microsoft customers which is "a rate of approximately one attack per week." Both the NGO-Information Sharing and Analysis Center, which is a nonprofit tech organization, and Microsoft, which had been tracking Star Blizzard since 2017, provided support during the investigations of Star Blizzard. (Note: During the Russo-Ukrainian War, many cyber attacks on Ukraine allegedly were conducted by GRU Unit 29155.)

=== Venezuela ===
After the news website Runrun.es published a report on extrajudicial killings by the Bolivarian National Police, on 25 May 2019, the Venezuelan chapter of the Instituto de Prensa y Sociedad (IPYS), pointed out that the website was out of service due to an uncached request attack, denouncing that it originated from Russia.

== False alarms ==
On 30 December 2016, Burlington Electric Department, a Vermont utility company, announced that code associated with the Russian hacking operation dubbed Grizzly Steppe had been found in their computers. Officials from the Department of Homeland Security, FBI and the Office of the Director of National Intelligence warned executives of the financial, utility and transportation industries about the malware code. The first report by The Washington Post left the impression that the grid had been penetrated, but the hacked computer was not attached to the grid. A later version attached this disclaimer to the top of its report correcting that impression: "Editor's Note: An earlier version of this story incorrectly said that Russian hackers had penetrated the U.S. electric grid. Authorities say there is no indication of that so far. The computer at Burlington Electric that was hacked was not attached to the grid."

== See also ==
- Cyberwarfare and China
- Cyberwarfare and the United States
- DarkSide (hacking group)
- List of cyber warfare forces
- Military history of the Russian Federation
- Mueller Report
- Timeline of Russian interference in the 2016 United States elections
- Timeline of Russian interference in the 2016 United States elections (July 2016 – election day)
- Web brigades and Internet Research Agency (aka trolls from Olgino)
- Vaccine hesitancy
- Vulkan files leak
