= Ingrid Brocková =

Slovak diplomat

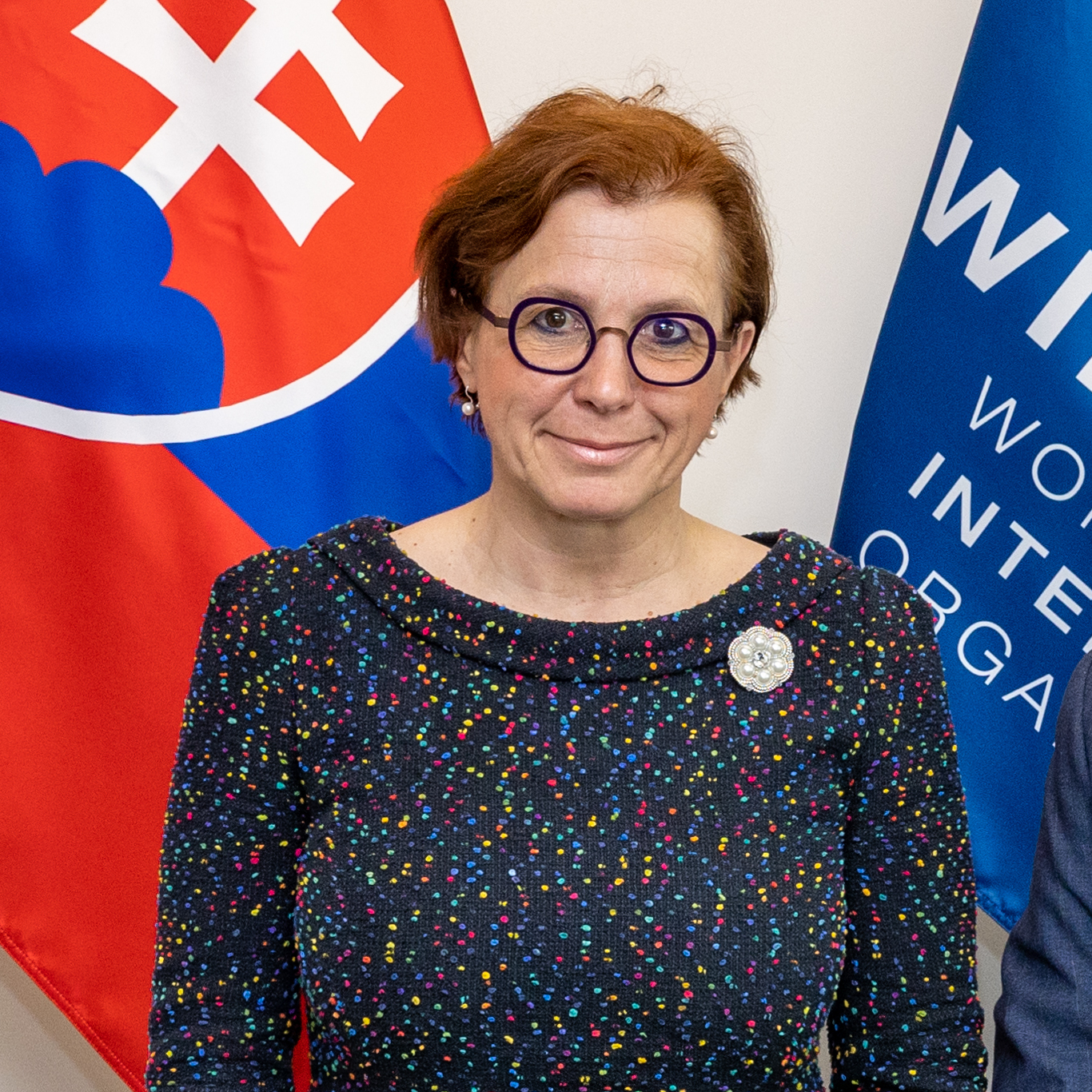

State Secretary at the Ministry of Foreign and European Affairs
- In office 9 April 2020 – 17 September 2023
- Minister: Ivan Korčok; Rastislav Káčer; Miroslav Wlachovský
- Preceded by: Lukáš Parízek

Personal details
- Born: 13 September 1963 (age 62)
- Education: Slovak University of Technology in Bratislava; Comenius University; Johns Hopkins University

Ingrid Brocková (born 13 September 1963) is a Slovak diplomat. From 2020 to 2023 she served as the State Secretary at the Ministry of Foreign and European Affairs. In the past, she had been the World Bank representative in Slovakia (2001-2008) and Slovakia's permanent envoy to OECD (2009-2015).

== Early life ==
Her parents live in Žiar nad Hronom, where she grew up. For her high school years, she went to a ski school in Kežmarok, which was also a boarding school. In 1986 she graduated in Economics at the Slovak University of Technology in Bratislava. She also obtained a Candidate of Sciences degree at the same university in 1991. She also studied International Relations at the Comenius University and International Public Policy at the Johns Hopkins University in the US. Since 1993 she has worked at the Ministry of Foreign and European Affairs of the Slovak Republic in the field of economic diplomacy. From 1996 to 2000, she worked as an economic diplomat to the United States, and from there, for 7 years, a representative of Slovakia to the World Bank. Afterward, from 2009 to 2015, she was Slovakia's permanent envoy to OECD.

Brocková was then, from 2015 to 2017, Director General of the Economic Cooperation Section of the Ministry of Foreign Affairs. She was reappointed as Slovakia's representative to the OECD in 2018.

On 13 September 2023, Brocková resigned from the State Secretary position, effective 17 September. During her time as state secretary she mainly focused on economic diplomacy and relations with international organizations. She left her position as State Secretary to become the Slovak Ambassador to the Czech Republic, handing in her credentials on 18 October 2023 at Prague Castle.
