= Atlantic Treaty Association =

International umbrella organization

- Company type: Incentive
- Industry: umbrella organization
- Founded: 18 June 1954; The Hague, Netherlands
- Headquarters: Brussels, Belgium
- Revenue: 139,000 (2019)
- Subsidiaries: North Atlantic Council
- Website: www.atahq.info

The Atlantic Treaty Association (ATA) is an umbrella organization which draws together political leaders, academics, military officials, and diplomats to support the North Atlantic Treaty Organization (NATO). The ATA is an independent organization that is separate from NATO.

== History ==
The ATA was created on 18 June 1954. Since the end of the Cold War and the dissolution of the Warsaw Pact, the role of the Atlantic Treaty Association has changed considerably. In 1992, the ATA Constitution was amended to accommodate associate members and observers from non-NATO countries. In 1992, the Atlantic Club of Bulgaria joined the ATA as its first associated member from a non-NATO country. Given NATO's shifting nature, the ATA now works beyond the borders of the Euro-Atlantic area, operating in Central and Eastern Europe, the Mediterranean, and the South Caucasus. Following the accession of new NATO countries in 1999 and 2004, ATA membership expanded considerably, and its security focus has shifted south and eastward.

The ATA is active in NATO's Partnership for Peace (PfP) and Mediterranean Dialogue programs and is increasingly engaged with officials and institutions based in members of the Istanbul Cooperation Initiative (ICI) and Partners Across the Globe.

== Mission ==
The Atlantic Treaty Association's stated mission is to support the values set forth in the North Atlantic Treaty: freedom, liberty, peace, security, and the rule of law. As such, the ATA aims to serve as a forum for debate in which member associations can realize common interests and democratic goals. The youth branch of the ATA, the Youth Atlantic Treaty Association (YATA) was created in 1996. YATA seeks to educate and promote debate among youth in order to create responsible future political leaders who have an understanding of the values set forth in the North Atlantic Treaty.

== Structure ==
The statutory bodies governing the ATA are the Assembly and the Board.

=== The Assembly ===
The Assembly stands as the paramount decision-making body within the ATA. It comprises delegates from Member, Associate Member, and Observer Member associations. Each Member and Associate Member, except Observer Members, holds one voting right.

=== The Board ===
The Board, consisting of the President, ten elected Directors, and the ex officio ATA President, plays a crucial role in ATA governance. The ATA President participates specifically in matters concerning youth activities during Board meetings. The ATA President may also extend invitations to individuals to assist in the Board's work.

== Member organizations ==
=== NATO countries ===
- Albania, Albanian Atlantic Association
- Belgium, Association Atlantique Belge
- Bulgaria, The Atlantic Club of Bulgaria
- Canada, NATO Association of Canada
- Croatia, Atlantic Council of Croatia
- Czechia, Jagello 2000
- Denmark, Atlantsammenslutningen
- Estonia, Estonian Atlantic Treaty Association
- Finland, Atlantic Council of Finland
- Germany, Deutsche Atlantische Gesellschaft
- Greece, Greek Association for Atlantic and European Cooperation
- Hungary, Hungarian Atlantic Council
- Iceland, Samtök um Vestraena Samvinnu
- Italy, Comitato Italiano Atlantico
- Latvia, Latvian Transatlantic Organization
- Lithuania, Lithuanian Atlantic Treaty Association
- Netherlands, De Atlantische Commissie
- Norway, Den Norske Atlanterhavskomite
- Portugal, Comissão Portuguesa do Atlântico
- North Macedonia, Euro-Atlantic Club of the Republic of Macedonia
- Romania, Euro-Atlantic Council
- Slovakia, Slovak Atlantic Commission, GLOBSEC
- Slovenia, The Euro-Atlantic Council of Slovenia
- Spain, Asociación Atlantica Española
- Sweden, Swedish Atlantic Council
- Turkey, Türk Atlantik Antlaşması Derneği
- United Kingdom, Atlantic Council of the United Kingdom
- United States, Atlantic Council

=== Partnership for Peace countries ===
- Armenia, Armenian Atlantic Association
- Azerbaijan, Azerbaijan Atlantic Cooperation
- Austria
- Georgia, Georgian Association of Atlantic Collaboration
- Serbia, Atlantic Council of Serbia
- Switzerland
- Ukraine, The Atlantic Council of Ukraine

== Presidents ==
- 1955-1957: Umberto Morra di Lavriano (Italy)
- 1957-1958: Lester B. Pearson (Canada)
- 1958-1961: Ivan Matteo Lombardo (Italy)
- 1961-1963: W. Randolph Burgess (United States)
- 1963-1966: Gladwyn Jebb (United Kingdom)
- 1966-1969: Paul Henri Spaak (Belgium)
- 1969-1972: Sir Frank Roberts (United Kingdom)
- 1972-1976: Eugene V. Rostow (United States)
- 1976-1979: Karl Mommer (Federal Republic of Germany)
- 1979-1982: Muharrem Nuri Birgi (Turkey)
- 1982-1985: Peter Corterier (Federal Republic of Germany)
- 1985-1988: Lord Pym (United Kingdom)
- 1988-1991: Bernardino Gomes (Portugal)
- 1991-1994: William Tapley Bennett Jr. (United States)
- 1994-1997: Haluk Bayulken (Turkey)
- 1997-2000: Theodossios Georgiou (Greece)
- 2000-2003: Alan Lee Williams (United Kingdom)
- 2003–2008: Bob Hunter, former US Ambassador to NATO (United States)
- 2008–2015: Karl A. Lamers (Germany)
- 2015–2020: Fabrizio Luciolli (Italy)
- 2020-2023: James J. Townsend (United States)
- 2023-present: Theodossios Georgiou (Greece)

== See also ==
- Atlanticism
- Euro-Atlantic Partnership Council
- Foreign relations of NATO
- Individual Partnership Action Plan
