= Minister of Foreign and European Affairs =

The Minister of Foreign and European Affairs (Slovak: Minister zahraničných vecí a európskych záležitostí) is the head of the Ministry of Foreign and European Affairs of the Slovak Republic and handles foreign policy of the Slovak Republic.

== Ministers of Foreign Affairs ==
The ministry was founded in 1990 as the "Ministry of International Relations of Slovak Republic". Since 1992, it has been known by the name "Ministry of Foreign Affairs of Slovak Republic". "European Affairs" was added to its name in 2012.

| Name | Portrait | Entered office | Left office | Political party | Cabinet |
|---|---|---|---|---|---|
| Milan Kňažko | | 6 September 1990 | 22 April 1991 | VPN | Mečiar I |
| Ján Čarnogurský (acting) | | 22 April 1991 | 6 May 1991 | KDH | Čarnogurský |
| Pavol Demeš | | 6 May 1991 | 24 June 1992 | Independent | Čarnogurský |
| Milan Kňažko | | 24 June 1992 | 19 March 1993 | HZDS | Mečiar II |
| Jozef Moravčík | | 19 March 1993 | 15 March 1994 | HZDS | Mečiar II |
| Eduard Kukan | | 15 March 1994 | 13 December 1994 | DEÚS | Moravčík |
| Juraj Schenk | | 13 December 1994 | 27 August 1996 | HZDS | Mečiar III |
| Pavol Hamžík | | September 1996 | 11 June 1997 | HZDS | Mečiar III |
| Zdenka Kramplová | | 11 June 1997 | 6 October 1998 | HZDS | Mečiar III |
| Jozef Kalman (acting) | | 6 October 1998 | 30 October 1998 | ZRS | Mečiar III |
| Eduard Kukan | | 30 October 1998 | 15 October 2002 | SDK | Dzurinda I |
| Eduard Kukan | | 15 October 2002 | 4 July 2006 | SDKÚ-DS | Dzurinda II |
| Ján Kubiš | | 4 July 2006 | 26 January 2009 | SMER-SD | Fico I |
| Miroslav Lajčák | | 26 January 2009 | 8 July 2010 | SMER-SD | Fico I |
| Mikuláš Dzurinda | | 8 July 2010 | 4 April 2012 | SDKÚ-DS | Radičová |
| Miroslav Lajčák | | 4 April 2012 | 23 March 2016 | SMER-SD | Fico II |
| Miroslav Lajčák | | 23 March 2016 | 22 March 2018 | SMER-SD | Fico III |
| Miroslav Lajčák | | 22 March 2018 | 21 March 2020 | SMER-SD | Pellegrini |
| Richard Sulík (acting) | | 21 March 2020 | 8 April 2020 | SaS | Matovič |
| Ivan Korčok | | 8 April 2020 | 24 March 2021 | SaS | Matovič |
| Jaroslav Naď (acting) | | 24 March 2021 | 1 April 2021 | OĽaNO | Matovič |
| Ivan Korčok | | 1 April 2021 | 13 September 2022 | SaS | Heger |
| Rastislav Káčer | | 13 September 2022 | 15 May 2023 | none | Heger |
| Miroslav Wlachovský | | 15 May 2023 | 25 October 2023 | none | Ódor |
| Juraj Blanár | | 25 October 2023 | Incumbent | SMER-SD | Fico IV |

== See also ==
- Ministry of Foreign Affairs (Slovakia)
