= Lukáš Parízek =

Slovak politician (born 1986)

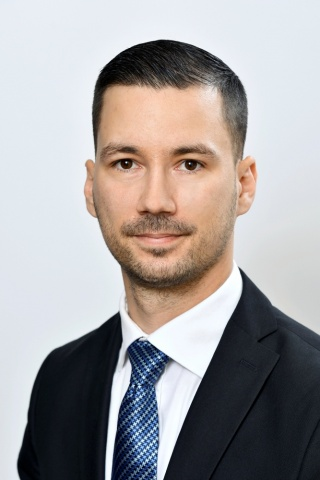
- Parízek in 2021

State Secretary of the Ministry of Foreign and European Affairs of the Slovak Republic
- In office 23 March 2016 – March 2020
- Minister: Miroslav Lajčák
- Preceded by: Igor Slobodník
- Succeeded by: Ingrid Brocková

Special Representative for the Slovak OSCE Chairmanship

Personal details
- Born: 9 September 1986 (age 40) Bratislava, Czechoslovakia (now Slovakia)
- Party: Slovak National Party
- Education: Moscow State Institute of International Relations

Lukáš Parízek (born 9 September 1986) is a Slovak politician, former State Secretary of the Ministry of Foreign and European Affairs of the Slovak Republic, appointed on 23 March 2016 following the Slovak parliamentary elections on 5 March 2016, Special Representative of the OSCE Chairperson-in-Office for the Slovak OSCE Chairmanship and Chairperson of the OSCE 2018 Informal Working Group on Scales of Contributions.

== Early life and education ==
Lukáš Parízek was born and raised in Bratislava. He completed his secondary education in 2006 at the Gymnázium Ivana Horvátha in Bratislava. Between 2006 and 2012, Parízek studied diplomacy at the Moscow State Institute of International Relations in the Russian Federation where he obtained both a bachelor's degree (2010) and a master's degree (2012). He returned to the Slovak Republic to serve in the State administration and joined the National Slovak Party, where he campaigned at the 2016 parliamentary elections. Aside from his native Slovak he also speaks English, Russian, German and notions of Arabic.

== Professional career ==
Ministry of Foreign and European Affairs

- 2016 - State Secretary (Deputy Minister)

Portfolio: security policy, economic diplomacy, development assistance, international organizations as well as bilateral relations with partner countries in Africa, the Americas, Asia, the Pacific and non-EU territories.

Slovak OSCE Chairmanship

As of 1 January 2018, Lukáš Parízek, State Secretary of the Ministry of Foreign and European Affairs of the Slovak Republic was appointed as the Special Representative of the Foreign and European Affairs Minister of the Slovak Republic for Slovakia's Chairmanship of OSCE. In January 2019, Lukáš Parízek was also appointed as Chairperson of the OSCE Informal Working Group on Scales of Contributions.

Lukáš Parízek as Special Representative for the Slovak OSCE Chairmanship has a mandate for the preparation and performance of the Slovak OSCE Chairmanship relating to state administration bodies, local government authorities and other entities.

Most of time he represents the Chairperson-in-Office at international events, conferences and other meetings related to the OSCE Chairmanship, for instance at the a high-level regional conference on countering terrorist financing and organized crime in Ashgabat on April 17–18, 2019.

In terms of his activities, Lukáš Parízek as Special Representative cooperates with advisory bodies of the OSCE and its independent institutions as well as those of the Government of the Slovak Republic.

Thanks to action a special working group chaired by Lukas Parízek as Special Representative of the Minister for the Slovak OSCE Chairmanship, he helped to break the impasse and achieve a tentative solution on the Scales of Contribution for 2019. OSCE participating States find it increasingly difficult to agree on the adoption of the budget on time despite the fact that the size of the budget is modest and has remained unchanged for many years. The Scales of Contribution define how much each of the 57 OSCE participating States annually pay for the OSCE. Despite the fact that Mr. Parízek had the support from 56 out of 57 participating States, and the Slovak Presidency was close to the consensus, Mr. Parízek expressed the belief that "Albania can take it up from here and can hopefully secure the approval in 2020".

Economic diplomacy

Given the fact that Slovakia belongs among countries with the most open economies in the World, Lukáš Parízek is responsible within his portfolio for the adequate diversification of the Slovak economic diplomacy outside Europe. "We need to reflect upon trends and development dynamics of certain countries. Regions such as South America, Asia, notably China, but also Africa are relevant. The latter has big potential in energy and the Slovak Republic can provide high added value – we went through a similar development phase and we have expertise and technology". For this reason Parízek usually brings with him a delegation of Slovak business people on his official visits abroad. As an example, he was the first Slovak official to lead a business delegation to Nigeria in 2016.

Development segment of Foreign Affairs Council of the EU

Lukáš Parízek regularly attends the meetings of the EU development cooperation ministers at the Foreign Affairs Council of the EU currently chaired by Federica Mogherini, High Representative of the European Union for Foreign Affairs and Security Policy and Vice-President of the European Commission. An achievement of the Slovak diplomacy during the first Slovak Presidency of the Council of the European Union (July - December 2016) was the rapid coordination of the EU28 Member States of the Council to deliver a common position towards the establishment of the European Fund for Sustainable Development as part of the External Investment Plan on 28 November 2016.

Slovak Innovation and Energy Agency

- 2015 - 2016 Department of Communication and International Cooperation

Ministry of Defence of the Slovak Republic

- 2014 - 2015 Bilateral Relations Section, International Relations Division, Defence Policy Department
- 2013 - 2015 Defence Assessment Section, Defence Strategy and Management Division

Organization for Security and Co-operation in Europe (OSCE) Secretariat, Vienna, Austria

- 2012 Action against Terrorism Unit, Transnational Threats Department
