= Slovak Atlantic Commission =

The Slovak Atlantic Commission (SAC, Slovak: Slovenská atlantická komisia) is a Slovak independent non-governmental organization, active in the area of domestic and international policy and security.

The Slovak Atlantic Commission was founded in 1993 by Slovak diplomats to support the accession of the Slovak Republic into NATO and EU. At the same time became an observer and associate member of the multinational non-governmental organisation Atlantic Treaty Association (ATA). In 2004 the Slovak Atlantic Commission became a full-fledged member of ATA.

In the early 2000s, the organization was inactive and without budget. It was revived in the early 2000s by Róbert Vass , who later founded the GLOBSEC conference and acted as Secretary General of SAC. Currently, Róbert Vass is the CEO and Executive Vice-President of the Central European Strategy Council, the umbrella organisation for SAC and its partner organisations – the Centre for European Affairs (CEA) and the Central European Policy Institute (CEPI).

An important role in SAC´s history was played by one of its founders, Rastislav Káčer, an experienced Slovak diplomat who has served as Slovakia's ambassador to United States, Hungary and Czech Republic as well as the Minister of Foreign and European Affairs. In 2008, he became the Chairman of the Slovak Atlantic Commission. The Managing Director of SAC is Milan Solár who is also the Programme Director of GLOBSEC.

The Slovak Atlantic Commission’s most important activity is the GLOBSEC Bratislava Global Security Forum, which was founded in 2005 by a group of students around Róbert Vass. The conference grew from humble beginnings to become one of the top conferences of its kind in the world.

SAC has built three distinct pillars representing its core activities:

Strategic Forums – its flagship project is the world-class GLOBSEC Bratislava Global Security Forum, complemented by the Château Béla Central European Strategic Forum.

Transfer of Know How focuses on handing over Central Europe’s recent experience with Euro-Atlantic integration to countries in the Western Balkans, Eastern Europe and Northern Africa.

Youth Leadership Programme - underlines SAC’s long-term commitment to supporting young professionals. Its key project is the annually held GLOBSEC Young Leaders’ Forum (GYLF).
