= Czech and Slovak Transatlantic Award =

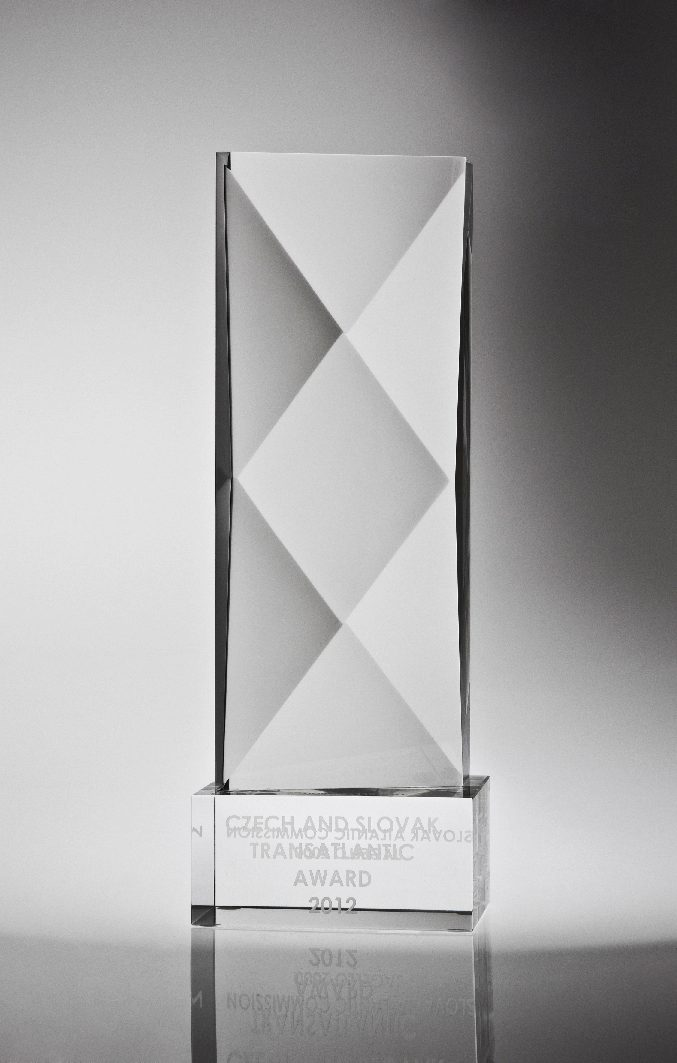
Czech and Slovak Transatlantic Award

The Czech and Slovak Transatlantic Award (CSTA) is an award given to individuals who have substantially contributed to freedom and democracy in Central Europe, to strengthening of transatlantic relations and integration of Central Europe to Euro-Atlantic Institutions. It is awarded by the Jagello 2000 Association for Euro-Atlantic Cooperation from the Czech Republic and implemented jointly by Jagello 2000 and the Slovak Atlantic Commission since 2012. The Awards are presented two times a year: in spring in Slovakia at the GLOBSEC Bratislava Global Security Forum and in autumn at the NATO Days in Ostrava & Czech Air Force Days in Ostrava, Czech Republic. The recipients are Czech, Slovak and international diplomatic and military personalities.

== Honorary Committee ==
The CSTA awardees are chosen by the Honorary Committee, created for this purpose from distinguished personalities from the diplomatic, political and military areas of Czechia and Slovakia. Members of the Honorary Committee are:

- Mikuláš Dzurinda, President of Wilfriend Martens Centre for European Studies, Former Prime Minister and Minister of Foreign Affairs of Slovakia
- Ján Figeľ, Former Special Envoy for the Promotion of the Freedom of Religion or Belief outside the European Union, Former Member of the European Commission
- Štefan Füle, Diplomat, Chairman of the Administrative Board of the Czech China Chamber of Cooperation in Prague, Former European Commissioner for Enlargement and European Neighbourhood Policy
- Rastislav Káčer, Former Chairman of Globsec, Former Minister of Foreign and European Affairs of the Slovak Republic and Ambassador of the Slovak Republic in Prague
- Jan Kohout, Ambassador of the Czech Republic in Roma, Former Deputy Minister of Justice and Minister of Foreign Affairs of the Czech Republic
- Ivan Korčok, Former Minister of Foreign and European Affairs of the Slovak Republic
- Gen. Pavel Macko, Former First Deputy Chief of the General Staff of the Armed Forces of the Slovak Republic
- Zbyněk Pavlačík, CEO & Co-Founder of Jagello 2000
- Jiří Schneider, Former Executive Director of the Aspen Institute Central Europe, Former First Deputy Minister of Foreign Affairs of the Czech Republic
- Gen. (Ret.) Jiří Šedivý, Former Chief of the General Staff of the Armed Forces of the Czech Republic
- Maroš Šefčovič, Executive Vice-President of the European Commission, European Commissioner for the Green Deal, Interinstitutional Relations and Foresight

== List of Awardees ==
Year	Place	Awardee
2012	Bratislava	Ron Asmus (in memoriam), Prominent US diplomat and political analyst
2012	Bratislava	Alexandr Vondra, Former Minister of Defence of the Czech Republic
2012	Ostrava	Gen. (Ret.) Klaus Naumann, Former Chairman of the NATO Military Committee
2012	Ostrava	Jozef Stank (in memoriam), Former Minister of Defence of Slovakia
2013	Bratislava	Jan Krzysztof Bielecki, Former Prime Minister and Minister for European Integration of Poland
2013	Bratislava	Oldřich Černý (in memoriam), Former Director General of the Czech Foreign Intelligence Service
2013	Ostrava	Gen. (Ret.) David Petraeus, Former Commander of the ISAF and Director of the Central Intelligence Agency
2013	Ostrava	Eduard Kukan, Former Minister of Foreign Affairs of Slovakia
2014	Bratislava	Anders Fogh Rasmussen, Former NATO Secretary General and Former Prime Minister of Denmark
2014	Bratislava	Karel Kovanda, Former Permanent Representative of the Czech Republic to the North Atlantic Council and Western European Union
2014	Ostrava	Bronisław Komorowski, President of the Republic of Poland
2014	Ostrava	Martin Bútora, Honorary President of Institute for Public Affairs, Former Slovak Ambassador to the USA
2015	Bratislava	Carl Bildt, Former Prime Minister and Minister of Foreign Affairs of Sweden
2015	Bratislava	Prof. Otto Pick, Founder and Former Director of the Institute of International Relations Prague
2015	Ostrava	Tomasz Siemoniak, Former Deputy Prime Minister and Former Minister of National Defence of the Republic of Poland
2015	Ostrava	František Šebej, Slovak Politician and Academic
2016	Bratislava	Madeleine Albright, Former U.S. Secretary of State
2016	Bratislava	Michael Žantovský, Czech diplomat, politician and author
2016	Ostrava	Daniel Fried, U.S. diplomat
2017	Bratislava	Michael Chertoff, Former United States Secretary of Homeland Security
2017	Bratislava	Luboš Dobrovský, Czech journalist, former Czechoslovak Minister of Defence
2017	Ostrava	Gen. (Ret.) Philip M. Breedlove, Former Supreme Allied Commander Europe (SACEUR)
2017	Ostrava	Pavol Demeš, Former Slovak Minister of International Relations
2018	Bratislava	Damon M. Wilson, Executive Vice President at the Atlantic Council
2018	Bratislava	Gen. Petr Pavel, Former Chairman of NATO Military Committee
2018	Ostrava	Gen. (Ret.) Ben Hodges, Former United States Army Europe Commander (USAREUR)
2018	Ostrava	Ivan Korčok, Minister of Foreign and European Affairs of the Slovak Republic
2019	Bratislava	Timothy Garton Ash, British historian, author and professor at Oxford University
2019	Bratislava	Jiří Šedivý, Former Minister of Defense of the Czech Republic and former Ambassador of the Czech Republic to NATO
2019	Ostrava	Andrej Kiska, Former President of the Slovak Republic
2020	Bratislava	Karel Schwarzenberg, Former Minister of Foreign Affairs of the Czech Republic
2020	Ostrava	Christian Schmidt, Minister of Transport and Digital Infrastructure of the Federal Republic of Germany
2020	Ostrava	Miroslav Lajčák, Former Minister of Foreign and European Affairs of the Slovak Republic
2021	Bratislava	gen. (ret). John Allen, Commander of the NATO International Security Assistance Force and U.S. Forces
2021	Bratislava	Václav Havel (in memoriam), last president of Czechoslovakia and first president of the Czech republic
2021	Ostrava	gen. Richard W. Scobee, Commander of Air Force Reserve Command, U.S. Air Force
2022	Bratislava	Ukrainian nation
2022	Bratislava	gen. Karel Řehka, Chief of the General Staff of the Czech Armed Forces
2022	Ostrava	gen. Ingo Gerhartz, The Inspector of the German Air Force
2022	Ostrava	Jaroslav Naď, Minister of Defence of the Slovak Republic
2023	Bratislava	Kersti Kaljulaid, former President of Estonia
2023	Bratislava	Jaroslav Šedivý (in memoriam), former Minister of Foreign Affairs of the Czech Republic
2023	Ostrava	gen. Daryl L. Bohac, former Adjutant General for the State of Nebraska
2023	Ostrava	gen. Daniel Zmeko, Chief of the General Staff of the Slovak Armed Forces
2024	Prague	Ursula von der Leyen, President of the European Commission
2024	Prague	Mette Frederiksen, Prime Minister of Denmark
2024	Ostrava	Event canceled due to flooding in the Moravian-Silesian Region
2025	Prague	Andrius Kubilius, European Commissioner for Defense and Space, former Prime Minister of the Republic of Lithuania
2025	Prague	Tomáš Pojar, National Security Advisor of the Czech Republic

== Artist's design ==
Original creation of the renowned Slovak glass-designer Patrik Illo, the Czech and Slovak Transatlantic Award symbolizes the transatlantic link by opposite side edges through transparent glass.
