= NATO Days in Ostrava =

Czech security exhibition

NATO Days in Ostrava & Czech Air Force Days Dny NATO v Ostravě & Dny Vzdušných sil AČR
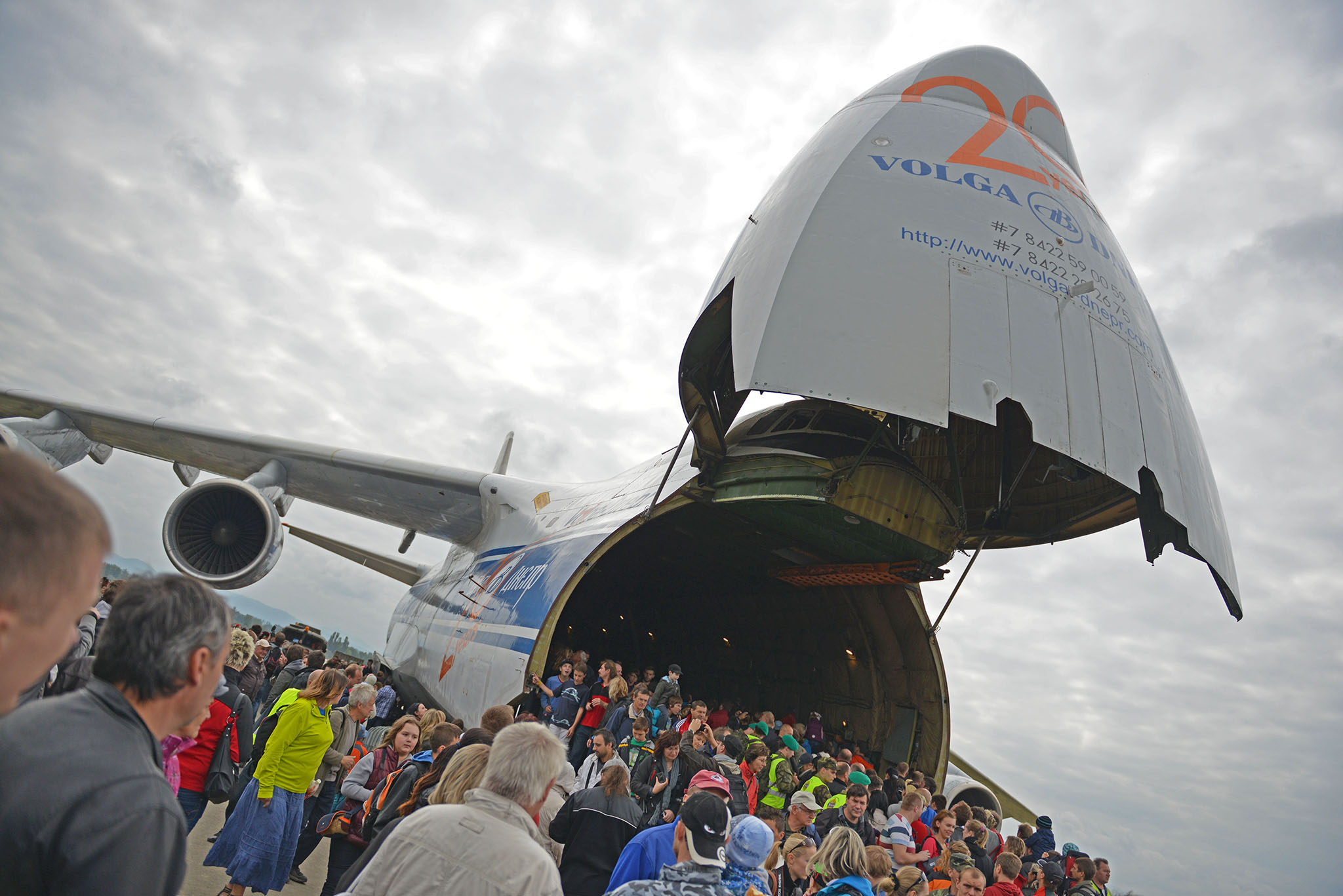
- An-124 Ruslan, NATO Days, 2013
- Status: active
- Genre: Air show
- Dates: the third weekend in September
- Frequency: Annually
- Venue: Leoš Janáček Airport Ostrava
- Location: Ostrava
- Country: Czech Republic
- Years active: 2001-now
- Organizer: Jagello 2000
- Website: www.natodays.cz

NATO Days in Ostrava and Czech Air Force Days (Czech: Dny NATO v Ostravě & Dny Vzdušných sil AČR) are the biggest security show in the Czech Republic. Its goal is to present to the general public the means available to the Czech Republic, its NATO allies and other partner states in the field of security, both international (military) and national. Regular participants thus include the armed forces, components of the Integrated Rescue System (firefighters, police, medical rescue services), customs administration, prison service, municipal police, and others. Entry to the event is free of charge. The event has been held annually since 2001. The first two years were held in Ostrava at Černá louka. Since 2003, the event has been held at Leoš Janáček Ostrava Airport.

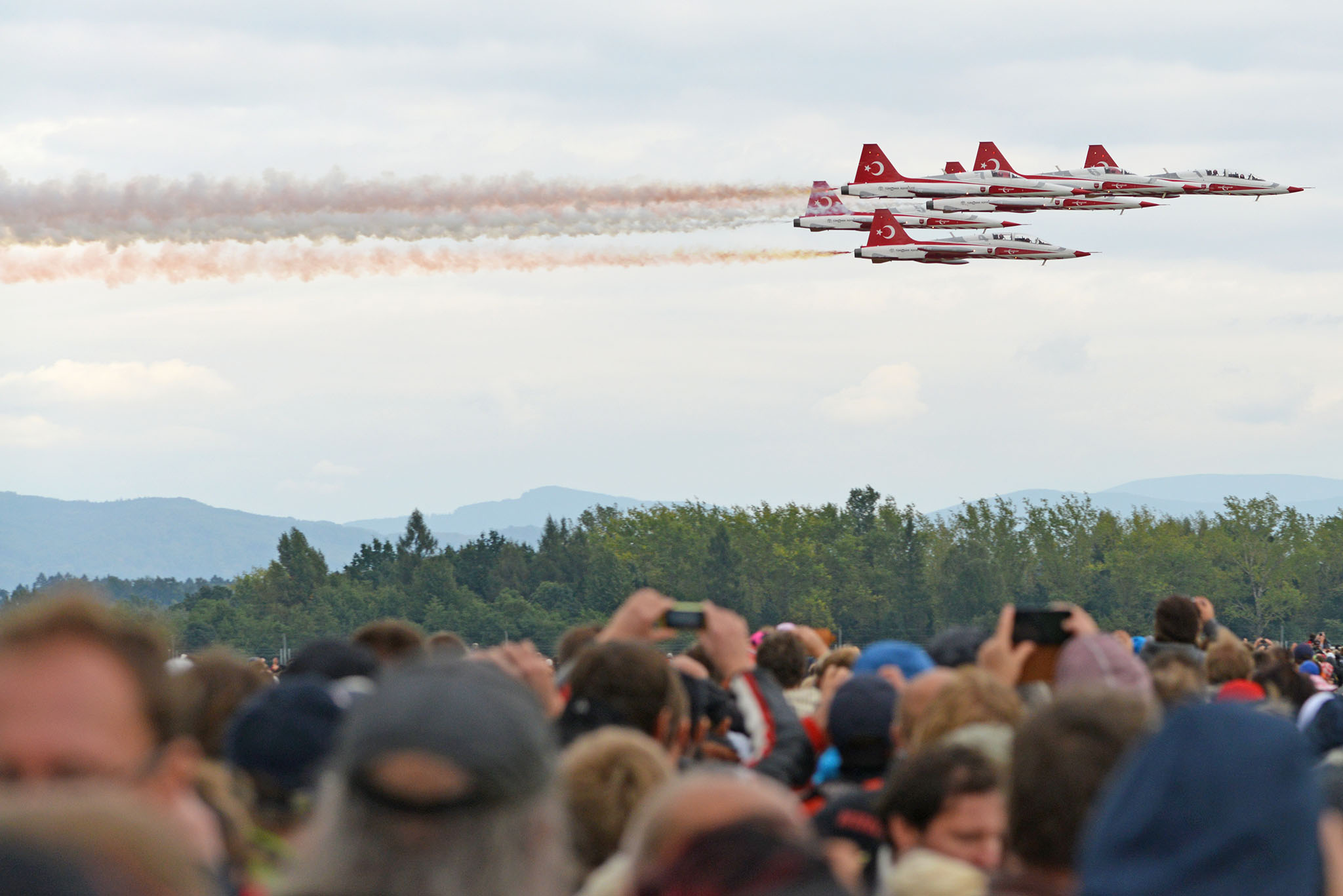
Turkish Stars group during NATO Days, 2013

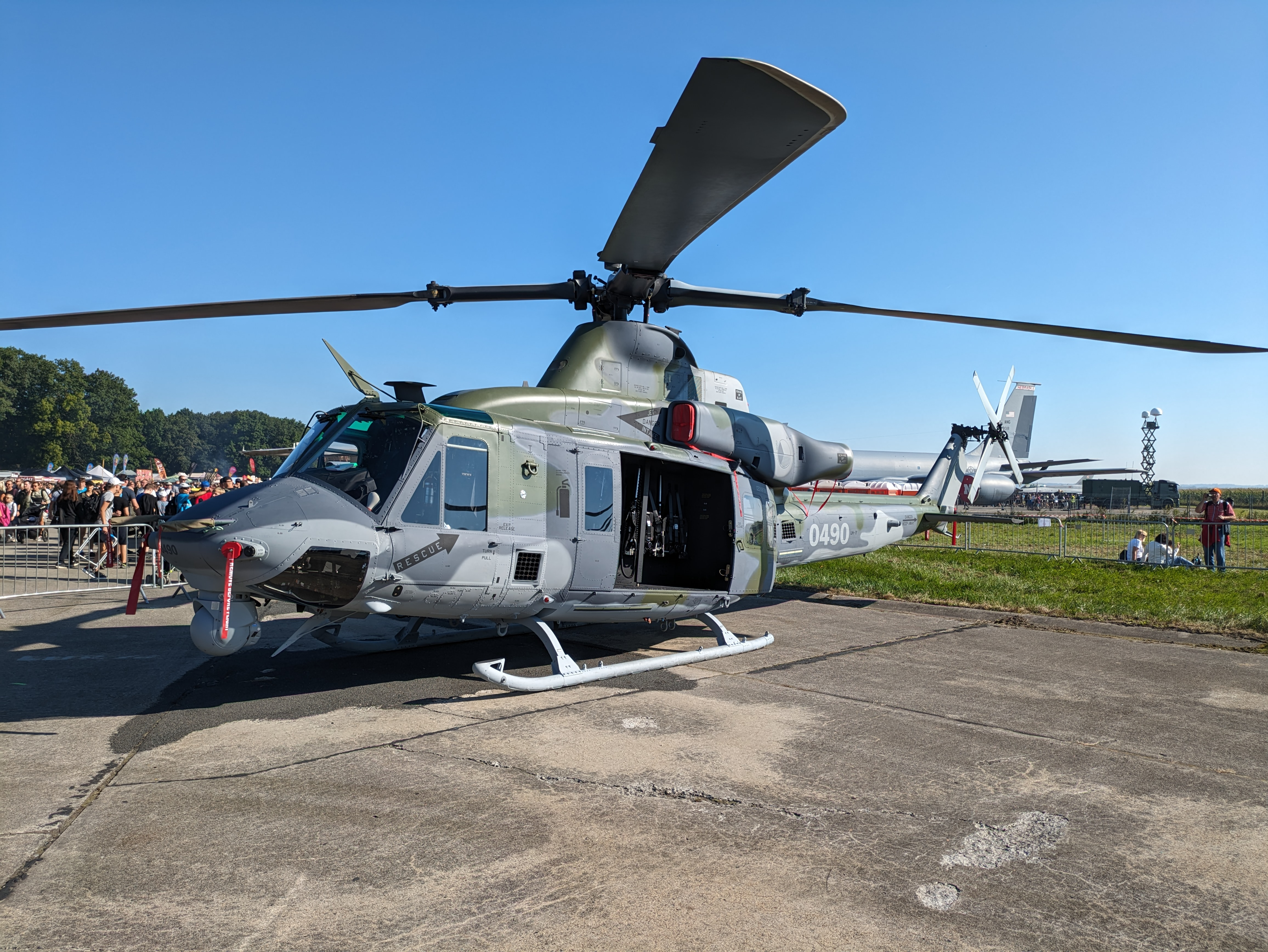
The first delivered Bell UH-1Y to the Czech Air Force on a public display at the airshow in September 2023

== Content of the show ==
Part of the NATO Days are talks, seminars, conferences, and presentations of military and rescue equipment, ending with a weekend program at the airport. It consists of a presentation of heavy military, police and rescue equipment, special unit training displays, aerial displays, and a presentation of Czech and foreign participants' weapons and equipment.

On the occasion of this event, selected personalities are also awarded the Czech and Slovak Transatlantic Award.

Edition	Event date	Attendance (in thousands)	Number of participating countries	Special partner nation	Venue
2001	26.10.2001	10	2		Černá louka
2002	13.09.2002	15	3		Černá louka
2003	13.09.2003	25	2		Mošnov-jih
2004	18.09.2004	40	4		Mošnov-jih
2005	10.09.2005	35	3		Mošnov-jih
2006	16.09.2006	55	4		Mošnov-jih
2007	15.09.2007	60	8		Mošnov-jih
2008	20.09.2008	40	11		Mošnov-jih
2009	19.-20.9.2009	135	14		Mošnov-sever
2010	18.-19.9.2010	185	12		Mošnov-sever
2011	24.-25.9.2011	225	18		Mošnov-sever
2012	22.-23.9.2012	208	20		Mošnov-sever
2013	21.-22.9.2013	145	14		Mošnov-sever
2014	20.-21.9.2014	225	16	Poland	Mošnov-sever
2015	19.-20.9.2015	225	17	Sweden	Mošnov-sever
2016	17.-18.9.2016	130	21	Germany	Mošnov-sever
2017	16.-17.9.2017	90	16	Slovakia	Mošnov-sever
2018	15.-16.9.2018	220	20	USA	Mošnov-sever
2019	21.-22.9.2019	220	18	Romania	Mošnov-sever
2020	19.-20.9.2020	0	9	Czech Republic	Mošnov-sever
2021	18.-19.9.2021	60	19	Sweden	Mošnov-sever
2022	17.-18.9.2022	110	20	NATO	Mošnov-sever
2023	16.-17.9.2023	185	19	Poland	Mošnov-sever
2024	cancelled				
2025	20.-21.9.2025	150	17	Italy	Mošnov-sever
2026	19.-20.9.2026	150	14	Germany	Mošnov-sever

== Organizer ==
The main organizers of the event are the association Jagello 2000, the General Staff of the Army of the Czech Republic, the Moravian-Silesian Region Fire and Rescue Service, the Moravian-Silesian Region Police Regional Directorate, the Moravian-Silesian Region Ambulance Service, and Leoš Janáček Ostrava Airport.

== Partners ==
The event has long been supported by the Ministry of Defense of the Czech Republic, the Ministry of Foreign Affairs of the Czech Republic, the Moravian-Silesian Region, the Statutory City of Ostrava, and NATO's Public Diplomacy Division. In addition to these institutions, long-term partners also include companies from the commercial sector.

== Interesting features of individual editions ==
- 2001 – elite paratroopers from Bielsko-Biała presented themselves at the first edition, making Poland the first foreign country to take part in the event, Poland is also the only country that presented itself at all editions of the NATO Days
- 2002 – Slovakia presented itself as another country which sent its most elite combat unit – the 5th special purpose regiment from Žilina and with its participation supported the candidacy among member countries at the upcoming NATO summit in Prague
- 2003 – since the third edition, the event has been regularly held in mid-September at the Leoš Janáček Airport in Ostrava, the environment of which allows for flight displays, the highlight of the program was the flight display of the Mi-24 combat helicopter of the Army of the Czech Republic. Great Britain got involved for the first time when it presented its BMATT training team from Vyškov
- 2004 – the first participation of the alliance early warning aircraft E-3A Sentry "AWACS" from the NATO air base in Geilenkirchen, Germany
- 2005 – the first participation of foreign air forces: the British Royal Air Force presented the Tornado F3 aircraft
- 2006 – the first participation of the US Air Force and also the first performance of the acrobatic group - the British Red Arrows
- 2007 – the first presentation of the Eurofighter Typhoon in Central and Eastern Europe thanks to the British Air Force, a unique presentation of the Merkava Mk I tank from the collections of the Military Historical Institute
- 2008 – participation of Ukrainian heavy transport aircraft An-124 Ruslan
- 2009 – move to the northern part of the airport, expansion of the program to the whole weekend, the first participation of the American strategic transport aircraft C-5 Galaxy
- 2010 – thanks to the decision of gen. Jiří Verner, the first Czech Air Force Days were also held as during the NATO Days in Ostrava; the first participation of the American strategic bomber B-52H Stratofortress
- 2011 – the first participation of the Turkish Stars aerobatic group on the NF-5 supersonic aircraft, the presentation of the Israeli Air Force (two F-15D Baz fighters and a C-130 Hercules transport aircraft)
- 2012 – the first display of simulated in-flight refueling performed by Czech Gripens, the French C-135FR aircraft served as a tanker, the return of the British Red Arrows group, the Czech and Slovak Transatlantic Award was awarded for the first time
- 2013 – the first participation of the helicopter acrobatic group – the Spanish Patrulla ASPA
- 2014 – the first European presentation of the CV-22B Osprey convertible of the American special forces, the first participation of the Czech president, Miloš Zeman, in the event, the introduction of the concept of the Special Partner Nation, the first country presented in this way was Poland
- 2015 – participation of the giant Dutch tanker KDC-10, the first introduction of the Jordanian army's female response unit
- 2016 – presentation of the Italian aerobatic group Frecce Tricolori, a unique gathering of Eurofighter aircraft from all five of their European operators
- 2017 – participation of the aerobatic group Saudi Hawks, for the first time the participation of ground military equipment from three foreign countries (Germany, Poland, Slovakia)
- 2018 – celebratory flyover to mark the 100th anniversary of independent Czechoslovakia, special presentation of historical technology
- 2019 – presentation of three acrobatic groups (French Patrouille de France, Finnish Midnight Hawks and Swiss PC-7 Team), a unique joint performance of aerial acrobat Martin Šonka on the racing special Extra 300 and capt. Ivo Kardoš on the JAS-39 Gripen of the Czech Air Force, the world public premiere of the L-39NG aircraft
- 2020 – due to the coronavirus pandemic, the year 2020 took place without visitors, the program was broadcast live via Czech television and social networks, a "Stronger Together" flyover with the participation of Czech and American aircraft, a joint flyover of Gripens of the Czech, Hungarian and Swedish air forces, a reconstruction of the Battle of Štítin to 75th anniversary of the end of World War II
- 2021 – due to the coronavirus epidemic, attendance is limited to a maximum of 40,000 per day, the first Czech presentation of the 5th generation F-35 Lightning II aircraft by the Italian Air Force, the first public presentation of the MQ-9 Reaper unmanned drone, the participation of the British C-47 Dakota military aircraft
- 2022 – the first participation of a South American country in the form of a Brazilian C-390 aircraft, the first presentation of the JAS-39 Gripen E aircraft, the first participation of the Swiss Patrouille Suisse group, a fly-by of the Dutch F-35 Lightning II, an international Welcome to NATO fly-by to symbolically welcome Finland and Sweden as future members of the North Atlantic Alliance
