= Juraj Blanár =

Slovak politician (born 1966)

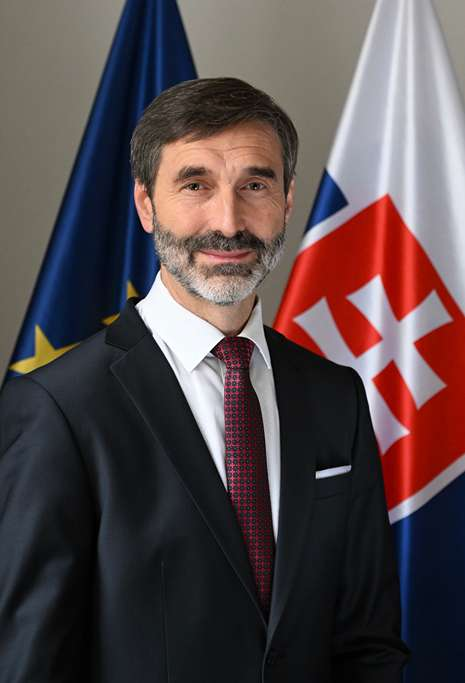
- Blanár in 2023

Minister of Foreign and European Affairs
- Incumbent
- Assumed office 25 October 2023
- Prime Minister: Robert Fico
- Preceded by: Miroslav Wlachovský

Deputy Speaker of the National Council
- In office 21 October 2020 – 25 October 2023 Serving with Gábor Grendel, Milan Laurenčík and Juraj Šeliga
- Speaker: Boris Kollár

Member of the National Council
- In office 8 July 2010 – 25 October 2023
- In office 15 October 2002 – 4 July 2006

Governor of the Žilina Region
- In office 2005–2017
- Preceded by: Jozef Tarčák
- Succeeded by: Erika Jurinová

Personal details
- Born: 19 May 1966 (age 60) Žilina, Czechoslovakia (now Slovakia)
- Party: Direction – Social Democracy
- Spouse: Viera Blanárová
- Children: 3
- Education: University of Žilina (Ing.)

Juraj Blanár (born 16 May 1966) is a Slovak politician. He is currently the minister of Foreign and European Affairs of Slovakia. He served as a member of the National Council from 2002 to 2006 and again from 2010 to 2023. Blanár was a Deputy Speaker of the National Council from 2020 until 2023. Between 2005 and 2017 he served as the governor of the Žilina Region. He is a member of the Direction – Social Democracy party.

== Early life ==
Juraj Blanár was born on 16 May 1966 in Žilina. He studied at the University of Žilina. Before starting his political career, Blanár worked for the construction company Váhostav in his hometown.

== Political positions ==
=== Foreign policy ===
Regarding the Russian invasion of Ukraine, Blanár opposes military help for Ukraine and supports improving diplomatic relations with Russia. He was one of the few Slovak MPs who did not vote for a parliamentary resolution condemning Russian killings of Ukrainian civilians passed after the Bucha massacre.

In 2022, then Foreign Affairs minister of Slovakia Ivan Korčok accused Blanár of supporting Russian conquest of Ukraine. Blanár later strongly opposed the defense agreement with the United States, arguing that it will eventually lead to US bases on Slovak soil.

=== Social issues ===
Blanár is pro-life and supported initiatives aimed at reducing access to abortion in Slovakia.

In March 2023, on the question of closure of shops on Sundays, Blanár spoke in favour of the ban with conditions.

== Personal life ==
Blanár is married and has three children.
