= NATO Association of Canada =

Canadian non-governmental organization

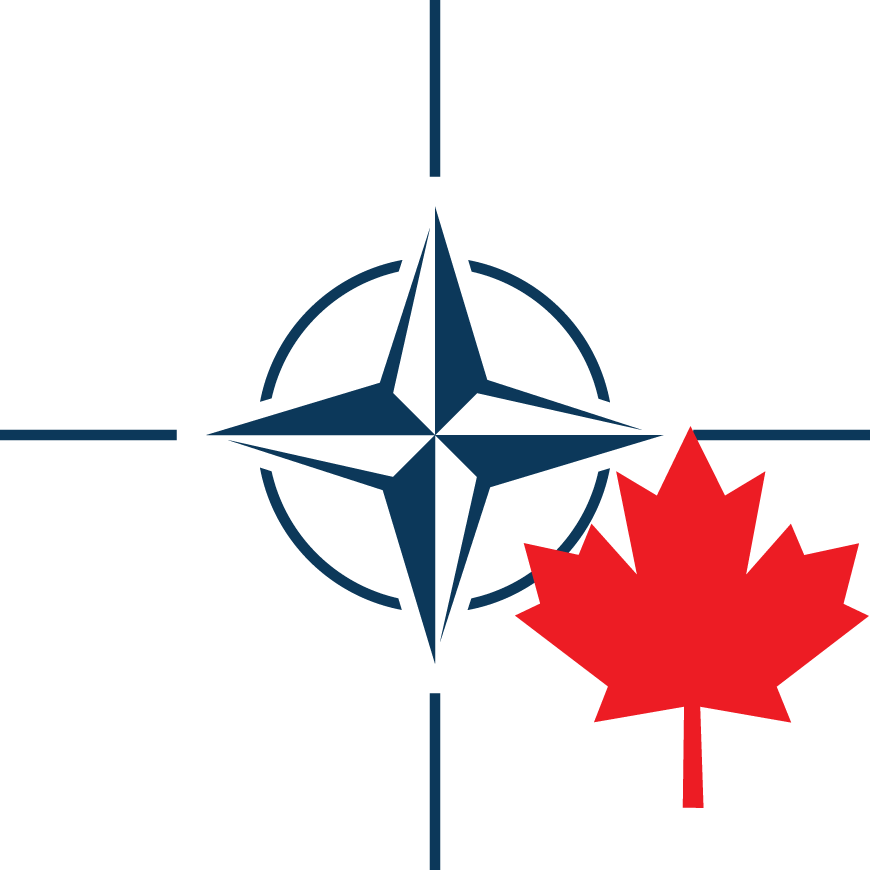
- Abbreviation: NAOC
- Formation: 1966; 60 years ago
- Type: Registered charity
- Purpose: Promote knowledge and understanding of NATO
- Headquarters: Toronto, Ontario, Canada
- Key people: Robert Baines (President) Spencer Carew (Youth President)
- Affiliations: Atlantic Treaty Association
- Website: natoassociation.ca
- Formerly called: Atlantic Council of Canada

The NATO Association of Canada (NAOC; formerly the Atlantic Council of Canada) is a non-governmental organization that was founded in 1966 to promote knowledge and understanding of the North Atlantic Treaty Organization (NATO) in Canada.

== About ==
NAOC is a member of the Atlantic Treaty Association (ATA) that is headquartered in Brussels, Belgium. The ATA coordinates similar organizations in forty other NATO member states and Partnership for Peace (PFP) nations. According to its website, NAOC's mission is to "promote peace, prosperity, and security through knowledge and understanding of the importance of NATO."

The organization is chaired by former Minister of Defence David Collenette, while Robert Baines serves as its President and CEO. NAOC operates from its national office in downtown Toronto, Ontario, supported by a team of professional staff, volunteers, and interns across the country, including in Vancouver, Calgary, and Montreal.

NAOC organizes and promotes a variety of events, including conferences, seminars, roundtable discussions, as well as speaker dinners and lunches. It also hosts an annual Spring Conference in Toronto and a Fall Conference in Ottawa. To educate Canadians about NATO, NAOC publishes several articles per week on topics related to peace, prosperity, and security.

== See also ==
- Canada in NATO
