= GLOBSEC =

Conference organization in Slovakia

GLOBSEC is a non-partisan, non-governmental organisation based in Bratislava, Slovakia. One of its main activities is the annual GLOBSEC Bratislava Global Security Forum, in existence since 2005. Other projects include the Tatra Summit conference on European affairs or Chateau Béla Central European Strategic Forum. Its think-tank called GLOBSEC Policy Institute boasts a wide research area based on four pillars (see below). Its main outputs are policy papers and analyses on different topics in the area of international politics and security issues. Since 2016, GLOBSEC is not only the name of one of the top forums on international security worldwide, but also of the legal entity and organiser of the Forum.

== GLOBSEC Bratislava Forum ==
Since its establishment in 2005, GLOBSEC Bratislava Forum has been held annually in Bratislava, the capital of the Slovak Republic and has become one of the world's top five security conferences. Its 2016 edition hosted more than 1.000 participants from 70 countries. Its main topics include global security, transatlantic cooperation and international relations. Throughout its history, GLOBSEC has hosted prominent speakers such as Pope Francis, David Cameron, Madeleine Albright, Anders Fogh Rasmussen, Ursula von der Leyen, Michael Chertoff, John McCain, Zbigniew Brzezinski and many others.

== History ==
The GLOBSEC organisation builds upon the tradition of the Slovak Atlantic Commission (SAC), established in 1993 by a group of Slovak diplomats. The aim of SAC was to facilitate the integration of Slovakia into NATO and the European Union. These goals were achieved in 2004 and a year later, SAC was joined by a group of students from the Matej Bel University in Banská Bystrica, Slovakia. In 2005, this group, led by future GLOBSEC President Róbert Vass, established the annual GLOBSEC Bratislava Global Security Forum.

=== Central European Strategy Council ===
Slovak Atlantic Commission gradually expanded its scope of activities and created two sister organisations – a think-tank called Central European Policy Institute (CEPI) and the Centre for European Affairs (CEA). In 2013, Tatra Summit, an annual conference on European affairs and economy, was established. This network of organisations was consequently united under the umbrella entity called Central European Strategy Council, with Ambassador Rastislav Káčer acting as its Honorary Chairman and Róbert Vass as the CEO and Executive Vice-president.

=== GLOBSEC as an Organisation ===
In 2016, at the 11th annual GLOBSEC Forum, Róbert Vass announced that the whole network known as Central European Strategy Council would be rebranded as GLOBSEC while expanding its activities to achieve a larger outreach. The think-tank CEPI thus became GLOBSEC Policy Institute, expanding its research area. GLOBSEC Policy Institute organises its activities around four main programmes:

- Security and Defence
- Energy
- Future of Europe
- European Neighbourhood

== Transparency ==
In 2023, GLOBSEC saw a diverse range of financial contributions. Throughout the year, GLOBSEC collaborated with a total of 87 partners, encompassing both institutional and corporate entities. No entity contributed to funding with more than 10% of annual revenue.

Overview of Globsec Partners and Donors in 2023: Erasmus+, European Investment Bank, European Commission, Global Engagement Center, Government of Canada, Horizon 2020, Ministry of Defence of the Slovak Republic, Ministry of Economy of the Slovak Republic, Ministry of Finance of the Slovak Republic, Ministry of Foreign Affairs of the Slovak Republic, Ministry of Investment, Regional Development and Informatics of the Slovak Republic, National Bank of Slovakia, NATO PDD, Slovak Investment Holding, Stiftung Muencher, Taiwanese government, UK FCDO, US mission to EU.

== Partnerships ==
GLOBSEC has had partnerships with the National Endowment for Democracy, Brookings, and the Atlantic Council.

== Activities ==
- GLOBSEC Bratislava Global Security Forum
- GLOBSEC Policy Institute; a think-tank that conducts research, publishes surveys, analyses, policy papers and recommendations.
- GLOBSEC Young Leaders’ Forum (GYLF); held annually in parallel with the main GLOBSEC Forum, GYLF gathers dozens of young individuals from many countries to offer them the chance to learn about policy-making, diplomacy and to interact with GLOBSEC participants.
- Tatra Summit; an annual forum on European affairs.
- Château Béla Central European Strategic Forum; an annual forum held under the Chatham House Rule.
- GLOBSEC Academy Centre; officially established on 26 April 2016, this joint project of GLOBSEC and the Matej Bel University in Banská Bystrica aims to educate the next generation of experts and analysts on global security and foreign affairs.
- Czech and Slovak Transatlantic Award (CSTA); The Czech and Slovak Transatlantic Award is a joint project by GLOBSEC and Czech NGO Jagello 2000. Since 2012, the Award annually honours personalities who have significantly contributed to the quality of transatlantic relations. Some of its most prominent laureates include Madeleine Albright, Carl Bildt, Bronislaw Komorowski, David Petraeus and many others.
