= Atlantic Council of Serbia =

The Atlantic Council of Serbia (Serbian: Атлантски савет Србије, romanized: Atlantski savet Srbije) is a non-governmental and non-profit organization in Serbia. Founded in 2001, the organization promotes Serbia's Euro-Atlantic integration.
