= Kadri Liik =

Estonian journalist

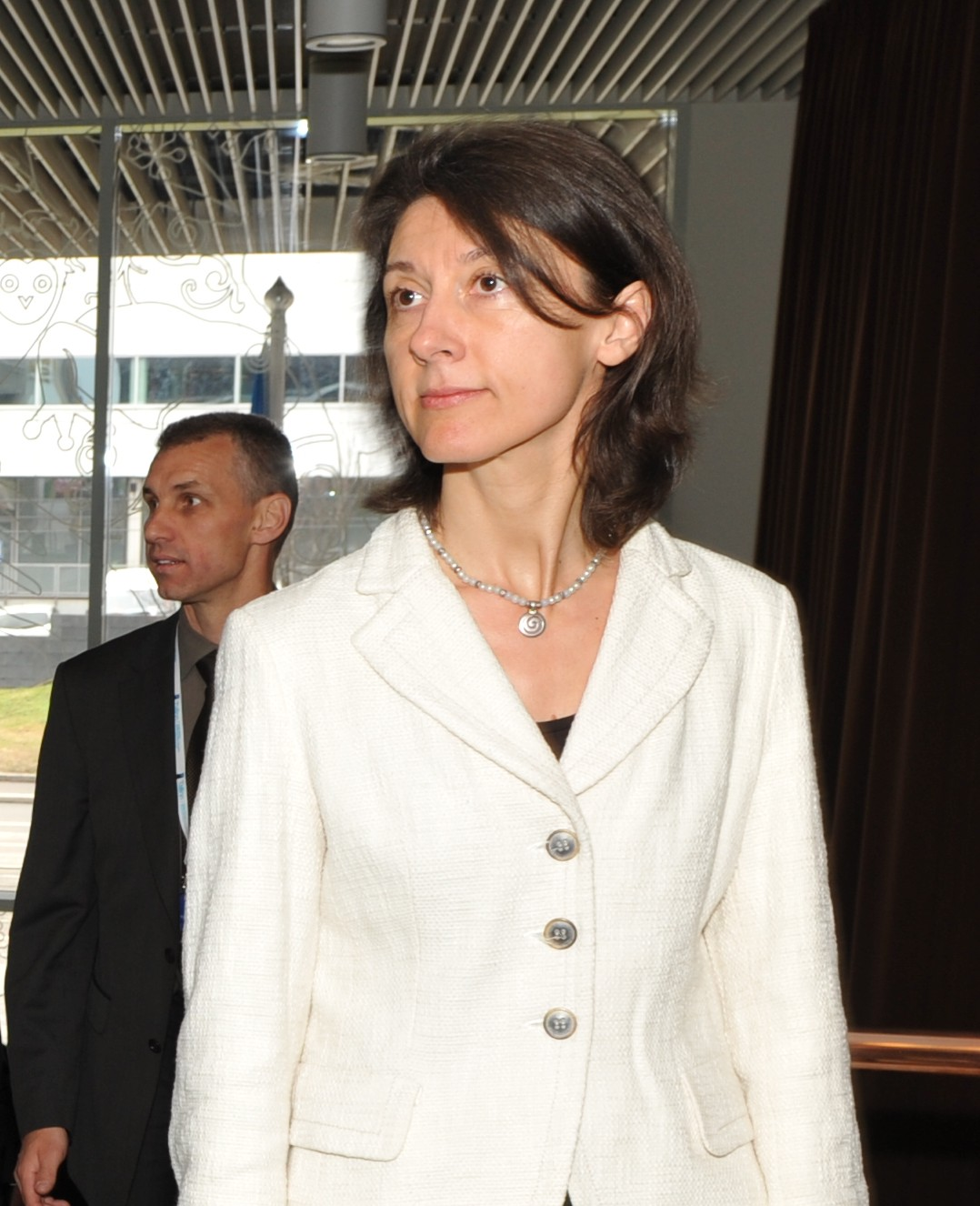
Kadri Liik

Kadri Liik is an Estonian journalist and political analyst. Her research is mainly focused on Russia, Eastern Europe, and the Baltic region.

She is graduated from the University of Tartu in journalism, and Lancaster University in diplomacy.

In 1990s she worked as a Moscow correspondent for Estonian newspapers (like Postimees) and also for news agency Baltic News Service. Since 2004 she was the chief editor of the magazine Diplomaatia. In 2000s she was also the host of current affairs talkshow "Välismääraja", broadcast on Radio Kuku. 2006-2011 she was the director of the International Centre for Defence Studies in Estonia.

Since 2012, she is working as a senior policy fellow at the European Council on Foreign Relations.
