= István Gyarmati =

Hungarian political scientist

István Gyarmati is a Hungarian political scientist. He is a member of the council of the International Institute for Strategic Studies. He is senior advisor on South East Europe at the Geneva Centre for the Democratic Control of Armed Forces, and chairman of the Centre for Euro-Atlantic Integration and Democracy.
