= Miroslav Wlachovský =

Slovakian diplomat (born 1970)

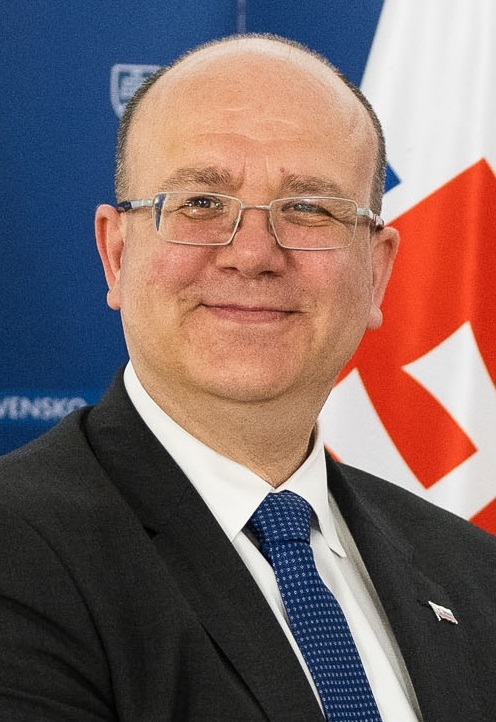
- Wlachovský in 2023

Minister of Foreign and European Affairs
- In office 15 May 2023 – 25 October 2023
- Prime Minister: Ľudovít Ódor
- Preceded by: Rastislav Káčer
- Succeeded by: Juraj Blanár

Personal details
- Born: 3 February 1970 (age 56) Bratislava, Czechoslovakia
- Party: Independent
- Education: Comenius University
- Occupation: Diplomat

Miroslav Wlachovský (born 3 February 1970) is a Slovak diplomat. He served as the Minister of Foreign and European Affairs of Slovakia from May to October 2023. Previously he served as Slovak ambassador to the United Kingdom from 2011 to 2015 and to Denmark from 2018 to 2022.

== Biography ==
Wlachovský was born on 3 February 1970 in Bratislava. He studied philosophy and sociology at the Comenius University, graduating in 1994. Following his graduation until 1998, he worked with the think tank Slovak Foreign Policy Association.

== Diplomatic career ==
Wlachovský joined the Ministry of Foreign Affairs. Between 2001 and 2003 he was a foreign policy advisor to the Prime Minister Mikuláš Dzurinda. From 2003 to 2007 he worked at the Slovak embassy in the US and from 2009 to 2011 at the Slovak embassy to the international institutions in Vienna. From 2011 to 2015 he was the Slovak ambassador to the UK and from 2018 to 2022 to Denmark.

=== Minister of Foreign Affairs ===
On 12 May 2023, the president Zuzana Čaputová announced Wlachovský will serve in the caretaker cabinet of Ľudovít Ódor as the Minister of Foreign Affairs. Officially, he became the minister on 15 May.

== Personal life ==
In 2012, Wlachovský received an award from the Slovak Olympic and Sports Committee for promoting sports and athletic values.
