= Ivan Korčok =

Slovak politician (born 1964)

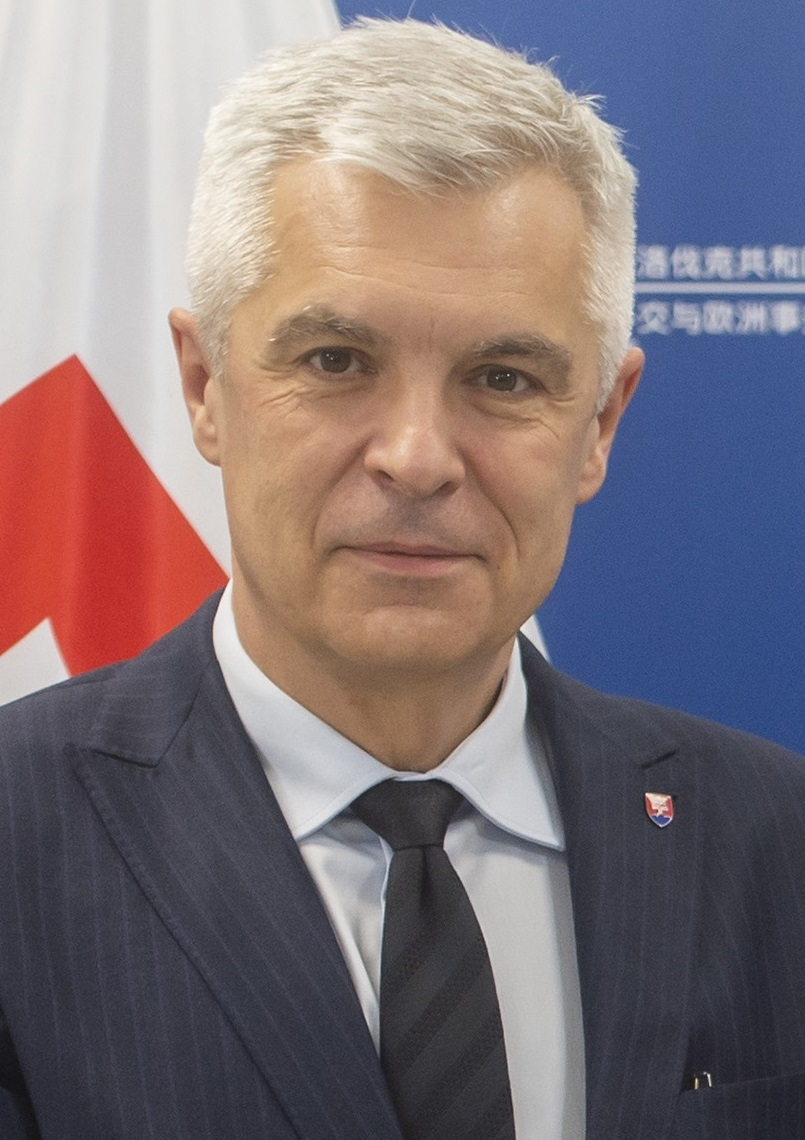

Minister of Foreign and European Affairs
- In office 1 April 2021 – 13 September 2022
- Prime Minister: Eduard Heger
- Preceded by: Jaroslav Naď (acting)
- Succeeded by: Rastislav Káčer
- In office 8 April 2020 – 24 March 2021
- Prime Minister: Igor Matovič
- Preceded by: Richard Sulík (acting)
- Succeeded by: Jaroslav Naď (acting)

Undersecretary of Foreign and European Affairs
- In office 2015–2018
- Minister: Miroslav Lajčák
- In office 2002–2005
- Minister: Eduard Kukan

Ambassadorial Positions
- 2018–2020: United States
- 2009–2015: European Union
- 2005–2009: Germany

Personal details
- Born: 4 April 1964 (age 62) Banská Bystrica, Czechoslovakia (now Slovakia)
- Party: Progressive Slovakia (since 2024)
- Spouse: Soňa Korčoková
- Children: 2
- Education: Comenius University
- Website: ivankorcok.sk

Ivan Korčok (born 4 April 1964) is a Slovak politician and retired executive diplomat who was Minister of Foreign and European Affairs of Slovakia from 2020 to 2022 as an independent nominee of the Freedom and Solidarity political party.

A graduate of the University of Economics in Bratislava and the Institute of International Relations at Comenius University, Korčok served as a career diplomat at various ranks from 1992 to 2020. In August 2023, Korčok announced his candidacy in the 2024 Slovak presidential election.

Korčok placed first in the preliminary round with 42% of the votes ahead of second-place finisher Peter Pellegrini who received 37%. However, Korčok lost the runoff receiving 47% of the vote to Pellegrini's 53%.

== Early life ==
From 1983 to 1987, Korčok studied at the University of Economics in Bratislava, and subsequently undertook postgraduate studies at the Institute of International Relations of Comenius University in Bratislava from 1991 to 1995.

== Diplomatic career (1992–2020) ==
In 1992, Korčok began working at the Ministry of International Relations of the Slovakia, and from 1993 to 1996 was the secretary of the Slovak embassy in Bonn, Germany. From 1996 to 1997 he was the spokesperson of the Ministry of Foreign Affairs and worked in the Analysis and Planning Department from 1997 to 1998. From 1998 to 1999, he worked as a counselor and chargé d'affaires at the Slovak embassy in Switzerland. Between 1999 and 2001, he was the Deputy Ambassador of the Permanent Mission to NATO.

Between 2001 and 2005, he worked again at the Ministry of Foreign Affairs, as director general of the Section of International Organizations and Security Policy, later state secretary. He was a member of the European Convention between 2002 and 2003.

Korčok served as the Slovak Ambassador to Germany between 2005 and 2009. Subsequently, from 2009 to 2015, he was the permanent representative of Slovakia to the European Union and was then the representative of the government in the Council of the EU until 2017. Between 2015 and 2018, he was again the State Secretary at the Ministry of Foreign Affairs and European Affairs.

In August 2018, he was appointed Slovak ambassador to the United States by President Andrej Kiska. After Korčok handed over his credentials to US President Donald Trump in September, he became the seventh Slovak ambassador to the United States.

== Political career (2020–present) ==
Following the 2020 parliamentary elections, Korčok was nominated by the Freedom and Solidarity party to be Minister of Foreign and European Affairs. On the day of the appointment of the Matovič government on 21 March 2020, Korčok could not travel out of the United States due to restrictions on air travel due to the COVID-19 pandemic. On his return to Slovakia, he underwent a 14-day quarantine, while Deputy Prime Minister Richard Sulík was entrusted with the management of the Foreign Ministry. Korčok was officially appointed as a member of the government on April 8. Korčok served as the Minister of Foreign and European Affairs in the Cabinet of Igor Matovič from April 2020 until the collapse of the government in late March 2021. One week later, he was appointed back to the position in the new Cabinet of Eduard Heger. He resigned in September 2022 alongside other ministers nominated by the Freedom and Solidarity party due to major disagreements with Igor Matovič, the party leader of OĽANO, the largest coalition party.

Following President Zuzana Čaputová's announcement that she would not run for reelection, Korčok was cited by the media as potential candidate to replace her in the 2024 presidential election. When asked in June 2023, Korčok stated that he was considering running for the position. He officially announced his candidacy in August 2023, with polling at that time estimating between 30% and 35% of the vote in the first round. Running as an independent candidate, the political parties Freedom and Solidarity, Progressive Slovakia, Christian Democratic Movement and the non-parliamentary Democrats endorsed his candidacy. In the first round on 23 March, Korčok achieved 42.51% and advancing to a runoff against former prime minister Peter Pellegrini. On 6 April 2024, in the second round, Korčok with 46.88% lost to Pellegrini with 53.12%.

== Personal life ==
Korčok is married to his wife, Soňa, with whom he has two sons.

== Honours and awards ==
- 2018: Czech and Slovak Transatlantic Award

Diplomatic posts
Preceded by Ján Foltín	Slovak Ambassador to Germany; 2005–2009	Succeeded by Igor Slobodník
Preceded by Peter Kmec	Slovak Ambassador to the United States; 2018–2020	Succeeded by Radovan Javorčík
Political offices
Preceded by Richard Sulík; Acting	Minister of Foreign and European Affairs; 2020–2021	Succeeded by Jaroslav Naď; Acting
Preceded by Jaroslav Naď; Acting	Minister of Foreign and European Affairs; 2021–2022	Succeeded by Rastislav Káčer
