= Pavol Demeš =

Slovak politician (born 1956)

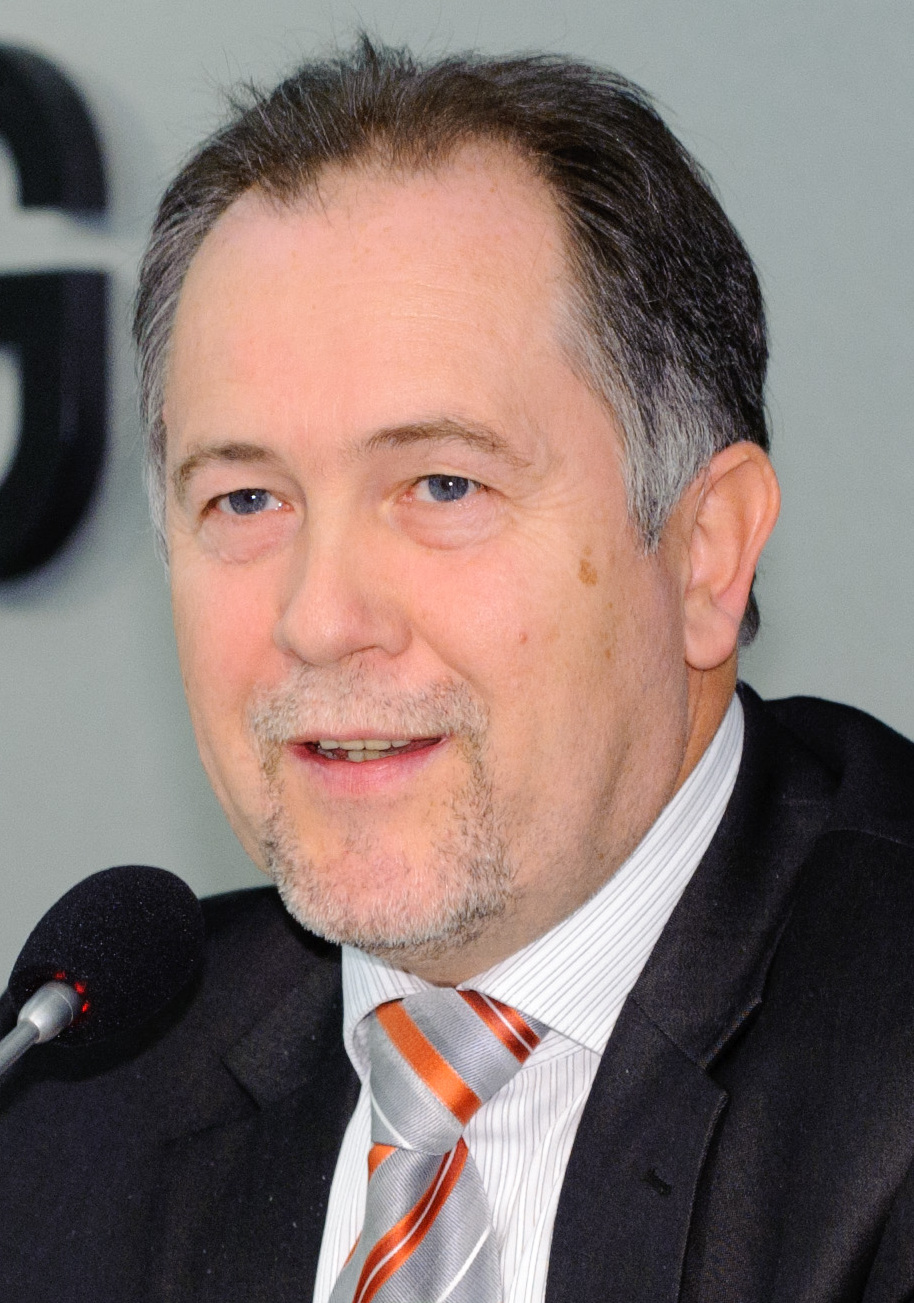

Slovak Minister of External Affairs in the Czechoslovak Confederated Government. The Federal Minister of Foreign Affairs was Jiri Dienstbier until dissolution in 1993
- In office 6 May 1991 – 24 June 1992
- Premier: Ján Čarnogurský
- Preceded by: Ján Čarnogurský
- Succeeded by: Milan Kňažko

Personal details
- Born: 8 January 1956 (age 70) Vráble, Czechoslovakia
- Party: ODÚ
- Children: 2
- Education: Comenius University; Charles University
- Occupation: Politician, civil activist

Pavol Demeš (born 8 January 1956) is a Transatlantic Fellow at the German Marshall Fund's Bratislava office, who served as the Slovak Minister for External Affairs from 1991 to 1992 - in the Czechoslovak Confederated Government after the Velvet Revolution. The Federal Minister of Foreign Affairs was Jiri Dienstbier until dissolution between the Czech Republic and Slovakia in January 1993.
