= Rastislav Káčer =

Slovak diplomat and Minister of Foreign Affairs

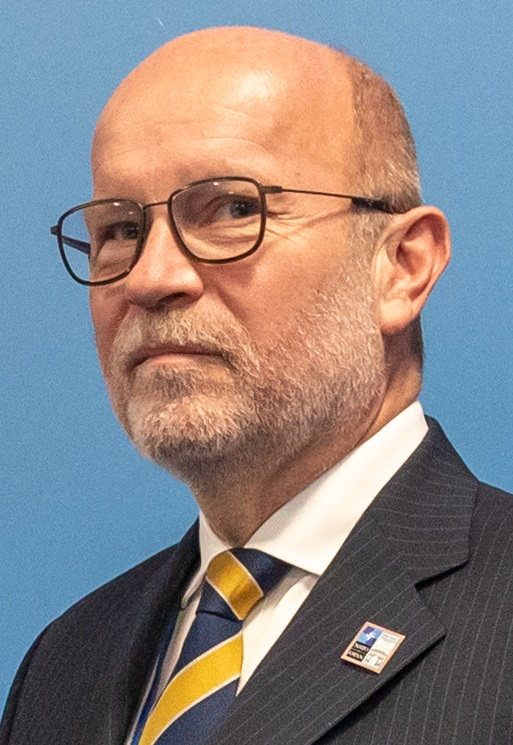
- Káčer in 2022

Minister of Foreign and European Affairs
- In office 13 September 2022 – 15 May 2023
- Prime Minister: Eduard Heger
- Preceded by: Ivan Korčok
- Succeeded by: Miroslav Wlachovský

Personal details
- Born: 9 June 1965 (age 61) Nová Baňa, Czechoslovakia
- Education: Slovak University of Technology in Bratislava; Comenius University

Rastislav Káčer (born 9 July 1965) is a Slovak diplomat, former ambassador of Slovakia to US, Hungary and the Czech Republic. From September 2022 to May 2023, Káčer served as the Minister of Foreign and European Affairs of Slovakia.

== Early years ==
Káčer self-declared himself as a three-quarter Slovak and quarter Hungarian with familial origin from Tekov region. Káčer studied primary and secondary schools in Žarnovica and Nitra. After graduating high school, he was unable to study Medicine due to his opposition to the Communist regime. After working in a factory for a year, he managed to enroll at the Slovak University of Technology in Bratislava to study Chemistry. After graduating in 1989, he worked for two years as a Researcher in an Agricultural research institute in Nitra. Following the Velvet Revolution, Káčer studied International relations at the Comenius University, graduating in 1995.

== Career in diplomacy ==
Káčer has been employed at the Ministry of Foreign Affairs since 1992. Between 1994 and 1998, he served as the first Secretary of Slovak delegation to NATO. Between 2001 and 2003 he served as the State Secretary at the Defense ministry responsible from admission negatiotions with NATO.

Between 2003 and 2008 Káčer served as the Slovakia's ambassador in the United States. After the end of his tenure, he co-founded the influential Slovak think tank GLOBSEC. Between 2013 and 2018 he served as the ambassador to Hungary. His decision to join over 30 countries that displayed the rainbow flag on their embassy buildings in Budapest to support the pride parade was criticized by anti-LGBT activists in Slovakia.

Between 2018 and 2020 Káčer served as the ambassador in Czech Republic.

== Foreign minister ==
Following the departure of the Freedom and Solidarity party from the government coalition, Káčer was asked by the Defense Minister Jaroslav Naď with the blessing of Prime Minister Eduard Heger to replace the Freedom and Solidarity nominee Ivan Korčok as the Foreign minister. Káčer accepted to facilitate continuation of pro-Western and pro-European foreign policy of his predecessor, including crucially the support for Ukraine in the Russo-Ukrainian War.

== Political views ==
Káčer is strongly supportive of Slovakia's pro-Western orientation and denounced the pro-Russian views of Prime Minister Robert Fico. He is a staunch critic of former Hungarian Prime Minister Viktor Orbán and Russian president Vladimir Putin. He strongly supports arms transfers to Ukraine, including the transfer of Slovakia's S-300 missile system to aid Ukraine's defenders. He also strongly supports international sanctions against Russia to remain in place for as long as Russia keeps occupying Ukraine's territory including Crimea.

Káčer considers himself a liberal conservative. In 2023, Káčer briefly served as a deputy chairman of the Democrats party, but decided to leave politics in May 2023.

== Other activities ==
- Trilateral Commission, Member of the European Group
