= Ministry of Foreign and European Affairs (Slovakia) =

Government ministry of Slovakia

- Ministerstvo zahraničných vecí a európskych záležitostí Slovenskej republiky

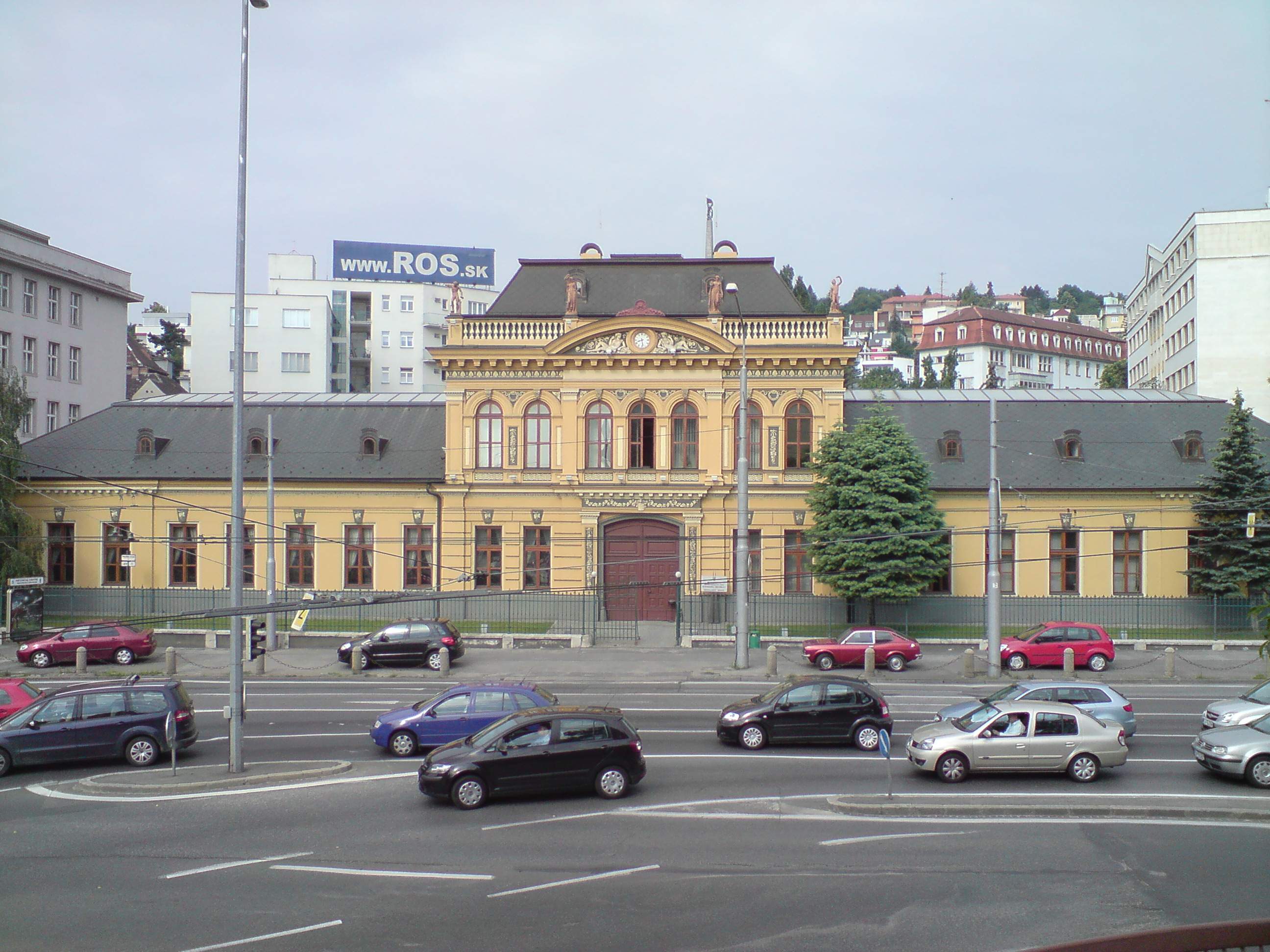

Agency overview
- Formed: 1990
- Preceding agency: Ministry of Foreign Affairs of Czechoslovakia
- Jurisdiction: Slovakia
- Headquarters: Bratislava
- Employees: 1237
- Annual budget: €137 million (2019)
- Minister responsible: Juraj Blanár
- Website: mzv.sk

The Ministry of Foreign and European Affairs (Slovak: Ministerstvo zahraničných vecí a európskych záležitostí) is responsible for maintaining the Slovak Republic's external relations and the management of its international diplomatic missions.

The current minister is Juraj Blanár.

== History ==
After the peaceful dissolution of the former Czechoslovakia in 1993, Slovakia became an independent nation and has maintained official diplomatic relations with other nations since then.

== Diplomacy ==
The ministry oversees Slovakia's affairs with foreign entities, including bilateral relations with individual nations and its representation in international organizations, including the European Union, the United Nations, NATO and the OECD. The ministry also holds responsibility for matters related to international trade, the rights of its expatriates, monitoring human rights and crisis situations abroad, and the spread of information about Slovakia internationally. The ministry is also involved in the affairs of the Visegrád Group (V4), a grouping of Central European states—Slovakia, the Czech Republic, Hungary and Poland—established for the purpose of furthering the four nations' European integration.

== See also ==
- Minister of Foreign Affairs (Slovakia)
- List of diplomatic missions of Slovakia
