= 2025 in Slovakia =

- Decades: 2000s; 2010s; 2020s
- See also: Other events of 2025; History of Slovakia • Years

Events in the year 2025 in Slovakia.

== Incumbents ==
- President: Peter Pellegrini
- Prime Minister: Robert Fico

== Events ==
=== January ===
- 1 January –
  - Russian gas stops flowing to Slovakia and Moldova through the territory of Ukraine. Before the transit was ended, Slovakia was the last major importer of gas through the pipeline, after the rest of the EU had gradually shifted to other gas sources after the Russian invasion of Ukraine.
  - A revised official version of the national anthem Nad Tatrou sa blýska by Oskar Rózsa is broadcast for the first time.
- 10 January – 2025 Slovak protests: Fifteen thousand people attend a rally in Bratislava to protest against the pro-Russian orientation of Fico's Fourth Cabinet. Smaller protests are held in other cities.
- 16 January – Two people are killed in a stabbing at a high school in Spišská Stará Ves. A student is arrested.
- 24 January – 2025 Slovak protests: Over 130,000 people attended protests in cities across Slovakia against the pro-Russian foreign policy of the government.
- 27 January – Prime Minister Robert Fico announces plans for constitutional amendments to the Constitution of Slovakia. One would place the constitution higher than international treaties and agreements, another would formally recognize only two genders (Male and female), restrict "gender transition" and prohibit the adoption of children by same-sex couples.

=== February ===
- 19 February – The Fico coalition government announces a cabinet reshuffle in which Hlas and the Slovak National Party relinquish one cabinet ministry each to the SMER party of Prime Minister Robert Fico.
- 26 February – The Slovak National Party criticises Fico for his support for United Nations General Assembly Resolution ES-11/7, suggesting that Slovakia should have opposed the resolution in line with Hungary's position.

=== March ===
- 20 March – Five people are killed in a fire that destroys 30 houses in Veľký Šariš.
- 30 March – A man is found dead following a bear attack near Detva, prompting the government to declare a state of emergency in 55 counties and approve the culling of 350 bears on 2 April.

=== April ===
- 9 April – The National Council of Slovakia passes the government's constitutional amendment into the second reading. Of the 143 deputies who voted, 81 support it (Smer-Hlas-SNS), 40 are against and 22 abstain. In addition to the government deputies, the proposal is also supported by opposition deputies Christian Union.

=== May ===
- 28 May – The government approves the public sale of meat originating from culled brown bears.
- 29 May – The Special Criminal Court convicts National Bank of Slovakia governor Peter Kažimír of paying a 48,000 euro ($54,000)-bribe in 2017-18 to the head of the national tax office over a tax audit of private firms and imposes a fine of 200,000 euros ($225,000).

=== June ===
- 11–28 June – 2025 UEFA European Under-21 Championship

=== September ===
- 8 September – A World War II-bomb is discovered at a construction site in Bratislava, prompting the evacuation of part's of the city's downtown.
- 26 September – The National Council of Slovakia passes the government's constitutional amendment. It will give national law precedence over EU law, only two genders (Male and female), ban surrogacy and adoption by same-sex couples. It will also include equal pay for men and women.

=== October ===
- 13 October – Two trains collide near Rožňava, injuring 66 people.
- 17 October – SMER is expelled from the Party of European Socialists in a unanimous vote for violations of the group's values by party leader Robert Fico.
- 21 October – The Specialised Criminal Court in Banská Bystrica convicts Juraj Cintula of terrorism for the attempted assassination of Robert Fico in 2024 and sentences him to 21 years' imprisonment.

=== November ===
- 9 November – A train rear-ends another train near Pezinok, injuring 79 people.

=== December ===
- The Slovak parliament passed a bill that would make anyone who questions the Beneš decrees punishable by up to six months imprisonment.

=== Ongoing ===
- 2025 Slovak protests (2024–present)

== Holidays ==
- 1 January – Day of the Establishment of the Slovak Republic
- 6 January – Epiphany
- 18 April – Good Friday
- 21 April – Easter Monday
- 1 May – Labour Day
- 8 May – Victory in Europe Day
- 5 July – St. Cyril and Methodius Day
- 29 August – Slovak National Uprising Anniversary
- 1 September – Constitution Day
- 15 September – Our Lady of Sorrows Day
- 1 November – All Saints' Day
- 17 November – Freedom and Democracy Day
- 24 December – Christmas Eve
- 25 December – Christmas Day
- 26 December – Saint Stephen's Day

== Art and entertainment ==
- List of Slovak submissions for the Academy Award for Best International Feature Film

== Deaths ==
- 2 January: Ján Zachara (96), boxer, Olympic champion (1952).
- 11 January: Zora Palová (77), glass artist.
- 14 January: Ladislav Hučko (76), Ruthenian Greek Catholic hierarch, apostolic exarch of the Czech Republic (since 2003).
- 31 January: Táňa Radeva (67), actress (Bathory, Lóve, Dubček).
- 5 February: Ján Cuper (78), politician, MP (1992–2006).
- 3 March: Jozef Markuš (80), politician, deputy prime minister (1989–1990), president of Matica slovenská (1990–2010).
- 6 March: Dušan Čaplovič (78), politician, minister of education (2012–2014), MP (2002–2020).
- 14 March: Peter Hric (59), Olympic cyclist (1996).
- 21 March: Štefan Kvietik (90), actor (The Boxer and Death, The Millennial Bee, Sitting on a Branch, Enjoying Myself).
- 23 March: Marianna Grznárová (83), writer.
- 13 April: Roland Vími (55), Olympic table tennis player (1992).
- 14 April: Alexander Ruttkay (83), archaeologist and historian.
- 19 April Jaroslav Kubečka (90), economist and politician.
- 20 April: Vladimír Popovič (85), painter, visual artist, and academic.
- 21 April: Alexander Vika (91), sculptor.
- 24 April: Ladislav Polka (73), politician, MP (1992–2006).
- 2 June:
  - Eva Borušovičová (55), director, screenwriter and writer (Janosik: A True Story).
  - Gustáv Mráz (90), footballer (Inter Bratislava, Czechoslovakia national team).
- 7 June: Marek Košút (36), footballer (Nitra, Šaľa, Galanta).
- 19 June: Ján Ľupták (79), politician, MP (1992–1998).
- 27 June: Juraj Soboňa (64), politician, MP (2018–2020).
- 13 July: Rostislav Prokop (58), footballer (DAC 1904 Dunajská Streda, 1. FK Drnovice).
- 21 July: Ivan Laluha (92), historian, academic and politician, MP (1992–1994).
- 2 August: Peter Veselovský (60), ice hockey player (TJ VSŽ Košice, Hockey Club de Caen, Dunaújvárosi Acélbikák).
- 17 August: Oldo Hlaváček (91), actor and screenwriter.
- 20 August: Anna Záborská (77), politician, MP (1998–2004, since 2020) and MEP (2004–2019).
- 16 September: Yehuda Zvi Blum (93), Slovak-born Israeli legal scholar, permanent representative to the United Nations (1978–1984).
- 25 September: Juraj Bartusz (91), sculptor and academic (Technical University of Košice).
- 2 October: Miroslav Kráľ (77), Olympic footballer (1968).
- 7 October: Ľudmila Gajdošíková (71), politician and jurist, judge of the Constitutional Court of Slovakia (2000–2019).
- 17 October: Milan Dobeš (96), painter and graphic artist.
- 24 October: Ján Nagy (80), Olympic weightlifter (1976).
- 12 November: Juraj Lexmann (84), musicologist and composer.
- 23 November: Mikuláš Krnáč (78), Olympic footballer (1968).
- 6 December: Oľga Feldeková (82), writer and satirist.
- 10 December: Marian Kotleba (73), basketball player (BK Inter Bratislava, Dukla Olomouc, Czechoslovakia national team).
- 13 December: Vladimír Matejička (69), politician, MP (2006–2020).
- 14 December: Jozef Gruska (92), computer scientist and academic.
- 18 December: František Bočko (84), Olympic gymnast (1968).

== See also ==
- 2025 in the European Union
- 2025 in Europe
