= 2024 in Slovakia =

- Decades: 2000s; 2010s; 2020s
- See also: Other events of 2024; History of Slovakia • Years

Events in the year 2024 in Slovakia.

== Incumbents ==
- President: Zuzana Čaputová (until 15 June), Peter Pellegrini (since 15 June)
- Prime Minister: Robert Fico

== Events ==
=== January ===
- 11 January – The Deputy Speaker of the National Council of Slovakia Andrej Danko crashed into a traffic light and fled the scene, avoiding alcohol test for 15 hours.
- 26 January – 26,000 people attended a protest in Bratislava against legal code reforms. Smaller protests were held in other cities.

=== March ===
- 23 March – The 1st round of the 2024 Slovak presidential election is won by Ivan Korčok with 42.51% of the vote. Korčok advances into the second round with the runner-up Peter Pellegrini, who received 37.02% of the vote.
- 28 March – Slovenské elektrárne shuts down operations at its Vojany Power Station, the last coal-fired power plant in the country.

=== April ===
- 6 April – Peter Pellegrini defeats Ivan Korčok in the run-off of the 2024 Slovak presidential election, winning 53,12% of the vote.
- 24 April – The Slovak government approves the Television and Radio Act proposed by prime minister Robert Fico and minister of culture Martina Šimkovičová over alleged partiality of the broadcaster Radio and Television of Slovakia (RTVS). If the bill is supported by the National Council, RTVS will be closed by the following June and replaced by a new broadcaster, named STVR.
- 30 April – The National Council approves in the first reading a legislative amendment introduced by the Slovak National Party requiring non-profit organizations (NGOs) which annually receive more than €5,000 from outside Slovakia to register as "organizations with foreign support".

=== May ===
- 15 May – Attempted assassination of Robert Fico: Prime Minister Robert Fico is critically injured in a shooting in Handlova. A suspect is apprehended and identified as a 71-year-old writer from Levice.

=== June ===
- 8–9 June – 2024 European Parliament election. The liberal Progressive Slovakia party emerges as the largest party in the Slovak contingent to the European Parliament.
- 10 June – A three-hour walkout is held by employees of RTVS in protest over the government's plans to abolish the organisation.
- 15 June – Peter Pellegrini is inaugurated as president of Slovakia.
- 19 June – The European Commission reprimands Belgium, France, Hungary, Italy, Malta, Poland, and Slovakia for breaking budget rules.
- 20 June – The National Council votes in favor of dissolving RTVS and replacing it with the Slovak Television and Radio (STVR).
- 27 June:
  - Seven people are killed and at least five others are injured after a Eurocity train travelling from Prague to Budapest collides with a bus near Nové Zámky.
  - The National Council votes in favor of increased security measures for leading politicians in response to the shooting of Robert Fico, which are denounced by opposition groups and Amnesty International as an infringement on the right to assembly.

=== July ===
- 3 July – The Constitutional Court of Slovakia upholds the abolition of the Special Prosecutor's Office dealing with corruption cases proposed by the Fico government.
- 21 July – A record of over 100,000 people attended an AC/DC concert at the Vajnory Airport.
- 29 July:
  - Matej Beňuš wins bronze in C-1 slalom at the 2024 Summer Olympics, the only medal awarded to Slovak athletes at the Olympics.
  - Deputy Prime Minister Tomáš Taraba announces he will boycott the 2024 Summer Olympics closing ceremony in response to what he calls "progressive political theater" hosted by "drag queens" during the opening ceremony.
- 31 July – Prime Minister Robert Fico threatens to suspend Slovakia's diesel exports to Ukraine if the Ukrainian government continues to suspend pipeline oil transport from Russian oil company Lukoil, which Slovakia claims is causing a national energy crisis.

=== August ===
- 31 August – The martyr Ján Havlík beatified at a ceremony led by the Papal Legate Marcello Semeraro.

=== September ===
- 9 September – The Ukrainian Foreign Ministry expresses "disappointment" regarding assertions made by Prime Minister Robert Fico that Kyiv should remove "fascist elements" from the Armed Forces of Ukraine, using rhetoric similar to Russian allegations of neo-Nazism in Ukraine's Azov Brigade.

=== December ===
- 22 December – Prime Minister Robert Fico holds a surprise meeting with Russian president Vladimir Putin in Moscow.
- 23 December – 2025 Slovak protests: The protests began following Prime Minister Fico's visit to Moscow for a meeting with Russian President Vladimir Putin.

=== Ongoing ===
- 2025 Slovak protests (2024 – present)

== Holidays ==
- 1 January – Day of the Establishment of the Slovak Republic
- 6 January – Epiphany
- 29 March - Good Friday
- 1 April - Easter Monday
- 1 May – Labour Day
- 8 May – Victory in Europe Day
- 5 July – St. Cyril and Methodius Day
- 29 August - Slovak National Uprising Anniversary
- 1 September – Constitution Day
- 15 September – Our Lady of Sorrows Day
- 1 November - All Saints' Day
- 17 November - Freedom and Democracy Day
- 24 December - Christmas Eve
- 25 December - Christmas Day
- 26 December – Saint Stephen's Day

== Art and entertainment ==
- List of Slovak submissions for the Academy Award for Best International Feature Film

== Deaths ==
- 18 January: Marica Mikulová, 72, puppeteer and theatre director.
- 22 January: Gabriela Hanuláková, 66, track and field athlete.
- 25 January: Milan Stanislav Ďurica, 98, historian and theologian.
- 11 February: Ladislav Burlas, 96, composer and musicologist.
- 20 February: Lucia Palugyayová, 46, television presenter.
- 29 February: Eugen Šváb, 89, swing musician.
- 8 March: Ľubomír Stankovský, 72, pop rock musician (Modus).
- 11 April: Anton Flešár, 79, footballer (Dukla Prague, Lokomotíva Košice, Czechoslovakia national team).
- 22 April: Fedor Flašík, 66, political marketer.
- 23 April: Oľga Slivková, 87, journalist and translator.
- 24 April: Oľga Glosíková, 71, politician, MP (1991–1992).
- 18 May: Ivan Mráz, 82, football player (Slovan Bratislava, Czechoslovakia national team) and manager (Alajuelense), Olympic silver medalist (1964).
- 28 May: Róbert Cvi Bornstein, 98, Slovak National Uprising participant and Holocaust survivor.
- 17 June: Milan Urbáni, 79, politician, MP (2002–2010).
- 21 June: Janos Quittner, 82, dancer and choreographer.
- 2 July: Ivan Hričovský, 92, pomologist and celebrity gardener.
- 8 July: Pavol Zelenay, 96, musician, co-founder of Bratislavská lýra.
- 13 July: Blaho Uhlár, 72, theatre director.
- 17 July: Anton Hykisch, 92, writer, politician and diplomat, MP (1990–1992).
- 19 July: Peter Biroš, 74, politician, MP (2002–2006).
- 15 August:
  - Olga Horak, 98, Czechoslovak-born Australian writer and Holocaust survivor.
  - Ľubomír Paulovič, 71, actor (She Grazed Horses on Concrete, It's Better to Be Wealthy and Healthy Than Poor and Ill, The Peacemaker).
- 22 September: Ján Michalko, 76, Olympic cross-country skier (1972, 1976).
- 1 October: Rastislav Trtík, 63, Slovak-born Czech handball player and coach.
- 17 October: George A. Bekey, 96, Czechoslovak-born American roboticist.
- 31 October: Ondrej Húserka, 34, mountaineer.
- 14 November: Pavel Traubner, 83, neurologist.
- 29 November: Eva Mosnáková, 95, human rights activist and Holocaust survivor.
- 7 December: Dana Herrmannová, 93, television presenter.

== See also ==
- 2024 in the European Union
- 2024 in Europe
