= 2026 in Slovakia =

- Decades: 2000s; 2010s; 2020s
- See also: Other events of 2026: History of Slovakia; Years

Events in the year 2026 in Slovakia.

== Incumbents ==
- President: Peter Pellegrini
- Prime Minister: Robert Fico

== Events ==
=== January ===
- 31 January – Miroslav Lajčák resigns as national security adviser to prime minister Fico following the release of documents in the United States revealing his communications with sex offender Jeffrey Epstein.

=== February ===
- 6 February – Two Hungarian climbers are killed in an avalanche at Tupa peak in the High Tatras.
- 18 February – Slovakia suspends exports of diesel fuel to Ukraine, citing attacks on the Druzhba pipeline. Hungary had done the same earlier that same day.
- 21 February – A magnitude 4.1 earthquake hits Trnava Region, damaging several buildings.
- 23 February –
  - Slovakia halts exports of emergency electricity supplies to Ukraine, citing attacks on the Druzhba pipeline.
  - Slovakia joins Hungary in blocking the European Union’s 20th sanctions package against Russia, preventing its adoption ahead of the fourth anniversary of the full-scale invasion of Ukraine. Prime Minister Fico specifically linked his opposition to the suspension of oil transit through the Druzhba pipeline, characterizing the situation as a deliberate provocation by Ukraine.

=== March ===
- 5 March – Ukrainian President Volodymyr Zelenskyy says he would prefer not to repair the Druzhba pipeline.
- 17 March – Hungary and Slovakia sign an agreement to build a 127 km (79 mi)-long oil pipeline running from Százhalombatta to Bratislava.
- 18 March – Slovakia imposes a 30-day restriction on diesel fuel sales and separate pricing for foreign nationals, citing shortages caused by damage to the Druzhba pipeline.

=== April ===
- 16 April – A train travelling from Dunajská Streda to Komárno collides with a truck at a railway crossing, killing one person and injuring 21 others.

=== June ===
- 18 June — The Fico government wins a confidence vote in the National Council triggered by the national debt exceeding limits set out by the constitution.

=== July ===
- 4 July – 2026 Slovak referendum: Proposals to cancel lifetime payments to prime ministers and parliament speakers after leaving office and to reestablish the Special Prosecution Office and the National Criminal Agency fail due to low turnout.

=== August ===
- 6 August – 2026 European heatwaves: The highest recorded temperature in Slovakia is measured in Dolné Plachtince at 42.2 °C (108.0 °F).

=== September ===
- 29 September – Two people are stabbed to death by a 13-year-old student inside a school in Staškov, Žilina Region.

=== October ===
- 24 October –
  - 2026 Slovak local elections, 24 October
  - 2026 Slovak regional elections, 24 October

=== November ===
- 12 November – Slovakia opens its first resident embassy in Manila, 33 years after establishing diplomatic relations with the Philippines.
- 14 November – Slovakia signs the instruments of accession to the Treaty of Amity and Cooperation in Southeast Asia by ASEAN.

=== Predicted and scheduled ===
- September – Smer-SD is reported to make a decision on whether or not to join Patriots for Europe in the EU.
- 3–20 December – 2026 European Women's Handball Championship in Czech Republic, Poland, Romania, Slovakia and Turkey.

== Holidays ==
- 1 January – Day of the Establishment of the Slovak Republic
- 6 January – Epiphany
- 3 April – Good Friday
- 6 April – Easter Monday
- 1 May – Labour Day
- 8 May – Victory in Europe Day
- 5 July – St. Cyril and Methodius Day
- 29 August – Slovak National Uprising Anniversary
- 1 September – Constitution Day
- 15 September – Our Lady of Sorrows Day
- 1 November – All Saints' Day
- 17 November – Freedom and Democracy Day
- 24 December – Christmas Eve
- 25 December – Christmas Day
- 26 December – Saint Stephen's Day

== Art and entertainment ==
- List of Slovak submissions for the Academy Award for Best International Feature Film

== Deaths ==
- 10 January: Oskár Elschek, 94, ethnomusicologist.
- 13 January: Rudolf Urc, 88, director and dramaturg.
- 10 February: Otto Šimko, 101, jurist and Holocaust survivor.
- 14 April: Shlomo Breznitz, 89, Czechoslovak-born Israeli author and politician, MK (2006–2007). (death announced on this date)
- 28 April: Ján Kerekréti, 82, politician, MNC (2020–2023).
- 7 May: Jana Dubovcová, 73, politician, minister of justice (2023) and MNC (2010–2012).
- 17 May: Anton Švajlen, 88, footballer (VSS Košice), Olympic silver medalist (1964).
- 24 May: Ján Plachetka, 81, chess grandmaster.
- 31 May: Tomi Reichental, 90, Slovak-born Irish Holocaust survivor.
- 22 June: Denisa Baránková, 24, Olympic archer (2020, 2024).
- 14 July: Elena Baranová, 80, linguist and philologist.
- 25 July: Ján Barkóci, 67, footballer (Spartak Trnava).
- 12 August: Darina Laščiaková, 94, folk singer and ethnographer.
- 29 August: Jaroslav Olejár, 67, footballer (Sparta Prague, 1. FC Košice).
- 27 September: Juraj Hraško, 95, politician and scientist, minister of environment (1994) and MNC (1992–1994).
- 8 November: Peter Jaroš, 86, writer (The Millennial Bee) and politician, MNC (1992–1994).

== See also ==
- 2026 in the European Union
- 2026 in Europe
