= List of painters from Slovakia =

This is a list of notable painters from, or associated with, Slovakia.

== A ==
- Janko Alexy (1894–1970)
- Jaroslav Augusta (1878–1970)
- Sarah Avni

== B ==
- Zuzana Rabina Bachorikova (born 1961)
- Blažej Baláž (born 1958)
- Mária Balážová (born 1956)
- Miloš Alexander Bazovský (1899–1968)
- Martin Benka (1888–1971)
- Peter Michal Bohúň (1822–1879)
- Albín Brunovský (1935–1997)

== F ==
- Rudolf Fila (1932–2015)
- Ľudovít Fulla (1902–1980)

== G ==
- Mikuláš Galanda (1895–1938)

== J ==
- Július Jakoby (1903–1985)

== K ==
- Jozef Božetech Klemens (1817–1883)

== L ==
- Ľudovít Lehen (1925–2014)
- Anton Lehmden (1929–2018)
- Martin Lukáč (1989–present)

== M ==
- Palo Macho (born 1965)
- Oldrich Majda (1930–2006)
- Cyprián Majerník (1909–1945)

== P ==
- Ivan Pavle (born 1955)
- Julius Podlipny (1898–1991)

== P ==
- Vladimír Popovič (born 1939)

== S ==
- Koloman Sokol (1902–2003)
- Karl Sovanka (1883–1961)
- Tibor Spitz (born 1929)
- Adam Szentpétery (born 1956)

== V ==
- Marko Vrzgula (born 1966)

== Z ==
- Ladislav Záborský (1921–2016)
