= 2026 Staškov school stabbing =

School stabbing in Slovakia

Staškov school stabbing
- Location: 49.4221°N 18.6931°E; Základná škola, Staškov, Žilina, Slovakia
- Date: 29 September 2026
- Target: School staff and pupils
- Attack type: Mass stabbing
- Weapon: Knife
- Deaths: 2
- Injuries: 1
- Perpetrator: Unnamed 13-year-old male (not criminally liable under Slovak law)

On 29 September 2026, a stabbing occurred at an elementary school in the village of Staškov in the Čadca District of Slovakia. An eighth-grade pupil attacked classmates and teachers with a knife during early school hours. A 61-year-old teacher and a 14-year-old female student died as a result of the attack, with another instructor suffering serious injuries. The case is being investigated by the Office for Combating Organized Crime as a particularly serious case of premeditated murder. Because the perpetrator is 13 years old, he is not criminally liable under Slovak law.

== Background ==
The attack follows a series of similar violent incidents in Slovak schools. In 2025, an 18-year-old student fatally stabbed two people at a high school in northern Slovakia. In 2020, a former student attacked a high school in the town of Vrútky, killing the deputy principal and injuring five people. In 2022, a high school student attacked and injured a student at a high school in Nováky.

The elementary school had been addressing "problematic behavior" in the impacted classroom for several days prior. A small incident was recorded by school management the previous Friday, resulting in Centre for Counselling and Prevention psychologists holding a session with the entire class on Monday, one day prior to the stabbing.

The principal had communicated with the attacker's legal representatives on the morning of the attack.

== Stabbing ==
The stabbing took place on the morning of Tuesday, 29 September 2026, shortly after the end of the first lesson. An eighth-grade pupil of the school attacked two teachers and a classmate with a knife. According to available information, the school's security cameras were not operating at the time of the attack due to a planned power outage.

All available emergency services were dispatched to the scene, including two ambulances and two rescue helicopters; paramedics attempted to resuscitate one of the injured teachers at the scene, but her injuries ultimately proved fatal. The seriously injured female student was airlifted by helicopter to Martin University Hospital, where she remained in critical condition. The perpetrator was apprehended by police directly at the scene. The Žilina Regional Police Directorate confirmed that it was investigating the case as a violent crime and stated that there was no longer any immediate danger present.

== Victims ==
61-year-old second-grade teacher Božena Mariaková died from injuries sustained during the attack. An injured 14-year-old female student was airlifted by helicopter, in critical condition, to Martin University Hospital. Health Minister Kamil Šaško stated that the student's condition was very serious and that she had developed hemorrhagic shock due to massive bleeding. Despite doctors' best efforts, the female pupil ultimately succumbed to her injuries on 1 October 2026; the Speaker of the National Council and the Minister of the Interior both publicly expressed condolences, referring to the student victim by her first name, Nelka (Nellka). A second teacher, aged 44, was also injured and hospitalized with a stab wound to the chest.

Both victims were buried with state honors. Teacher Božena Mariaková was buried on 6 October 2026 in Staškov, with several hundred people attending the funeral. The female student, Nelka, was buried on 7 October 2026 in Olešná. An honor guard presented a wreath from the President of Slovakia and placed it on her coffin.

== Perpetrator ==
Responsibility for the attack lies with a 13-year-old, eighth-grade male pupil who was attending the school. As he is a child younger than 14, under the Slovak Criminal Code, the attacker is not criminally liable. Nevertheless, the case is being investigated by the Office for Combating Organized Crime as a particularly serious case of premeditated murder. The perpetrator's identity has not been officially disclosed due to his age. Interior Minister Matúš Šutaj Eštok later confirmed that the boy had been placed in an appropriate psychological detention facility. According to Interez.sk, problems with the pupil had already been dealt with at the school in the days before the attack. On Friday, 25 September, issues were addressed at the school, although they were not considered serious. On Monday, 28 September, Centre for Counselling and Prevention psychologists worked with the impacted class. Some media outlets published unverified information about a possible motive for the attack and the perpetrator's identity. Education Minister Tomáš Drucker explicitly asked the public not to spread unverified information and to respect the privacy of the affected children and families.

== Investigation into police conduct ==
In early October 2026, the Inspection Service Office (ÚIS) began a criminal prosecution for abuse of power by a public official in connection with the police's handling of events before the attack. ÚIS spokeswoman Andrea Dobiášová confirmed that the investigation concerns how police handled a criminal complaint the school had filed approximately five days before the attack regarding an earlier incident; no specific person has been charged. Dobiášová stated that the preliminary proceedings are non-public and that the investigation is intensively ongoing.

== Aftermath ==
In the days after the attack, police recorded a significant increase in the number of reported incidents from schools across Slovakia, from 5 cases on Monday, 28 September, to 18 cases on Wednesday, 30 September, and 17 cases on Thursday, totaling approximately 65 reported cases over five day-period, most of them verbal or physical altercations, mainly occurring at elementary schools. Around 68% of suspects were younger than 15, and roughly a fifth were minors. Police classified 24 cases as criminal offenses and 22 as misdemeanors. According to police spokesman Stanislav Hromádka, schools are now reporting behavior that they had previously only dealt with internally.

According to criminological analyses comparing violent incidents at schools in Slovakia and the Czech Republic since 2004 (including cases in Svitavy, Žďár nad Sázavou, Vrútky, Prague-Michle, Spišská Stará Ves, and Staškov), most victims are adult school staff defending pupils (5 of 7 victims over 22 years), while perpetrators are almost exclusively current or former pupils rather than outside intruders. The analyses note that mechanical barriers and turnstiles cannot prevent attacks originating from within the school community, and point to an approximately thirteen-day window of heightened risk of imitation (the so-called Columbine effect, a copycat phenomenon) following intensive media coverage.

== Reactions ==
Interior Minister Matúš Šutaj Eštok and Education Minister Tomáš Drucker personally traveled to the scene. Šutaj Eštok described violence in schools as absolutely unacceptable. Prime Minister Robert Fico stated that schools must be a safe place for children. Drucker expressed condolences to the victim's family and the school, and confirmed that the ministry had provided immediate professional and psychological assistance to the school community, while requesting for the media to not spread unverified information and to respect the families' privacy. Prosecutor General Maroš Žilinka described the attack as a serious warning against escalating tension in society. President Peter Pellegrini expressed condolences to the victim's family and called on society to focus on calm, respect, and mutual consideration. Following the news of the female student's death, the Speaker of the National Council and the Minister of the Interior expressed condolences, with the latter stating that the news had deeply affected him.

The chairman of Progressive Slovakia, Michal Šimečka, condemned the violence and noted that it was not the first such incident at a Slovak school, which he claimed signaled a broader social problem. SaS chairman Branislav Gröhling emphasized that schools must be a safe space and that society must not accept violence as a way of solving problems. KDH chairman Milan Majerský expressed deep condolences to the deceased teacher's family and called for support for witnesses and the injured. Democrats chairman Jaroslav Naď called for convening the Security Council of the Slovak Republic and demanded state authorities draw up a concrete plan of measures to prevent similar tragedies. The Slovakia Movement demanded transparent communication from the authorities about whether the perpetrator's previous behavior had been reported and addressed.

Security expert Andrej Veľas at the University of Žilina stated that the incident highlighted the need to build a comprehensive safety culture in schools, which includes physical security measures in addition to procedures for identifying warning signs, as well as cooperation between school management, teaching and specialist staff, and the police. He acknowledged that no methodology can completely eliminate the risk of violence, but that it can contribute to the early identification of risk factors and mitigation of their consequences.
