= Kubecka =

Kubecka or Kubečka is a surname. Notable people with the surname include:

- Chris Kubecka, American computer security researcher and cyberwarfare specialist
- Jaroslav Kubečka (1934–2025), Slovak politician
- Robert Kubecka, American undercover informant murdered by mob related to Salvatore Avellino

== See also ==
- Kubeck
