= Baďura =

Baďura (feminine: Baďurová) is a Czech and Slovak surname. Badura is a Polish-language surname, derived from the nickname bajdura, badura, 'a talkative person' or 'a person who likes to talk a lot'. Badura is also a Germanised form of Baďura. Notable people with the surname include:

== Baďura ==
- Jerguš Baďura (born 1991), Slovak-Norwegian slalom canoeist
- Kateřina Baďurová (born 1982), Czech pole vaulter
- Ľudovít Baďura (1951–2006), Slovak footballer

== Badura ==
- Jan Badura (1907–1975), Polish footballer

== See also ==
- Eva Badura-Skoda (1929–2021), Austrian musicologist
- Paul Badura-Skoda (1927–2019), Austrian pianist
- Badura Afganli (1912–2002), Azerbaijani actress
- Badura
