= 2027 in Slovakia =

- Decades: 2000s; 2010s; 2020s
- See also: Other events of 2027; History of Slovakia • Years

Events in the year 2027 in Slovakia.

== Events ==
=== Predicted and scheduled ===
- 2 August – Solar eclipse of August 2, 2027 (partial eclipse)
- By 27 September – Next Slovak parliamentary election

== Holidays ==
- 1 January – Day of the Establishment of the Slovak Republic
- 6 January – Epiphany
- 26 March – Good Friday
- 29 March – Easter Monday
- 1 May – Labour Day
- 8 May – Victory in Europe Day
- 5 July – St. Cyril and Methodius Day
- 29 August – Slovak National Uprising Anniversary
- 1 September – Constitution Day
- 15 September – Our Lady of Sorrows Day
- 1 November – All Saints' Day
- 17 November – Freedom and Democracy Day
- 24 December – Christmas Eve
- 25 December – Christmas Day
- 26 December – Saint Stephen's Day
