= Albín =

Albín may refer to:

== Given name ==
- Albín Brunovský (1935–1997), Slovak painter and graphic artist
- Albín Polášek (1879–1965), American sculptor and educator

== Surname ==
- Emiliano Albín (born 1989), Uruguayan professional footballer
- Juan Ángel Albín (born 1986) Uruguayan professional footballer
- Tomás Gomensoro Albín (1810–1900),Uruguayan political figure
