= Ruttkay =

Ruttkay is a surname. Notable people with the surname include:

- Alexander Ruttkay (1941–2025), Hungarian archaeologist and historian
- Elisabeth Ruttkay (1926–2009), Hungarian-born Austrian archaeologist
- Iván Ruttkay (1926–2013), Hungarian speed skater
