= Quittner =

Quittner is a surname. Notable people with the surname include:

- Janos Quittner (1941–2024), Slovak dancer, choreographer, and director
- Josh Quittner (born 1957), American journalist
- Zsigmond Quittner (1859–1918), Hungarian architect
