= Gruska =

Gruska is a surname. Notable people with the surname include:

- Jay Gruska (born 1952), American songwriter and composer
- Jozef Gruska (1933–2025), Slovak computer scientist and academic
