= Zelenay =

Zelenay is a surname. Notable people with the surname include:

- Igor Zelenay (born 1982), Slovak tennis player
- Pavol Zelenay (1928–2024), Slovak swing composer, producer, musician, and music critic
