= Alexander Vika =

Slovak sculptor (1933–2025)

- Born: 10 May 1933; Bratislava, Czechoslovakia
- Died: 21 April 2025 (aged 91); Bratislava, Slovakia

Alexander Vika (10 May 1933 – 21 April 2025) was a Slovak sculptor and academic. He was known for introducing abstract, modernist approaches to monumental communist-era Czechoslovak sculpture.

== Life and career ==
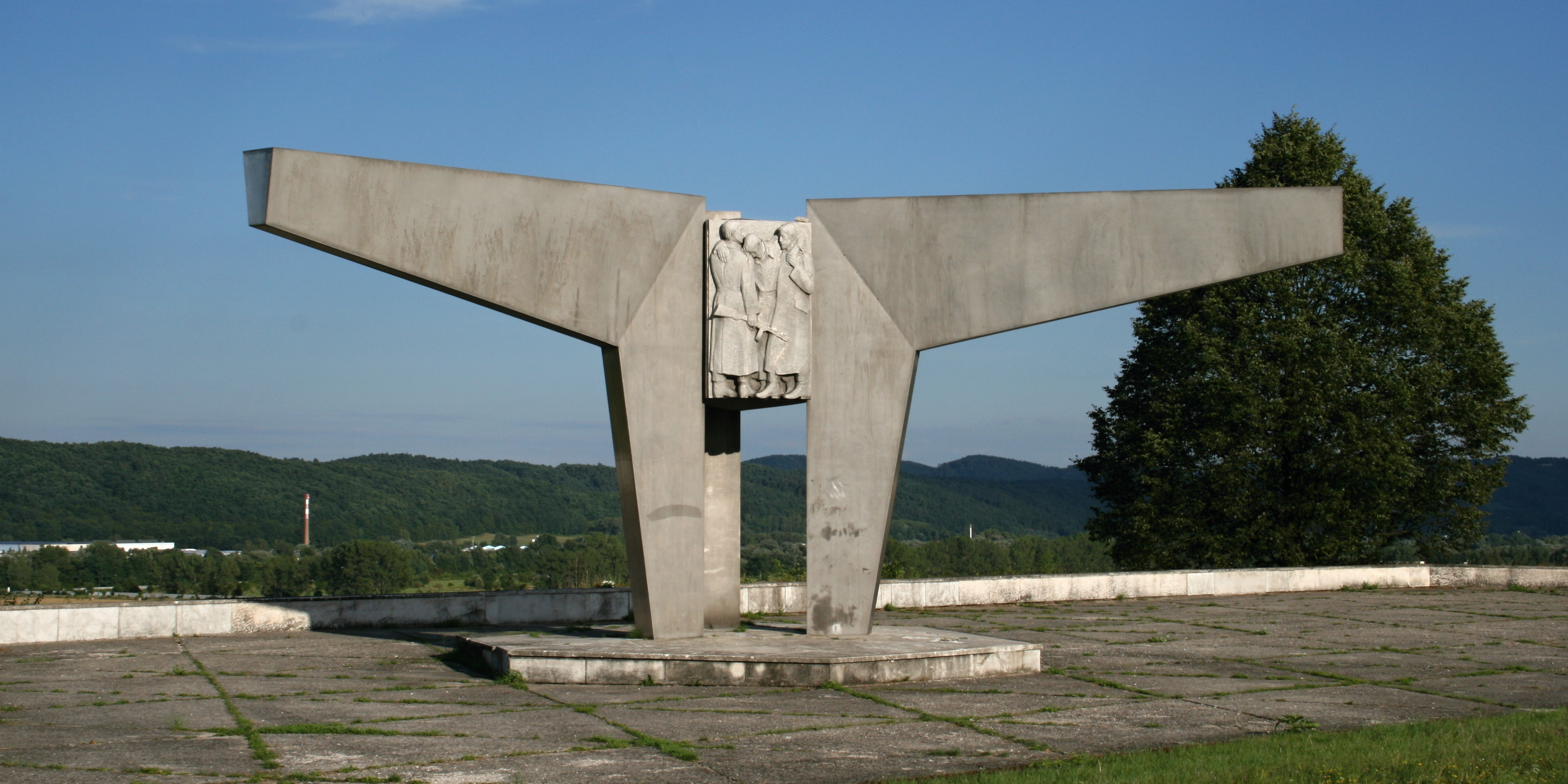
Memorial of the 2nd Czechoslovak parachute brigade in Badín

Alexander Vika was born on 10 May 1933 in Bratislava. His childhood was strongly influenced by World War II. When he was 11 years old, his family moved to the countryside to escape the intensifying bombardment of Bratislava by Allied forces.

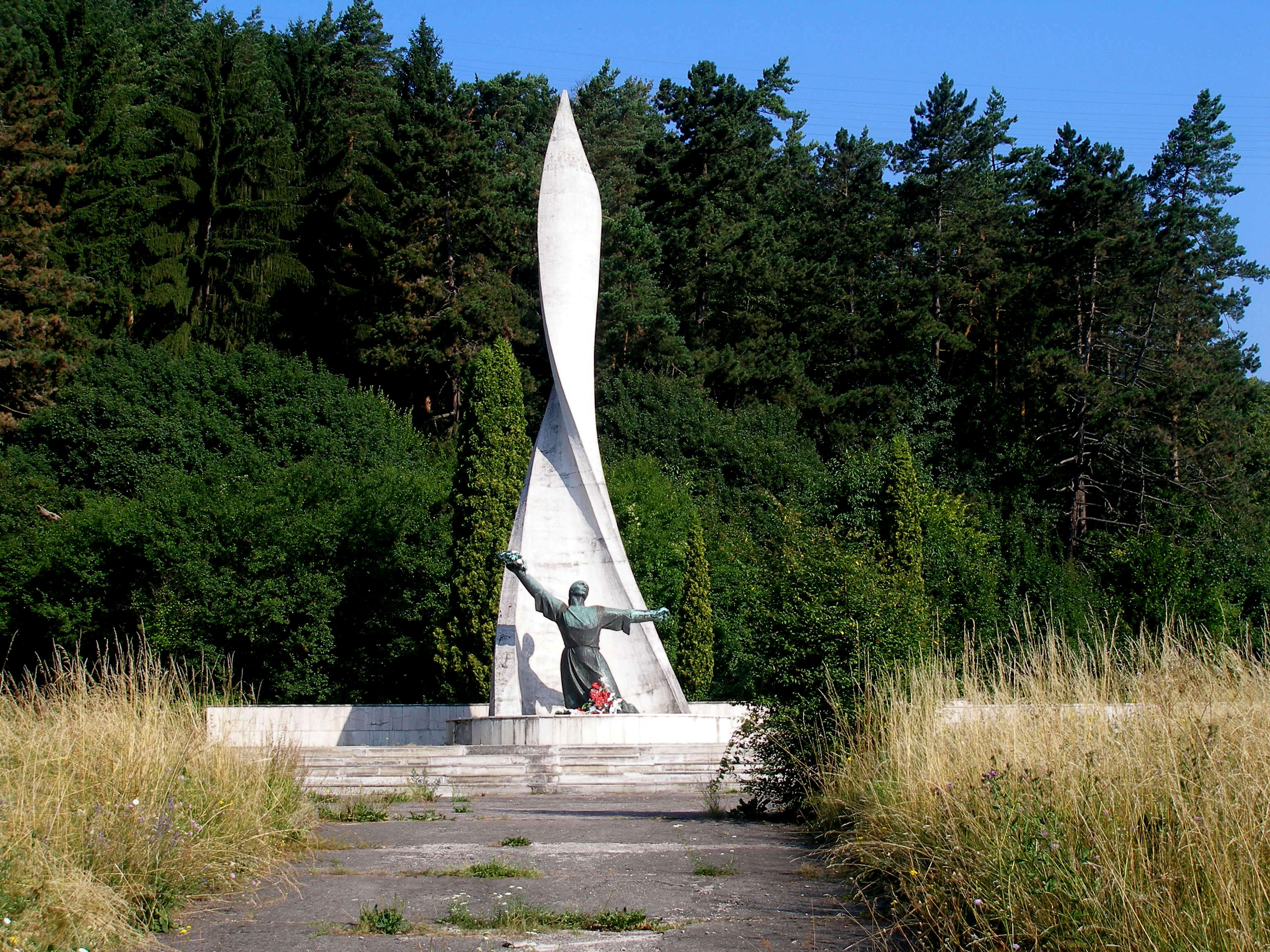
Flame memorial in Nemecká

Vika trained at the arts academy in Bratislava and studied sculpture at the Academy of Fine Arts and Design, graduating in 1959. In the 1960s and 1970s, he created monumental statues, including the memorial of the 2nd Czechoslovak parachute brigade in Badín, the "Flame" memorial in Nemecká and the "Three ears of grain" memorial in Nitra. The Flame memorial is the highest, measuring 12.5 meters in height. In addition, Vika created a large number of memorials and plaques, located mostly in Bratislava, including the "Youth" statue located in front of the Junior hotel in Bratislava.

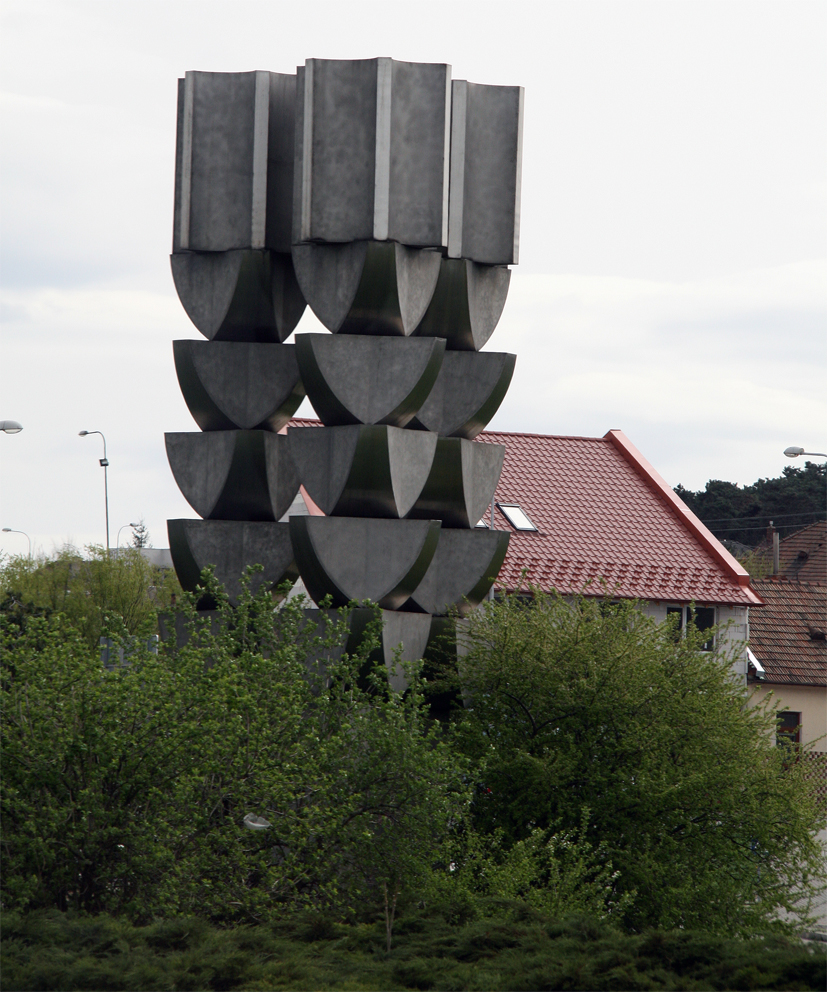
Three grain ears memorial in Nitra

In addition to his artistic production, Vika taught at the Comenius University (1965–1985), the Slovak University of Technology in Bratislava (1986–2002), and since 2002 at the Alexander Dubček University, which awarded him an honorary doctorate in 2001.

Vika died in Bratislava on 21 April 2025, at the age of 91.
