= Marko Vrzgula =

Slovak painter

- Born: 24 February 1966 (age 60); Košice, Czechoslovakia
- Known for: painting, gallery work
- Website: Official website

Marko Vrzgula (born 24 February 1966) is a Slovak painter and organiser of exhibitions and symposiums for painters.

He is one of the founding members of the association The Blue Pears [Modré Hrušky] (1988).

Vrzgula is the author of the concept of the gallery GUBA (2004) as well as its manager. GUBA comprises nine individual venues altogether – amounting to approximately 2 400 m² of exhibition area. GUBA is an authentic space of contemporary architecture where the exhibited artworks communicate with people and the environment in their everyday reality. More than 50 Slovak and Czech artists have held long-term exhibitions of their works here.

Since 2004 Vrzgula is a freelance artist. He lives and works in Bratislava and in the village of Lúčky near Ružomberok, in the Liptov region.

== Studies and pedagogical career ==
Vrzgula was born in Košice. He studied at the Department of Painting of the Academy of Fine Arts and Design in Bratislava from 1985 to 1991. Between the years 1992 and 2002 Vrzgula was a pedagogue at the Department of Painting at the Academy of Fine Arts and Design in Bratislava (Introduction to painting and drawing for 1st–5th year students).

From 2002 until 2004 he taught at the Department of Creative Arts and Art Education at the Constantine the Philosopher University in Nitra.

== Exhibitions ==
Since the year 1988 Vrzgula has presented his work at more than twenty solo exhibitions in Slovakia (Bratislava, Martin, Poprad, Spišská Nová Ves, Košice, Žilina, Dolný Kubín, Zvolen, Senica), but also abroad, in the French Hégenheim and in Herzliya (Israel). He also participated at more than fifty collective exhibitions, among them also exhibitions in Vienna, St. Pölten and in Horn (Austria), in Warsaw and in Poznan (Poland), in Munich and Bruckmühl (Germany), in Novi Sad (the former Yugoslavia), in Washington (USA), in Sofia (Bulgaria), in Cagnes-sur-Mer (France), in London (Great Britain), in the Czech Republic and in Slovakia.

Vrzgula also participated at an international symposium in the Austrian town of Horn, at a symposium of large format paintings in Dolný Kubín (2 times), at a painters’ symposium in Moravany nad Váhom, at the program Artists-in-Residence – Jelení Studio in Prague, at the plein air painting in Malá Franková (2 times). Since the year 2010 Vrzgula has been organising the symposium Lúčky (4 times).

== Painting artwork ==
Vrzgula’s work uses range of contents and forms to react to everyday life impulses. He uses a variety of ways to apply paint, such as with a roller, frottage, dripping, spatula usage and haptic inputs.

He works in longer cycles that go on for a number years. He abstracted the figure in his thesis Windows (Okná, 1990–1991). A rotating foam cylinder defined the stripe compositions of the years long cycle Intersections (Prieniky, 1993–2000). He used a similar artistic approach of the repetition of horizontal lines also in his subsequent cycle Bridges (Mosty, 2004–2011) – where he achieved a staccato style grid from imprints of real wooden boards and pieces on the painting. Another one of Vrzgula’s cycle is Movements and Spirals (Pohyby a Špirály, 2006–2012), where we see the coloured pastes become more and more dominant and thus create a pre-step for the latest years-long cycle of Vrzgula called Pulsars (Pulzary, 2011–2015).

Vrzgula is continuously working on his own recipe for acrylic that is able to carry an extreme amount of colored paste. This allows him to create haptic reliefs full of colored messages. Vrzgula models them with his fingers so they can be perceived through the touch of one’s hands. This is how Vrzgula can physically take part in the creation of the composition without using any tools. Before every one of his compositions, Vrzgula creates a sketch which on its own is very interesting and of a high artistic quality. It could well be presented as an artwork itself. In Vrzgula’s latest works these sketches are starting to see a change since they are now sketched on large canvases while before they had been drawn on small paper surfaces.
