= Zohor =

- Municipality
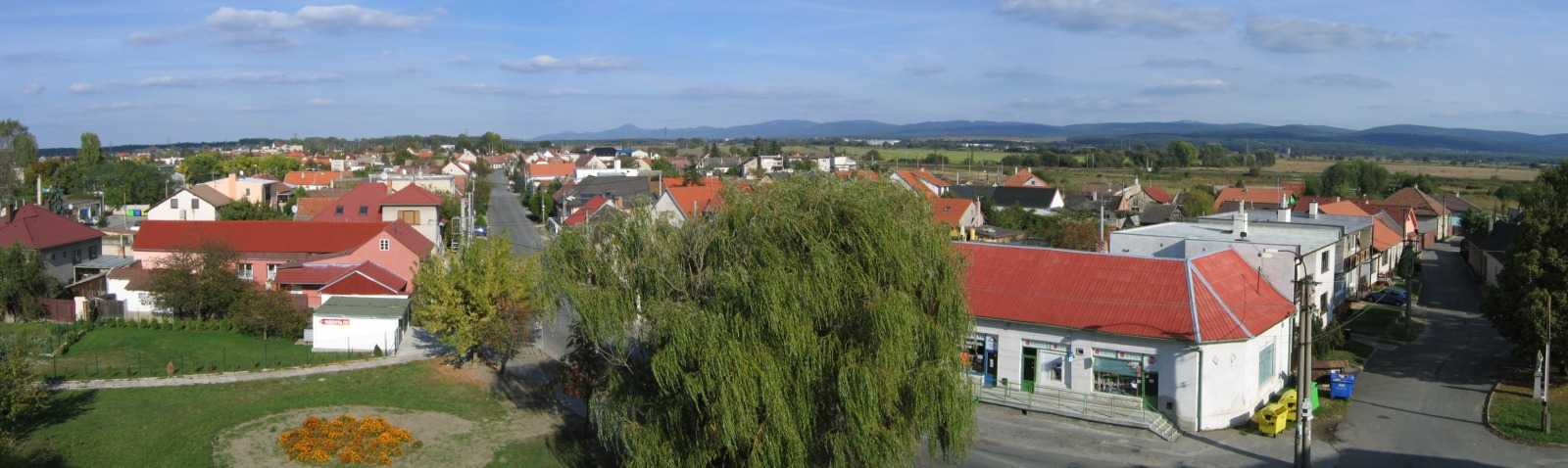
- View on north-eastern part of the village

- Flag

- Location of Zohor in the Bratislava Region Location of Zohor in Slovakia
- Coordinates: 48.33°N 16.99°E
- Country: Slovakia
- Region: Bratislava Region
- District: Malacky District
- First mentioned: 1314

Area
  - Total: 21.12 km^{2} (8.15 sq mi)
- Elevation: 146 m (479 ft)

Population (2025)
  - Total: 3,846
- Time zone: UTC+1 (CET)
  - Summer (DST): UTC+2 (CEST)
- Postal code: 900 51
- Area code: +421 2
- Vehicle registration plate (until 2022): MA
- Website: www.obeczohor.sk

Zohor is a village and municipality in western Slovakia in Malacky District in the Bratislava Region.

== Geography ==
The municipality lies at an altitude of 146 metres (479 ft) and covers an area of 21.12 km^{2} (8.15 sq mi) (2025).

== History ==
The village was first mentioned in 1314 as Sahur.

== Population ==
Population statistic (10 years)
Year	1995	2005	2015	2025
Count	2985	3241	3302	3846
Difference		+8.57%	+1.88%	+16.47%

Population statistic
Year	2024	2025
Count	3774	3846
Difference		+1.90%

It has a population of 3846 people (31 December 2025).

=== Ethnicity ===
Census 2021 (1+ %)
Ethnicity	Number	Fraction
Slovak	3169	91.9%
Not found out	242	7.01%
Total	3448	

In year 2021 was 3448 people by ethnicity 3169 as Slovak, 242 as Not found out, 29 as Czech, 28 as Romani, 10 as Hungarian, 10 as Other, 8 as Ukrainian, 7 as Rusyn, 7 as German, 4 as Russian, 3 as Polish, 2 as Italian, 2 as Serbian, 2 as Moravian, 2 as Albanian, 1 as Silesian, 1 as Austrian, 1 as French and 1 as Croatian.

Note on population: The difference values of population numbers in the table "Population statistic" and in the sections "Ethnicity" & "Religion" is caused by the use of various statistical methods.

=== Religion ===
Census 2021 (1+ %)
Religion	Number	Fraction
Roman Catholic Church	2275	65.98%
None	805	23.35%
Not found out	249	7.22%
Evangelical Church	36	1.04%
Total	3448	

In year 2021 was 3448 people by religion 2275 from Roman Catholic Church, 805 from None, 249 from Not found out, 36 from Evangelical Church, 20 from Greek Catholic Church, 12 from Ad hoc movements, 10 from Eastern Orthodox Church, 8 from Christian Congregations in Slovakia, 6 from Other and not ascertained christian church, 5 from Jehovah's Witnesses, 4 from Paganism and natural spirituality, 4 from Islam, 4 from Buddhism, 3 from Calvinist Church, 3 from Other, 2 from Church of the Brethren, 1 from United Methodist Church and 1 from Church of Jesus Christ of Latter-day Saints.

== Sport ==
FC Zohor are a football team that play at the Štadión FC Zohor on Požiarnická 395/6. The site previously held motorcycle speedway and was chosen to host a final round of the Czechoslovak Individual Speedway Championship from 1977 to 1980.

== Famous people ==
- Vanessa Aleksander, Polish actress, maternal grandparents live in Zohor
- Albín Brunovský (1935–2007), Slovak painter, born in Zohor
- Pavol Zelenay (1928–2024), Slovak musician, born in Zohor
