= Milan Dobeš =

Czech graphical artist (1929–2025)

- Born: 29 July 1929; Přerov, Czechoslovakia
- Died: 17 October 2025 (aged 96); Bratislava, Slovakia
- Education: Academy of Fine Arts and Design

Milan Dobeš (29 July 1929 – 17 October 2025) was a Czech graphical artist, internationally recognised as one of the pioneers of kinetic art.

== Life and career ==
Milan Dobeš was born in Přerov on 29 July 1929. His father owned a textile factory in Český Těšín. Dobeš was expected to take over family business, which is why he was educated at the Business Academy in Český Těšín. Nonetheless, the factory was nationalized after the 1948 Communist coup d'état in Czechoslovakia.

Without any realistic chance to continue his family legacy, Dobeš turned to art. Nonetheless, he was unable to study due to his "bourgeois origin". For several years, he supported himself working as a tap dancer in Gustav Brom's orchestra and later as an illustrator for the magazine Stavbár.

In 1951, Dobeš enrolled in painting studies at the Academy of Fine Arts and Design in Bratislava. There he studied under Bedřich Hoffstädter and Dezider Milly in the tradition of realist landscape painting. In spite of being personally inclined to more progressive art styles, Dobeš excelled in his studies and by the time of his graduation in 1956, he was recognized as the best of this class. During his studies, he spent some time in France.

After graduation, he remained in Bratislava until shortly before his death. In spite of being trained as a painter, Dobeš became one of the pioneers of kinetic and optical art.

=== Art ===
In the late 1950s, Dobeš developed an approach he later termed dynamic constructivism (1988), based on the synthesis of form, light, and motion. His work was part of the broader New Sensibility movement, which responded to technological progress and scientific achievements after World War II.

Around 1961–1963, Dobeš began creating kinetic objects and mobiles, such as Pulsating Rhythm I and Constructivist Composition, first exhibited in Bratislava (1965) and Prague (1966). His work quickly gained international acclaim. The art historian Frank Popper included works by Dobeš in the exhibitions KunstLichtKunst (Eindhoven, 1966) and Cinétisme. Spectacle. Environnement (Grenoble, 1968), and in Popper's book Origins and Development of Kinetic Art (London, 1968). Udo Kultermann featured him in The New Sculpture: Environments and Assemblages (1968). Dobeš also exhibited at Documenta 4 in Kassel (1968) and later in Dynamo: Un siècle de lumière et de mouvement dans l'art 1913–2013 at the Grand Palais, Paris (2013). In 1970 he toured the United States with the American Wind Symphony Orchestra.

Following the Warsaw Pact invasion of Czechoslovakia, Dobeš's art faced political headwinds. His art was deemed “bourgeois” by the communist regime; he was expelled from the Union of Slovak Fine Artists. Until 1989, he worked as an independent artist. Following the collapse of the communist regime in Czechoslovakia due to Velvet Revolution, his art was restored to mainstream prominence. A Milan Dobeš Museum was opened in Bratislava in 2001.

In 2016, Milan Dobeš moved to Ostrava, where he also relocated his museum the following year.

=== Death ===
Dobeš died in Bratislava on 17 October 2025, at the age of 96.
