= Ľudovít Baďura =

Slovak footballer (1951–2006)

Personal information
- Date of birth: 12 December 1951
- Place of birth: Staškov, Czechoslovakia
- Date of death: October 31, 2006 (aged 54)
- Place of death: Trenčín, Slovakia
- Position: Striker

Youth career
- Kysucké Nové Mesto

Senior career*
Years	Team	Apps	(Gls)
1973–1974	Kysucké Nové Mesto		
1974–1981	Spartak Trnava	166	(19)
1981–1982	FK Dubnica nad Váhom	25	(8)
- * Club domestic league appearances and goals

Ľudovít Baďura (12 December 1951– 31 October 2006) was a Slovak football striker most known for playing with Spartak Trnava. After his retirement from professional football, he worked as a coach. He died in 2006, at the age of 54 in Trenčín.

== Club career ==
=== Spartak Trnava ===
In the summer of 1974, Baďura transferred to Czechoslovak first league side, Spartak Trnava, joining from Kysucký Nové Mesto after being the top scorer in the second division. He made his league debut in a 2–0 loss against Sklo Union Teplice in the first round of the 1974–75 season. He scored his first goal for Spartak Trnava in his 25th league start in the 30th round in against Slavia Prague, scoring the winning goal of a 2–1 win. In the next season, Baďura scored his first hat-trick in a 5–0 win against Lokomotiva Košice. He helped the club become the winner of the 1974–75 Slovak Cup, beating AC Nitra in the final, before subsequently beating Sparta Prague to win the same season's Czechoslovak Cup. Baďura also featured in two Cup Winners' Cup matches against the Portuguese team Boavista Porto, which his team lost 3–0 on aggregate.

He played for Spartak Trnava until the end of the 1980/1981 season. In 7 seasons, he played in 166 league matches, scoring 19 goals.

== Post-playing career ==
After the end of his active career, he worked as a coach of Spartak Dubnica, extra-league futsal club ŠK Makroteam Žilina and ŠK Program Dubnica nad Váhom. He also led Slovakia's collegiate team in futsal at the Academic World Championship in Finland. Baďura died on 31 October 2006, in Trenčín.
