= Kamienka, Humenné District =

Municipality of Slovakia

Kamienka
- Municipality
- Flag

- Location of Kamienka in the Prešov Region Location of Kamienka in Slovakia
- Coordinates: 48.91°N 22.00°E
- Country: Slovakia
- Region: Prešov Region
- District: Humenné District
- First mentioned: 1451

Area
  - Total: 5.39 km^{2} (2.08 sq mi)
- Elevation: 230 m (750 ft)

Population (2025)
  - Total: 538
- Time zone: UTC+1 (CET)
  - Summer (DST): UTC+2 (CEST)
- Postal code: 678 3
- Area code: +421 57
- Vehicle registration plate (until 2022): HE
- Website: www.kamienka.sk

Kamienka is a village and municipality in Humenné District in the Prešov Region of north-east Slovakia.

== History ==
In historical records the village was first mentioned in 1451.

== Geography ==
The municipality lies at an altitude of 230 metres (750 ft) and covers an area of 5.39 km^{2} (2.08 sq mi) (2025).

== Population ==
Population statistic (10 years)
Year	1995	2005	2015	2025
Count	516	575	531	538
Difference		+11.43%	−7.65%	+1.31%

Population statistic
Year	2024	2025
Count	533	538
Difference		+0.93%

It has a population of 538 people (31 December 2025).

=== Ethnicity ===
Census 2021 (1+ %)
Ethnicity	Number	Fraction
Slovak	512	97.33%
Rusyn	19	3.61%
Not found out	11	2.09%
Total	526	

In year 2021 was 526 people by ethnicity 512 as Slovak, 19 as Rusyn, 11 as Not found out, 5 as Romani, 1 as Russian and 1 as Other.

Note on population: The difference values of population numbers in the table "Population statistic" and in the sections "Ethnicity" & "Religion" is caused by the use of various statistical methods.

=== Religion ===
Census 2021 (1+ %)
Religion	Number	Fraction
Roman Catholic Church	410	77.95%
None	55	10.46%
Greek Catholic Church	37	7.03%
Not found out	9	1.71%
Eastern Orthodox Church	6	1.14%
Total	526	

In year 2021 was 526 people by religion 410 from Roman Catholic Church, 55 from None, 37 from Greek Catholic Church, 9 from Not found out, 6 from Eastern Orthodox Church, 5 from Church of Jesus Christ of Latter-day Saints, 2 from Hinduism, 1 from Islam and 1 from Evangelical Church.

== Genealogical resources ==
The records for genealogical research are available at the state archive "Statny Archiv in Presov, Slovakia"

- Roman Catholic church records (births/marriages/deaths): 1802-1954 (parish B)

== Notable people ==
- Oľga Glosíková (1953–2024), politician

== See also ==
- List of municipalities and towns in Slovakia
