= Ján Barkóci =

Slovak footballer (1958–2026)

Personal information
- Date of birth: 17 September 1958
- Place of birth: Czechoslovakia
- Date of death: 25 July 2026 (aged 67)
- Position: Forward

Senior career*
Years	Team	Apps	(Gls)
1979–1983	Spartak Trnava	50	(4)
1983–?	FK Senica		
- * Club domestic league appearances and goals

Ján Barkóci (17 September 1958 – 25 July 2026) was a Slovak professional footballer who played as a forward for Spartak Trnava in the Czechoslovak First League.

== Career ==
Ján Barkóci was born in Czechoslovakia on 17 September 1958. He began his career when he joined Spartak Trnava during the 1977–78 season as a forward. He made over 50 appearances and scored four goals for the club in the Czechoslovak First League between 1979 and 1983. Then, he played for FK Senica.

== Death ==
Barkóci died on 25 July 2026, at the age of 67.
