= Rostislav Prokop =

Slovak footballer (1966–2025)

Personal information
- Date of birth: 16 September 1966
- Place of birth: Czechoslovakia
- Date of death: July 2025 (aged 58)
- Place of death: Slovakia
- Position: Defender

Senior career*
Years	Team	Apps	(Gls)
1988–1989	VTJ Tábor	8	(0)
1989–1993	Dunajská Streda	80	(4)
1993–1994	Petra Drnovice	11	(2)
1995–1996	Dunajská Streda	8	(2)
1997–1998	Athinaikos	22	(2)
1998–1999	DAC Dunajská Streda	10	(0)
- * Club domestic league appearances and goals

Rostislav Prokop (16 September 1966 – July 2025) was a Slovak footballer who played as a defender.

In 1993, he received a two-year ban for doping.

== Career ==
Prokop played for VTJ Tábor, DAC Dunajská Streda, Petra Drnovice and Greek Athinaikos. In the Czech and Czechoslovak leagues he played in 91 games and scored 6 goals, in the Slovak league he played in 8 games and scored 2 goals.

== Death ==
Prokop died in July 2025, at the age of 58.
