= Ľudmila Gajdošíková =

Slovak judge (1953–2025)

Judge of the Constitutional Court of Slovakia
- In office 22 January 2000 – 16 February 2019

Member of the House of the Nations
- In office 6 June 1992 – 31 December 1992

Personal details
- Born: 17 October 1953 Bratislava, Czechoslovakia
- Died: 7 October 2025 (aged 71)
- Political party: SDĽ
- Education: Comenius University
- Occupation: Judge

Ľudmila Gajdošíková (17 October 1953 – 7 October 2025) was a Slovak judge. A member of the Party of the Democratic Left, she served in the House of the Nations from June to December 1992 and was a judge of the Constitutional Court from 2000 to 2019.

Gajdošíková died on 7 October 2025, at the age of 71.
