= Oľga Glosíková =

Slovak politician (1953–2024)

Member of the Chamber of Nations of the Federal Assembly of the Czech and Slovak Federative Republic
- In office 1991–1992

Personal details
- Born: 24 March 1953 Kamienka, Czechoslovakia
- Died: 24 April 2024 (aged 71)
- Party: Party of the Democratic Left (since 1991)
- Other political affiliations: Communist Party of Czechoslovakia (until 1991)
- Education: National Academy of Sciences of Belarus; Pavol Jozef Šafárik University

Oľga Glosíková (24 March 1953 – 24 April 2024) was a Slovak politician. From 1991 to 1992, she served as a Deputy of the Federal Assembly of the Czech and Slovak Federative Republic.

== Biography ==
Oľga Glosíková was born on 24 March 1953 in the village of Kamienka in the Humenné District to a Ruthenian family. She studied philosophy and history at the Pavol Jozef Šafárik University. After graduation she worked as a high school teacher in Svit and later as an assistant professor at the University of Prešov.

In the 1990 Czechoslovak parliamentary election, Glosíková ran in the East Slovakia election district on the list of the Communist Party of Slovakia, which was at the time still affiliated with the Communist Party of Czechoslovakia. She did not win her mandate outright but became a deputy as a replacement in 1991, when the Slovak part of communist party already split from the Czechoslovak party and rebranded itself as the Party of the Democratic Left, which she represented in the parliament.

After the end of her parliamentary mandate, Glosíková returned to the academia. In 2005 she was awarded a doctorate by the National Academy of Sciences of Belarus. In 2007, she became the founding director of a museum of the Ruthenian culture in Prešov.

=== Death ===
Glosíková died on 24 April 2024 at the age of 71.
