= Zora Palová =

Slovak glass artist (1947–2025)

Zora Palová (22 December 1947 – 11 January 2025) was a Slovak glass artist.

== Biography ==
Palová was born in Bratislava, Slovakia on 22 December 1947, and attended the applied arts school there. She later became a teacher at the public art school in Nitra, and worked as a designer, before returning to her hometown and resuming studies in art. She initially studied painting and sculpture, but changed her major to study architecture and glass.

From 1996 to 2003 she was head of the glass department at the University of Sunderland in England. In 2008, she received the Rakow Commission from Corning Museum of Glass, New York.

Palová died on 11 January 2025, at the age of 77.
