= 2020 Vrútky school stabbing =

Mass stabbing in Vrútky, Slovakia

Vrútky school stabbing
- Location: United School, M. R. Štefánik Street, Vrútky, Žilina, Slovakia
- Date: 11 June 2020 morning (CEST (UTC+2))
- Attack type: Mass stabbing
- Weapon: Knife
- Deaths: 2 (including the perpetrator)
- Injuries: 6 (4 by stabbing)
- Perpetrator: Ivan Čulok
- Motive: Unknown

On 11 June 2020, a 22-year-old man entered a primary school in Vrútky, Slovakia, armed with a knife, and attacked students and staff during morning hours. He was reportedly a former pupil of the school.

One adult staff member was killed, and four others were injured, including two children. The attacker fled the school after the initial attack but was shot and killed by police at the scene.

== Background ==
The incident occurred at the United School (Spojená škola) on M. R. Štefánika Street in Vrútky, a town in the Žilina Region of northern Slovakia. The school serves multiple age groups, including both primary and secondary students.

The attacker, later identified as 22-year-old Ivan Čulok from nearby Martin, was a former pupil of the school.

According to Slovak media and police statements, Čulok had previously shown signs of mental health difficulties and erratic behavior. Authorities stated there was no evidence of a political or religious motive, describing the attack as an isolated incident.

== Attack ==
On the morning of 11 June 2020, the perpetrator entered the school building by breaking a glass door and attacked staff members and pupils with a knife.

He fatally stabbed the school's deputy principal, a 51-year-old woman, and injured several others, including a caretaker, a female teacher, and two pupils who were later hospitalized.

Police officers who arrived at the scene confronted the attacker outside the building. When he resisted arrest, they opened fire, killing him on the spot.

== Victims ==
The attack claimed the life of the school's deputy principal, aged 51.

Four others were directly injured: a caretaker, a teacher who sustained serious injuries, and two students who were hospitalized but later recovered. Two policemen were indirectly injured by ricocheting bullet fragments.

The victims included both school staff and pupils, which deeply affected the local community.

== Aftermath and reactions ==
The incident was one of the rare but serious cases of school violence in Slovakia. President Zuzana Čaputová expressed condolences to the victims’ families and praised the police for their prompt response.

Education Minister Tomáš Drucker stated that the government would strengthen safety measures and mental-health support in Slovak schools to prevent similar attacks.

Media and community retrospectives later examined the suspect's background and the broader need for mental-health care and anti-bullying initiatives in Slovak schools.

== Investigation ==
Police launched an immediate investigation, and the General Inspection of the Security Forces of the Slovak Republic later ruled that officers acted lawfully when they used deadly force against the attacker.

Although the motive for the attack is unknown, the perpetrator was known to have been a frequent subject of bullying at the school, and had been obsessed with it in the following years.

== See also ==
- School violence
- List of attacks related to primary schools
- Spišská Stará Ves school stabbing — another school stabbing incident in Slovakia
