= Ján Kerekréti =

Slovak politician (1943–2026)

Member of the National Council of the Slovak Republic
- In office 20 March 2020 – 25 October 2023

Personal details
- Born: 25 October 1943
- Died: 28 April 2026 (aged 82) Bratislava, Slovakia
- Party: OĽANO
- Profession: Locomotive driver, church administrator

Ján Kerekréti (25 October 1943 – 28 April 2026) was a Slovak politician who served as a member of the National Council of the Slovak Republic from 2020 to 2023. He was elected for the Ordinary People and Independent Personalities (OĽANO) movement and sat in its parliamentary club. Outside politics, Kerekréti was a long-serving official of the Evangelical Church of the Augsburg Confession in Slovakia (ECAV) and general secretary of the Slovak Evangelical Alliance.

== Early life and education ==
Kerekréti was born on 25 October 1943 and was of Lutheran faith. Under the communist regime he was persecuted for his religious convictions, which prevented him from pursuing higher education. He instead studied at the Secondary Industrial School of Mechanical Engineering in Bratislava and went on to work as a locomotive driver.

== Church career ==
For 44 years Kerekréti worked at the General Bishop's Office of the Evangelical Church of the Augsburg Confession in Slovakia. He served as general secretary of the Slovak Evangelical Alliance (Slovenská evanjelická aliancia). In 2017 he was diagnosed with bone marrow cancer.

== Political career ==
In the 2020 Slovak parliamentary election Kerekréti stood in 22nd place on the OĽANO candidate list. He received 1,788 preferential votes and was elected to the National Council, where OĽANO won 53 seats. He served until the end of the parliamentary term on 25 October 2023.

During his mandate he sat on the Committee for Social Affairs and the Committee for the Incompatibility of Functions. He co-sponsored seven draft laws and five amendments.

In September 2022 Kerekréti collapsed during a plenary session of the National Council, forcing a temporary suspension of proceedings while paramedics attended to him. He regained consciousness and subsequently returned to parliamentary work.

== Death ==
Kerekréti died on 28 April 2026 at the age of 82. His death was announced by the Slovensko movement (the renamed OĽANO) and by the Evangelical Church. The funeral service was held on 9 May 2026 at the New Evangelical Church in Bratislava.
