= Marica Mikulová =

Slovak pupeteer (1951-2024)

- Born: Mária Mikulová; 15 May 1951; Bratislava, Czechoslovakia
- Died: 18 January 2024 (aged 72)
- Education: Academy of Performing Arts in Prague
- Occupation: Puppeteer

Mária Mikulová (15 May 1951 – 18 January 2024, professionally known as Marica Mikulová) was a Slovak puppeteer and theatre director.

== Biography ==
Marica Mikulová was born on 15 May 1951 in Bratislava. In 1976, Mikulová graduated from the Academy of Performing Arts in Prague. She joined the Gong ensemble in Bratislava as an artistic director, director and dramaturge.

Mikulová was a pioneer of "drama education" in Slovak puppet theatre in the 1970s and 1980s. In 1990, she became the first head of the puppetry department at the Academy of Performing Arts in Bratislava which she led for thirteen years. Mikulová continued to work as a teacher at the department for many years.

Mikulová died in January 2024.
