= Otto Šimko =

Slovak Holocaust survivor and Jurist (1924–2026)

Šimko in 1939

Otto Šimko (1 June 1924 – 10 February 2026) was a Slovak jurist and Holocaust survivor.

== Life and career ==
Šimko was born in Topoľčany on 1 June 1924, to Artúr and Irena Šimko. His father was a Jewish lawyer, later a judge. He spent most of his childhood in Nitra. He was a member of Hashomer Hatzair, Jewish scouts with a very strong left-wing and even communist orientation.

During World War II, and the adoption of the Anti-Jewish law, the police came for Šimko at their apartment in Nitra to deport him, however at the time he was working, digging a canal in Svätý Jur as an employee of the Jewish work center. His father ended up in prison in Ilava because he was a social democrat.

In 1942, Otto's family was transported to a camp in Žilina, from where they were supposed to be sent to a concentration camp, but thanks to false baptismal certificates provided by Otto's uncle, he was instead transferred to a labor camp in Vyhne. They were in the camp for ten months until they received a departmental exemption, which was granted to them by the then minister of justice Gejza Fritz. They settled in Liptovský Mikuláš, where Šimko worked as a bookbinder.

During the Slovak National Uprising, he served in the 9th Liptov partisan detachment. He was arrested in Liptovský Mikuláš and brutally interrogated by the police. He fell ill with scabies, and escaped during treatment in Palúdzka and later hid in Nitra. After the war he moved to Bratislava. He graduated from the Faculty of Law of the Slovak University (today Comenius University) in 1949. After graduation, he got a job at the Social Welfare Commission. As a Jew and a politically unreliable person, he was a threat to the communist regime and was later reassigned to production and relieved of his position. After moving to Martin, he accepted the position of a turner and shortly afterwards the position of an educator, where he published the cyclostyled magazine "Reserves of Peace". In the mid-1950s, he returned to Bratislava and in 1954 he began working in the editorial office of the daily Smena as a foreign policy editor, as he knew French, German and English. As an editor, he had an exit clause and was able to visit Africa and Japan. After the occupation of Czechoslovakia and party background checks, he was fired from the editorial office in 1971. He devoted himself to law as a company lawyer and was employed at a construction plant in Bratislava, where he worked under the supervision of the State Security until his retirement.

Šimko died on 10 February 2026, at the age of 101.

== Awards ==
In 2017, Šimko was given the Memory of Nations Award. In 2025, he was awarded the White Crow for Lifetime Achievement. According to the organizers of the award: "As a young man with a gun in his hand, he stood up against Nazism during the Slovak National Uprising. He was a critic of the communist regime, which considered him an enemy person and deprived him of his job. He is not indifferent to the fate of the country and the world in which he lives, even at the age of 101. To the extent possible, he engages in the public debate and supports Ukraine."
