= Lucia Palugyayová =

- Born: 1977 or 1978
- Died: 20 February 2024 (aged 46)
- Occupation: Television presenter

Lucia Palugyayová (died 20 February 2024) was a Slovak television presenter and speech therapist.

== Biography ==
Palugyayová was a speech therapist who specialised in early childhood education.

She was the presenter of the popular children's television programme Rapotáčik on the Jojko channel. The show focused on speech development for preschool children. As well as being the presenter she was also a scriptwriter. In 2019, she published a children's book which was in the top 10 of children's books in Slovakia.

On 20 February 2024, Palugyayová died suddenly from a stroke she suffered in the shower. She was 46 years old. She is survived by her husband and two teenage children.
