= Elena Baranová =

Slovak linguist and philologist (1945–2026)

- Born: 12 October 1945; Martin, Czechoslovakia
- Died: 14 July 2026 (aged 80); Banská Bystrica, Slovakia
- Education: Comenius University
- Occupations: Linguist; Philologist

Elena Baranová (12 October 1945 – 14 July 2026) was a Slovak linguist and philologist. Baranová closely studied the French language, writing her doctoral thesis on the subjunctive tense. She took part in the Intercultural Studies for Teachers Education to Promote European Citizenship and gave lectures on the Slovak language at the University of Rennes. Baranová died in Banská Bystrica on 14 July 2026, at the age of 80.
