= Róbert Cvi Bornstein =

Czechoslovak antifascist fighter (1926–2024)

- Bornstein in 2017
- Born: 23 February 1926; Prešov, Czechoslovakia
- Died: 28 May 2024 (aged 98); Tel Aviv, Israel
- Known for: Participation in the Slovak National Uprising

Róbert Cvi Bornstein (23 February 1926 – 28 May 2024) was a Slovak anti-fascist fighter and Holocaust survivor.

== Biography ==
Róbert Bornstein was born on 23 February 1926 in Prešov into a religiously observant Jewish family. His father was a shop owner, his mother was a housewife. He had one elder sister, Marta. Bornstein became active in a socialist Zionist movement Hashomer Hatzair in his early years. During World War II, his family was originally protected from deportation due to his father's status as an "economically important Jew" but Bornstein was nonetheless forced to abandon his studies at the Evangelical Lyceum and instead apprentice as a baker. In spite of not being able to graduate, Bornstein maintained contacts with the Lyceum for the rest of his life and served as the face of the "empty chair" project commemorating the Jewish students of the Lyceum who were persecuted due to their origin by the fascist First Slovak Republic.

In the early 1944, Bornstein joined the Slovak National Uprising, despite his father pleading with him not to. He fought in the "Žula" (granite) artillery unit. Meanwhile, his father died in the Auschwitz concentration camp and his mother perished in the concentration camp in Gliwice. After the defeat of the uprising, Bornstein learned about the fate of his parents from a rabbi from Prešov. He himself was saved by the Christian family, who took over his father's business. He was able to escape to Bratislava, where he hid in an abandoned apartment together with his uncle and his family. He was also able to facilitate a fake passport allowing his sister to leave for a relative safety of Budapest.

After the end of the war, Bornstein finished his high school studies while working in an orphanage in Prešov established by Hashomer Hatzair and facilitated emigration of Jews to Israel. He himself left in 1949. In Israel he adopted the second name Cvi (sometimes transcribed as Zvi). He lived in a kibbutz for five years and later trained as a lawyer. He spent the rest of his life practicing law in Tel Aviv. In Israel, Bornstein married and had two sons.

Bornstein died on 28 May 2024, aged 98, in Tel Aviv. His death was confirmed by the Lyceum.

== Autobiography ==
In 2020, Bornstein published an autobiography titled Záblesky v temnote – Prvých 23 rokov môjho života (Flashes in the Dark - The First 23 Years of My Life) in which he described his youth and experiences with Nazism.
