= Dana Herrmannová =

Slovak television presenter (1931–2024)

- Born: Dagmar Fišerová; 26 June 1931; Bratislava, Czechoslovakia (now Slovakia)
- Died: 7 December 2024 (aged 93); Slovakia
- Occupation: television presenter
- Known for: Being the face of the Czechoslovak Television broadcasts during the Warsaw Pact invasion of Czechoslovakia
- Awards: Presidential Medal (2003)

Dagmar "Dana" Herrmannová (née Fišerová; 26 June 1931 – 7 December 2024) was a Slovak television presenter. She was well-known in Czechoslovakia for broadcasting live for hours during the special Czechoslovak Television coverage of the Warsaw Pact invasion of Czechoslovakia, until the broadcast was forcefully ended by the Soviet invaders.

== Biography ==
Dana Herrmannová was born as Dana Fišerová on 26 June 1931 in Bratislava. Both of her parents were tailors. Due to anti-Jewish persecutions in the fascist Slovak Republic, the family changed its name from Fišer to the Slovak equivalent Rybár. She was educated at the grammar school for girls on the Dunajská street in the Bratislava Old Town. In the last year of high school, she met her future husband, the basketball player Gustáv Herrmann. The couple quickly married and had a daughter, Kristína.

She was discovered by accident by members of a Czechoslovak Television production crew while exercising at a gym during maternal leave. The television staff reckoned her youthful, athletic image would be a good fit for the television's efforts to reach broader audience in line with the general liberalisation of the society during the Prague Spring and invited her to audition for the role of a presenter. Her first role at the Czechoslovak Television was introducing short reports on youth sports activities in Czechoslovakia. In 1966, she was promoted to an anchor of the main news program.

=== 1968 Warsaw Pact invasion ===
Herrmannová was not scheduled to be broadcasting on 21 August 1968, when the armies of the Warsaw pact countries invaded Czechoslovakia to forcefully end the Prague Spring and restore an orthodox communist regime. Nonetheless, she rushed to the studio when she noticed tanks in the streets. For several hours, Herrmanová and her colleagues reported on civil society protests against the occupation as well as the statements of the Czechoslovak political leadership. Her broadcasting was eventually dramatically interrupted by a Soviet soldier aiming a gun at her in the studio.

For the following two weeks, Herrmannová and her colleagues continued to broadcast from various locations, including garages. Afterwards, she was fired from the Czechoslovak television, alongside her colleagues who refused to publicly declare support for the occupation. For the next 20 years, Herrmannová made a living as an English language teacher and translator.

=== Rehabilitation and television comeback ===
After the Velvet Revolution ended the communist regime in Czechoslovakia, the new director of the Czechoslovak television apologized for the unjustified firing of Herrmannová 20 years earlier, and she was allowed to return to broadcasting. For the subsequent 20 years, Herrmannová hosted her talk show. Her first guest was Alexander Dubček, the leader of Czechoslovakia during the Prague Spring era.

== Death ==
Herrmannová died on 7 December 2024, at the age of 93.

== Recognition ==
In 2003, Herrmannová was awarded a Presidential Medal by the then President of Slovakia, Rudolf Schuster.
