= Vladimír Popovič =

Slovak painter (1939–2025)

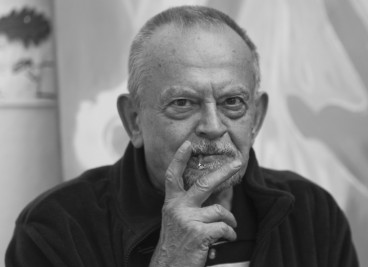
- Popovič in 2010
- Born: 27 November 1939; Uhrovec, Slovak Republic
- Died: 20 April 2025 (aged 85); Bratislava, Slovakia

Vladimír Popovič (27 November 1939 – 20 April 2025) was a Slovak painter, visual artist and academic.

== Biography ==
Vladimír Popovič was born on 27 November 1939 in Uhrovec, Vysoká nad Uhom, now in eastern Slovakia. He grew up at the foothills of the High Tatras.

After completing the Academy of Fine Arts and Design in Bratislava (1959–1965) he presented his first "crumpled paper" works, object assemblages and action art involving paper.

He regularly took part in international symposia in painting, enamel, and paper.

Popovič died in Bratislava on 20 April 2025, at the age of 85.
