= Albín Brunovský =

Slovak painter, graphic artist, lithographer, illustrator and pedagogue

Albín Brunovský (25 December 1935 – 20 January 1997) was a Slovak painter, graphic artist, lithographer, illustrator and pedagogue. He is considered one of the greatest Slovak painters of the 20th century.

== Biography ==
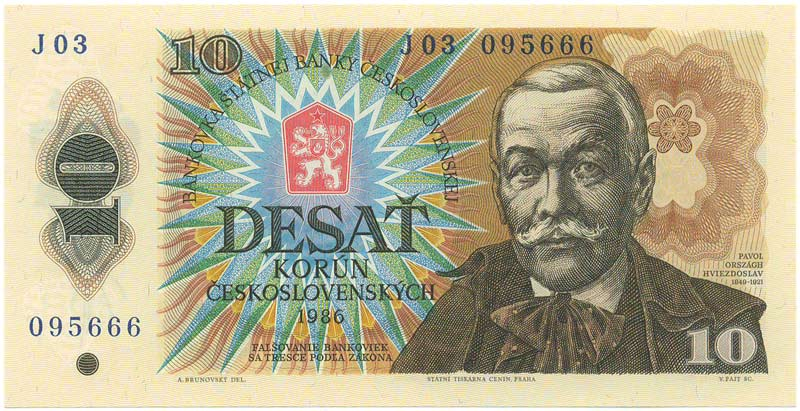
Design of 1980's emission of Czechoslovak banknotes

Albín Brunovský was born in Zohor, Czechoslovakia, on 25 December 1935. He started his early career in art by working on stage set and poster design. He studied at the Academy of Fine Arts and Design, Bratislava under Prof. Vincent Hložník from 1955 to 1961.

The Hloznik School was well known for its high artistic and technical preparation in graphic arts and its humanist perspective. For the founder, as for many of his students, Goya's great graphic cycle "The Horrors of War" served as a pattern or model. Brunovský himself lectured at that Academy from 1966 to 1990.

In 1981 he was appointed a professor, creating his own engraving school several years later. Brunovský's work often mirrored that of the modern movement, citation art. Brunovský was also the designer of the last series of Czechoslovak banknotes. His illustrations were primarily for children's books.

Albín Brunovský was repeatedly awarded at the Bratislava Illustration Biennial. In 1967, he was a co-founder of the international exhibition of original illustrations for children's books, the Bratislava Illustration Biennial, within which he founded and led the UNESCO - BIB workshop for illustrators from developing countries. A. Brunovský represents the imaginative position of illustration. His work is characterized by a sense of detail and miniature drawing, which results in ornamentalization, often creating a decorative image.

Over the course of his career, Brunovský experimented with various graphic techniques and was highly influenced in his subject matter by poetry and literature, as well, of course, as by other artists. While at school he used the techniques of woodcuts and linocuts. Soon after, however, he began experimenting with "scraper" and chalk lithography. Etching were the characteristic mode of his graphic art work during the mid-1960s. He was, however, a painter too. Many of his illustrations were done in watercolor and he eventually began to paint major works.

As his mastery of various techniques evolved over time, so too did his vision as an artist. When he was young, Brunovský exhibited surrealistic tendencies—defined as a tendency to individualism and absurdity and the unchecked play of the subconscious. Later his work became more evaluative and critical of Man in relation to himself and society.

Brunovský died in Bratislava on 20 January 1997.

== Quote ==
I have such a creative program that pushes me to work. My pictures are simply doing with me what they want. Sometimes I don't feel like working. But when I come to my studio and I notice, that one work is not ready and the other one hopeless, I go and sit next to them for a while and suddenly I realise that there is evening. And in this way every morning I let myself to be pleasantly abused by my paintings that allow me to dream. (Albín Brunovský)

[Slovak talent of the communist era] "grew in the vegetables" (Albín Brunovský) [he uses] "nature and its elements to depict the reality of dreams" (Albín Brunovský)

== Works ==
- The Meeting of Numismatists
- A Lady with a Hat
- Vernissage in Nature
- illustrations of "Modrá kniha rozprávok" - The Blue Book of Fairy Tales
- Czechoslovak banknotes
- seven pictures on walnut woods in the lobby of the new building of the National Council of the Slovak Republic
