= Tibor Spitz =

American painter

- Born: 1929 (age 96–97); Dolný Kubín, Czechoslovakia

Tibor Spitz (born 1929) is a Slovak-born artist and Holocaust survivor. After escaping from communist Czechoslovakia to the West, he lived and worked in Canada and the United States. He currently resides in Kingston, New York.

== Biography ==
In 1929, Tibor Spitz was born in a small town called Dolný Kubín in the high mountains of northern Slovakia, at that time part of Czechoslovakia.

His work was exhibited at New Paltz NY Gallery UNISON in 2022.

In 2008 Canadian drama director Valeria Thothova used his paintings in her book "Shalom" issued in Canada. In 2022 he participated in a PBS documentary film titled, "We Remember: Songs of Survivors".
