= Olga Horak =

Slovak-born Australian author and Holocaust survivor (1926–2024)

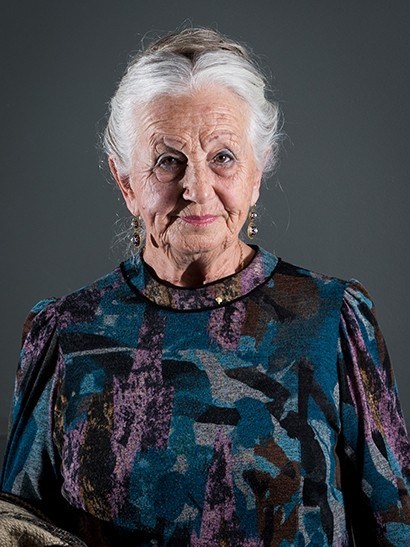
Olga Horak in 2023

Olga Horak OAM (née Rosenberger; 11 August 1926 – 15 August 2024) was a Slovak-born Australian author, artist and Holocaust survivor. Horak was awarded the Medal of the Order of Australia on 26 January 2014 as part of the Australia Day Honours List.

Born in 1926 in Bratislava in what was then Czechoslovakia to Piroska (née Weiss; 1905–1945) and Hugo Rosenberger (1894–1944), she was transported by the Nazis to Auschwitz in 1944 and later, in early January 1945, aged 17, to Bergen-Belsen. She was the sole survivor of her family. Her sister, Judith (1925–1942) was murdered in Auschwitz in 1942. Her father was transported to Auschwitz in 1944 and her mother died the day after Belsen was liberated by the British on 15 April 1945. She and her husband John Horak emigrated to Australia in 1949 and established Hibodress, a garment business. In 2000, she published her memoir, Auschwitz to Australia.

== 1939–1942 ==
Olga Rosenberger was born on 11 August 1926 in Czechoslovakia, and lived in Bratislava with her family for her first 15 years. In 1939, the Nuremberg Laws were passed in Slovakia and the Second World War started. She and her older sister, Judith, were unable to continue their schooling at Zivnodom, a German high school. She was forced to wear the Star of David on her chest. She said, "I was not ashamed to wear the star ... I was endangered on the street where some people abused me with foul language and bodily harm."

On 21 March 1942, the Germans ordered all Bratislava's single Jews born before 1925 to report to the local train station to 'finally do some work'. Olga's sister Judith boarded a train with 999 other Jewish teenagers, and was taken to Auschwitz, where she was murdered two weeks before her 17th birthday. After living under increasing hardship and with the constant fear of being deported, Horak's parents made the decision to escape from Slovakia and go to Hungary.

== Hungary ==
Horak and her family left Bratislava with other relatives. Left with an overnight bag and no documents, Horak, 16 at the time, worried about looking fat in the numerous layers in which her mother had clothed her. These were the only clothes she would have for the next year and a half. They boarded the train in two groups and travelled to Hegyeshalom, a village on the Hungarian border. There, they met a guide who took them across the border. They would walk all night before finally reaching a small Hungarian village at dawn. They sought rest at a small cottage before catching a train to Budapest. They found a small room to rent under the supervision of another Jewish family, the Königs. They never found out about Olga's true heritage, as the family always used the excuse that Hugo Rosenberger needed medical treatment in Budapest. Olga slept on a stretcher on the floor.

== Return to Bratislava ==
As the situation in Hungary worsened, Horak's father began making arrangements to return to Bratislava. They had the same guide as in 1942 and took roughly the same route. They took the train and stopped at the same little Hungarian border village. On the way out of the station, Hungarian gendarmes were positioned to verify papers and travel documents. Horak and her parents got through safely. Her Aunt Aranka and Uncle Jacob did not; they were deported to Auschwitz while their 15-year-old son, Thomas, kept walking. He never saw his parents again.

In late August 1944, the Germans invaded Slovakia. Olga's cousin Eugene, a young solicitor who worked with the Underground, was pushed from the third story of a building in broad daylight. With the invasion of the Germans came more deportations to death camps. In early August 1944, Horak and her family were told to go to Marianka, another area outside of Bratislava. After two weeks, a group of SS guards and Hlinka Guards surrounded the building.

== Auschwitz ==
Olga was transported to Sereď, a collection point for Slovak Jews located 55 kilometres (34 mi) northeast of Bratislava. There the commander, Alois Brunner, would entertain himself by shooting prisoners at random. Olga, her parents, her grandmother, and about 120 other people, were shoved into a cattle car that normally would have held eight horses. Horak did not know how long she was in the train to Auschwitz but said:

After a long and seemingly unending journey, the train slowed and came to a halt. We had arrived. I could hear dogs barking and voices shouting in German. All of a sudden, the bolts on our doors were slammed back and the door rolled open. Daylight flooded into our dark car and the light hit our eyes and blinded us. Strangely, amidst all the yelling and screaming, I could hear music. An orchestra was playing light operatic tunes to 'welcome' us. It hit me that the music belonged not to the world of the living but of the dead. The merry tunes were really the songs of unbelievable heartache and immeasurable sorrow. The bizarre nature of everything I saw and heard stunned me. All around, people were being pulled out of the cars. Guards shouted at them: Raus raus! — "Get out, get out!" Strange figures in blue and grey striped garb with caps ran around telling us to leave our baggage on the ramp. And, all the time, everything had to be done in a hurry: Schnell schnell! — "Quickly, quickly!" I looked up and saw an iron gate over which there was an inscription: Arbeit macht Frei — Freedom through Work.

Horak had arrived at Auschwitz, where she underwent Selektion. Horak was separated from her father after they came off the train. She never saw him again. Olga, her mother, and the remaining female members of her family who were at Sereď, were forced to strip and to pass an inspection done by the infamous Mengele. Horak and her mother were sent to the right; the ones sent to the left were killed. She was at Auschwitz until October 1944. One morning, after Appell (roll call), Olga and some 1,000 other female prisoners were told not to return to the barracks. She feared the worst, but as she put it, "At this point, I didn't care anymore. They could have done what they liked."

== Kurzbach ==
Horak and her mother were sent to Kurzbach, a small German village with only a few, small, low-built houses and a newly built straw barn. Kurzbach was cold, and she was given only a paper bag and a grey blanket to keep warm during the cold winter. Every day, they went into the woods and picked logs for the soldiers to cover up their hideout. Horak recalls: "... I prayed that help would come, either from heaven or from the Allies". During one roll call, late in December 1944, the prisoners were ordered to form columns, five abreast, and to start marching. It would be a long time before they stopped.

== Death march ==
Horak was still with her mother. They walked the same route they took every morning to the forest but, instead of turning right at the end of the village, they kept going. They could hear gunfire and could see an airplane above them—the Allied forces were near. The SS guards pushed them, even though they were visibly weak. The soldiers said, "Anyone who stops will be shot". So everyone marched. Horak's cousins, Lilly and Trude, were at the end of their strength. Lilly was suffering from a severe cold, high temperature and a bad earache. They fell out of the column and sat by the road. Horak and her mother tried, in vain, to get them up but they would not move. Horak said, "They had taken enough and were beyond caring what happened to them." So they kept walking, fearing the worst. An hour later Russian forces found them by the side of the road.

Horak and her mother had marched for nearly 375 kilometres before arriving in Dresden. There they were shoved, once again, into open cattle cars. Before the train left, they were caught up in one of the three air raids by the British Royal Air Force over Dresden. "During the raid, we watched as the bombs fell like manna from heaven. We were not scared, even as shrapnel flew around us..." Within a few minutes of the raid's end, the train was moving again. They were on their way to Bergen-Belsen, with no food or water for the long journey.

== Bergen-Belsen ==
Inside Bergen-Belsen the camp were many rows of primitive barracks along the camp roads. Rations were just some black water, a small slice of black bread, and sometimes a watery soup after night roll call. The roll call continued even though the remaining prisoners had been left for dead. In the last weeks before they were liberated, conditions became even worse. Their bread ration was reduced to less than a slice per day, and then was stopped completely. Then, for the last week, their water stopped. There were still 60,000 inmates in the camp.

On 15 April 1945, Bergen-Belsen's inmates lined up for roll call; nobody came. Suddenly, they became aware of the situation around them, hearing the noise of tanks. There were no SS guards in sight. As the hum got closer they realised that the noise was of British tanks and Canadian forces. Within hours of securing the camp, they brought in DDT to delouse the survivors. They also brought in food and left it outside the barracks. But after years of enforced starvation, survivors were physically incapable of eating even the most basic foodstuffs without repercussions. After the food was distributed, the British started up a registry to take an accounting of the survivors. Horak and her mother were issued with 'Displaced Persons' cards and registered as survivors. Shortly after exiting the tent, Olga's mother collapsed. "My mother had survived Auschwitz, a death march from Kurzbach to Dresden, the journey to Belsen and four months in that cesspool, only to die moments after being registered as a survivor".

== Post war ==
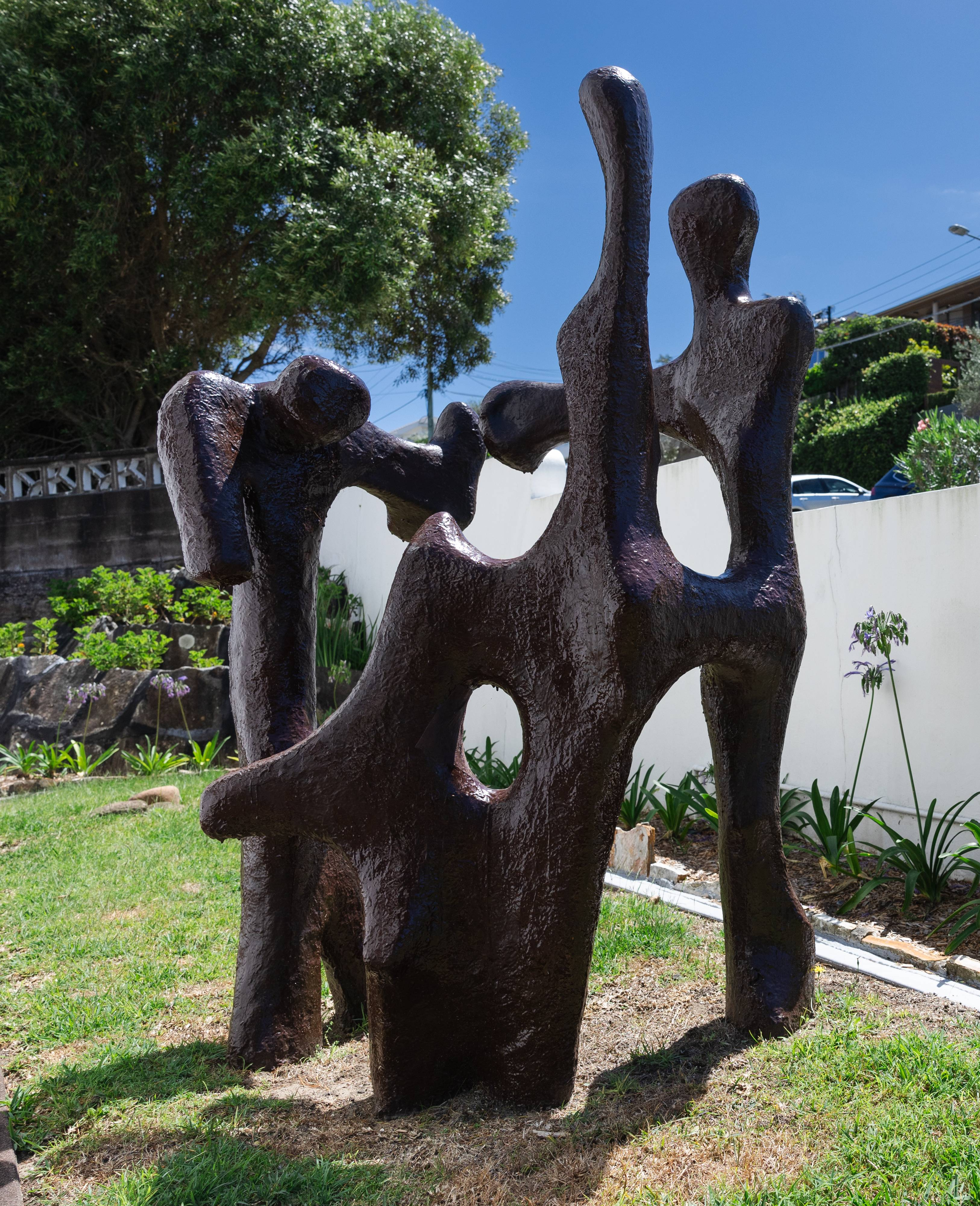
Olga Horak, The Family, 1966, cement fibre glass, coated, 163 x 100 cm. Photo: Giselle Haber, January 2024.

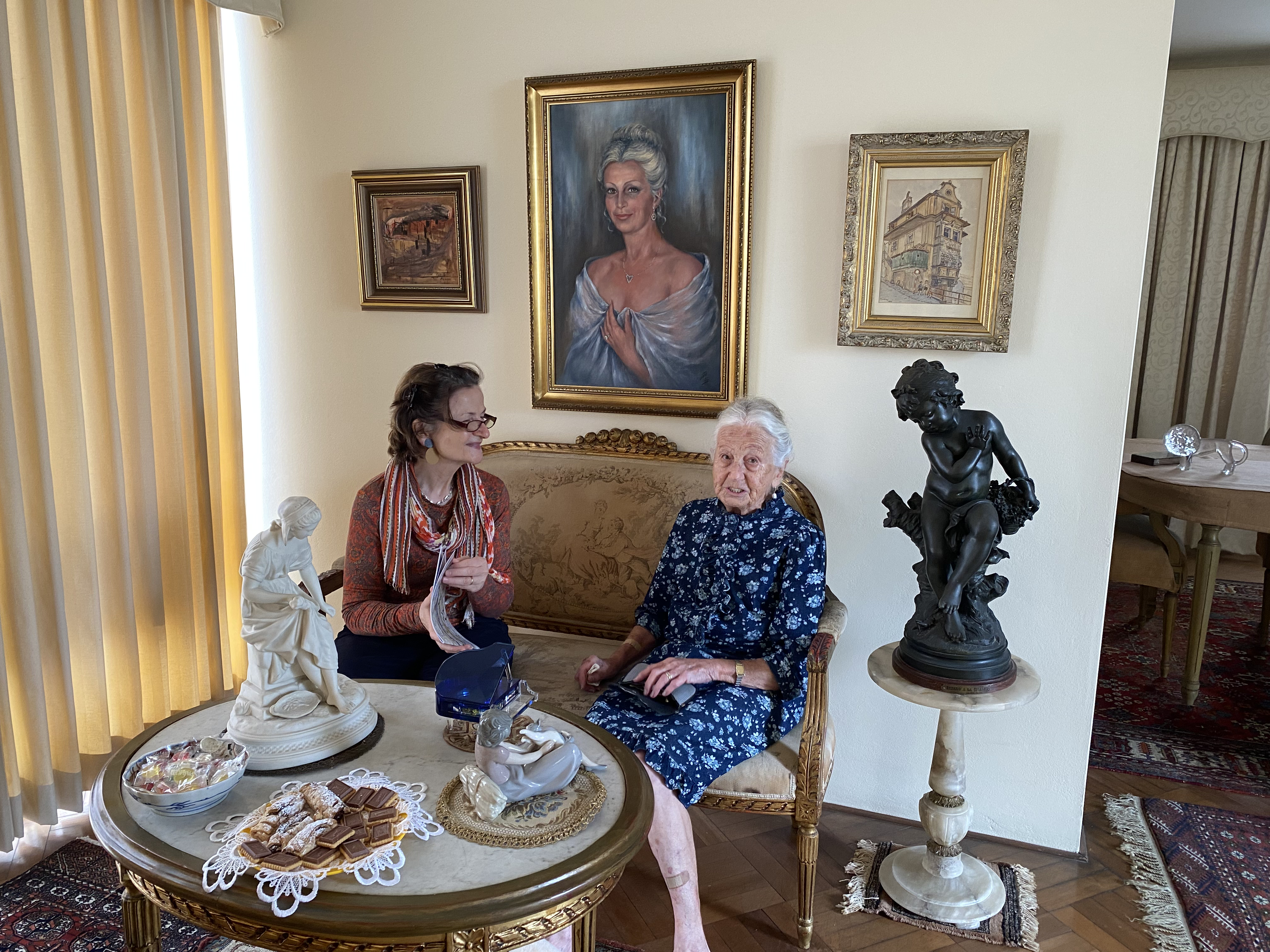
Jana Vytrhlik and Olga Horak at her home. Photo by Anne Slade, December 2022

Olga survived the Holocaust, but lost her family. Her mother, father, sister and grandmothers were all dead. After her mother died, Olga was taken to the camp's sickbay. From there, she was transferred to the town hospital in Celle, but was transferred back because the German nurses would not attend to a Jewish patient. When a Catholic priest from the British Army came and wanted to administer the last rites, she asked him to desist as she "was not a Catholic" and "was not dying". At her request, the priest, with a rabbi, arranged for her to be transferred back to the sickbay at Bergen-Belsen. She stayed there until the camp was burned to the ground. She was then transferred by military Hospital train to the State Hospital in Plzeň.

Olga Rosenberger stayed in Plzeň until she was healthy enough to return to Bratislava, where she encountered her cousin Thomas, also an orphan. She stayed with relatives, the Bardos family. Zsuzsi, her cousin, offered to set Horak up with her friend's brother, John Horak. Olga and John married on 9 February 1947. John and Olga were determined to start a life outside Europe and away from the horrors they had suffered. They applied through regular channels and were eventually granted Landing Permits, which allowed them to travel to Australia. Travelling on the Greek ship Cyrenia, they left in August 1949, disembarking in Melbourne on 16 September 1949. From Melbourne, they traveled immediately to Sydney. Two weeks after arriving, John and Olga established the Hibodress garment factory. Horak lived in Sydney, and was a volunteer guide at the Sydney Jewish Museum. She donated several of her artifacts to the museum.

On 15 August 2024, it was announced that Horak had died at the age of 98.

== Artistic Legacy ==
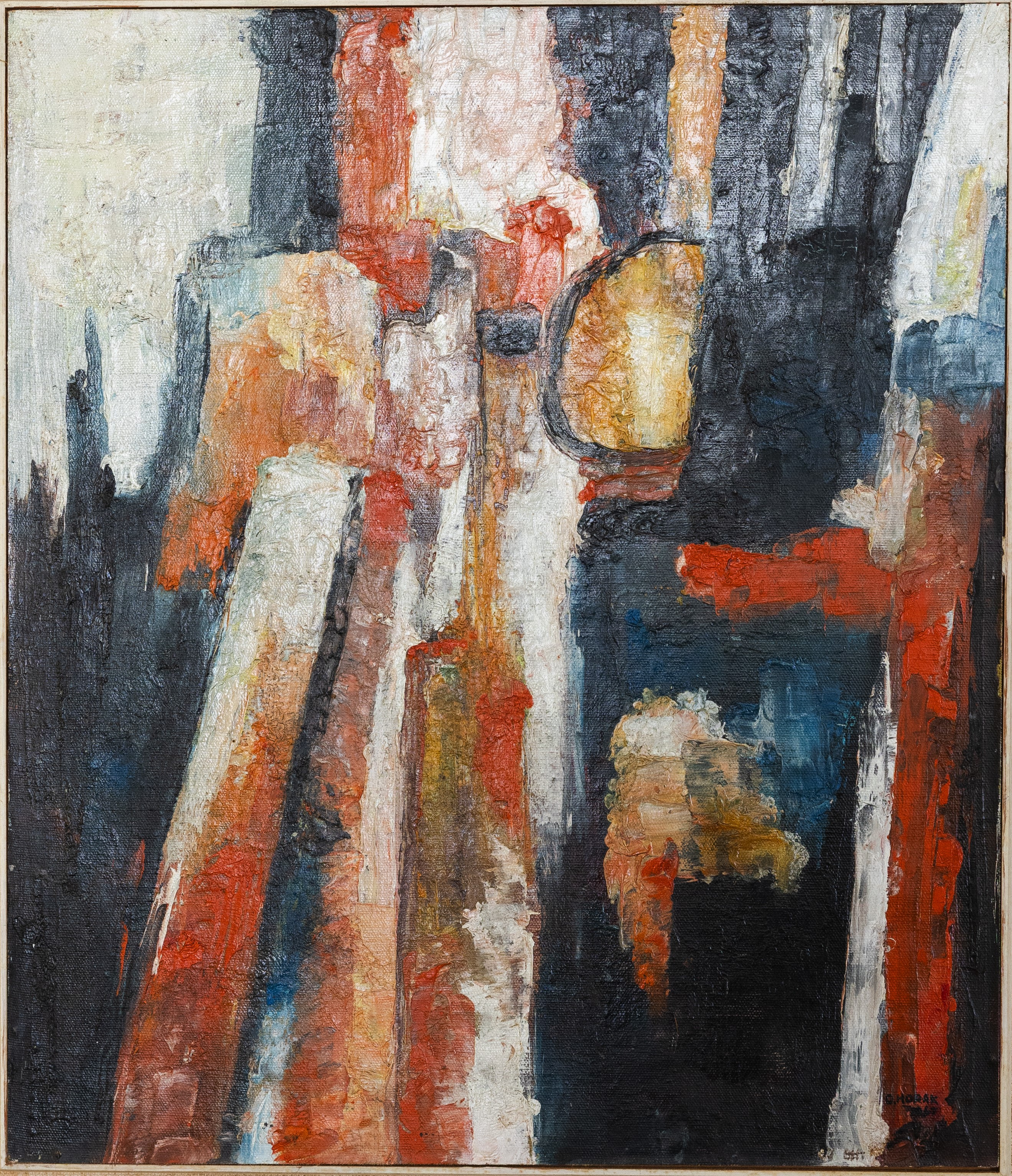
Olga Horak, William Street at Night, 1963, oil on canvas paper, 45 x 38 cm. Photo: Giselle Haber, January 2024

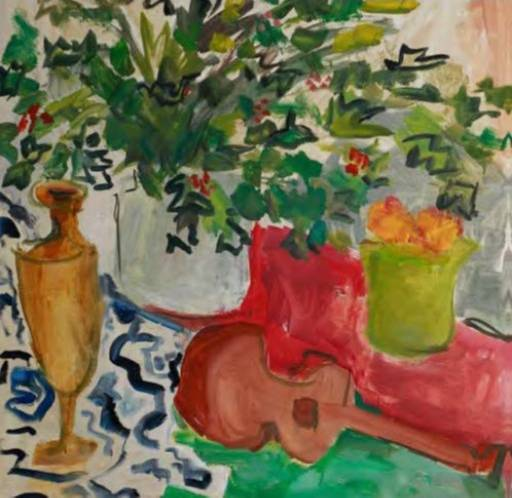
Olga Horak, Still life, 1960s, oil on canvas paper, 80 x 76 cm. Photo: Goldstone Gallery, April 2025

In her public life, Olga Horak shared her Holocaust testimony with schoolchildren, diplomats, and countless visitors at the Sydney Jewish Museum. Privately, however, she pursued a lifelong passion for the visual arts. Between the 1960s and 1990s, in evening art classes and in her basement studio, Olga Horak created a remarkable and large body of work—paintings, sketches and sculptures—which only in late 2024 have come to light.

Curators Dr Jana Vytrhlik and Nina Sanadze, who independently and at different moments identified the significance of Horak's never exhibited artistic legacy, have not only released Olga Horak's art from anonymity, but have secured its rightful place within the broader story of postwar Australian art and the creative legacies of Holocaust survivors.

Horak described herself as "an amateur who loved colours," recalling that as a child in Bratislava, she was encouraged to draw and paint. She briefly attended art lessons before the Holocaust cruelly changed her life. Horak resumed her creative journey in Australia in 1960. In John Ogburn's Art Studio, Olga developed a bold, expressive style, favouring vibrant colour and intuitive composition. "I was never bogged down with a detail," she said. "My composition grew organically and in harmony with colours." Her teacher in sculpture, Lyndon Dadswell—the first official Australian war artist—encouraged her to approach the human figure with sensitivity to form rather than trauma. She was also inspired by artists such as Henry Moore.

In April 2025, Olga Horak's art was publicly exhibited for the first time at Goldstone Gallery in Melbourne in a solo show titled In Her Light. The exhibition revealed a body of work—still lifes, abstract compositions, nudes, and sculptural studies—characterised by striking colours and emotional freedom. "My paintings and sculptures," she once remarked, "were not for public eyes. They were my diary when the words failed me." Her artistic legacy, hidden for decades, now offers a new dimension to her life story: not only as a survivor and educator, but also as a talented and intuitive visual artist.

Olga Horak's large Family sculpture, 1966, was generously donated by Horak's Family in 2024 to the Holocaust Memorial and Education Centre in Canberra, where it will be on display on completion of the Centre. Prior to its removal from the site, the sculpture was 3D scanned by Zac Levi, a photogrammetry specialist and real-time modeller, to ensure its preservation and to enhance accessibility for a broader audience.

== Sources ==
- Auschwitz to Australia – A Holocaust Survivor's Memoir, Simon & Schuster, Sydney: 2000; ISBN 978-0-7318-0958-5
- Jana Vytrhlik in-person interviews with Olga Horak between February and August 2024.
