= Bratislavská lýra =

Former Czechoslovak song contest

- Awarded for: Song popularity
- Location: Bratislava
- Country: Czechoslovakia (1966–1990); Slovakia (1997)
- Formerly called: Medzinárodný festival tanečnej piesne Bratislavská lýra

Bratislavská lýra was a Czechoslovak and later Slovak festival of popular songs that took place every year from 1966 until 1990 and was held in Bratislava. It was renewed in 1997 but cancelled again in 1998. The festival involved national and international contests as well as concerts by international musicians.

== History ==
Between 1964 and 1965, composers Ján Siváček and Pavol Zelenay had the idea to create a festival, and they became its organizers. The event was first held in 1966 in the Park kultúry a oddychu (PKO), under the name Medzinárodný festival tanečnej piesne Bratislavská lýra ("Bratislava Lýra international dance song festival"), with sound provided by Slovenský rozhlas (later Česko-slovenský rozhlas). Winners of the national contest received an award, the Bratislavská lýra (Bratislava lyre), which became the festival's name in 1968.

The national contest was organized for Slovak and Czech singers, who were awarded gold, silver, and bronze trophies. In 1966 and 1967, the festival involved an international contest entitled "Golden Clef" (Slovak: Zlatý kľúč), in some sources translated as "Golden Key". This contest, organized for members of the International Radio and Television Organisation, was broadcast live via the Intervision network and aimed to compete with the West-European Eurovision Song Contest. Other awards in the festival included the Critics' Award, Journalists' Award, Audience Award, Popular Award, and Lifetime Achievement Award.

Notable winners in the event's first year included famous Czech singer Karel Gott, together with composers Vieroslav Matušík and Eliška Jelínková, for the song "Mám rozprávkový dom". Throughout its years of existence, the festival showcased the talent of some of the biggest musical stars in Czechoslovakia, as well as various international celebrities, including the Beach Boys (1969), Cliff Richard (1970, 1971), Boney M. (1977), Smokie (1983), Donovan (1983), Mireille Mathieu (1985), and Joe Cocker (1998 – the last year of the event's revival).

In 1975, the festival won an award from the International Federation of Festival Organizations (FIDOF), being only the fourth festival worldwide to receive this honour, and the first in the Socialist Bloc.

Bratislavská lýra was discontinued in 1990, after the Velvet Revolution. Conductor and music director Vladimír Valovič purchased the trademark in 1996 and revived the festival the following year. The 1997 edition was used to select the Slovak representative for the 1998 Eurovision Song Contest. It was canceled once more in 1998, due to a lack of financial support and sponsorships. As of 2006, Valovič still had plans to relaunch the event at a later date. On 19 October 2016, fifty years after the first edition, the gala concert Lýra 50 Mám rozprávkový dom was held in Bratislava, with the participation of former winners and festival participants.

== Controversy ==
In 1989, Joan Baez invited Ivan Hoffman, who had recorded the anti-communist song "Nech mi nehovoria" (Stop Telling Me), to take the stage. After about a minute, however, the organizers muted his microphone.
