= Kubeck =

Kubeck or Kübeck is a surname. Notable people with the surname include:

- Candi Kubeck (1961–1996), American airline pilot
- Detlef Kübeck (born 1956), East German sprinter
