= Janos Quittner =

Slovak choreographer (1941–2024)

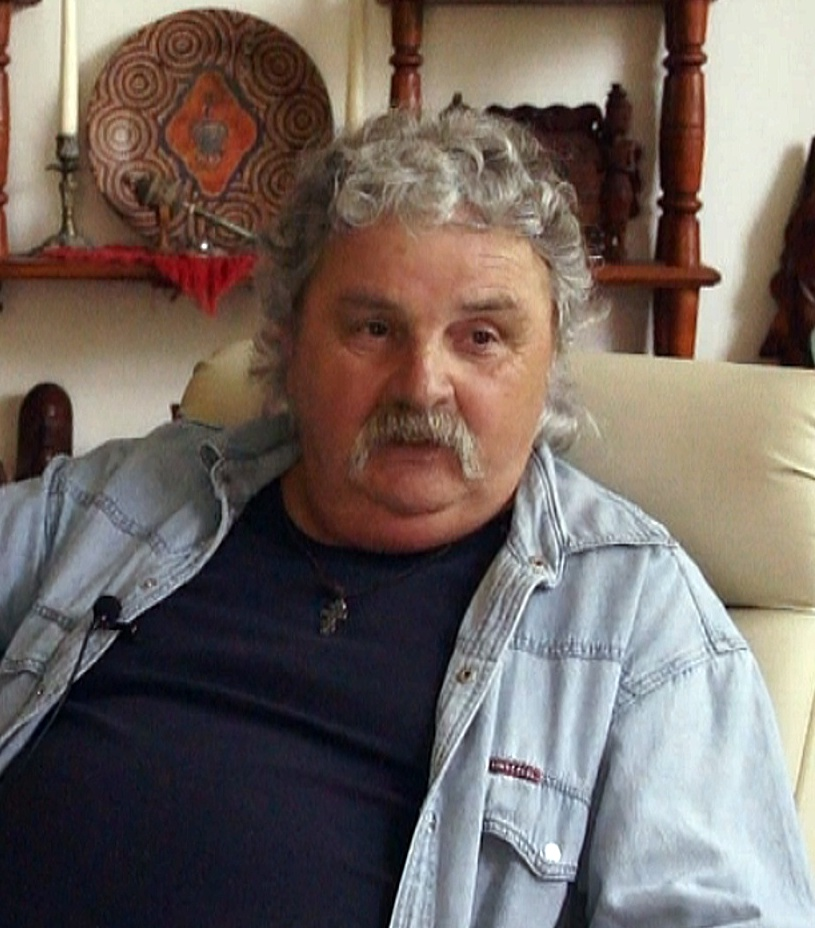
- Born: 27 September 1941; Bratislava, Slovak Republic
- Died: 21 June 2024 (aged 82)
- Years active: 1962–2006

Janos Quittner (Slovak: Ján Quittner; 27 September 1941 – 21 June 2024) was a Slovak dancer, choreographer and director.

== Family history ==
Quittner was born in Vrakuňa part of Bratislava as the fourth child of a family who have lived in Bratislava for centuries. His grandfather was a high-ranked soldier, Jakab Pál Quittner (died 1942). His maternal grandfather, János Párkánynánay Cseresznyés, was also a high-ranked military officer (died 1941). His paternal grandmother Franciska Világi Álló was born in Nadasd, in the Csallóköz region (died 1943). His grandparents on both sides were buried at the András cemetery, Bratislava but their tombs were dismantled together with many Hungarian and German tombs in the 1980s.

His father, Sándor Quittner, according to the family tradition, was designated to have a military career. So it happened that he, as a cadet at the age of 16 in World War I fell into the power of the Russians, and as a consequence of the Trianon Treaty could return to Pozsony only ten years later (died 1962). His mother, Irén Párkánynánay Cseresznyés died in 1978. Both rest in the Márton cemetery, Pozsony.

In 1961, at the age of 20, he married Rozália Tekauer, whom he met in the above-mentioned Csallóközi Folk Song and Dance Ensemble. Their children were born in Pozsony: Yvett Anna in 1962 and János Sándor in 1963.

== Biography ==
From 1947 to 1952 he studied at the basic school of his native village Pozsony-Vereknye. He was a student of the nine-grade state civil secondary art school in Pozsony. It was his father who sent him to a school with Slovak as the language of instruction, with the intention of minimizing the potential for possible conflicts with the state. This art school made him love everything associated with scenic arts and dance. As a secondary school student, he often attended folk dance rehearsals of the Felső-Csallóközi Folk Ensemble operating in Pozsonypüspöki, and later to the Csallóközi Folk Song and Dance Ensemble to Somorja.

In 1967 he graduated from the four-year correspondence course of amateur choreography and leadership of ensembles. This was acknowledged as a master course by the state cultural and educational institutions. Between 1964 and 1973 he was a dancer and choreographer fellow at the Hungarian State Folk Ensemble. In 1969, as the folk dance facilitator of Csemadok, he established the Szőttes Chamber Folk Dance Ensemble in Pozsony, he studied at and in December 1977 graduated from the Bratislava Academy of Music and Dramatic Arts as a director and choreographer.

In 1983, he emigrated to Australia and worked as a factory stevedore in Melbourne, but as a side job, already in 1984 he established the New Szőttes Folk Dance Ensemble and with the help of the Melbourne Hungarian Community Centre he managed to run a dance school as well. Later on, he served as a lecturer in several Australian dance schools (Victorian College of the Arts, Priscilla's Character Dance School, Margaret Walker Folk Dance Centre, Blacktown Dancers). On top of this, he ran the "QUJ" Character & Folkdance Theatre, which was founded by his students. In Australia, he choreographed not only Hungarian, but also Slovak, Croatian and an Aboriginal dance ensemble.

Quittner returned to Europe and settled in Dunasziget, Hungary in 1990. He worked as a guest choreographer in the Slovak Folk Art Ensemble (SĽUK). In 1991 he was asked by Hungarian community leaders to run for the post of director of the Ifjú Szivek State Folk Ensemble. He got the position and worked here two years, until 1993. He was a guest director in Germany for the Serbian National Ensemble in 1994, meanwhile, he also serves as the art consultant for the director of the Hungarian State Folk Ensemble. He returned to Australia one year later continuing his work in the "QUJ" Character & Folkdance Theatre and began to organize and direct the Australian version of rock opera István a király (István, the King) in the C.U.B. Malthause theatre. At the end of 1996, he returned to Europe, where he directed in Germany ("Sleeping Knights", Alvó lovagok), worked on a script and directed the Legend and Message (Rege és üzenet) programme for the Gombaszög Cultural Days, as well as the "We Light a Fire, We Spread Love" (Tüzet gyújtunk, szeretetet osztunk) dance theatre production for the "Tündérrózsa" Heritage Preservation Association in Dunasziget.

He returned to Dunasziget in 2000, where he wrote his script, then directed the Millennial Village Days under the title "The Fire Must Be Kept In" (A tűznek nem szabad kialudni). The next year's fruition was "The Meeting of Hungarians From the Two Shores of the Danube" (Magyarok találkozója a Duna két partjáról), then in 2002 his task was again the programming in Gombaszög, for the Hungarian national folk festival. The idea of the musical theatre was conceived in Mosonmagyaróvár, where he directed the play titled "Divas Playing Music" (Muzsikáló dívák). On one of the main city squares in Melbourne in 2006, he organized and directed the rock ballad Pro Patria, Pro Libertate on the anniversary of the Hungarian Revolution of 1956. In 2009, they performed "The Crucified" (A Megfeszített) rock opera in the Hungarian Community Centre. After the premiere, he returned to Europe.

Quittner died on 21 June 2024, at the age of 82.

== Honours and awards ==
- At the age of 65 in 2006, he was awarded the Silver Plaque of the Slovak Republic by Deputy Prime Minister Pál Csáky.
- Deputy Prime Minister Rudolf Chmel awards the Golden Plaque of the Slovak Republic to the 70-year-old János Quittner, choreographer-director and the founder of the Szőttes Chamber Folk Dance Ensemble, as a recognition for his activities in the field of folk dance and culture spanning several decades in 2011.

== Sources ==
- Fórum Intézet
- A mozgás mestersége, 2011, Microgramma ISBN 978-80-85751-08-6
- Video DVD, Vereknyétől Melbourne-ig, 2011, Microgramma ISBN 978-80-85751-09-3
- Magyar Interaktív Televízió, 2011
