= Alexander Ruttkay =

Slovak archeologist and historian (1941–2025)

- Born: 24 April 1941; Budapest, Hungary
- Died: 14 April 2025 (aged 83)
- Scientific career
- Fields: Archaeology

Alexander Ruttkay (24 April 1941 – 14 April 2025) was a Slovak archeologist and historian. He was the head of the Archeological Institute of Slovak Academy of Science in Nitra in 1991–2008.

== Life and career ==
Ruttkay was born in Budapest, Hungary. He graduated from high school in Piešťany in 1958, then studied archeology at the Faculty of Philosophy at Comenius University in Bratislava (1958–1963). He dealt with problems of the settlement structure and historical demography, early feudal settlements in the 9th–13th century, Christianisation and the oldest religious buildings. He worked in leading positions in research and academic institutions in Czechoslovakia and Slovakia. He led a successful field research in archeological sites in Koš - Klatkej kopec, Ducové "Kostelec", Nitrianska Blatnica "Jurko", Partizánske - Šimovany, Nitra - Dražovce, etc.

Ruttkay was a member of international scientific organisations like European Academy of Sciences and Arts, Committee of International Union for Prehistoric and Protohistoric Sciences (UNESCO), German Archaeological Institute, executive committee of international castellological association Castrum Bene (president of the society, 1998–2000) and others.

Ruttkay died on 14 April 2025, at the age of 83.

== Awards ==
- Silver medal of Ľudovít Štúr, Slovak Academy of Sciences (1996)
- Gold medal of Ľudovít Štúr, Slovak Academy of Sciences (2001)
- Honorary citizen of Piešťany, Ducové and Nitrianska Blatnica
- Silver medal of Constantine the Philosopher University in Nitra (2001)
- State award 1st Class Pribina Cross (2007)
- Award of the Ministry of Education, Science, Research and Sport for life-work (2011)
- Award of town Nitra (2011)
- Premium of Literary Fund, Section for scientific and professional literature and computer programs for the development of science Slovakia and abroad ( 2012)

== Sources ==
- "Curriculum Vitae Alexander Ruttkay" (PDF) (in Slovak). Slovak Academy of Sciences.
- "Curriculum Vitae Alexander Ruttkay (short version)" (in Slovak). Slovak Academy of Sciences.
