= Pavol Zelenay =

Slovak composer, producer, and musician (1928–2024)

- Born: 15 April 1928; Zohor, Czechoslovakia
- Died: 8 July 2024 (aged 96)
- Known for: Co-founder of the Bratislavská lýra festival

Pavol Zelenay (15 April 1928 – 8 July 2024) was a Slovak swing composer, producer, musician, and music critic who was best known as a co-founder of the Bratislavská lýra popular song contest.

== Biography ==
Pavol Zelenay was born on 15 April 1928 in the village of Zohor in the Malacky District to Emil Zelenay, a lawyer, and Magdaléna (née Križanová). He was the oldest of four children. Already during his studies at the grammar school in Piešťany, he was a member of the student band called Tiger Jazz Band.

After high school, he enrolled in the construction engineering program at the Slovak University of Technology in Bratislava while simultaneously studying clarinet play. In 1950 he recorded his first song at the Slovenský rozhlas studios. Between 1967 and 1984, Zelenay was the head of the popular music department at the Slovenský rozhlas, where he played a crucial role in providing platform for new bands and starting musicians. He was the producer of the first Slovak rock album Zvonky zvoňte by the Prúdy band. In 1990 he retired from the Slovenský rozhlas but continued his work as an external contributor.

In 1966, Zelenay and the musician Ján Siváček established the Bratislavská lýra festival, inspired by the example of the Sanremo Music Festival. The festival helped to launch the careers of future starts of Slovak pop music, including Elán, Modus and Marika Gombitová.

== Death ==
Zelenay died on 8 July 2024, at the age of 96.

== Awards ==
In 2011, Zelenay was awarded the Order of Ľudovít Štúr, 3rd class by the president of Slovakia Ivan Gašparovič for his lifelong contribution to development of Slovak music. In 2011 he was introduced into the Hall of Fame of Slovak pop music.
