= 2025 Spišská Stará Ves school stabbing =

School stabbing in Spišská Stará Ves, Slovakia

Spišska Stará Ves school stabbing
- Location: 49.3792°N 20.3608°E; Gymnázium, Spišská Stará Ves, Prešov, Slovakia
- Date: 16 January 2025 c.13:00 (CET)
- Attack type: Mass stabbing, misogynist terrorism
- Weapon: Tactical knife
- Deaths: 2
- Injuries: 1
- Perpetrator: Samuel Straško
- Motive: Misogyny

On 16 January 2025, a stabbing took place at a high school in Spišská Stará Ves, a small town in Slovakia near the border with Poland. An 18-year-old student fatally stabbed a teacher and a fellow student, with one other person injured. The culprit was arrested after the stabbing.

== Background ==
School attacks are rare in Slovakia. In 2020 a 22-year-old student killed the deputy principal of his former high school and injured five other people and, in 2022, a student injured a classmate by attacking her with a knife at a high school in Nováky. International media also noted that the attack came just several months after the attempted assassination of the prime minister Robert Fico.

== Stabbing ==
The stabbing took place at a gymnasium on Štúrová street in Spišská Stará Ves on 16 January 2025. At about 12:40 p.m. Samuel Straško, an 18-year-old student of the school who studied individually due to a history of violence and harassment against other students, came to the office of the assistant principal Mária Semančíková, where he was due to take an exam. The student, who was dressed all in black and wearing a black ski mask, used a tactical knife to stab the assistant principal to death. Afterwards, he continued to the classroom, where he had attended classes before being assigned individual study plan and attacked an 18-year-old female student. Another student came to the defense of the victim but was injured by Straško, who later chased down and killed his original target.

After the stabbing, the perpetrator fled the scene. The police warned the locals about an armed man being on the loose in town and cautioned residents not to approach him. He was arrested about an hour after the stabbing in a forest near the nearby village of Matiašovce.

== Perpetrator ==
The perpetrator, Samuel Straško was an 18-year-old student of the high school in Spišská Stará Ves, who resided in the nearby village of Ľubica. As a student, he excelled academically and athletically, having successfully participated in mathematics and German language competitions as well as various sports tournaments. At the same time, he had a long history of verbal and physical attacks against female classmates and was previously expelled from high schools in Lučenec and Kežmarok for repeated violent incidents.

The most severe incident happened in late 2021, when Staško attacked a female classmate with his fists; her injuries required medical attention. In February 2022, he received a suspended sentence of four months in prison. He was also sentenced for threatening another female classmate with death, but not given any additional sentence because the judge considered the suspended sentence issued in the other case sufficient.

In Spišská Stará Ves, the pattern of violent behavior continued. Straško was removed from an online classroom during the COVID-19 pandemic for sending death threats to a female classmate. He later attacked the classmate by crashing his bike into her on purpose and threatened another female student with murder on a school trip. Due to his violent behavior, the school assigned Straško to an individual study plan, where he studied at home and attended regular exams at the school.

According to his fellow students and teachers, Straško was an intelligent but troubled student. In addition to repeated outbursts of aggression towards other students, particularly female ones, he was known for speaking German and performing the Hitler salute during school breaks. He repeatedly expressed hatred towards Romani people and women. He also actively sought sadistic content online.

== Investigation ==
The prosecutor general Maroš Žilinka stated immediately after the stabbing that the perpetrator was "not a tabula rasa", likely referring to his previous violent incidents.

Immediately after his arrest, Straško confessed he wanted to kill two other persons in addition to the two victims. He attributed his actions to the alleged conspiracy of the targeted persons to expel him from school and generally ruin his life. According to Marek Madro, a psychologist who talked to Straško and other students after the stabbing, the perpetrator was additionally motivated by his hatred of women.

Samuel Straško was accused of first-degree murder as the police deemed his knife attacks premediated and intentional. The judge refused Straško's lawyer please for a parole and ruled the perpetrator will remain in jail for the duration of the trial. After attempted suicide by hanging in prison, Straško was transferred to a hospital in Trenčín, where he unsuccessfully attempted suicide again.

== Legal proceedings ==
On 30 September 2026, Straško was sentenced to 25 years in a maximum security prison and outpatient psychiatric treatment and protective supervision for three years.

== Aftermath ==
The interior minister Matúš Šutaj Eštok and education minister Tomáš Drucker immediately traveled to Spišská Stará Ves by a helicopter offer condolences and support to the local authorities.

In direct response to the stabbing, the national chief of police as well as the chief of police in Spišská Stará Ves were fired by the interior minister Matúš Šutaj Eštok. According to Šutaj Eštok, the local police failed to take necessary steps to prevent the stabbing from happening. Later, the chief of police inspectorate explained, the school had asked the police to investigate the behavior of Straško a couple of days prior to the stabbing. Nonetheless, the police did not find any crime to be investigated and considered the case "ordinary bullying".

Anna Kromková, the principal of the high school where the stabbing took place, blamed the parents of the perpetrator for withholding information about his prior violent conduct. According to the principal, the school would never have accept the student transfer had it known about Straško's past.

Hundreds of people attended the funeral mass for the stabbed assistant school principal celebrated by the local bishop František Trstenský.

=== Statements ===
The president of Slovakia Peter Pellegrini, prime minister Robert Fico, the opposition leader Michal Šimečka, numerous government ministers and MPs from all parties as well as the governor of the Prešov Region Milan Majerský immediately condemned the stabbing and offered their condolences to the families of the victimes.

Pope Francis also offered his condolences via the papal nuncio Nicola Girasoli. The head of Conference of Slovak Bishops Bernard Bober, also expressed his "spiritual closeness" after the attack.

In a statement, the Slovak student union said "Schools should be a place where young people grow, learn and dream of a better future. Instead, we are witnessing violence and hatred finding their way into our classrooms".

== See also ==
- Vrútky school stabbing
- Attempted assassination of Robert Fico
