= Jozef Gruska =

Slovak computer scientist (1933–2025)

Jozef Gruska (11 December 1933 – 14 December 2025) was a Slovak computer scientist and academic.

== Life and career ==
Gruska was born in Rabčice on 11 December 1933. In 1965, he defended his doctorate at the Slovak Academy of Sciences in Bratislava with a thesis entitled Structural Uniqueness of Formal Languages. From 1968 to 1970, he completed an internship at the University of Minnesota in Minneapolis. After that, he worked for 17 years (1968–1985) as a researcher at the Research Centre of University Research in Bratislava and a researcher at the Slovak Academy of Sciences.

From 1990 to 1993, he was a visiting professor at the University of Hamburg, he then returned to Bratislava as a researcher at the Slovak Academy of Sciences. He was the founder of the IFIP working group for theoretical computer science and was its head from 1989 to 1996.

In 1997, he was awarded the gold medal of Masaryk University in Brno.

From 1997, he was a professor at Masaryk University in Brno, and from 1997 to 1999 he worked as a visiting professor at the Université de Nice Sophia in France. In 2000, he focused on quantum computing and organized a number of Asian conferences on this topic (e.g. EQIS in 2003). From 2007 to 2010, he was an elected member of the board of the Academia Europaea based in London.

Gruska died on 14 December 2025, at the age of 92.
