= Jaroslav Kubečka =

Slovak politician (1934–2025)

Minister of Economy
- In office 19 March 1993 – 10 November 1993
- Preceded by: Ľudovít Černák
- Succeeded by: Ján Ducký

Minister of Economy of the Czechoslovak Socialist Republic
- In office 2 July 1992 – 31 December 1992
- Preceded by: Vladimír Dlouhý
- Succeeded by: position abolished

Personal details
- Born: 27 October 1934; Turá Lúka, Czechoslovakia
- Died: 19 April 2025 (aged 90)
- Political party: HZDS
- Education: University of Economics in Bratislava
- Occupation: Economist

Jaroslav Kubečka (27 October 1934 – 19 April 2025) was a Slovak politician. A member of the Movement for a Democratic Slovakia, he served as the last Minister of Economy of the Czechoslovak Socialist Republic from July to December 1992 and was Minister of Economy of Slovakia from March to November 1993.

== Biography ==
Jaroslav Kubečka was born on 27 October 1934 in the village of Turá Lúka, which became a part of the town of Myjava in the 1980s. In 1958 he graduated from the Bratislava University of Economics and Business. He entered politics in 1989. Between 1990 and 1992, he served as Deputy Minister of Industry and later Deputy Minister of Economy in the governments of Milan Čič, Vladimír Mečiar, and Ján Čarnogurský. In 1992, he was nominated by the Movement for a Democratic Slovakia (HZDS) party to the federal government of Czechoslovakia as Minister of Economy and was also tasked with overseeing the Ministry for Strategic Planning. After the dissolution of Czechoslovakia, he became the first Minister of Economy of the independent Slovak Republic (from March to November 1993).

== Death ==
Kubečka died on 19 April 2025, at the age of 90.
