= Staškov =

- Municipality
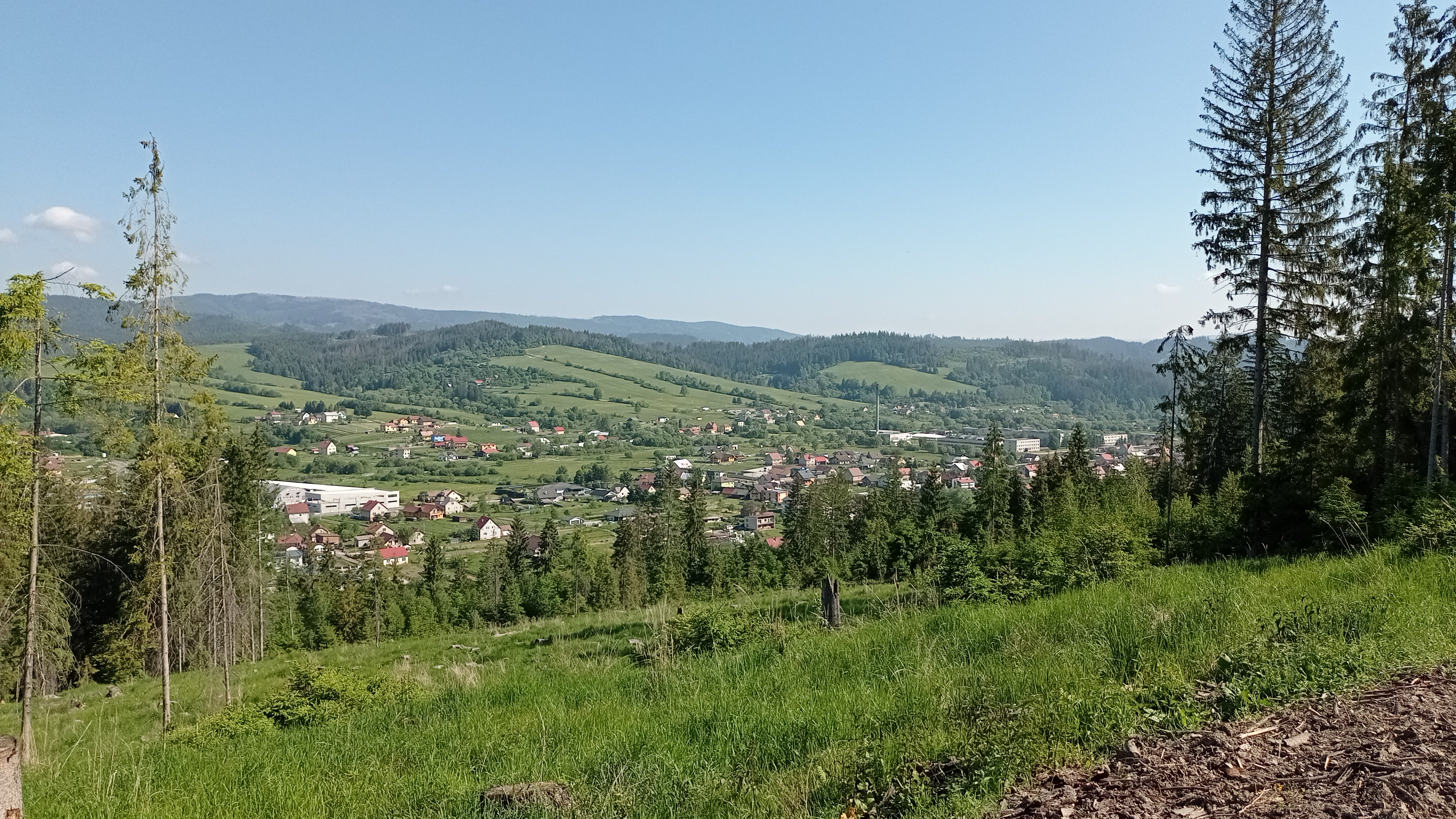

- Flag

- Location of Staškov in the Žilina Region Location of Staškov in Slovakia
- Coordinates: 49.42°N 18.70°E
- Country: Slovakia
- Region: Žilina Region
- District: Čadca District
- First mentioned: 1658

Area
  - Total: 21.85 km^{2} (8.44 sq mi)
- Elevation: 444 m (1,457 ft)

Population (2025)
  - Total: 2,754
- Time zone: UTC+1 (CET)
  - Summer (DST): UTC+2 (CEST)
- Postal code: 235 3
- Area code: +421 41
- Vehicle registration plate (until 2022): CA
- Website: www.staskov.sk/sk/

Staškov (Hungarian: Szaniszlófalva, until 1899 Sztaskó) is a village and municipality in Čadca District in the Žilina Region of northern Slovakia.

== History ==
In historical records the village was first mentioned in 1640.

== Geography ==
The municipality lies at an altitude of 444 metres (1,457 ft) and covers an area of 21.85 km^{2} (8.44 sq mi) (2025).

== Population ==
Population statistic (10 years)
Year	1995	2005	2015	2025
Count	2595	2706	2765	2754
Difference		+4.27%	+2.18%	−0.39%

Population statistic
Year	2024	2025
Count	2759	2754
Difference		−0.18%

It has a population of 2754 people (31 December 2025).

=== Ethnicity ===
Census 2021 (1+ %)
Ethnicity	Number	Fraction
Slovak	2652	95.94%
Not found out	104	3.76%
Czech	38	1.37%
Total	2764	

In year 2021 was 2764 people by ethnicity 2652 as Slovak, 104 as Not found out, 38 as Czech, 9 as Other, 6 as German, 3 as Russian, 3 as Polish, 2 as Korean and 1 as Rusyn.

Note on population: The difference values of population numbers in the table "Population statistic" and in the sections "Ethnicity" & "Religion" is caused by the use of various statistical methods.

=== Religion ===
Census 2021 (1+ %)
Religion	Number	Fraction
Roman Catholic Church	2413	87.3%
None	175	6.33%
Not found out	101	3.65%
Total	2764	

In year 2021 was 2764 people by religion 2413 from Roman Catholic Church, 175 from None, 101 from Not found out, 27 from Greek Catholic Church, 12 from Christian Congregations in Slovakia, 11 from Other, 9 from Evangelical Church, 5 from Ad hoc movements, 3 from Other and not ascertained christian church, 2 from Calvinist Church, 2 from Buddhism, 1 from Old Catholic Church, 1 from Jehovah's Witnesses, 1 from Hinduism and 1 from Seventh-day Adventist Church.

== Famous people ==
- Jozef Kroner, Slovak actor
