= Slovak National Uprising Anniversary =

Public holiday in Slovakia

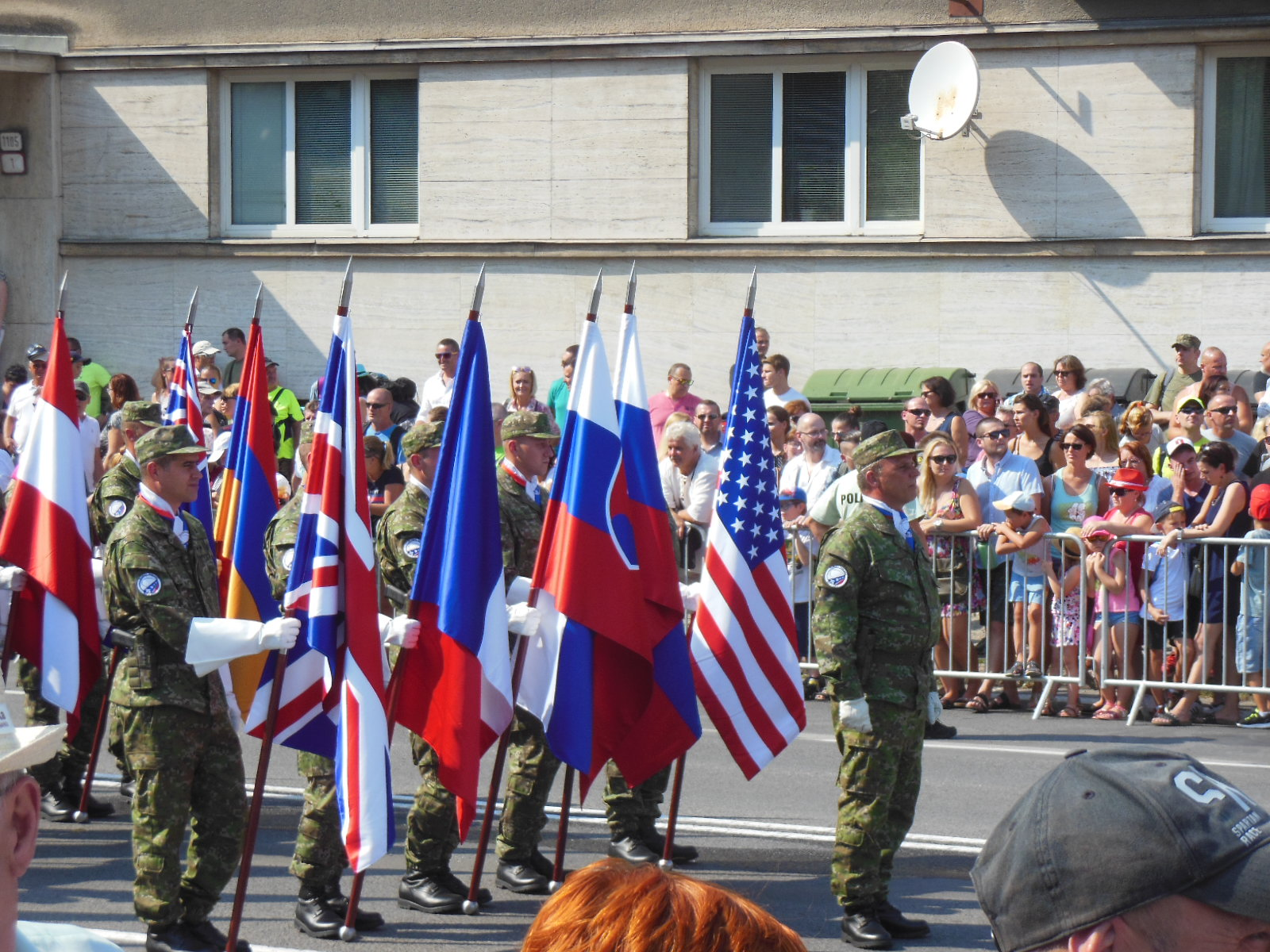
A flag party during the parade.

Slovak National Uprising Anniversary (Slovak: Výročie Slovenského národného povstania) is a public holiday celebrated annually in Slovakia on 29 August to commemorates the anniversary of the allied victory in the Slovak National Uprising during World War II. It honors those from Democratic Party, the Czech Social Democratic Party and the Communist Party of Slovakia who took part in the Slovak resistance movement against rule from Nazi Germany.

== Holiday history ==
This date was chosen in 2003. On 29 August, wreaths are placed on a memorial to the Slovak National Uprising in Bratislava. The anniversary is also celebrated in the city of Banska Bystrica. Some of the largest celebrations were held in 2019, on the occasion of the 75th anniversary, which included a military parade of the Slovak Armed Forces, an official visit of Czech Prime Minister Andrej Babiš and the release of a documentary film called Leaving. While it is often seen as a celebration of Anti-fascism, it is also seen as having a strong connotation with the Czechoslovak Socialist Republic and its communist system. As a result, many politicians steer clear of associating themselves with the holiday. Many far-right groups and catholic nationalists actively condemn the uprising and its commemoration in public speeches.

== See also ==
- Liberation Day (Ukraine)
- Independence Day (Belarus)
- Liberation Day (Hungary)
