= Academy of Fine Arts and Design, Bratislava =

Educational institution in Slovakia

Coordinates: 48.1416°N 17.1072°E

- Vysoká škola výtvarných umení v Bratislave (VŠVU)
- Established: 9 June 1949
- Rector: Bohunka Koklesová
- Location: Bratislava, Slovakia
- Website: www.vsvu.sk

The Academy of Fine Arts and Design, Bratislava (AFAD; Slovak: Vysoká škola výtvarných umení v Bratislave, VŠVU) is an academy in Bratislava, Slovakia.

It was founded in 1949 at the dawn of totalitarian regime in the former Czechoslovak Socialist Republic. For next forty years, the institution was under the pressure of political doctrine promoting so-called socialist realism in arts, as well as suffering the political purges affecting badly the whole society. In spite of troubled historical development and atmosphere of repression, at AFAD there were few spheres of so-called "positive deviation". The resistance to the orthodoxy of socialist realism was made possible thanks to the intellectual and artistic background of some of the professors and their personal approach to their students. After years of totalitarianism, in 1989 the AFAD was one of the few higher education institutions in the country where the whole teaching staff was re-selected in an open competition. Since then many changes in educational profile and academic life of students and faculty had been taking place. As a result, today the AFAD is a present—day oriented school offering study in three levels (bachelor, master and doctoral) and five specific fields: Fine Arts, Design, Architecture, Restoration, and Theory and History of Arts.

== Departments ==
Architecture; Photography and New Media; Printmaking and Other Media; Intermedia and Multimedia; Painting and Other Media; Design; Restoration; Sculpture, Object, Installation; Theory and History of Art; Textiles; Applied Art; Visual Communication; Division of Drawing

== Courses ==
Standard study in BA level: (8 semesters); MA level (4 semesters); doctoral level (min. 6 semesters); Standard study at AFAD is offered only in Slovak. Successful student is awarded the Diploma and the title “Bachelor of Arts” Bc. (equivalent to Bachelor of Fine Arts, BFA), “Master of Art” MFA (equivalent to Master of Fine Arts, MFA), “artis doctor” Art D., and “philosophiae doctor” PhD. To be accepted the student must pass a highly competitive admission exam based on art practice creative work carried out during the examination and the language / theory / art history knowledge tests. Application procedure for students wishing to study at AFAD varies according to the level of study.
