= 2011 in Slovakia =

- Decades: 1990s; 2000s; 2010s; 2020s
- See also: Other events of 2011; History of Slovakia • Years

Events in the year 2011 in Slovakia.

== Incumbents ==
- President – Ivan Gašparovič
- Prime minister – Iveta Radičová
- Speaker of the National Council – Richard Sulík, Pavol Hrušovský

== Events ==
- 28 December – The 2011 Kosice McDonald's bombing.

=== Film ===
- 14 April – Apricot Island released
- 7 July – Gypsy released.
- 13 October – Lóve released

== Notable deaths ==
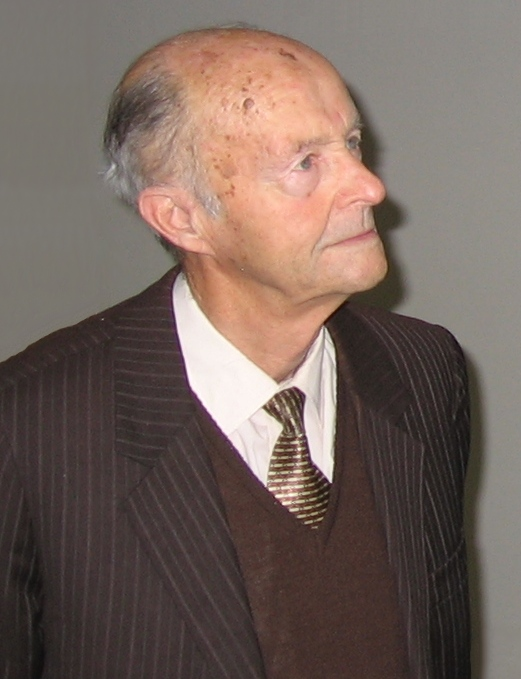
Milan Mišík

- 20 January – Vladimír Kompánek, sculptor and painter (born 1927)
- 7 May – Milan Mišík, geologist (born 1928)
- 27 July – Rudolf Baláž, bishop (born 1940).
- 18 december – Václav Havel.
