= 2016 in Slovakia =

- Decades: 1990s; 2000s; 2010s; 2020s
- See also: Other events of 2016; History of Slovakia • Years

Events in the year 2016 in Slovakia.

== Incumbents ==
- President – Andrej Kiska (Independent)
- Prime Minister – Robert Fico (Smer-SD)
- Speaker of the National Council – Peter Pellegrini (Smer-SD)

== Events ==
- 25-31 January – The 2016 European Figure Skating Championships was hosted in Bratislava
- 5 March – The Slovak parliamentary election, 2016
- 30 November - Slovak parliament passed a bill that requires all religious movements and organizations to have a minimum of 50,000 verified practicing members in order to become state-recognized up from 20,000. it is wildly seen as toughens church registration rules to bar Islam.

== Notable deaths ==
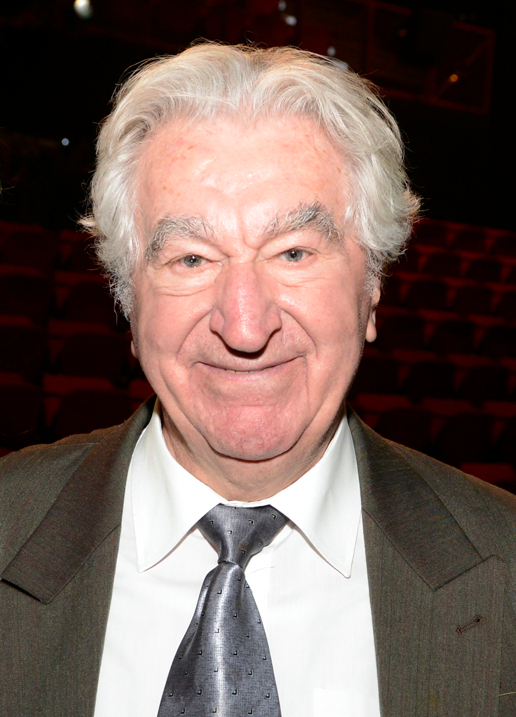
Anton Srholec

- 7 January: Anton Srholec, 86, Salesian priest.
- 16 August: Gabriela Hermélyová, 92, swing musician.
- 9 September:Augustín Marián Húska, 86, politician
