= Milan Hort =

Slovak politician

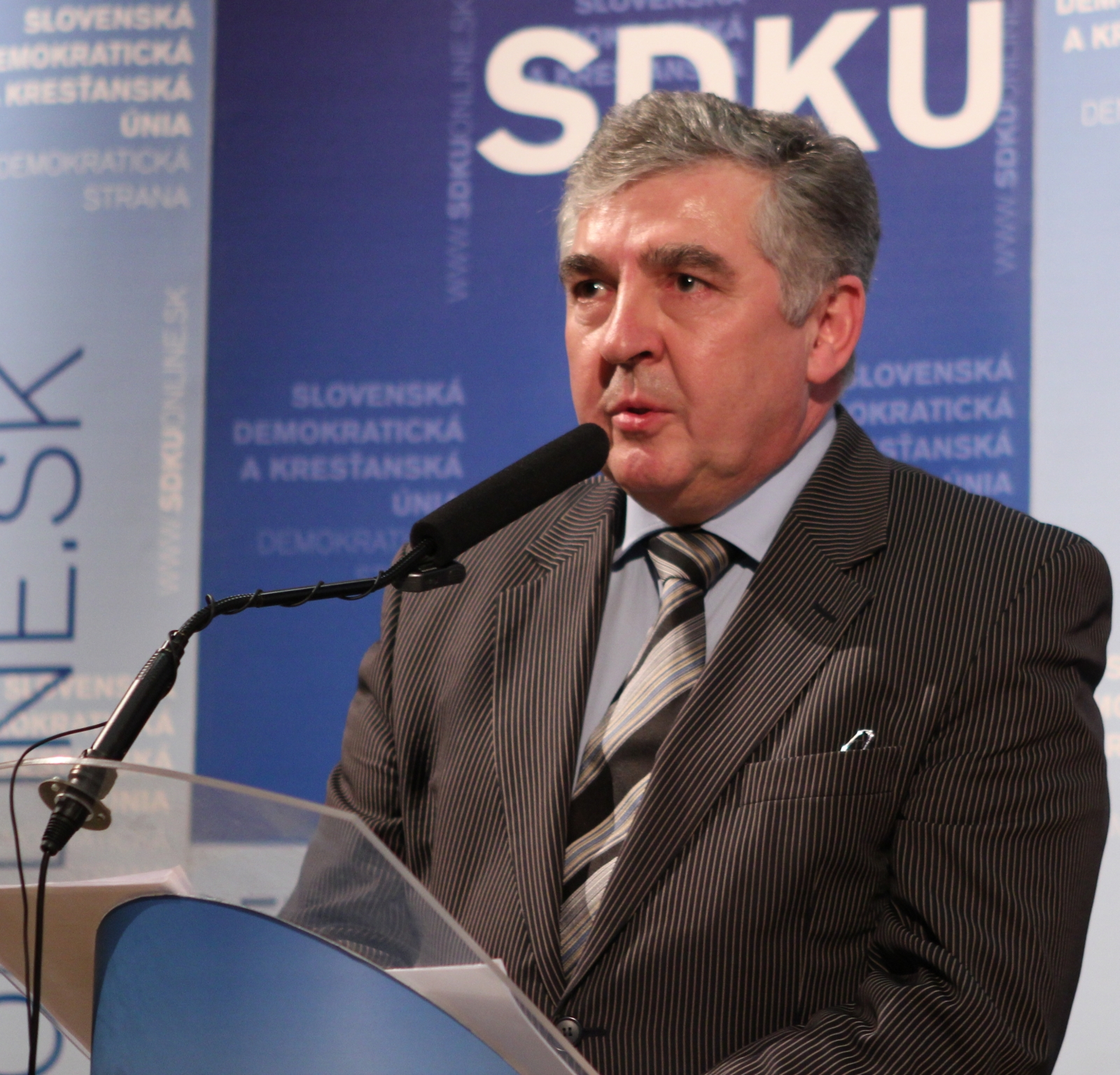

Deputy Speaker of the National Council
- In office 4 July 2006 – 4 April 2012 Serving with Anna Belousovová, Miroslav Číž, Béla Bugár, Pavol Hrušovský, Robert Fico
- Speaker: Pavol Paška; Richard Sulík; Pavol Hrušovský

Member of the National Council
- In office 29 October 1998 – 4 April 2012

Personal details
- Born: 6 February 1953 (age 73) Červený Kameň, Czechoslovakia
- Party: Christian Democratic Movement; Slovak Democratic Coalition; Slovak Democratic and Christian Union – Democratic Party
- Children: 5
- Education: University of Economics in Bratislava

Milan Hort (born 6 February 1953) is a Slovak politician. He served as a Member of the National Council from 1998 to 2010 and its Deputy Speaker from 2006 to 2012.

Hort was born in Červený Kameň and studied International Commerce at the University of Economics in Bratislava. After graduation, Hort worked in sales at the ZŤS factory in Dubnica nad Váhom. Following the Velvet Revolution, Hort became a member of the Christian Democratic Movement and was elected the mayor of Nová Dubnica.

In 1998 he joined the Slovak Democratic Coalition party, which he represented, along with his successor Slovak Democratic and Christian Union – Democratic Party in the parliament for 12 years. From 2006, until the end of his parliamentary career he served as a Deputy Speaker.

In the 2023 Slovak parliamentary election, Hort was the largest donor of the Modrí party, contributing 500,000 eur to the unsuccessful campaign.

Hort is married and has five children.
