= 2012 in Slovakia =

- Decades: 1990s; 2000s; 2010s; 2020s
- See also: Other events of 2012; History of Slovakia • Years

Events in the year 2012 in Slovakia.

== Incumbents ==
- President – Ivan Gašparovič
- Prime Minister – Iveta Radičová, Robert Fico
- Speaker of the National Council – Pavol Hrušovský, Pavol Paška

== Events ==
- 10 March – Slovak parliamentary election, 2012

== Notable deaths ==
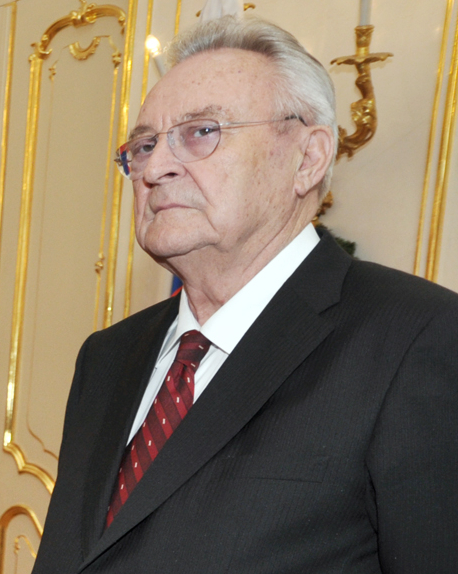
Milan Čič

- 11 January – Bohumil Golián, volleyball player (born 1931).
- 16 August – Bystrík Režucha, conductor (born 1935)
- 9 October – Elo Romančík, actor (born 1922)
- 9 November – Milan Čič, lawyer and politician, Prime Minister of the Slovak Socialist Republic from 1989 to 1990 (born 1932).
