= 2015 in Slovakia =

- Decades: 1990s; 2000s; 2010s; 2020s
- See also: Other events of 2015; History of Slovakia • Years

The following lists events that happened during 2015 in Slovakia.

== Incumbents ==
=== Head of State ===
2015 is the first full year of the 4th President Andrej Kiska, elected as an independent candidate in the 2014.

- President – Andrej Kiska (Independent)

=== Government ===
2015 is the last full year of the 8th National Council. Next parliamentary elections will be held on or before 5 March 2016. The Robert Fico's Second Cabinet, elected in 2012 consisted solely from Direction – Social Democracy party (Slovak: Smer – sociálna demokracia, abbreviated Smer-SD), continues.

- Speaker of the National Council – Peter Pellegrini (Smer-SD)
- Prime Minister – Robert Fico (Smer-SD)
- Minister of Foreign Affairs – Miroslav Lanjčák (Independent)
- Minister of Interior – Robert Kaliňák (Smer-SD)
- Minister of Finance – Peter Kažimír (Smer-SD)
- Minister of Defence – Martin Glváč (Smer-SD)

=== Major parties' leaders ===
Parties in National Council

- Direction – Social Democracy (Slovak: Smer – sociálna demokracia, abbreviated Smer-SD) – Robert Fico
- Christian Democratic Movement (Slovak: Kresťanskodemokratické hnutie, abbreviated KDH) – Ján Figeľ
- Ordinary People and Independent Personalities (Slovak: Obyčajní Ľudia a nezávislé osobnosti, abbreviated OĽaNO) – Igor Matovič
- Most–Híd – Béla Bugár
- Slovak Democratic and Christian Union – Democratic Party (Slovak: Slovenská demokratická a kresťanská únia – Demokratická strana, abbreviated SDKÚ-DS) – Pavol Frešo
- Freedom and Solidarity (Slovak: Sloboda a Solidarita, abbreviated SaS) – Richard Sulík

Major extra-parliamentary parties

- Network (Slovak: SIEŤ) – Radoslav Procházka
- Slovak Civic Coalition (Slovak: Slovenská občianska koalícia, abbreviated SKOK!) – Juraj Miškov
- Slovak National Party (Slovak: Slovenská národná strana, abbreviated SNS) – Andrej Danko
- Party of the Hungarian Community (Slovak & Hungarian: Strana maďarskej komunity – Magyar Közösség Pártja, abbreviated SMK-MKP) – József Berényi

=== Other state leading representatives ===
- Head of the Constitutional Court of Slovakia – Ivetta Macejková

=== Chairpersons of Self-governing Regions ===
- Bratislava Self-governing Region – Pavol Frešo (coalition of SDKÚ-DS, KDH, Most–Híd, SMK-MKP, OKS, SaS, SZ)
- Trnava Self-governing Region – Tibor Mikuš (Independent)
- Trenčín Self-governing Region – Jaroslav Baška (Smer-SD)
- Nitra Self-governing Region – Milan Belica (coalition of Smer-SD, SNS, ASV)
- Banská Bystrica Self-governing Region – Marian Kotleba (ĽSNS)
- Žilina Self-governing Region – Juraj Blanár (coalition of HZD, SNS, Smer-SD)
- Košice Self-governing Region – Zdenko Trebuľa (Smer-SD)
- Prešov Self-governing Region – Peter Chudík (coalition of Smer-SD, HZD, SNS)

== Events ==
=== January ===
- January 1 – President Andrej Kiska in his New Year's speech stressed need to fight corruption, need for political activism, reducing bureaucracy. Kiska also described situation in Ukraine as a breach of Ukrainian territorial sovereignty and interference with the political independence of the country.
- January 27 – 46th Session of the National Council (to February 13)

=== February ===
- February 1 – Regulation No. 1 of 2015 of the Slovak Republic Ministry of Interior on granting state citizenship of the Slovak Republic for specific reasons came into force. The regulation allows granting the citizenship to former Slovakia's citizens who lost citizenship after January 1, 1993, including those, who lost citizenship due to acquisition of foreign country's citizenship, under the Act No. 250/2010 Coll. of laws Amending and Supplementing the Act No. 40/1993 on State Citizenship
- February 7 – 2015 Slovak same-sex marriage referendum failed with only 21.4% of citizens casting a vote
- February 18 – 47th Session of the National Council

== Deaths ==
=== January ===
- 1 January – Drahoslav Machala, writer and journalist (b. 1947)
- 2 January – Arpád Račko, sculptor (b. 1930)

=== February ===
- 1 February – Martin Ťapák, film director, actor, dancer and choreographer (b. 1926)
- 15 February – Michal Benčík, lawyer, politician of former Communist Party of Czechoslovakia and later Party of the Democratic Left, member of Czechoslovak Federal Assembly and Slovak National Council (b. 1932)

=== March ===
- 15 March – Ján Kulich, sculptor (b. 1930)
- 15 March – Marián Mikluš, army major-general and Chief of the General Staff in 1998 (b. 1953)
- 22 March – Peter Pišťanek, writer (b. 1960)
- 26 March – Kornel Földvári, poet, journalist, art and literature critic and translator (b. 1932)
- 27 March – Martin Porubjak, college professor, dramaturge, playwright, theater and film scriptwriter and director (b. 1944)
- 29 March – Ivan Niňaj, sports commentator (b. 1954)

=== April ===
- 11 April – Braňo Hochel, writer, university associate professor, literary scholar, translator and politician of Democratic Party (b. 1951)
- 26 April – Pavol Sedláček, medical doctor, politician of former People's Party – Movement for a Democratic Slovakia and Chairman of Trenčín Self-governing Region in 2006–2013 (b. 1949)
