= 2018 in Slovakia =

- Decades: 1990s; 2000s; 2010s; 2020s
- See also: Other events of 2018; History of Slovakia • Years

Events in the year 2018 in Slovakia.

== Incumbents ==
- President – Andrej Kiska (Independent)
- Prime Minister – Robert Fico (Smer-SD) (until 22 March), Peter Pellegrini (Direction–SSD) (starting 22 March)
- Speaker of the National Council – Andrej Danko

== Events ==
- 21 February – Murder of Ján Kuciak
- 10 November – 2018 Slovak local elections
- 20 November – Minister of Foreign Affairs Miroslav Lajčák announced that he would contemplate his resignation if the parliament rejected the Global Compact for Migration.
- 25 November – Prime Minister Peter Pellegrini says Slovakia will not support the Global Compact for Migration. Slovakia joins with Hungary in its opposition to the Global Compact for Migration.
- 29 November – The Slovak parliament votes 90-15 against the Global Compact for Migration.
  - after the parliament had voted to refuse the compact, Miroslav Lajčák the Foreign Affairs Minister decided to resign, but later withdrew his resignation.

=== Sports ===
- 9 to 25 February – Slovakia participated at the 2018 Winter Olympics in PyeongChang, South Korea, with 56 competitors in 7 sports

== Deaths ==
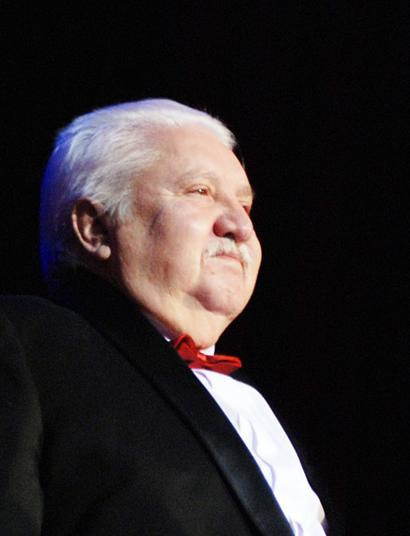
Marián Labuda

- 5 January – Marián Labuda, 73, actor..
- 10 March - Pavol Minárik, 60, politician.
- 18 March – Michal Horský, 74, political scientist and politician.
- 6 April – Pavol Paška, 60, politician.
- 23 April – Vladimír Weiss, 78, footballer.
