= 2019 in Slovakia =

- Decades: 1990s; 2000s; 2010s; 2020s
- See also: Other events of 2019; History of Slovakia • Years

Events in the year 2019 in Slovakia.

== Incumbents ==
- President – Andrej Kiska (Independent) (until 15 June), Zuzana Čaputová (Independent) (starting 15 June)
- Prime Minister – Peter Pellegrini
- Speaker of the National Council – Andrej Danko

== Events ==
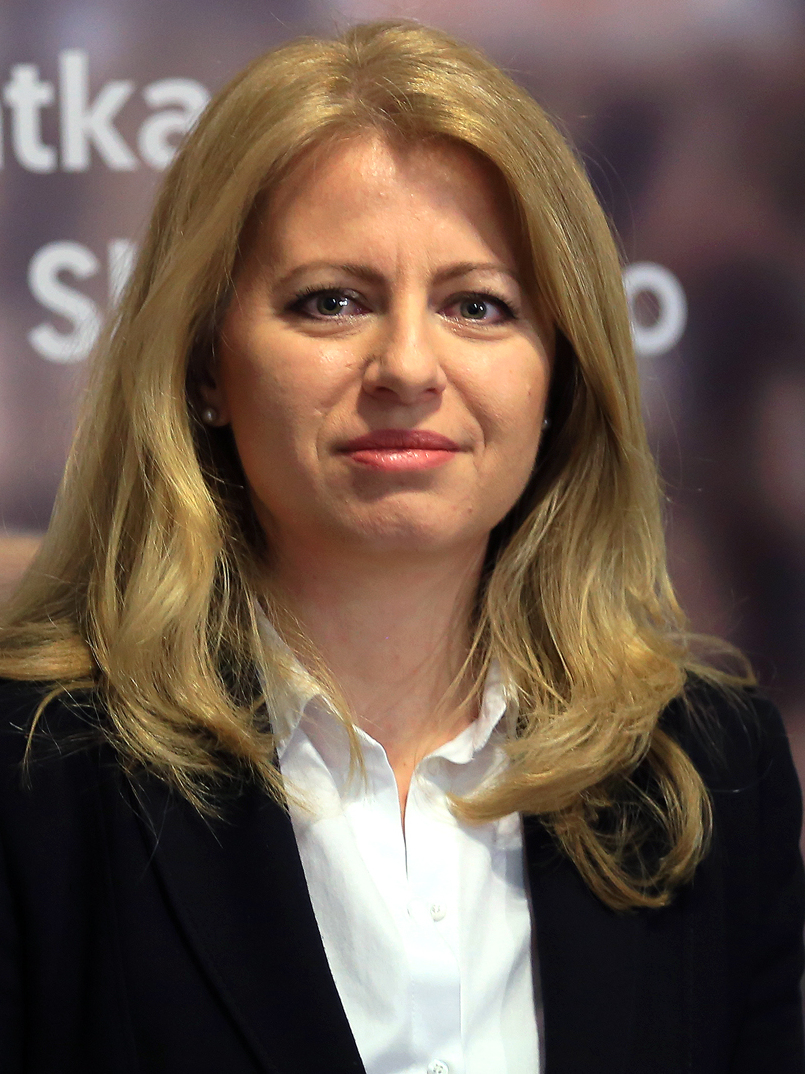
Zuzana Čaputová, first female president in Slovakia

- 16 March — Scheduled date for the 2019 Slovak presidential election
- 30 March — Zuzana Čaputová is elected president, the first female president in Slovakia's history.
- 29 April — The Supreme Court of the Slovak Republic rejects a motion to dissolve the far-right Nationalist People's Party Our Slovakia.

== Deaths ==
- 13 February – Miroslav Kusý, 87, political scientist
- 20 April – Peter Colotka, 94, academic, lawyer and politician, former Prime Minister
- 9 November – Jozef Tuchyňa, 77, general and politician

== See also ==
- 2019 European Parliament election
