= 2013 in Slovakia =

- Decades: 1990s; 2000s; 2010s; 2020s
- See also: Other events of 2013; History of Slovakia • Years

Events in the year 2013 in Slovakia.

== Incumbents ==
- President – Ivan Gašparovič
- Prime Minister – Robert Fico (Smer-SD)
- Speaker of the National Council – Pavol Paška (Smer-SD)

== Events ==
- 10 February – First occurrence of the television series Česko Slovenská SuperStar 2013
- 6–12 May – The tennis tournament 2013 Empire Slovak Open took place in Trnava.
- 25 November – Marian Kotleba of People's Party Our Slovakia wins the election of Governor of Banská Bystrica Region. Kotleba's win was described as a "shock" by political analysts, who attributed it to deep anti-Romani sentiments in the region.

== Notable deaths ==
- 28 January – Ladislav Pavlovič, football player (born 1926)
- 1 July – Ján Zlocha, football player (born 1942).
- 7 September – Marek Špilár, football player (born 1975)
- 21 September – Peter Solan, film director (born 1929)
