= 2010 in Slovakia =

- Decades: 1990s; 2000s; 2010s; 2020s
- See also: Other events of 2010; History of Slovakia • Years

Events in the year 2010 in Slovakia.

== Incumbents ==
- President – Ivan Gašparovič
- Prime Minister – Robert Fico, Iveta Radičová
- Speaker of the National Council – Pavol Paška, Richard Sulík

== Events ==
- 12 June – Parliamentary election
- 30 August – The 2010 Bratislava shooting
- 18 September – Slovak political reform referendum, 2010

== Notable deaths ==
- 9 September – Peter Dzúrik, football player (born 1968)
- 25 September – Zoltán Pálkovács, judoka (born 1981).
