= 2021 in Slovakia =

- Decades: 2000s; 2010s; 2020s
- See also: Other events of 2021; History of Slovakia • Years

Events in the year 2021 in Slovakia.

== Incumbents ==
- President: Zuzana Čaputová
- Prime Minister:
  - Igor Matovič (until 1 April)
  - Eduard Heger (from 1 April)

== Events ==
Ongoing — COVID-19 pandemic in Slovakia

- 21 to 26 September – 2021 ICF Canoe Slalom World Championships, to be held in the Bratislava.

== Deaths ==
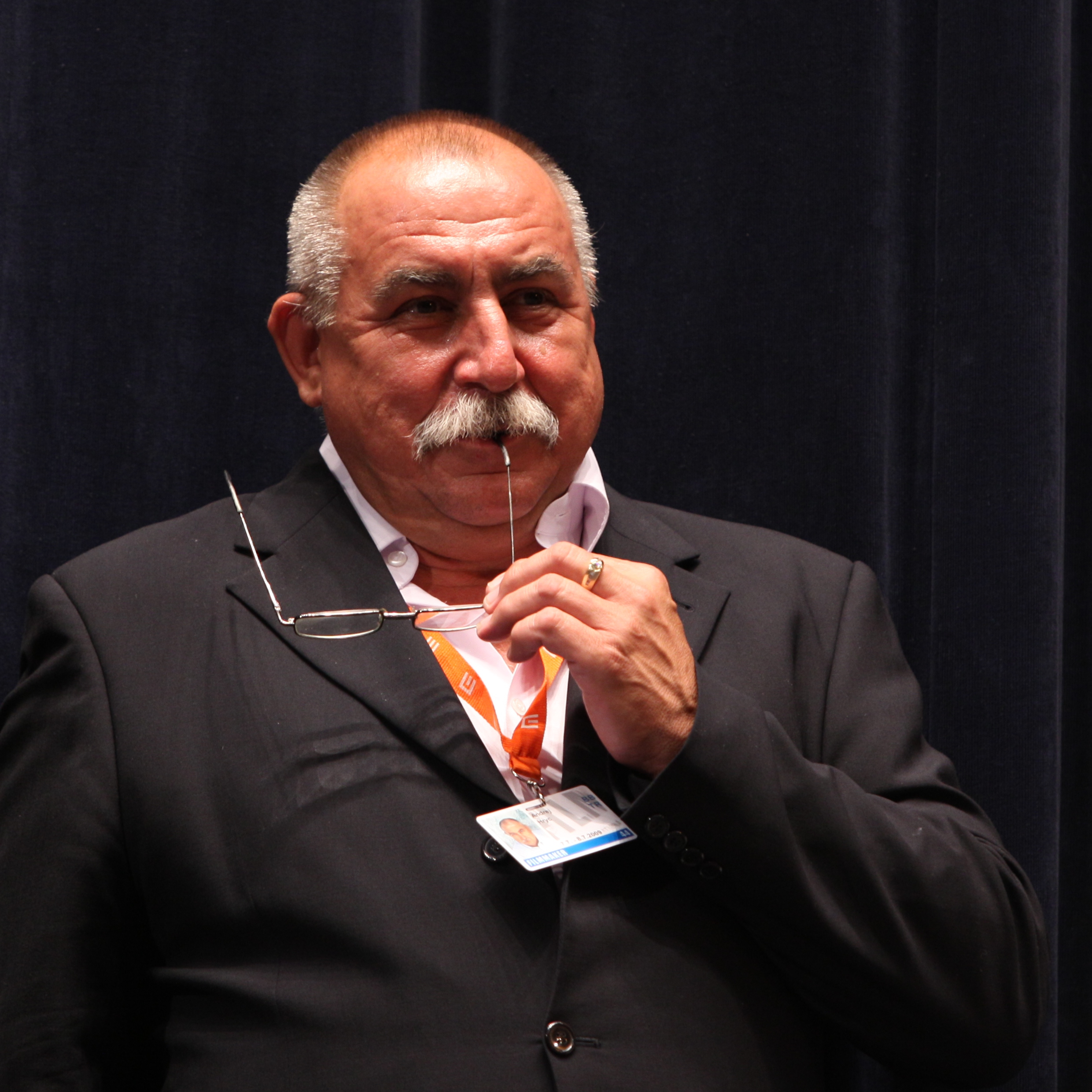
Andrej Hryc

- 31 January – Andrej Hryc,71, actor
- 19 April – Emília Došeková, 83, actress
- 21 December – Ivan Hopta, politician (born 1958).
- 24 December – Jozef Burian, politician (born 1961).
