= Sance =

Sancé or Šance may refer to:

- Sancé, Bam, a town in Burkina Faso
- Sancé, Bazèga, a town in Burkina Faso
- Sancé, Saône-et-Loire, a commune in France
- Šance, Vrbovce, a hamlet in Slovakia
- Šance Reservoir, a reservoir in the Czech Republic
