= 2017 in Slovakia =

- Decades: 1990s; 2000s; 2010s; 2020s
- See also: Other events of 2017; History of Slovakia • Years

Events in the year 2017 in Slovakia.

== Incumbents ==
- President – Andrej Kiska (Independent)
- Prime Minister – Robert Fico (Smer-SD)
- Speaker of the National Council – Andrej Danko

== Events ==
- 17 January – The government approves proposed amendments tightening conditions for job-seekers receiving unemployment benefits.
- 30 March – Parliament adopts a constitutional amendment to revoke amnesties by former Prime Minister Vladimír Mečiar, enabling investigation of the 1995 kidnapping of the president's son and a related 1996 murder.
- 18 April – Thousands protest in Bratislava demanding Interior Minister Robert Kaliňák's resignation over ties to a developer under tax fraud investigation.
- 7-11 June – The 61st edition of the Okolo Slovenska cycling race takes place over five days, starting with a prologue in Levoča and concluding in Trnava.
- 14 June – Modern Trade Unions Volkswagen announces plans for a strike at Volkswagen Slovakia following failed pay negotiations; around 8,500 workers partake.
- 30 August – The Trade Union of Workers in Education and Science refuse to sign a government-proposed memorandum agreeing not to demand further wage increases until 2020.
- 1-9 December – Bratislava hosts the 2017 Women's World Floorball Championships with 16 teams competing; Sweden wins the title after defeating Finland in the final.
- 11 December – President Andrej Kiska officially receives representatives of the LGBT community for the first time in Slovak history.

== Deaths ==
- 27 January – Ján Kobezda, ice hockey player (b. 1975).
- 3 August – Ladislav Čisárik, heraldic artist, painter and graphic designer (b. 1953)
- 14 August – Rozália Danková, Roman Catholic nun (b.1920)
- 23 November – Božena Mačingová
