= Úsvit =

Úsvit, meaning "dawn" in Czech and Slovak, may refer to:

- Dawn - National Coalition, political party in the Czech Republic
- Dawn (Slovakia), political party in the Slovak Republic
- Úsvit, a 2023 Czech and Slovak crime drama film directed by Matěj Chlupáček.
