= 2009 in Slovakia =

- Decades: 1980s; 1990s; 2000s; 2010s; 2020s
- See also: Other events of 2009; History of Slovakia • Years

The following lists events that happened during 2009 in Slovakia.

== Incumbents ==
- President: Ivan Gašparovič
- Prime Minister: Robert Fico

== Events ==
- Slovakia in the Eurovision Song Contest 2009

=== January ===
- January 1 - Slovakia changes currency, replacing the koruna with the euro.

== Predicted and scheduled events ==
- June - European Parliament election

=== Unknown Dates ===
- Presidential election

== Births ==
- 22 June – Dominik Kočik, darts player
