= 2014 in Slovakia =

- Decades: 1990s; 2000s; 2010s; 2020s
- See also: Other events of 2014; History of Slovakia • Years

Events in the year 2014 in Slovakia.

== Incumbents ==
- President: Ivan Gašparovič (until 15 June), Andrej Kiska (starting 15 June)
- Prime Minister: Robert Fico

== Events ==
- March 15 - the first round of the Slovak presidential election is held. Prime Minister Robert Fico and businessman-turned philanthropist Andrej Kiska advance to the second round.
- March 29 – Philanthropist Andrej Kiska wins Slovakia's presidential run-off against current Prime Minister Robert Fico.

== Deaths ==
- Vladimír Krajňák, 86, Slovak Olympic skier.
- Ján Hirka, 90, Slovak Catholic hierarch, Bishop of Prešov (1990–2002).
- Ľudovít Lehen, 88, Slovak painter and chess composer.
- Miroslav Hlinka, 42, Slovak ice hockey player, gold medalist at the 2002 IIHF World Championship, suicide by hanging.
- Vladimír Hrivnák, 69, Slovak football player and manager.
