= Anton Srholec =

Slovak Roman Catholic priest and writer (1929–2016)

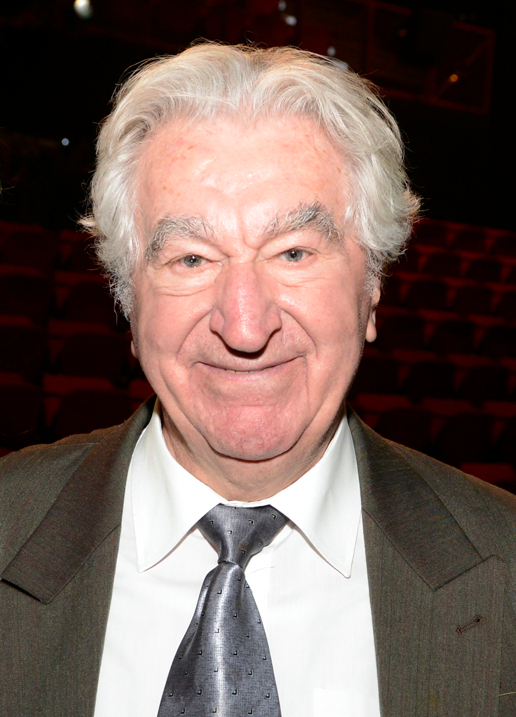
Srholec in December 2014.

Anton Srholec (12 June 1929, Skalica – 7 January 2016, Bratislava) was a Slovak Catholic priest and Salesian. He was also a writer, charity worker and head of the Resota center for homeless people in Bratislava.

== Early life ==
Anton Srholec was born as one of seven children to the farmer parents. He studied at the secondary school in Skalica, Trnava and Šaštín.

== Preparation for priesthood ==
In 1946, he entered the Salesian Society with the purpose to educate the poor youth. Because in 1950 the communist regime dissolved all religious communities, he was able to complete his secondary education in 1951 in Bratislava as a lay person only. As it was not possible for him to study theology at that time, on 9 April 1951 attempted (as many other young people led by a Salesian priest Titus Zeman) to cross the borders illegally so he could fulfill his goal abroad. The escape was not successful due to overflowing banks of the Morava River and the group was caught. As a result, he was arrested on 13 April 1951 and detained at the Leopoldov prison. As a 22-year old he was convicted and sentenced to 12 years in prison together with a group of about 20 similarly charged students of theology and priests for the crime of attempted unauthorised crossing of the national borders.

He spent 10 years in prison, mostly at uranium mines in Jáchymov. (He depicted his life at this labour camp in his book Svetlo z hlbín Jáchymovských lágrov. The book was later translated and published in Slovenian, German and English language with the title Light From the Depths of Jachymov Concentration Camps). He was released from prison on 9 May 1960 and found employment as a labourer at construction sites, at the factory for prefabricated parts and later at furnaces at Ostrava steel plant. At the same time he secretly studied theology and managed to pass the state exam from the English and German language. He twice tried to unsuccessfully enrol to study at the seminary in Bratislava. As a Salesian he professed his final vows secretly on 9 August 1964. In 1969, during the Prague Spring, he received permission to travel to Italy for three months. He extended his trip for a year and completed his theological studies at the Salesian Pontifical University in Turin.

He was ordained to the priesthood by Pope Paul VI in Rome on 17 May 1970.

== Work as a priest ==
As a newly ordained priest Anton Srholec returned home as he wanted to be useful in his own country. He found employment as a sacristan at the Church of Assumption of Virgin Mary - Blumental in Bratislava where a priest helped him to arrange for a state permission to carry out a priestly service. He dedicated his activities mainly to the youth.

The State Security constantly watched his work with the youth and as a result in 1974 he was transferred outside Bratislava to the parish of Pernek where he kept being visited by many people and also secret Salesians. After three years he was transferred to Veľké Zálužie and finally to Záhorská Ves in 1982. During the feast at Velehrad on 7 July 1985 he organized a youth programme and it was the last motive for the State Security to remove his state permission for the parish work.

== Later years ==
Four years before his retirement he worked as an operator at a depot, first at a Ružinov hospital in Bratislava, later at Doprastav. He continued with his pastoral work. After the Velvet Revolution in 1989 he started caring for people on the margins of society. As a pensioner he became a board member of a Konto nádeje and the Slovak Confederation of Political Prisoners where he was a head for some time. In 1995 he founded a shelter for the homeless called Resoty in Bratislava and became its manager.

== Death ==
Anton Srholec died at the age of 86 on 7 January 2016 in early hours in Bratislava after 68 years of religious life and 45 years as a priest. The last farewell took place on 12 January 2016 at Church of Assumption of Virgin Mary - Blumental in Bratislava and the Church of St Michael in Skalica, where he is buried.
