= 1993 in Slovakia =

- Decades: 1970s; 1980s; 1990s; 2000s; 2010s
- See also: Other events of 1993; History of Slovakia • Years

The following lists events that happened during 1993 in Slovakia.

== Incumbents ==
- President: Michal Kováč (starting 2 March)
- Prime Minister: Vladimír Mečiar

== Events ==
- Dissolution of Czechoslovakia
- Citizenship Act (Slovakia)

== Births ==
- 29 May – Jana Čepelová, tennis player
