= Dawn (Slovakia) =

- Founded: May 2005
- Split from: Communist Party of Slovakia
- Headquarters: Mierová 68, Humenné
- Newspaper: Úsvit
- Membership (2021): 119 (▲10)
- Ideology: Communism
- Political position: Far-left
- National Council: 0 / 150
- European Parliament: 0 / 15

Dawn (Slovak: Úsvit) is a far-left Slovak political party formed in May 2005 as a split from the Communist Party of Slovakia (KSS). It is led by Ivan Hopta. Hopta was excluded from the KSS because of personal conflicts. The party publishes a magazine called Dawn (Úsvit), which seems to be its only activity. The party's main base is the Eastern Slovak town of Humenné, where Hopta lives. Dawn is considered to be orthodox-communist.
