= Anna Belousovová =

Slovak politician

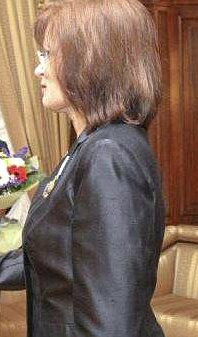

Deputy Speaker of the National Council
- In office 4 July 2006 – 8 July 2010 Serving with Milan Hort, Miroslav Číž
- Speaker: Pavol Paška

Member of the National Council of Slovakia
- In office 29 October 1998 – 15 October 2002
- In office 7 February 2006 – 4 April 2012

Personal details
- Born: Anna Malíková; 8 August 1959 (age 67) Vysoká nad Kysucou, Czechoslovakia
- Party: Slovak National Party
- Education: Comenius University in Bratislava
- Occupation: Politician
- Profession: Teacher
- Website: RNDr. Anna Belousovová at National Council of Slovakia

Anna Belousovová (née Malíková; born 8 August 1959) is a Slovak politician and a former Deputy Speaker of the National Council of Slovakia.

== Political career ==
In 1990 Anna Belousovová became a founding member of the Slovak National Party, which she led between the years 1999 and 2003, making her the first female leader in the party's history. The intra-party rivalry with Ján Slota led to her removal from party leadership in 2010 and subsequent expulsion from the party in 2011.

She was elected as a member of the National Council in the 1998 - 2002, 2006 - 2010 and 2010 - 2012 terms. Between 2006 and 2010 she served as a Deputy Speaker of the council.

== Personal life ==
In 2001 she married a Russian businessman Alexander Belousov, who died in 2004.
