= 2020 in Slovakia =

- Decades: 2000s; 2010s; 2020s
- See also: Other events of 2020; History of Slovakia • Years

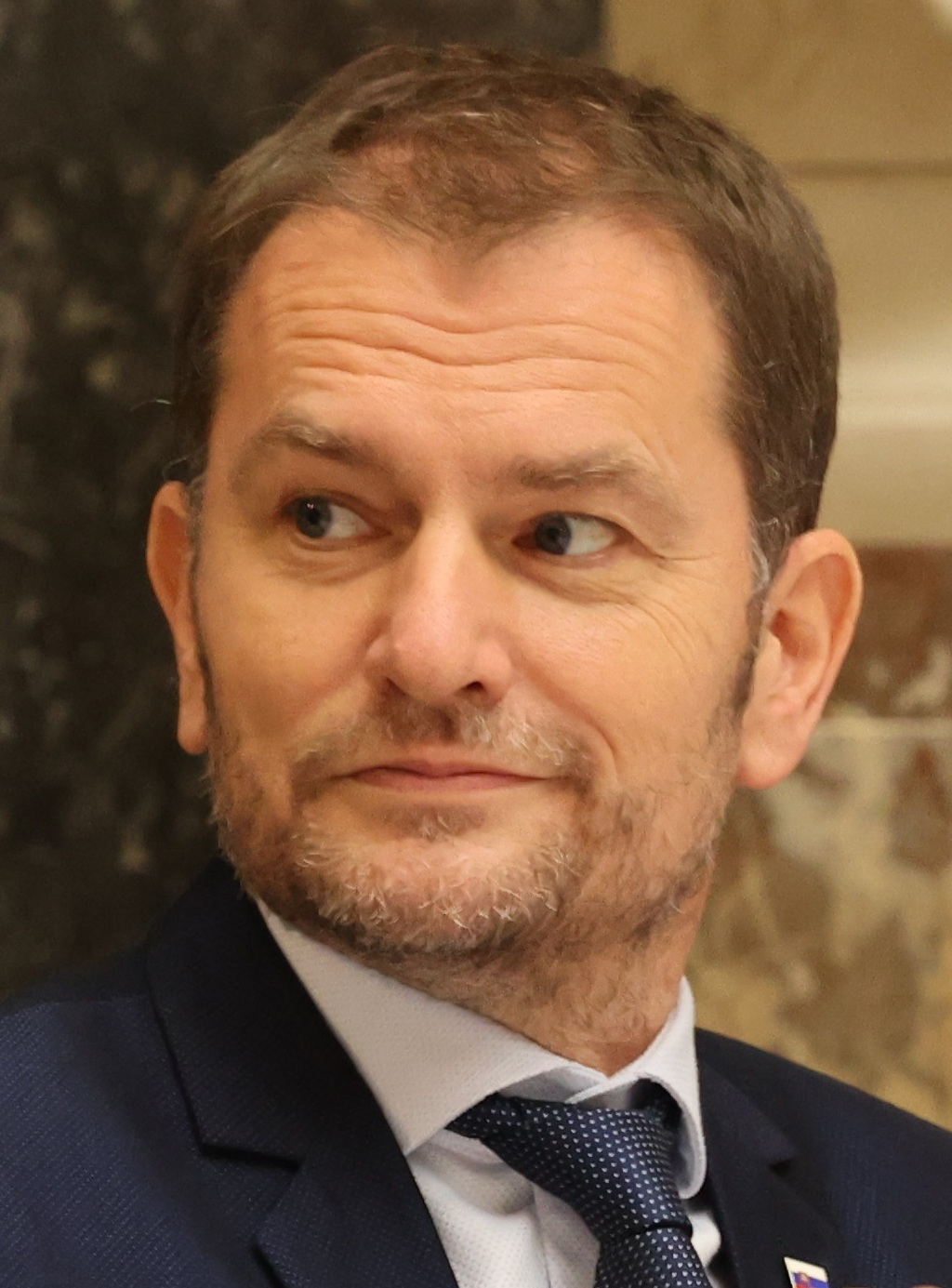
Igor Matovič at the EPP summit in October 2020

== Incumbents ==
- President: Zuzana Čaputová
- Prime Minister: Peter Pellegrini (until 21 March), Igor Matovič (starting 22 March)

== Events ==
Ongoing — COVID-19 pandemic in Slovakia

=== Politics ===
- 29 February: 2020 Slovak parliamentary election
- 25 April: Juraj Hipš elected as new leader of SPOLU.
- 30 May: László Sólymos elected as new leader of Most–Híd.
- 6 June: Irena Bihariová elected as new leader of Progressive Slovakia.
- 10 June: Former Prime Minister Peter Pellegrini and several other members leave Smer–SD to found Hlas–SD.
- 20 July: Krisztián Forró elected as new leader of SMK, member party of MKÖ-MKS.
- 20 October: a bill that would have tightened abortion laws was defeated by the Parliament of Slovakia, with 59 votes against and 58 votes in favor.
- 24 October: Coronavirus lockdown
