= Dissolution of Czechoslovakia =

1992 partition into the Czech Republic and Slovakia

Dissolution of Czechoslovakia "Velvet Divorce"
- Part of the aftermath of the Revolutions of 1989
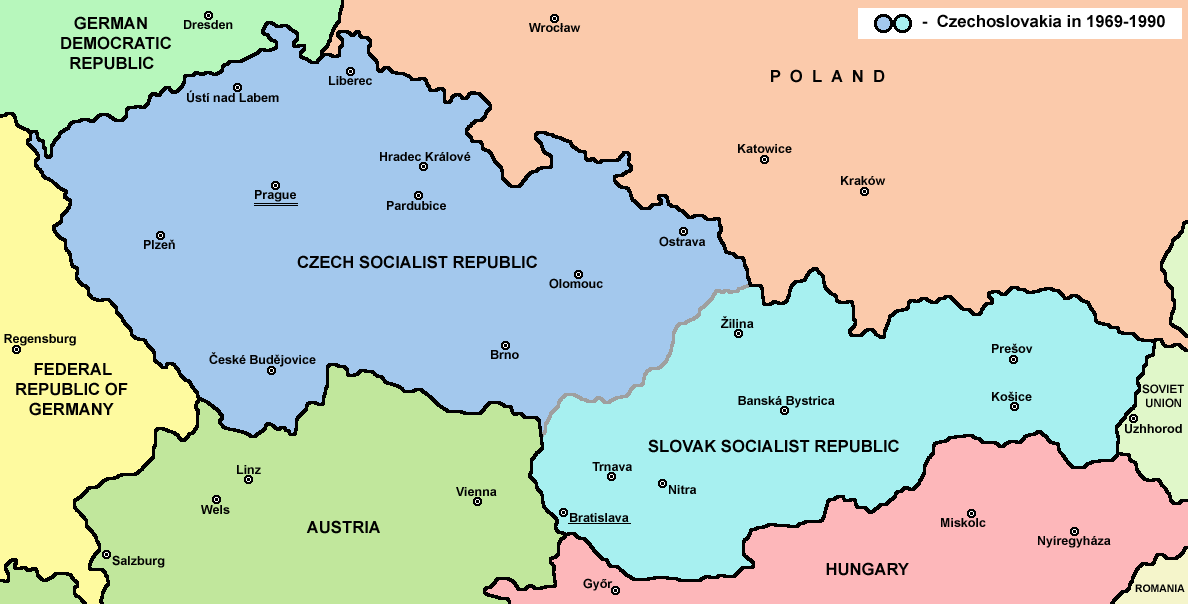
- Czechoslovakia between 1968 (Constitutional Law of Federation) and 1989 (Velvet Revolution)
- Date: 17 July 1992 – 31 December 1992 (5 months and 2 weeks)
- Location: Czech and Slovak Federative Republic; → Czech Republic; → Slovak Republic
- Outcome: Breakup of Czechoslovakia into the independent Czech Republic and Slovakia

The dissolution of Czechoslovakia, (Note: Czech: Rozdělení Československa; Slovak: Rozdelenie Československa) which took effect on 31 December 1992, was the self-determined partition of the Czech and Slovak Federative Republic into the independent countries of the Czech Republic and Slovakia. These mirrored the Czech Socialist Republic and the Slovak Socialist Republic, which had been created in 1969 as the constituent states of the Czechoslovak Socialist Republic until the end of 1989.

It is sometimes known as the Velvet Divorce, a reference to the bloodless Velvet Revolution of 1989, which had led to the end of the rule of the Communist Party of Czechoslovakia. The dissolution of Czechoslovakia is closely linked to the end of the Cold War and the dissolution of other Eastern Bloc countries such as the Dissolution of the Soviet Union and the Breakup of Yugoslavia. Unlike Yugoslavia, which was also created in 1918 and disappeared in 1992, Czechoslovakia did not experience violent clashes due to nationalism, which in the case of Yugoslavia led to the Yugoslav Wars. Its dissolution was also viewed as unpopular especially at the time, with criticism as to why no referendum was held.

Though peaceful, a similar earlier attempt that dissolved Czechoslovakia took place in 1939 when Nazi Germany partitioned the country into two client states, Protectorate of Bohemia and Moravia and First Slovak Republic. The easternmost region of Carpathia, historically called Transcarpathia, Transcarpathian Ruthenia, or Subcarpathian Ruthenia, became Carpatho-Ukraine, before being annexed into Hungary, and later the Soviet Union in 1946, where it exists today as part of Ukraine as Zakarpattia Oblast.

== Background ==
Czechoslovakia was created with the dissolution of Austria-Hungary at the end of World War I. In 1918, at a meeting in the American city of Pittsburgh, the future Czechoslovak President Tomáš Garrigue Masaryk and other Czech and Slovak representatives signed the Pittsburgh Agreement, which promised a common state consisting of two equal nations: Slovaks and Czechs. However, the Czechoslovak Constitution of 1920 specified a single "Czechoslovak nation".

In subsequent years, there were political tensions in the new country between Czechoslovakists and those seeking greater autonomy for the Slovaks in particular. In March 1939, with pressure from Adolf Hitler, the First Slovak Republic was created as a satellite state of Germany with limited sovereignty. The alignment with the Soviet Union after World War II oversaw the reunification into the Third Czechoslovak Republic.

In 1968, the Constitutional Law of Federation reinstated an official federal structure of the 1917 type, but during the Normalization Period in the 1970s, Gustáv Husák, despite being a Slovak himself, returned most control to Prague. That approach encouraged a regrowth of Slovak separatism after the fall of communism.

== Partition into two entities ==
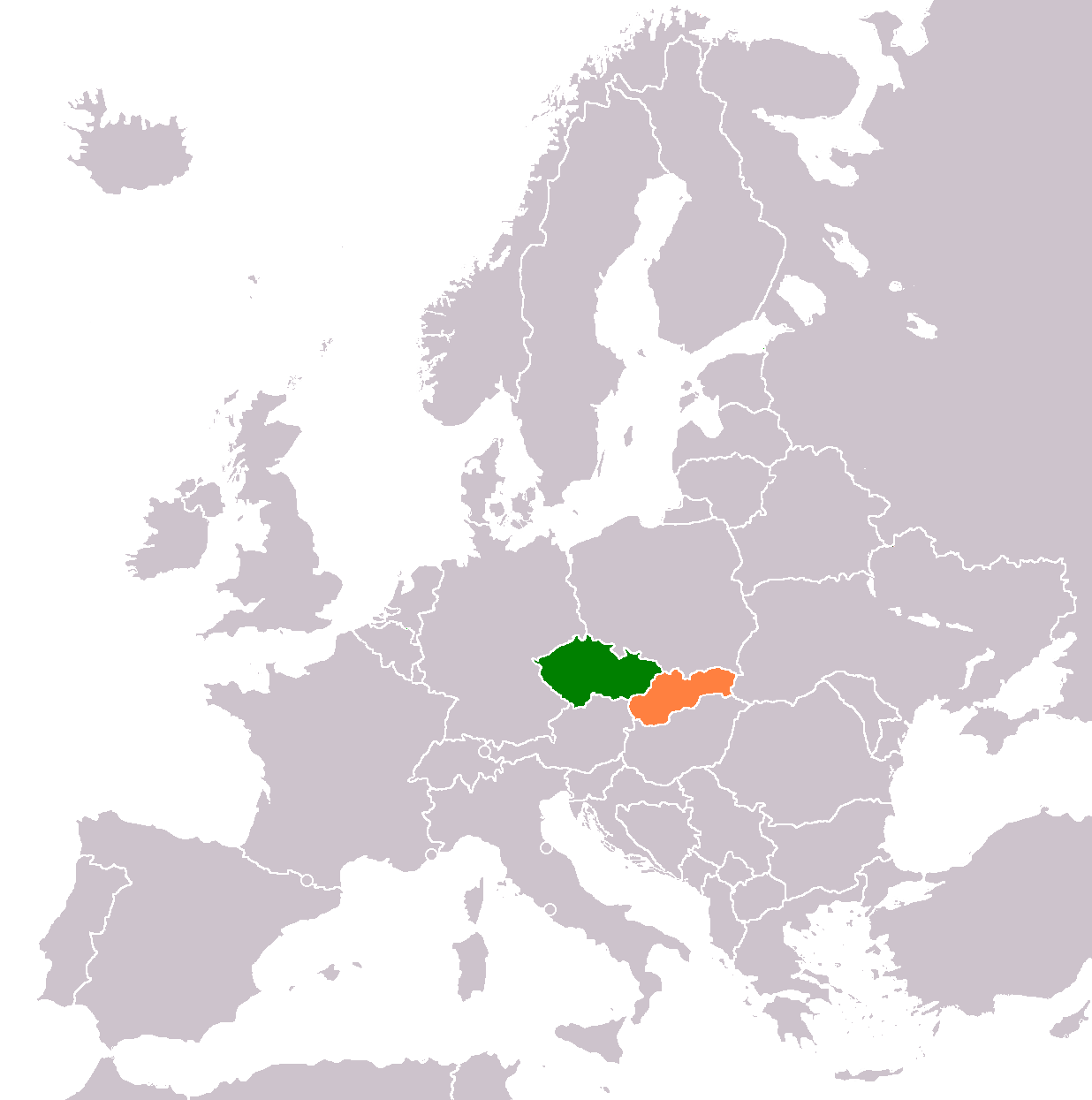
- Czech Republic: Slovakia

By 1991, the Czech Republic's GDP per capita was some 20% higher than Slovakia's. Transfer payments from the Czech budget to Slovakia, which had been the rule in the past, were stopped in January 1991.

Many Czechs and Slovaks desired the continued existence of a federal Czechoslovakia. However, the politicians of leading Slovak parties in Parliament, notably the Slovak National Party, would stand to benefit politically if the country were split in two, and advocated a looser form of complete independence and sovereignty. For a few years, political parties re-emerged, but Czech parties had little or no presence in Slovakia and vice versa. To have a functioning state, the government demanded continued control from Prague, but Slovaks continued to ask for decentralisation.

In 1992, the Czech Republic elected Václav Klaus and others, who demanded either a tighter federation ("viable federation") or two independent states. Vladimír Mečiar and other leading Slovak politicians wanted a kind of confederation. Both sides opened frequent and intense negotiations in June. On 17 July, the Slovak parliament adopted the declaration of independence of the Slovak nation. Six days later, Klaus and Mečiar agreed to partition Czechoslovakia into two separate states at a meeting in Bratislava. Czechoslovak President Václav Havel resigned, rather than oversee the partition, which he had opposed. In a September 1992 opinion poll, only 37% of Slovaks and 36% of Czechs favoured dissolution.

The goal of negotiations switched to achieving a peaceful division. Peaceful division was prioritized as the process ran in parallel with the violent breakup of Yugoslavia (another formerly socialist, Slavic federal state created in 1918 after the dissolution of Austria-Hungary).

On 13 November 1992, the Federal Assembly passed Constitution Act 541, which settled the division of property between the Czech lands and Slovakia. With Constitution Act 542, passed on 25 November, they agreed to the secession of Czechoslovakia into two entities as of 31 December 1992.

The partition occurred without violence and so was thus said to be "velvet", much like the "Velvet Revolution", which had preceded it and had been accomplished by massive peaceful demonstrations and actions. In contrast, other post-communist breakups (such as the Soviet Union and Yugoslavia) involved violent conflict. Czechoslovakia is the only former Eastern Bloc state that had an entirely peaceful breakup. At the beginning of 1993, as Slovakia's economy struggled, Slovaks said the dissolution was a "sandpaper divorce".

== Causes ==
A number of reasons have been given for the dissolution of Czechoslovakia, with the main debates focusing on whether dissolution was inevitable or whether dissolution occurred in conjunction with or even in contrast to the events that occurred between the Velvet Revolution of 1989 and the end of the joined state in 1992.

Those who argue from the inevitability stance tend to point to the differences between the two nations, which date back to the Austro-Hungarian Empire, and to other issues. There are differences between the Czechs and Slovaks, such as problems with the shared state during communism, the success of the state in the Czech lands, its failure in the Slovak lands that still resulted in the adoption of communism since the Czechs were more influential in the running of the state than Slovaks, and the 1968 constitution with its minority veto.

Those who argue that events between 1989 and 1992 led to the dissolution point to international factors such as the breakaway of the Soviet satellite nations, the lack of unified media between the Czech Republic and Slovakia, and most importantly the actions of the political leaders of both nations like the disagreements between Prime Ministers Klaus and Mečiar.

== Legal aspects ==
=== National symbols ===
Since the coat of arms of Czechoslovakia was a composition of those of the historic geographic areas forming the country, each republic simply kept its own symbol: the Czechs the lion and the Slovaks the double cross. The same principle was applied to the two-part bilingual Czechoslovak national anthem that comprised two separate pieces of music, the Czech stanza "Kde domov můj" and the Slovak stanza "Nad Tatrou sa blýska". Disputes occurred only with respect to the Czechoslovak flag. During the 1992 negotiations on the details of dissolution of Czechoslovakia, as demanded by Vladimír Mečiar and Václav Klaus, a clause forbidding the use of the state symbols of Czechoslovakia by its successor states was inserted into the constitutional law on the dissolution of Czechoslovakia.

From 1990 to 1992, the red and white flag of Bohemia (differing only slightly from the Polish flag by proportion and tone) officially served as the flag of the Czech Republic. Eventually, after a search for new symbols, the Czech Republic unilaterally decided to ignore the aforementioned law and to keep the Czechoslovak flag, with an altered meaning. Slovakia, meanwhile, adopted its traditional flag; however, just before independence, on 3 September 1992, the coat of arms was added to prevent confusion with the similar flags of Russia and of Slovenia.

=== Territory ===
The national territory was divided along the existing internal borders, but the border was not clearly defined at some points and, in some areas, the border cut across streets, access roads and communities that had coexisted for centuries. The most serious issues occurred around the following areas:

- U Sabotů or Šance – historically part of Moravia, awarded to Slovakia in 1997
- Sidonie or Sidónia – historically part of Hungary (which contained all present-day Slovak territory until 1918), awarded to the Czech Republic in 1997
- Kasárna recreational area – historically Moravian, disputed between Moravia and Hungary since the 16th century, formally part of Hungary since 1734; accessible by car only from the Czech side until early 2000s; remained in Slovakia despite heavy objections from the mostly-Czech property owners, whose real estate effectively fell into a foreign country.

The new countries were able to solve the difficulties via mutual negotiations, financial compensation and then an international treaty covering the border modifications.

People living or owning property in the border area, however, continued to experience practical problems until both new countries entered the Schengen Area in 2007, rendering the border less significant.

=== Division of national property ===
Most federal assets were divided in a ratio of two to one, the approximate ratio between the Czech and Slovak population in Czechoslovakia, including army equipment, rail and airliner infrastructure. Some minor disputes, such as gold reserves stored in Prague and federal know-how valuation, lasted for a few years after the dissolution.

=== Currency division ===
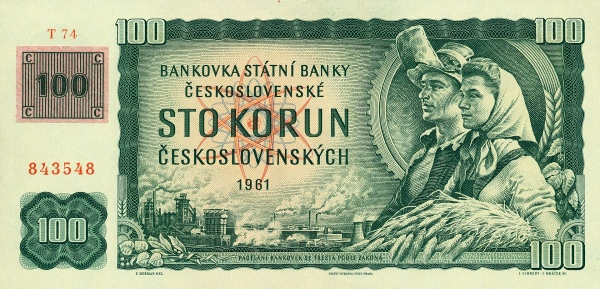
100 korun československých with Czech stamp in 1993

Initially, the old Czechoslovak currency, the Czechoslovak koruna, remained in use by both countries. Czech fears of an economic loss caused the adoption of two national currencies as early as 8 February 1993. On 2 February 1993 Act No. 60/1993 Coll. came in effect in the Czech Republic to create a separate currency that was already envisaged in the Czech Constitution and in Act No. 6/1993 Coll. that created the Czech National Bank which issued a new Czech currency by stamping Czechoslovak banknotes. The stamps had already been prepared in secret in 1992 after the decision about the dissolution of Czechoslovakia. In December 1992 some of the reserve banknotes started to be stamped in the selected banks in secret. From 8 February to 12 February old banknotes of 100, 500 and 1,000 Kčs (Czechoslovak crowns) were exchanged for the stamped ones in the Czech Republic and a new 200 Kč banknote was introduced. Each person over 15 could exchange banknotes up to 4,000 crowns, and minors below 15 years of age up to 1,000 crowns. Banknotes of lower denominations and coins remained until new ones were printed and minted. Banks in the Czech Republic converted all money on 8 February 1993 from Kčs to Kč. In Slovakia stamps were also applied on banknotes, and a new 10 SK coin was introduced. At the beginning, the currencies could be exchanged at par, but later the value of the Slovak koruna was usually lower than that of the Czech koruna (in 2004, around 25–27% lower). On 2 August 1993, both currencies were distinguished by different stamps that were first affixed to and then printed on old Czechoslovak koruna banknotes. New Czech and Slovak coins replaced old ones during 1993.

On 1 January 2009, Slovakia adopted the euro as its currency, with a conversion rate of 30.126 SK/€, and the €2 commemorative coin for 2009, Slovakia's first, featured the 20th anniversary of the Velvet Revolution in remembrance of the common struggle of the Czechoslovaks for democracy. By a quirk of fate, the welcoming speech on behalf of the European Union on the occasion of Slovakia's entry to the eurozone was delivered by Mirek Topolánek, the prime minister of the presiding country, the Czech Republic, naturally in his native language, but the other guest speakers used English. The Czech Republic continues to use the Czech koruna, or crown.

=== International law ===
Neither the Czech nor Slovak republics sought recognition as the sole successor state to Czechoslovakia. This can be contrasted to the dissolution of the Soviet Union, when the Russian Federation was recognized as successor state not only to the Russian SFSR but also to the Soviet Union itself, and also contrasts with the dissolution of Yugoslavia, where the rump Federal Republic of Yugoslavia, dominated by Serbia and encompassing only it and Montenegro, unsuccessfully demanded recognition as the sole successor to the Socialist Federative Republic of Yugoslavia, even though the four remaining ex-Yugoslav states, now independent, collectively encompassed around three-fifths of former Yugoslavia, both in population and in territory. Therefore, Czechoslovakia's membership in the United Nations ceased upon the dissolution of the country, but on 19 January 1993, the Czech Republic and Slovakia were admitted as new, separate states.

With respect to other international treaties, the Czechs and the Slovaks agreed to honour the treaty obligations of Czechoslovakia. The Slovaks transmitted a letter to the Secretary General of the United Nations on 19 May 1993, to express their intent to remain a party to all treaties signed and ratified by Czechoslovakia and to ratify treaties signed but not ratified before dissolution of Czechoslovakia. The letter acknowledged that under international law, all treaties signed and ratified by Czechoslovakia would remain in force. For example, both countries are recognized as signatories of the Antarctic Treaty from the date that Czechoslovakia had signed the agreement in 1962.

Both countries have ratified the Vienna Convention on Succession of States in respect of Treaties, and it was not a factor in the dissolution of Czechoslovakia since it did not come into force until 1996.

== Aftermath ==
=== Economy ===
A customs union between the Czech Republic and Slovakia remained in place from the dissolution until 1 May 2004, when both countries entered the European Union (EU).

According to The Prague Post, "Slovak GDP reached 95 percent of the Czech GDP, and it is likely to draw level with it. The Slovak gross national product (GNP), which includes citizens' incomes abroad and deducts the money multinational companies move out of the country, is higher than the Czech one. Old-age pensions are more or less at the same level in both countries, and the consumption per capita is slightly higher in Slovakia. However, salaries are 10 percent lower on average in Slovakia than in the Czech Republic".

=== Citizenship ===
Since federalisation in 1968, Czechoslovakia had divided citizenship, either of the Czech Socialist Republic or of the Slovak Socialist Republic, the word Socialist being dropped from both names shortly after the Velvet Revolution. That distinction, however, had little effect on citizens' life. On 1 January 1993, all Czechoslovak citizens automatically became citizens either of the Czech Republic or the Slovak Republic, based on their previous citizenship, permanent residence address, birthplace, family ties, job and other criteria. Additionally, people had one year's time to claim the other citizenship under certain conditions.

Slovak legislation allowed dual citizenship until 2010, when it was abolished under the Citizenship Act. Only a handful of people have exercised that right, but its significance is lessened by both nations' membership in the EU as the freedom of movement for workers, a policy that guarantees EU citizens the right to work and to live anywhere in the Union. In the case of movement between the Czech Republic and Slovakia, the policy took effect from 2004.

By contrast, the Czech Republic had prohibited dual citizenship for naturalized citizens and required them to give up existing citizenship(s) prior to receiving citizenship of the Czech Republic. That requirement could only be waived if giving up an existing citizenship might put the applicant or their relatives in danger of persecution in their homeland, which was not the case of applicants from Slovakia. That situation changed with the new Citizenship Act of 2013 (186/2013 Sb.), in force since 1 January 2014. However, most Slovak citizens are still unable to become dual citizens of both the Czech Republic and Slovakia since they automatically lose Slovak citizenship upon voluntarily acquiring another one (see previous paragraph). Exempt from that law are only Slovak citizens who obtain a foreign citizenship by virtue of marriage with a foreign national. Some Slovak politicians have speculated in the media about softening the Citizenship Act, but no change has yet materialised as of January 2015.

Citizens of both countries were allowed to cross the border using an ID card instead of a passport and were allowed to work anywhere without the need to obtain an official permit. Border checks were completely removed on 21 December 2007, when both countries joined the Schengen Agreement.

Under the current European regulations, citizens of either country are entitled to the diplomatic protection of any other EU country and so both have been considering merging their embassies, together with nations of the Visegrád Group, to reduce costs.

==== Roma people ====
One of the problems not solved during dissolution was the question of a large number of Romani living in the Czech Republic born and officially registered in today's Slovakia. Most of them did not re-register their official place of stay during the months before dissolution and so the question of their citizenship was left open. The 1992 Czech Nationality Act allowed a grant of automatic citizenship only to those who were born on Czech territory. For others, the right to citizenship required proof of a five-year period of residence, an "unobjectionable" criminal record, significant fees and a complicated bureaucratic process, which reportedly excluded a rather large percentage of Roma.

The Slovak government did not want to grant citizenship to nonresidents. Significant numbers of Roma living in Czech orphanages did not have their legal status clarified and were released from care as adult noncitizens without any right to work or live in the Czech Republic. Under pressure from the European Union, the Czech government made amendments to its nationality law in 1999 and 2003, which effectively solved the problem, but compensation has not been provided to those rendered stateless in 1992.

=== Language contacts ===
In the former Czechoslovakia, the first television channel was a federal one, and the Czech and Slovak languages were used in equal ratios in the television news there, but foreign films and television series were almost exclusively dubbed into Czech, for example. That and the great similarity of the two languages made almost all people of both nations passively bilingual: they could understand but not necessarily speak the other language. After the dissolution in 1990s, the new television channels in the Czech Republic practically stopped using Slovak, and young Czech people now have a much lower understanding of Slovak. Also, the number of Slovak-language books and newspapers sold in the Czech Republic dropped drastically. The Czech television news, however, started to reintroduce Slovak-language coverage from Slovakia and Slovak television (STV2) rebroadcasts the Czech television newscast Události ČT daily, ten minutes after midnight.

On the public Radio and Television of Slovakia, it is common to have at least one daily newscast from the Czech Republic during prime time news. Furthermore, many programmes on Slovak television channels are still dubbed into Czech, some films in cinemas are subtitled in Czech and there are far more Czech-language books and periodicals on the market than there were before the dissolution. The major boost for the language interchange has come from private television channel providers like CS Link (Czech Republic) and Sky Link (Slovakia) that offer Slovak channels in the Czech Republic and vice versa. Additionally, several channels, regardless of their national origin, offer programs both in Czech and Slovak (CSFilm, TV Barrandov) or even mix like TV Nova's Nova Sport coverage of the English Premier League. New impulses to mutual contacts coming via television are also common shows like the Intelligence Test of Nations, Czechoslovakia's Got Talent, and Masked Singer broadcast by PRIMA and TV JOJ, and Czecho-Slovak SuperStar, the latter being the first international edition of the Pop Idol song contest broadcast by TV Nova and Markíza (both owned by CME), which also organized joint versions of MasterChef and The Voice in 2012. Also, the New Year's Eve Program for 2009 was prepared and broadcast jointly by ČT and STV and for 2010 by the Czech TV PRIMA and the Slovak TV JOJ, this time even including the singing of the Czechoslovak national anthem.

Young Slovak people still have the same knowledge of Czech as their predecessors, if not better. In Slovakia, Czech may still be used automatically in all judicial proceedings, and all documents written in Czech are acknowledged by Slovak authorities and vice versa. Further, the Slovak Official Language Act, passed in 2009, reconfirmed the right of Czechs to use their language in all official communication when dealing with Slovak authorities although it explicitly limited the use of Czech in Slovakia to persons with Czech as their mother tongue. The same is true about using Slovak in the Czech Republic under the Administration Procedure Act of 2004. Gustáv Slamečka, a Slovak citizen who was the Czech transport minister (2009–2010), used Slovak exclusively during his official communication.

=== Sport ===
The official breakup occurred right in the middle of the 1993 World Junior Ice Hockey Championships, which took place in Sweden. The team representing Czechoslovakia was renamed "Czech–Slovak" on 1 January. In international ice hockey tournaments, the Czech Republic took over Czechoslovakia's place in the A-groups, and Slovakia had to start in the lower divisions.

During the FIS Nordic World Ski Championships 1993 in Falun, Sweden, the ski jumping team competed as a combined Czech–Slovak team in the team large hill event and won silver. The team had been selected before the dissolution. Jaroslav Sakala won two medals in the individual hill events for the Czech Republic at those games along with his silver in the team event.

In their qualifying section for the 1994 FIFA World Cup, the Czechoslovakia national football team competed under the name RCS, which stood for "Representation of Czechs and Slovaks". In their last game as "Representation of Czechs and Slovaks", the team failed to qualify after it got only a draw in its final match against Belgium, a match that it had to win to qualify. It was afterward that it was officially split up into Czech and Slovak national teams, with both being declared successors to Czechoslovakia.

The mutual encounters between the national teams of both countries in many sports are followed by most of the populations, and the number of players and coaches active in the other republic is significant. Martin Lipták, a Slovak handball coach, successfully led the Czech national team to the EHF 2010 Handball European Championship in Austria. A Slovak team under his coaching, Tatran Prešov, won the Czech national league in 2008 and 2009. Czech ice hockey coach Vladimír Vůjtek led the Slovak national team to the silver medal at the 2012 IIHF World Championship, having beaten the Czech team in the semifinals.

Several sports have featured a common league, and discussions about having a common football or ice hockey league continue.

The road cyclist Ján Svorada earned Slovak citizenship in 1993. In 1994, he became the first Slovak rider ever to win a Tour de France stage. Two years later, he earned Czech citizenship, and he became the first Czech rider ever to win another Tour de France stage in 1998.

=== Telecommunications ===
The two successor states continued to use the country code +42 until February 1997, when it was replaced by two separate codes: +420 for the Czech Republic and +421 for Slovakia. Since then, telephone calls between both countries have required international dialing.

== Legacy ==
=== Referendum controversy ===
Soon after the dissolution, public satisfaction was relatively low, with large portions of the population on both sides of the border protesting the fact that the dissolution of the common state was not put to a vote, as described by politologist Lubomír Kopeček of Masaryk University. A March 1993 study conducted by Martin Bútora and his wife Zora indicated that in case of a referendum about 50% of the population would have voted against the dissolution of the state with only about 30% in favour of the dissolution.

Former Slovak Minister of Culture Marek Maďarič, pointed out, in January 2023, that the dissolution without a referendum reflected the historic practice and a tradition of constitutional stately affairs decided without a referendum in Czechoslovak history. Namely, both the formation of the First Czechoslovak Republic from the rubbles of Austria-Hungary in 1918 as well as the reunion of the Protectorate and Slovak State to form a Third Republic in 1945 after the conclusion of the World War II were achieved without a referendum, solely through the pursuit of political representatives of the era.

=== Public polling ===
Public perception of the dissolution has not changed much, with a December 2017 poll showing that just 42% of Czechs and 40% of Slovaks agree with what happened (compared to 36% and 37% in 1992, respectively). Surveys from 2010 showed that the majority of the population of Prague (Czechs) still considers the division of the country a mistake; similarly, the general representative survey in Slovakia (from 2008) showed that society is still divided in opinion on the dissolution, with 47% favouring the dissolution and 44% considering it a mistake. A 2023 poll from the Czech republic has shown that 50% of Czechs consider the dissolution a correct decision, 39% consider it wrong and 11% are neutral or undecided.

=== Reactionary movements ===
In 2015, a Slovak movement called "Czechoslovakia 2018" was established to try to get a referendum by 2018. Its leader, Ladislav Zelinka, said that he had received thousands of emails and calls from supporters, but it was unable to reach the necessary 350,000 petition signatures. The younger generations of both countries are largely indifferent to the issue since they never experienced the previous period themselves, and older generations are more focused on present issues such as immigration and favour their own separate nationalism.

=== Governmental cooperation ===
Political influences between the countries are minimal, but social democrats tend to cooperate very closely on regional and European topics in recent years. Furthermore, it has become customary that the elected presidents pay their first and last official foreign visits during their term to the other republic of the former Czechoslovakia. Appointed foreign ministers tend to follow that unwritten rule. On 29 October 2012, to commemorate Czechoslovakia's declaration of independence, which occurred on 28 October 1918, the Czech and the Slovak governments held, for the first time, a joint cabinet meeting in the communities of Trenčín and Uherské Hradiště, near the common border.

=== Military cooperation ===
Peacekeeping troops stationed in the former Yugoslavia were put under joint command on several occasions. For example, from 2002 to July 2005, the Czech Armed Forces joined with the Armed Forces of the Slovak Republic to form a joint Czech–Slovak KFOR battalion in Kosovo, which contributed to the Multinational Brigade CENTRE.

=== Trade and tourism ===
Trade relations were re-established and stabilised, and the Czech Republic continues to be Slovakia's most important business partner. After a short interruption, Slovakia's resorts in the Carpathian mountains, especially in the High Tatras and Low Tatras, are again the destination of a growing number of Czech tourists.

=== Commemorations ===
Following the death of the last Czechoslovak (and the first Czech) president, Václav Havel, on 18 December 2011, both the Czech Republic and Slovakia observed a day of national mourning. During the funeral mass in Prague's St. Vitus Cathedral, prayers were recited in an equal ratio in Czech and Slovak.

=== Continued use of name ===
Some companies and organizations established in former Czechoslovakia, such as the bank Československá obchodní banka, the political parties KDU-ČSL and SPR–RSČ, and the Czechoslovak Hussite Church have continued to use the Czechoslovak name after the state's dissolution.

== See also ==
- Breakup of Yugoslavia
- Dissolution of the Soviet Union
- Hyphen War
- Czech Republic–Slovakia relations
- Dissolution of the union between Norway and Sweden (another example of a peaceful dissolution)
