= Milan Mišík =

Slovak geologist (1928–2011)

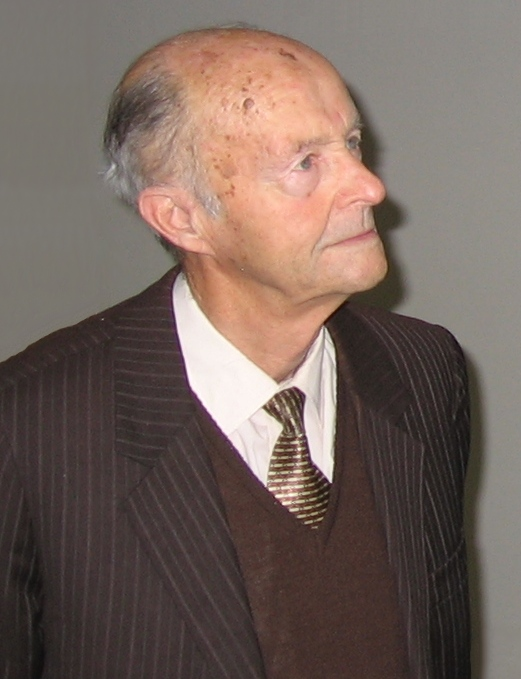
- Mišík in 2008
- Born: 3 November 1928; Skalica, Czechoslovakia
- Died: 7 May 2011 (aged 82); Bratislava, Slovakia
- Education: Comenius University, Faculty of Natural Sciences
- Known for: Sedimentological and petrographic studies in the Western Carpathians
- Scientific career
- Fields: Geology
- Workplaces: Comenius University, Faculty of Natural Sciences

Milan Mišík (3 November 1928 in Skalica, Czechoslovakia – 7 May 2011 in Bratislava, Slovakia) was Slovak geologist and university professor. He specialized in microfacies analysis, stratigraphy, sedimentology, petrography of sedimentary rocks, as well as paleogeography, general and structural geology, and tectonics. His best-known scientific work dealt with carbonate rocks and exotic conglomerates.

== Life and career ==
Born into a family of teachers in Skalica, Slovakia, on 3 November 1928, Milan Mišík graduated from high school in Bratislava in 1947. In 1951, he completed his studies in geology and geography at the Faculty of Natural Sciences of Comenius University. He worked at the university's department of geology and paleontology from 1951 to 1960 as an assistant to professor Dimitrij Andrusov, and from 1960 to 1970 as an associate professor. From 1963 to 1965, Mišík taught at the University of Havana in Cuba, and from 1966 to 1970, he served as the head of the department of geology and paleontology, where he lectured on the regional Geology of the Western Carpathians, petrography of sedimentary rocks, geotectonics, historical geology, and stratigraphy. In 1970, he obtained a doctoral degree and was appointed professor of geology. From 1981 to 1983, he taught geology at a university in Constantine, Algeria. He contributed to the development of the Faculty of Natural Sciences of Comenius University and the development of teaching methodology, and he participated in the preparation of geology experts and researchers. Mišík published his last monograph at the age of 81. He died on 7 May 2011, in Bratislava.

== Research interest ==
Mišík's scientific research was focused on the microfacial and stratigraphic investigation of the Mesozoic rocks of the Western Carpathians, sedimentary petrography of carbonate rocks, and Mesozoic paleogeography. He published more than 130 scientific articles and 34 popular science articles. His best-known work is the monograph Microfacies of Mesozoic and Tertiary limestones of Western Carpathians (in English and Slovak), which met with a positive international response and laid the foundations of modern microfacial analysis in Slovakia. He was also the author of the guidebook Geological Excursion to Slovakia (1976) and an editor of the textbook Stratigraphical and historical geology (1985). He authored entries about the geology of Slovakia in Springer's Encyclopedia of European and Asian regional geology (1997). From 2003 to 2009, together with Daniela Reháková, he published a series of monographs about carbonate sedimentary rocks of the Western Carpathians. He was also an author of the popular science book Relay of Science (1990).

=== Notable papers ===
- Microfacies of the Mesozoic and Tertiary Limestones of the West Carpathians (1966)
- Geology of the Czechoslovak Carpathians in Geography of Czechoslovakia. Part I (in cooperation with Oto Fusán and Augustín Gorek, 1968)
- Geological Excursion to Slovakia (1976)
- Stratigraphic and Historical Geology. (with Ivo Chlupáč and Ivan Cicha, 1985)
- Exotic Conglomerates in Flysch Sequences: Examples from the West Carpathians in M. Rakús, J. Dercourt, A. R. M. Nairn (editors): Evolution of the Northern Margin of Tethys. (together with Róbert Marschalko, 1988)
- Relay of Science (1990)
- Slovakia In E. M. Moores and R. W. Fairbridge (editors): Encyclopedia of European and Asian Regional Geology (1997)
- Psefitic Rocks (Gravel, Breccias, Conglomerates) of the Western Carpathians (with Daniela Reháková, 2004)
- Dolomites, Dolomitizátion, Dedolomitization in Rocks of the Western Carpathians (with Reháková, 2007)
- Limestones of Slovakia – Part I (Bioherm, Crinoidal, Freshwater, Ooidal and Oncoidal Limestones) (with Reháková, 2009)
