= 2011 Košice McDonald's bombing =

- Location: Protifašistických bojovníkov 3012/6, 040 01 Košice, Slovakia
- Date: Wednesday, December 28, 2011; 5:30 p.m. CET (UTC+01:00)
- Attack type: Bombing, lone wolf
- Deaths: 0
- Injuries: 0
- Perpetrator: Ladislav Kuc (sentenced to 25 years)
- Motive: Eco-terrorism, possibly mental illness

The 2011 Košice McDonald's bombing was a partially successful terrorist attack, which occurred on December 28, 2011 in Košice, Slovakia. At approximately 5:30 p.m. CET a timed bomb exploded in a trash can in front of a McDonald's restaurant on Protifašistických bojovníkov 6, in Košice. As there was no one around at the time of the attack, it did not cause any casualties or injuries. Furthermore, it only exploded partially, which did not project nails attached to the explosive. The perpetrator, Ladislav Kuc, was convicted on 8 counts of terrorism, 1 count of attempted terrorism and 1 count of unlawful possession of weapons. He was sentenced to 25 years in a maximum-security prison. It was the first time that anyone had been convicted on terrorism charges in Slovakia.

== Trial ==
The Košice I County Court sentenced Kuc to 25 years for various offenses connected to the attack, as well as to his planned attacks. Throughout the proceedings, Kuc demanded the death penalty (which is banned in Slovakia) and a martyr's death, which his attorney interpreted as signs of mental illness. After filing an appeal at the Košice Regional Court (second-instance court in criminal proceedings), the court initially canceled the lower court's ruling, but after the County Court reviewed new psychological assessment submitted by Kuc's attorney, he was again convicted and sentenced to 25 years in prison. This time the appeal failed and the Regional Court upheld the ruling. Kuc filed an appeal at the Constitutional Court of Slovakia but the court did not challenge the ruling. Having exhausted judicial options in Slovakia, Kuc submitted a petition to the European Court of Human Rights in Strasbourg. The ECHR ruled in 2017 that Slovakia had violated Kuc's human rights by unreasonable and unfounded pre-trial detention. Kuc was awarded EUR17,500 in both damages(EUR6,500) and cost of proceedings(EUR9,000).
