= Gabriela Hermélyová =

Slovak singer and actress (1932–2016)

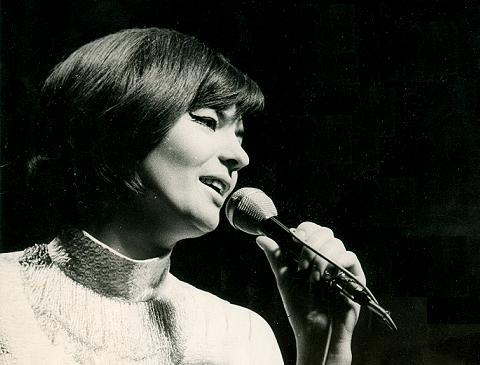

Background information
- Born: June 10, 1932 (age 94); Košice, Czechoslovakia
- Died: 14 August 2016 (aged 84) Bratislava, Slovakia
- Genres: Jazz, Swing
- Instruments: Voice, piano
- Years active: 1953–1970
- Labels: Supraphon; Opus Records

Gabriela Hermélyová (10 June 1932 – 14 August 2016) was a Slovak Swing and Jazz singer and pianist.

== Biography ==
Hermélyová was born on 10 June 1932 in Košice. She started performing Jazz music in the early 1950s. In 1954 she moved to Bratislava, where there was much more active Jazz music scene than in Košice.

Hermélyová lived in Bratislava until her death on 14 August 2016.

== Music career ==
In the late 1950s, Hermélyová gained widespread popularity in Czechoslovakia and performed with all the major Jazz bands in the country. Between 1955 and 1969, she recorded about 30 singles with the Supraphon label. Her 1958 single Môj manžel was among the most successful releases by the label. In 1970, she released her only album Najkrajšia Spomienka with the label Opus Records.

Hermélyová reached the peak of her popularity in the late 1950s and 1960s, during the Prague Spring era of relative openness to the Western culture, when there was a large popular demand for American music genres. Nonetheless, the Warsaw Pact invasion of Czechoslovakia led to the period of normalization in the 1970s and 1980s, when the official culture shunned music genres associated with the "Western Imperialism".

For Jazz musicians like Hermélyová the change resulted in very little opportunities to perform their music and release new records. Hermélyová was deeply disappointed by her declining popularity and bitterly complained about being forgotten. She remained largely unknown by the general music until the renewal of interest in the 1960s music in the early 2010s, which led to a new commercial release of Najkrajšia Spomienka as a double CD along with the Tatjana album by her fellow Jazz singer Tatjana Hubinská.
