= Miroslav Kusý =

Slovak political scientist and politician (1931–2019)

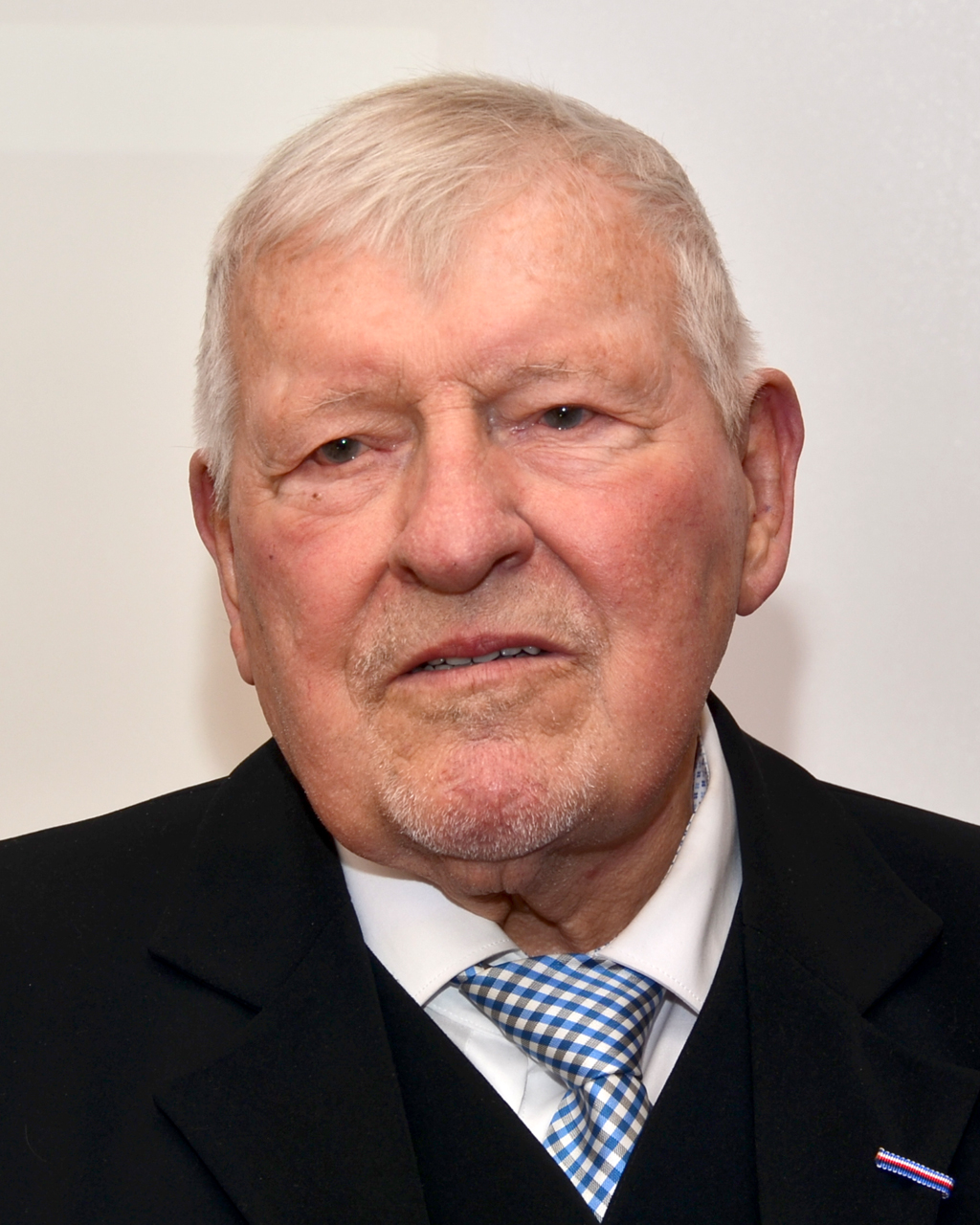

Miroslav Kusý (1 December 1931 – 13 February 2019) was a Slovak political scientist and politician. Described as a "dissident" of Czechoslovakia's communist regime, he was given an eight-month suspended sentence in November 1989 for an anti-government protest. After the Velvet Revolution, Kusý was appointed as chairman of the Federal Press and Information Office of Czechoslovakia.

After politics, Kusý became a professor in political science.

He died on 13 February 2019, at age of 87 from heart failure.
