= Jozef Burian =

Slovak politician (1961–2021)

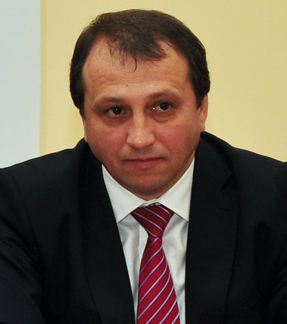
- Burian in 2012

Member of the National Council of Slovakia
- In office 2002–2020

State Secretary of the Ministry of Labor, Social Affairs and Family of the Slovak Republic
- In office 2012–2016

Personal details
- Born: 21 September 1961 Košice, Czechoslovakia
- Died: 24 December 2021 (aged 60)
- Party: SMER–SD

Jozef Burian (21 September 1961 – 24 December 2021) was a Slovak politician. A member of Direction – Slovak Social Democracy, he served in the National Council from 2002 to 2020. He died on 24 December 2021, at the age of 60.

== Political career ==
- 2002–2006: member of the National Council for SMER, deputy chairman of the Committee on Social Affairs and Housing of the National Council of the Slovak Republic;
- 2006–2010: Member of the National Council for SMER, Chairman of the Committee on Finance, Budget and Currency of the National Council of the Slovak Republic and member of the Permanent Delegation of the National Council of the Slovak Republic to the Assembly of the Western European Union;
- 2010–2012: Member of the National Council for SMER, Member of the Finance and Budget Committee of the National Council of the Slovak Republic;
- 2012–2016: State Secretary of the Ministry of Labour, Social Affairs and Family of the Slovak Republic;
- 2016–2020: member of the National Council of the Slovak Republic elected from the SMER-SD party. Candidate for 38th place. He received 2,994 valid preferential votes. He was a member of the Committee on Incompatibility of Positions and the Committee on Social Affairs of the National Council of the Slovak Republic.
