= Titus Zeman =

Slovak Roman Catholic priest

Blessed Titus Zeman SDB
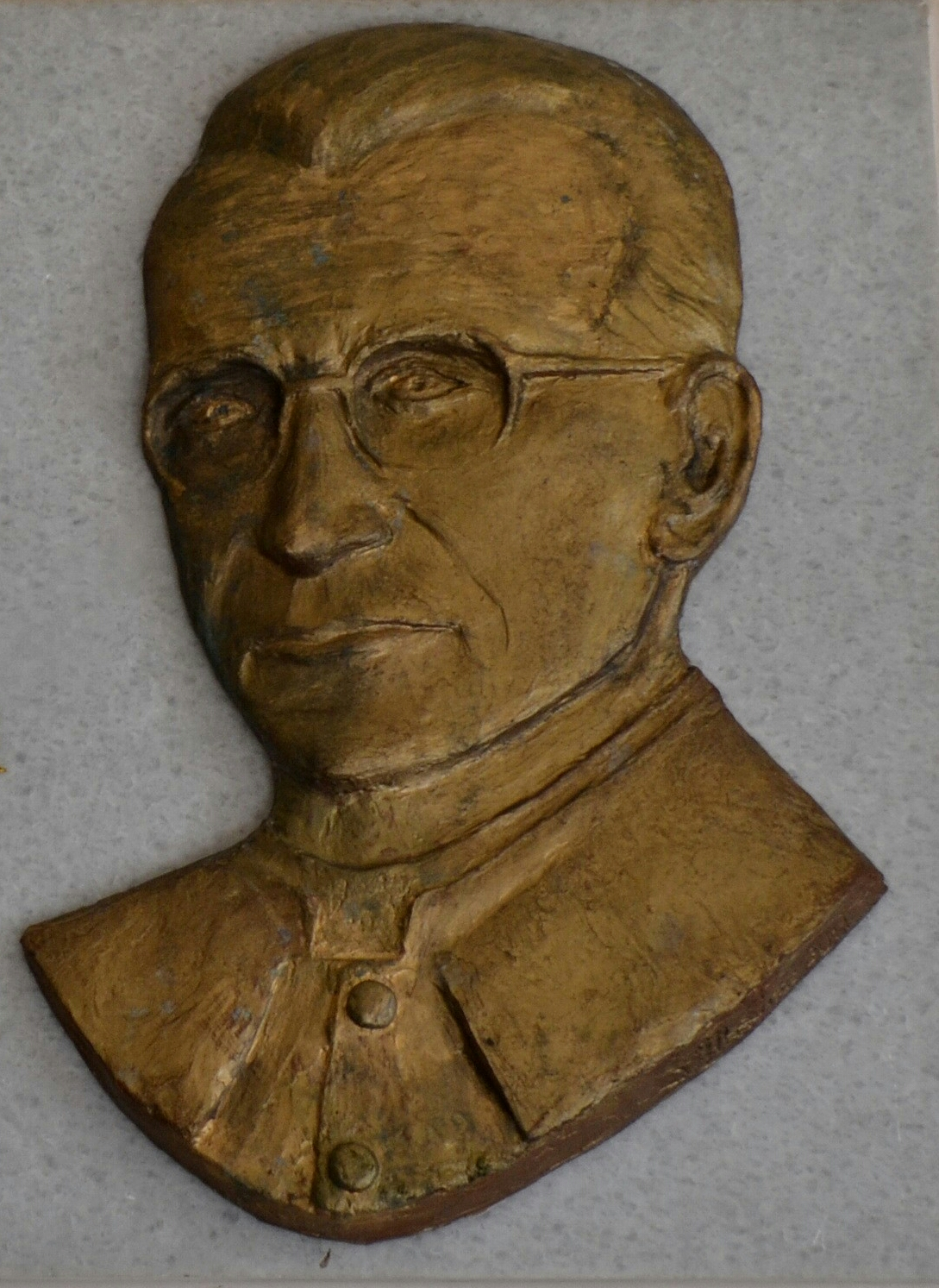

Martyr
- Born: 4 January 1915; Vajnory, Slovakia
- Died: 8 January 1969 (aged 54); Bratislava, Slovakia
- Venerated in: Roman Catholic Church
- Beatified: 30 September 2017, Bratislava, Slovakia by Cardinal Angelo Amato
- Feast: 8 January

Titus Zeman (4 January 1915 – 8 January 1969) was a Slovak Roman Catholic priest and a professed member of the Salesians of Don Bosco. Zeman studied in Italian cities prior to his ordination and worked in Slovakia to protect fellow Salesians after the communist regime outlawed religious orders. He was arrested after attempting to send Salesians out of the nation and was imprisoned from 1952 until 1964 and died due to poor health sustained from the prison conditions. He has been acclaimed as a defender of religious liberties.

Zeman was acclaimed a Servant of God in 2010 under Pope Benedict XVI after the canonization process commenced in Bratislava – the cause was taken with ascertaining whether Zeman had died "in odium fidei" (in hatred of the faith). Pope Francis approved his beatification on 27 February 2017; the beatification occurred in Bratislava on 30 September 2017.

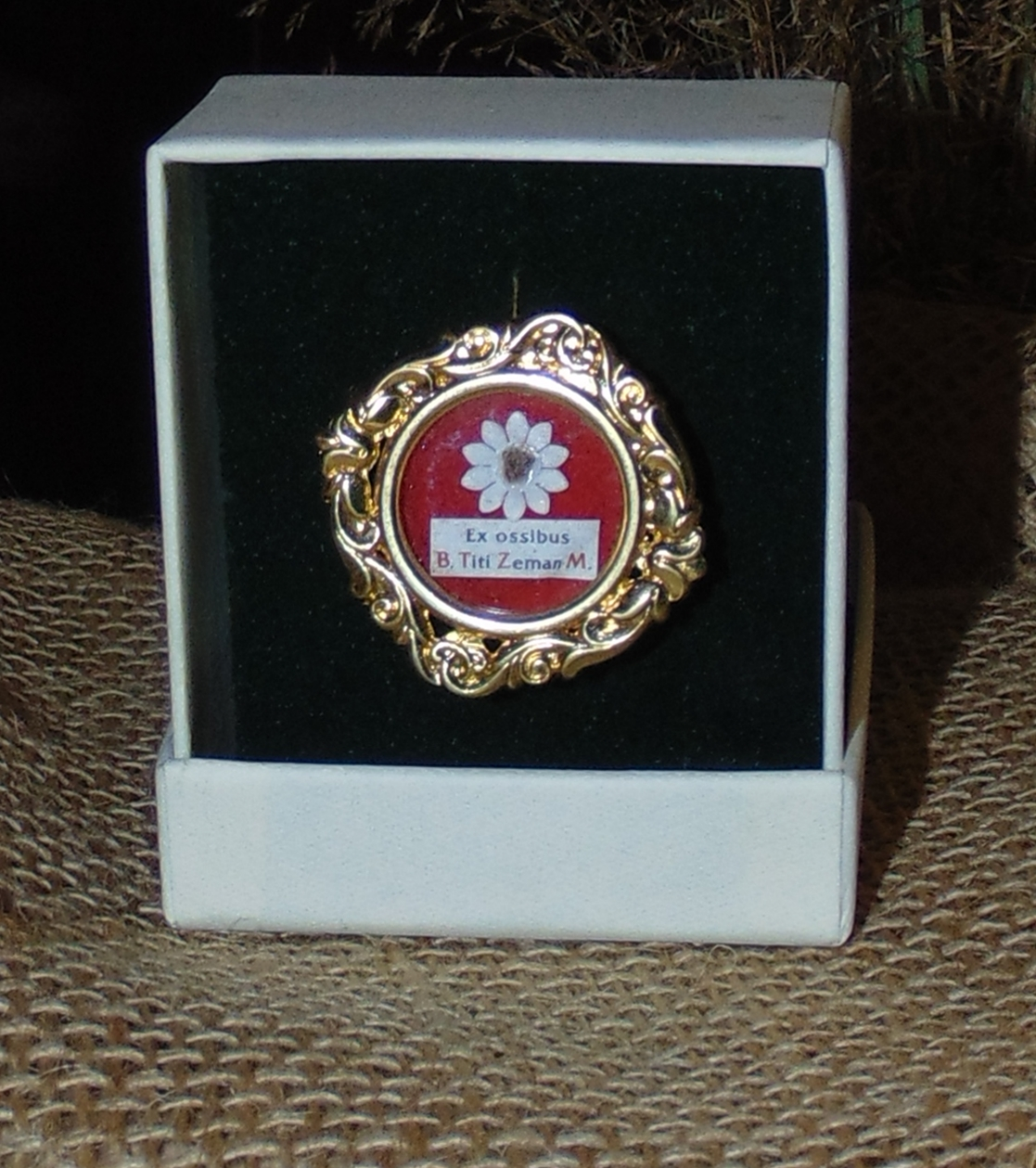
Relic of Titus Zeman in the church in Starý Smokovec

== Life ==
Titus Zeman was born in 1915 in Slovakia. From 1925 – when he was ten – he knew he wanted to become a priest and so finished his high school education at the Salesians of Don Bosco-run house at Šaštín before considering that path ahead.

He entered the Salesians novitiate in 1931 and made his first vows on 6 August 1932. On 7 March 1938 he made his solemn profession into the order at the Sacro Cuore di Gesù a Castro Pretorio in Rome. Zeman did theological studies for the priesthood at the Pontifica Università Gregoriana and then continued his studies in Chieri. He was ordained a priest in Turin on 23 June 1940 by Cardinal Maurilio Fossati. He celebrated his first Mass in his hometown on 4 August 1940 and until 1950 served as both a chaplain and catechist.

In April 1950 the communist regime forbade religious orders within its borders and began to send their members to concentration camps. Zeman arranged for Salesians to travel to Turin – despite it being a grave risk since it was illegal – so that these religious could complete their studies without fear of persecution or suppression. He organized two such expeditions (one in August 1950 and another on 23 October 1950) for over 60 Salesians. The third attempt in April 1951 saw him and others arrested. At his trial he was described as a traitor to the nation. He risked receiving the death sentence but, due to attenuating circumstances, on 22 February 1952 he was sentenced to imprisonment until 1977, and received parole on 10 March 1964, scarred from the suffering that he endured in prison. He was granted permission in 1968 to celebrate religious functions.

Zeman died in 1969 due to heart failure, with the harsh conditions of his imprisonment a contributing factor in his death. His remains were exhumed and moved to the local church in 2010.

== Beatification process ==
The diocesan process for the cause was inaugurated on 26 February 2010. Pope Francis approved the beatification on 27 February 2017 and the beatification occurred in Bratislava on 30 September 2017. The postulator assigned to the cause is the Salesian Pierluigi Cameroni.
