= Šance, Vrbovce =

Coordinates: 48°49′2″N 17°30′45″E

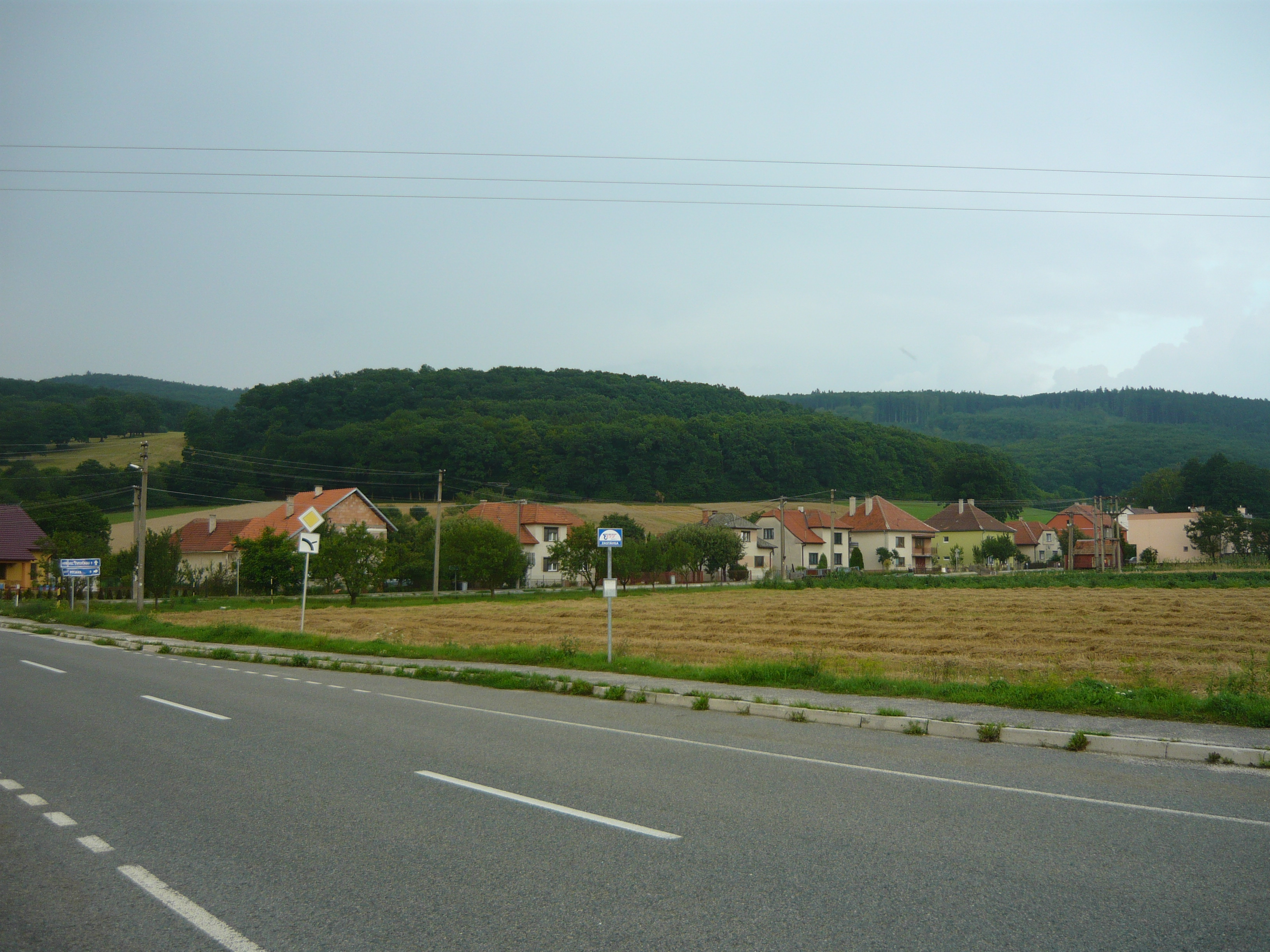
Šance,Vrbovce,Slovakia

Šance (until 1997 U Sabotů) is a hamlet in Vrbovce in the Trenčín Region of Slovakia.

== History ==
Šance was historically part of the Czech region of Moravia and until 24 July 1997 it belonged to the Moravian village of Javorník. A referendum was held in the settlement where most people expressed the wish to belong to Slovakia. Then, on 25 July 1997, along with some other land in the Czech Republic, it was incorporated to Slovakia on the basis of an interstate agreement in exchange for the Slovak part of the Sidonia settlement and some other Slovak lands, which caused considerable political controversy. In September 1998, U Sabotů was renamed Šance.

== Transport ==
A new state border is now formed by a wedge leading up the mountain saddle into the territory of the Czech Republic. At the top of the wedge, there is a railway station named Vrbovce on the railway line from Myjava to Javorník. The saddle passes Slovak road II/500 from Senica and Vrbovce, which connects the Czech road I/71 to Javorník. Along the settlements, the Slovak road II/499 from Myjava is connected to road II/500.
