= Ivan Hopta =

Slovak politician (1958–2021)

- Born: 19 September 1958
- Died: 21 December 2021 (aged 63)
- Occupation: Slovak politician
- Office: Member of the National Council
- Political party: Communist Party of Slovakia (2002–2006), Dawn (Slovakia)

Ivan Hopta (19 September 1958 – 21 December 2021) was a Slovak politician who served as a member of the National Council. Hopta was born on 19 September 1958. He died on 21 December 2021, at the age of 63.
