= Béla Bugár =

Slovak politician (born 1958)

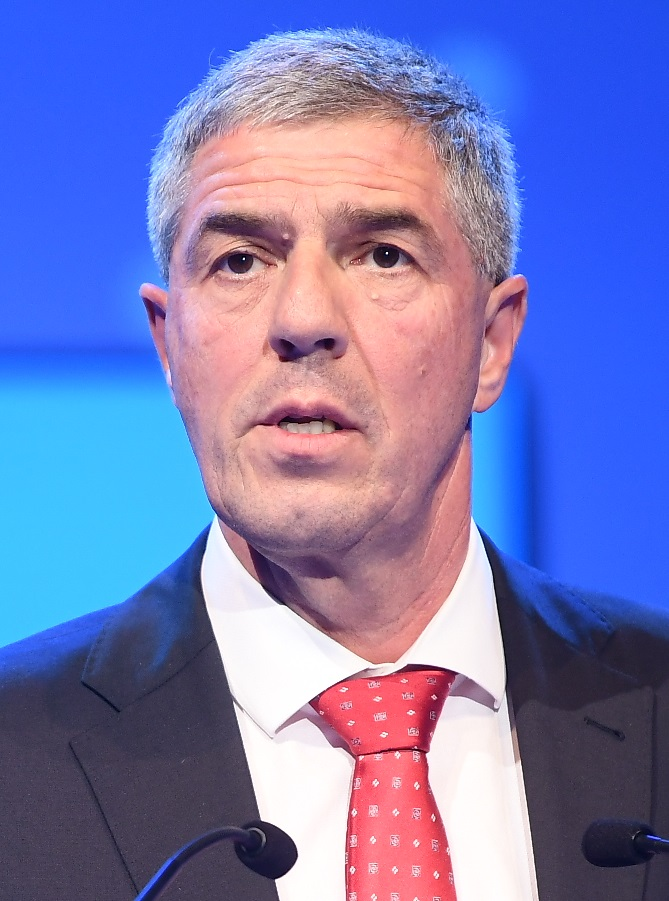
- Bugár in 2021

Speaker of the National Council
- Acting; 7 February 2006 – 4 July 2006
- President: Ivan Gašparovič
- Preceded by: Pavol Hrušovský
- Succeeded by: Pavol Paška

Deputy Speaker of the National Council
- In office 23 March 2016 – 20 March 2020
- Speaker: Andrej Danko
- In office 8 July 2010 – 4 April 2012
- Speaker: Richard Sulík; Pavol Hrušovský
- In office 15 October 2002 – 4 July 2006
- Speaker: Pavol Hrušovský

Member of the National Council
- In office 23 June 1992 – 20 March 2020

Member of the Federal Assembly (within Czechoslovakia)
- In office 1990–1992

Personal details
- Born: 7 July 1958 (age 68) Bratislava, Czechoslovakia (now Slovakia)
- Party: Hungarian Christian Democratic Movement (1990–1998); Party of the Hungarian Community (1998–2009); Most–Híd (2009–2021); Alliance (2021–2022); Most–Híd 2023 (2023–2026)
- Education: Slovak University of Technology

Béla Bugár (born 7 July 1958) is a Slovak mechanical engineer, retired politician and political pundit of Hungarian ethnicity. He served as Acting Speaker of the National Council of Slovakia in 2006. He also served as Deputy Speaker in three nonconsecutive terms (2002–2006, 2010–2012, and 2016–2020) and as a member of the National Council for nine consecutive terms from 1992 to 2020. He is considered the most influential figure in the history of Hungarian minority politics since the establishment of independent Slovakia in 1993.

Bugár, a mechanical engineer by training and profession, began his parliamentary career as a member of the Federal Assembly of Czechoslovakia from 1990 to 1992. He led the Hungarian Christian Democratic Movement from 1991 to 1998, followed by its successor, the Party of the Hungarian Coalition, from 1998 to 2007. In 2009, he founded his own party, Most–Híd, which he led until 2020, when he retired from both parliamentary and party politics. Since 2025, he has appeared on the TA3 television show O tom potom as a host and regular commentator.

== Life and career ==
He was the leader of Party of the Hungarian Coalition from 1998 until 2007, with Pál Csáky as his successor. Before the formation of the Party of the Hungarian Coalition in 1998, Bugár was the chairman of the Hungarian Christian Democratic Movement. Bugár has been an MP of the National Council of the Slovak Republic since 1992. He was its acting speaker from 7 February 2006 to 4 July 2006. Béla Bugár announced that he was going to retire from politics by 2010. However, on 30 June 2009 he founded a new political party, Most–Híd, whose goal was to stand for the Hungarians' interests in Slovakia while striving to work together with Slovaks. He was a member of the Most–Híd 2023 party from 2023 to 2026.

Political offices
Preceded by Pavol Hrušovský	Speaker of the National Council; Acting; 2006	Succeeded by Pavol Paška
