= Pavol Hrušovský =

Slovak politician

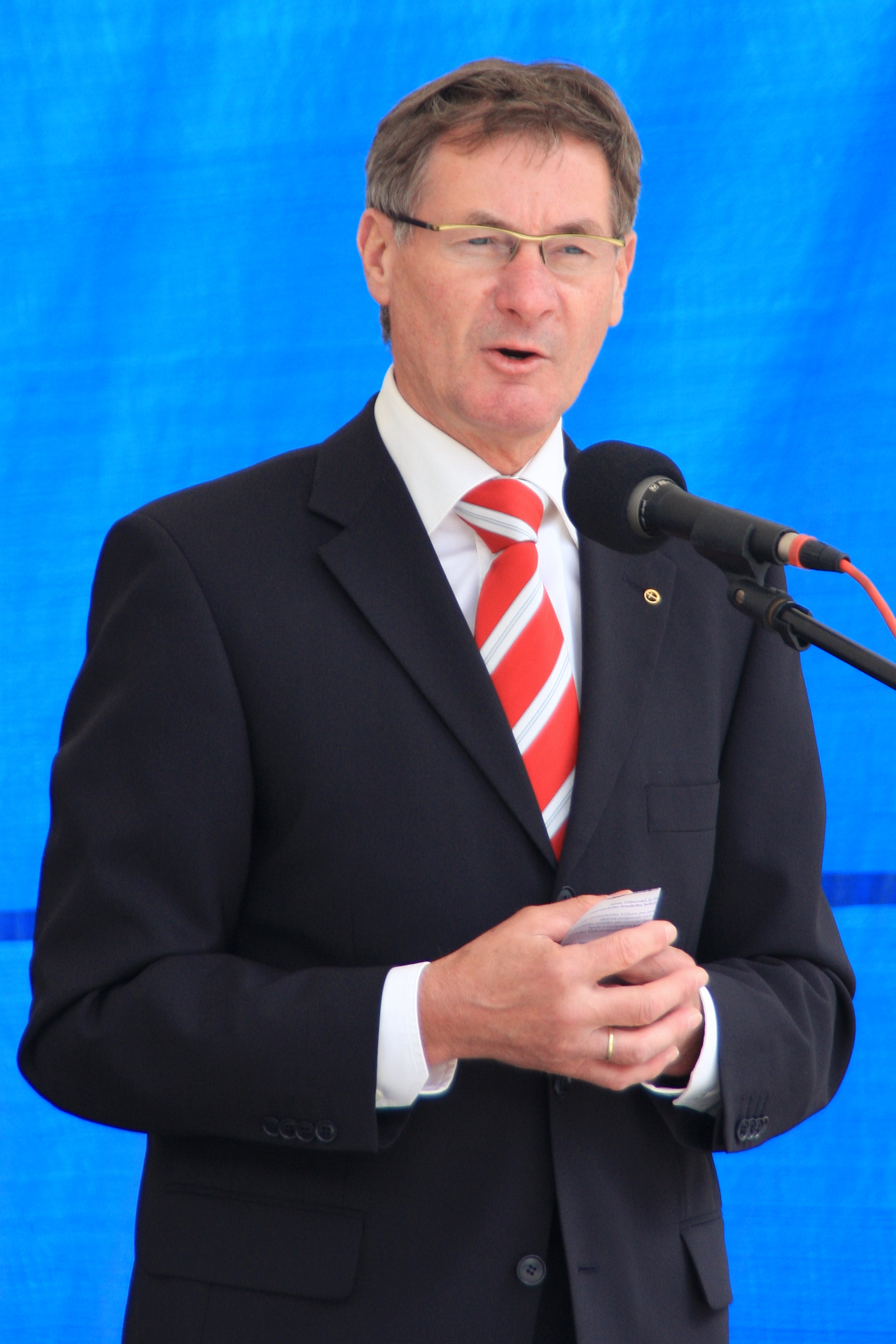

Speaker of the National Council
- In office 13 October 2011 – 4 April 2012
- Preceded by: Richard Sulík
- Succeeded by: Pavol Paška
- In office 15 October 2002 – 7 February 2006
- Preceded by: Jozef Migaš
- Succeeded by: Béla Bugár (acting)

Deputy Speaker of the National Council
- In office 8 July 2010 – 13 October 2011
- Speaker: Richard Sulík
- In office 30 October 1998 – 15 October 2002
- Speaker: Jozef Migaš

Member of the National Council
- In office 23 June 1992 – 23 March 2016

Member of the Federal Assembly (within Czechoslovakia)
- In office 1990–1992

Personal details
- Born: 9 June 1952 (age 74) Veľká Maňa, Czechoslovakia (now Slovakia)
- Party: Christian Democratic Movement (1990–1998, 1999–present)
- Other political affiliations: Slovak Democratic Coalition (1998–1999)
- Education: Comenius University

Pavol Hrušovský (born 9 June 1952) is a Slovak lawyer and retired politician who served as Speaker of the National Council of Slovakia from 2002 to 2006 and briefly again from 2011 to 2012. He also held the position of Deputy Speaker in two nonconsecutive terms (1998–2002 and 2010–2011) and was a member of the National Council for eight consecutive terms from 1992 to 2016. Hrušovský also ran for President of Slovakia in 2014 election, finishing sixth with 3.3% of the vote in the first round.

A lawyer by training and profession, Hrušovský began his political career as a member of the Federal Assembly of Czechoslovakia from 1990 to 1992. Since the foundation of the Christian Democratic Movement in 1990, he has been a member of the party, serving as its chairman from 2000 to 2009. He was also a member of the Slovak Democratic Coalition, an electoral alliance formed for the 1998 Slovak parliamentary election.

== Professional career ==
In 1978 he earned his degree at the Law Faculty of Comenius University in Bratislava, Slovakia.

After the conclusion of his study he worked in various economic organizations as a lawyer. In 1989 he became the head of the Legal Department of the "Jednota SD" cooperative in Nitra. In 1992 he became the head of the District Council in Nitra.

In 1989 he was co-opted for a deputy of the Federal Assembly (federal parliament) of Czechoslovakia. In the 1990 election, he was elected as a deputy of the Assembly, in which he worked in the Constitutional, Foreign Relations and Mandate and Immunity Committees.

Since the election in 1992 he has been a Member of the Slovak parliament. During the first election term of the National Council of the Slovak Republic (Slovak parliament) he was a member of the Constitutional and Mandate and Immunity Committees. In the second term he was a Deputy Speaker of the National Council. At the constituent session of the third election term he has been elected Speaker of the National Council.

== Political career ==
He entered politics after November 1989 and he became engaged in the Christian Democratic Movement (KDH), a member of which he has remained to this day.

In the September 1998 election he ran for the Parliament for the Slovak Democratic Coalition.

He was a member of the coalition from July 1998 to March 1999. In April 1999 at the Christian Democratic Movement convention, he was elected deputy leader of the movement for domestic politics. At the Christian Democratic Movement convention in Trenčín on 21 October 2000, he was elected the leader of Christian Democratic Movement. He replaced Ján Čarnogurský, who had been the leader of the Christian Democratic Movement since its inception (i.e. for ten years).

On 28 June 2013, the People’s Platform announced Hrušovský’s candidacy in the 2014 presidential election. In the first round of the election, he ultimately received 63,298 votes (3.33% of the votes cast) and finished in 6th place out of 14 candidates. Following his unsuccessful presidential bid, Hrušovský resigned from the position of chairman of the Christian Democratic Movement parliamentary group as well as from the Christian Democratic Movement presidency.

Political offices
Preceded by Richard Sulík	Speaker of the National Council; 2011–2012	Succeeded by Pavol Paška
