= Pavol Paška =

Slovak politician

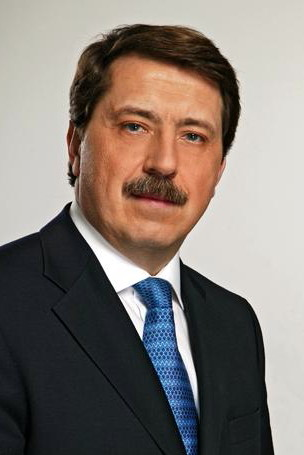

Speaker of the National Council
- In office 4 April 2012 – 24 November 2014
- President: Ivan Gašparovič; Andrej Kiska
- Preceded by: Pavol Hrušovský
- Succeeded by: Peter Pellegrini
- In office 4 July 2006 – 8 July 2010
- President: Ivan Gašparovič
- Preceded by: Béla Bugár (acting)
- Succeeded by: Richard Sulík

Member of the National Council
- In office 15 October 2002 – 24 November 2014

Personal details
- Born: 23 February 1958 Košice, Czechoslovakia
- Died: 6 April 2018 (aged 60) Košice, Slovakia
- Party: Direction – Social Democracy

Pavol Paška (23 February 1958, Košice – 6 April 2018, Košice) was a Slovak politician who served as Speaker of the National Council of the Slovak Republic from 2006 to 2010 and again from 2012 to 2014. He was a member of the Direction – Social Democracy (Smer-SD) party.

== Early life and education ==
Paška was born in Košice on 23 February 1958. He graduated from the Faculty of Arts of the Comenius University in Bratislava in 1985. His study fields included Marxist–Leninist philosophy and aesthetics. Prior to his university studies he worked for the State Company Zdroj in Košice.

After finishing his study he worked at Education and Culture Centre in Košice and at Self-Administration Office and later Municipal District Administration KVP in Košice. Paška became active in the business sphere in 1992 before entering politics in 1999.

== Political career ==
Paška was first elected as the deputy leader of Smer-SD, along with future minister of the interior Robert Kaliňák, at their annual congress in the western Slovak town of Hlohovec on 12 April 2003. He was re-elected as deputy chairman at the party's national congress in Trenčín on 30 September.

=== Speaker of Parliament ===
His party, Direction – Social Democracy, led by Robert Fico, won the June 2006 parliamentary elections with 29.1% of the votes and formed a coalition with the People's Party - Movement for a Democratic Slovakia (ĽS-HZDS) and the Slovak National Party (SNS). Support for Direction – Social Democracy party after the elections rose even higher, oscillating in the summer 2007 opinion polls around 40%.

In the wake of the election, the new Slovak parliament elected Paška as its new speaker, with 98 out of 148 MPs present supporting the nomination. Parliament also elected three deputy speakers - Miroslav Číž from Smer-SD, Anna Belousovová from the SNS party and Viliam Veteška from the HZDS. Paška said he "wanted consensus, cooperation, and respect to dominate in the new parliament".

One of his first actions as speaker of parliament was to make parliamentary sessions public through live broadcasts on the public service Slovak Television (STV) channel, to "prevent information about parliamentary sessions being manipulated." In 2007 Paška stated he would introduce a proposal for the complete cancellation of ministers of parliament's immunity, claiming it represented "an abuse of power".

In November 2007, Paska faced a motion of no confidence in parliament. The opposition parties wanted Paška to be fired for his handling of a controversial law. The opposition took issue with Paska's interference in the amendment to the social insurance law, approved by the parliament in a chaotic vote with two contradictory amending proposals. The draft bill was supposed to be published on the internet within three days after the vote. Paška admitted that he ordered the legislative department to ignore parliament's vote and publish a version that did not the original proposal. Katarína Kližanová Rýsová, spokesperson from the Smer-SD party called the motion to dismiss Paska "ridiculous". On 27 November Paska survived the motion. Out of 111 MPs present in 150-member parliament, 59 supported the motion. The opposition would have needed 76 votes to succeed in its attempt to oust the Speaker of Parliament.

== Life outside politics ==
Paška was married and had two sons, Michal and Matus. In November 2015 his nephews Martin Paška, the director at Bytový podnik mesta Košice (BPMK) the city housing management company in Košice; his brother Branislav, an employee at Košice University Hospital and their third brother Maroš, a police officer, attended a birthday party. After returning from the party, they first harassed and then brutally attacked a woman and her partner in front of the pizza restaurant. After the video of the attack leaked to the public, Martin Paška, Branislav Paška and Maroš Paška have lost their respective jobs in public sector. After claiming they were innocent, they were sentenced in 2019 to financial penalty and probation for six months.

He was a member of Prague Society for International Cooperation, a respected NGO whose main goal is the development of a new generation of responsible, well-informed leaders and thinkers and a Member of the Advisory Board of the Global Panel Foundation - America.

Political offices
Preceded by Pavol Hrušovský	Speaker of the National Council; 2012–2014	Succeeded by Peter Pellegrini
