= List of speakers of Slovak parliaments =

The chairman of the National Council of the Slovak Republic (Slovak: Predseda Národnej rady Slovenskej republiky), sometimes also referred to as the chairman of parliament, is the elected presiding officer of the National Council of the Slovak Republic, the highest legislative body of the country. The office was formally established on 1 January 1993 following the dissolution of Czechoslovakia and the establishment of an independent Slovakia. Since 26 March 2025, the chairman has been Richard Raši of Hlas.

== List of office-holders ==
=== Gallery ===
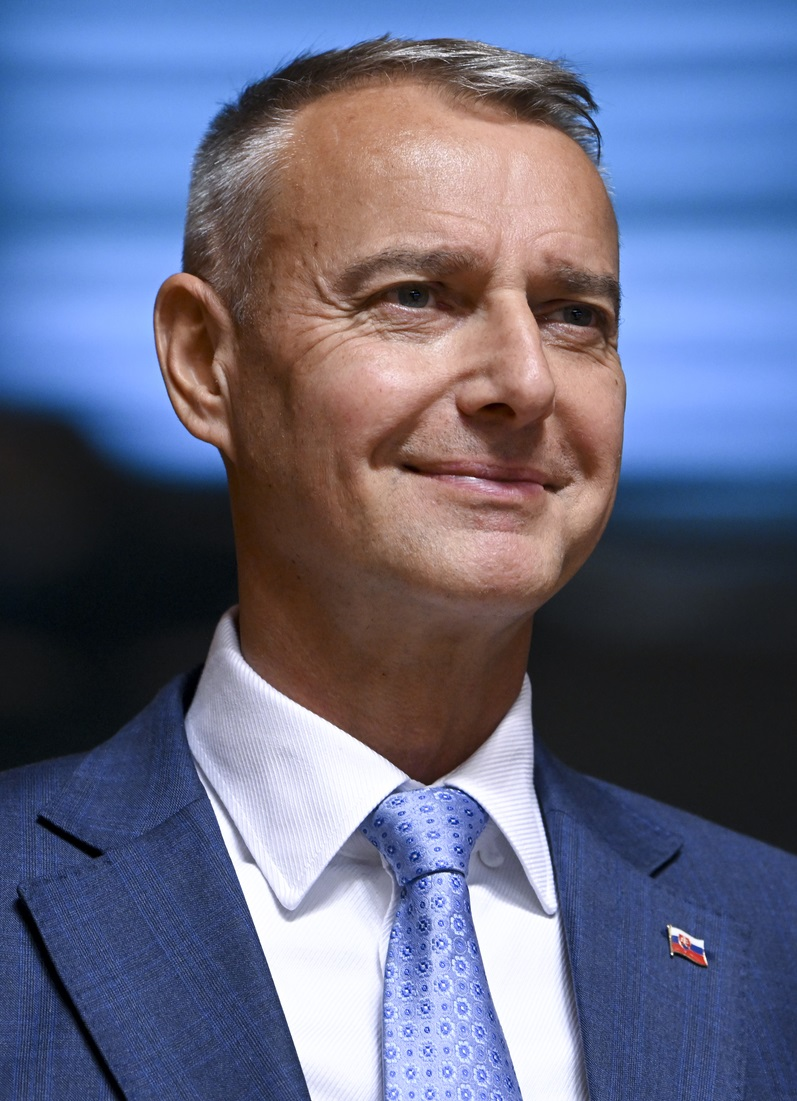
Richard Raši, incumbent chairman of the National Council

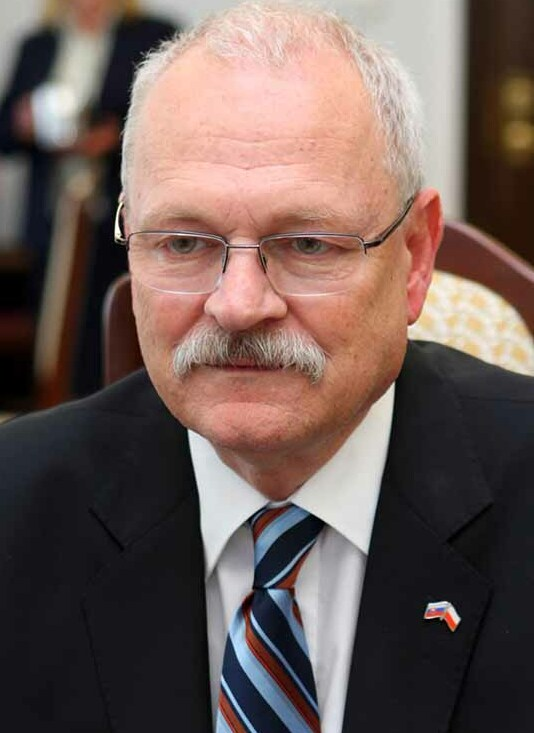
Ivan Gašparovič, inaugural office-holder and longest-consecutively serving chairman

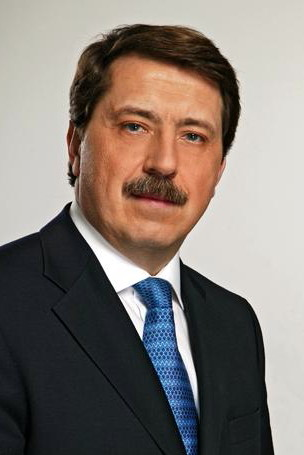
Pavol Paška, longest-serving chairman in total

=== List ===
Name (Birth–Death)	Took office	Left office	Duration	Party	Election
Ivan Gašparovič (born 1941)	1 January 1993	3 November 1994	5 years, 301 days	ĽS–HZDS	1992
Ivan Gašparovič (born 1941)	3 November 1994	29 October 1998	5 years, 301 days	ĽS–HZDS	1994
Jozef Migaš (born 1954)	29 October 1998	15 October 2002	3 years, 351 days	SDĽ	1998
Pavol Hrušovský (born 1952)	15 October 2002	7 February 2006	3 years, 115 days	KDH	2002
Béla Bugár (born 1958) acting	7 February 2006	4 July 2006	147 days	SMK	–
Pavol Paška (1958−2018)	4 July 2006	8 July 2010	4 years, 4 days	Smer	2006
Richard Sulík (born 1968)	8 July 2010	13 October 2011	1 year, 97 days	SaS	2010
Pavol Hrušovský (born 1952)	13 October 2011	4 April 2012	174 days	KDH	2010
Pavol Paška (1958−2018)	4 April 2012	24 November 2014	2 years, 234 days	Smer	2012
Peter Pellegrini (born 1975)	25 November 2014	23 March 2016	1 year, 119 days	Smer	2012
Andrej Danko (born 1974)	23 March 2016	20 March 2020	3 years, 363 days	SNS	2016
Boris Kollár (born 1965)	20 March 2020	25 October 2023	3 years, 219 days	We Are Family	2020
Peter Pellegrini (born 1975)	25 October 2023	7 April 2024	165 days	Hlas	2023
Peter Žiga (born 1972) acting	7 April 2024	26 March 2025	353 days	Hlas	–
Richard Raši (born 1971)	26 March 2025	Incumbent	1 year, 178 days	Hlas	2023

== List of Speakers of previous Slovak legislatures ==
=== Slovak National Council (1848 – 1849; in rebellion during the Slovak Uprising) ===
- Jozef Miloslav Hurban (1848 – 1849)

=== Revolutionary Executive Committee of the Slovak Soviet Republic (1919; in rebellion in eastern Slovakia) ===
- no particular leader (6 June 1919 – 20 June 1919)

=== Land Assembly of the Slovak Land (1928–1938; within Czechoslovakia) ===
- Land President acted as Chairman of the Assembly.
- Ján Drobný (28 June 1928 – 1 January 1931)
- Jozef Országh (1 January 1931 – 1938)
- Julián Šimko (1938 – 1939)

=== Assembly of the Slovak Land (1939; within Czechoslovakia) ===
- Martin Sokol (18 January 1939 – 14 March 1939)

=== Slovak Assembly / Assembly of the Slovak Republic (1939 – 1945; independent Slovakia) ===
- Martin Sokol (14 March 1939 – April 1945)

=== President of the Presidium of the Slovak National Council (1944 – 1945; in rebellion during the Slovak National Uprising) ===
- Presidium of the Slovak National Council (at that time Vavro Šrobár, Gustáv Husák, Ján Ursíny) (1 September 1944 – 5 September 1944)
- Karol Šmidke and Vavro Šrobár (5 September 1944 – ?23 October 1944)
- Presidium of the Slovak National Council (? – 11 April 1945)

=== Slovak National Council (called the National Council of the Slovak Republic since 1 October 1992) (1945 – 1992; within Czechoslovakia) ===
- Jozef Lettrich (11 April 1945 – 14 September 1945)
- Karol Šmidke and Jozef Lettrich (14 September 1945 – 26 February 1948)
- Karol Šmidke (acting) (26 February 1948 – 12 March 1948)
- Karol Šmidke (12 March 1948 – 14 July 1950)
- František Kubač (14 July 1950 – 15 June 1958)
- Ľudovít Benada (23 June 1958 – 14 July 1960)
- Rudolf Strechaj (14 July 1960 – 28 July 1962) – at the same time the highest executive officer in Slovakia
- Jozef Lenárt (31 October 1962 – 20 March* 1963) – at the same time the highest executive officer in Slovakia [*other sources September]
- Michal Chudík (23 March* 1963 – 29 December 1968) – at the same time the highest executive officer in Slovakia
- Ondrej Klokoč (acting) (14 March 1968 – 27 June 1968)
- Ondrej Klokoč (27 June 1968 – 16 March 1975)
- Viliam Šalgovič (26 March 1975 – 30 November 1989)
- Rudolf Schuster (30 November 1989 – 26 June 1990)
- František Mikloško (26 June 1990 – 23 June 1992)
- Ivan Gašparovič (23 June 1992 – 31 December 1992)

== See also ==
- National Council (Slovakia)
