= 2023 in Slovakia =

- Decades: 2000s; 2010s; 2020s
- See also: Other events of 2023; History of Slovakia • Years

Events in the year 2023 in Slovakia.

== Incumbents ==
- President: Zuzana Čaputová
- Prime Minister: Eduard Heger (until 15 May), Ľudovít Ódor (15 May to 25 October), Robert Fico (starting 25 October)

== Events ==
- 21 January – 2023 Slovak constitutional referendum: Slovaks vote in a referendum to determine whether early elections can be called before the customary end of the mandate.
- 22 January – Members of former government coalition agree to hold early election on 30 September 2023, before the end of the parliamentary term in February 2024.
- 23 February – Four people are killed after a plane crashes near Trenčianske Stankovce, Trenčín Region.
- 7 May – President Zuzana Čaputová appoints a technocratic cabinet due to long-term political crisis started by the government losing a vote of confidence in December 2022.
- 19 June – The Slovak parliament voted with the support of 111 of 150 MPs to put the right to use cash in the Constitution of Slovakia. The amendment was proposed by the Sme Rodina party.
- 15 September – The Slovak government ends the State of Emergency due to the COVID-19 pandemic declared on 11 March 2020.
- 30 September – 2023 Slovak parliamentary election: Slovaks go to the polls to elect 150 members of the National Council.
- 11 October – Smer leader Robert Fico agrees to form a coalition government with the left-wing Hlas and ultranationalist Slovak National Party, paving the way for Fico to become Prime Minister of Slovakia for a fourth time.
- 12 October – The Party of European Socialists (PES) suspended Smer-SD and Hlas-SD over their plans to enter into coalition with SNS, which the PES views as a "radical-right party".
- 25 October – President Zuzana Čaputová inaugurates the Fico's Fourth Cabinet.
- 21 November – The Fico's Fourth Cabinet passes the confidence vote in the parliament.

== Art and entertainment ==
- List of Slovak submissions for the Academy Award for Best International Feature Film

== Deaths ==
- 7 January: Miroslav Celler, 31, squash player.
- 19 January Aranka Szentpétery, 89, actress.
- 23 January: Jozef Dravecký, 75, diplomat, ambassador to Bulgaria (1993–1998), Latvia and Lithuania (2000–2005), and the Holy See (2007–2013).
- 1 February: Jozef Čapla, 84, ice hockey player (HC Slovan Bratislava, HC Dukla Jihlava, Augsburger EV).
- 11 February: Ivan Kováč, 74, middle-distance runner and radio sports commentator.
- 12 February: Miloš Janoušek, 70, folk musician.
- 13 February: Milan Hamada, 89, literary critic.
- 21 February: Eva Siracká, 96, physician, president of the League Against Cancer.
- 22 February:
  - Viera Gašparíková, 94, writer, folklorist and Slavist.
  - Stanislav Štefkovič, 93, decathlete.
- 24 February: Juraj Jakubisko, 84, film director (Birds, Orphans and Fools, The Millennial Bee, The Feather Fairy) and screenwriter.
- 12 March: Ondrej Šima, 86, Olympic sport shooter (1968).
- 13 March: Karol Mikuláš, 100, miner, partisan and political prisoner.
- 16 March: Helen Vari, 91, Czechoslovak-born Canadian philanthropist.
- 20 March: Viliam Roth, 81, journalist and politician, minister without portfolio of Czechoslovakia (1989).
- 31 March: Stanislav Párnický, 77, film director.
- 12 April: Radoslav Kunzo, 48, footballer (Inter Bratislava, Kapfenberger SV). (body discovered on this date)
- 20 April: Marek Fila, 63, mathematician.
- 5 May: Ján Vilikovský, 85, translator and diplomat, ambassador to the United Kingdom (1992–1996).
- 17 May: Livia Bitton-Jackson, 92, Czechoslovak-born American-Israeli author and Holocaust survivor.
- 23 May: Alojz Tkáč, 89, Roman Catholic prelate, bishop (1990–1995) and archbishop (1995–2010) of Košice.
- 24 May:
  - Jack Martin Händler, 75, conductor and violinist.
  - Dano Heriban, 43, actor (The Man Who Stood in the Way).
- 27 May: Miroslav Belanský, 81, agronomist, minister of agriculture (1989–1990).
- 29 May:
  - Thomas Buergenthal, 89, Czechoslovak-born American international lawyer and law school dean, judge of the International Court of Justice (2000–2010).
  - Etela Studeníková, 77, archaeologist.
- 30 May: Milka Zimková, 71, actress and screenwriter (She Grazed Horses on Concrete).
- 25 June: Ján Zvonár, 72, medical doctor and politician, MP (2006–2010).
- 22 July: Adolf Scherer, 85, footballer (CH Bratislava, Nîmes, Czechoslovakia national team).
- 27 July: Ján Polgár, 94, footballer (Dynamo ČSD Košice, Křídla vlasti Olomouc, Tatran Prešov). (death announced on this date)
- 31 July: Dušan Velič, 56, chemist and politician.
- 8 August: Dušan Kaprálik, 75, actor (The Teacher, Old-Timers).
- 19 August: Vašo Patejdl, 68, musician and composer (Elán).
- 27 August: Alojz Rakús, 76, politician, minister of health (1990–1992), MP (1998–2002).
- 11 September: Martin Hámor, 80, Olympic archer (1992).
- 1 October: Patricia Janečková, 25, soprano.
- 12 October: Eva Rysová, 91, actress.
- 21 October: Alexander Ilečko, 86, sculptor.
- 25 October: Dobroslav Trnka, 59, lawyer, prosecutor general (2004–2011).
- 20 November: Martina Lubyová, 56, politician, minister of education (2017–2020).
- 22 November: Barbara Haščáková, 43, singer.
- 14 December:
  - Rudolf Hrubý, 69, businessman (ESET), president of HC Slovan Bratislava.
  - Tomáš Janovic, 86, writer, playwright and poet.

== See also ==
- 2023 in the European Union
- 2023 in Europe
