= Mikoláš =

Mikoláš or Mikolas is both a given name and a surname. Notable people with the name include:

- Mikoláš Aleš (1852–1913), Czech painter
- Mikolas Josef (born Mikoláš Josef 1995), Czech singer
- Doug Mikolas (born 1961), American football player
- Josef Mikoláš (1938–2015), Czech ice hockey player
- Miles Mikolas (born 1988), American baseball player

== See also ==
- Mikuláš
- Mikola
