= Dravecky =

Dravecky is a surname. Notable people with the surname include:

- Dave Dravecky (born 1956), American baseball player
- Jozef Dravecký (1947–2023), Slovak mathematician and diplomat
- Vladimír Dravecký (born 1985), Slovak ice hockey player
