= Mikuláš =

Mikuláš or Mikulas is a given name and a surname, equivalent to the English name Nicholas. Notable people with the name include:

== Given name ==
- Mikuláš Dzurinda (born 1956), Slovak politician, Prime Minister of Slovakia from 1998 to 2006
- Mikuláš of Hus (died 1420), Bohemian politician and representative of the Hussite movement
- Mikuláš Galanda (1895–1938), Slovak painter, illustrator
- Mikuláš of Kadaň (1350–1419), Bohemian imperial clockmaker who designed the clock machine of Prague Orloj together with Jan Šindel
- Mikuláš Konopka (born 1979), Slovak Olympic shot putter

== Surname ==
- Karol Mikuláš (1922–2023), Slovak miner and antifascist fighter
- Peter Mikuláš, Slovak opera and concert singer in the bass voice range and a singing teacher
