= Miloš Janoušek =

Slovak folk musician (1953–2023)

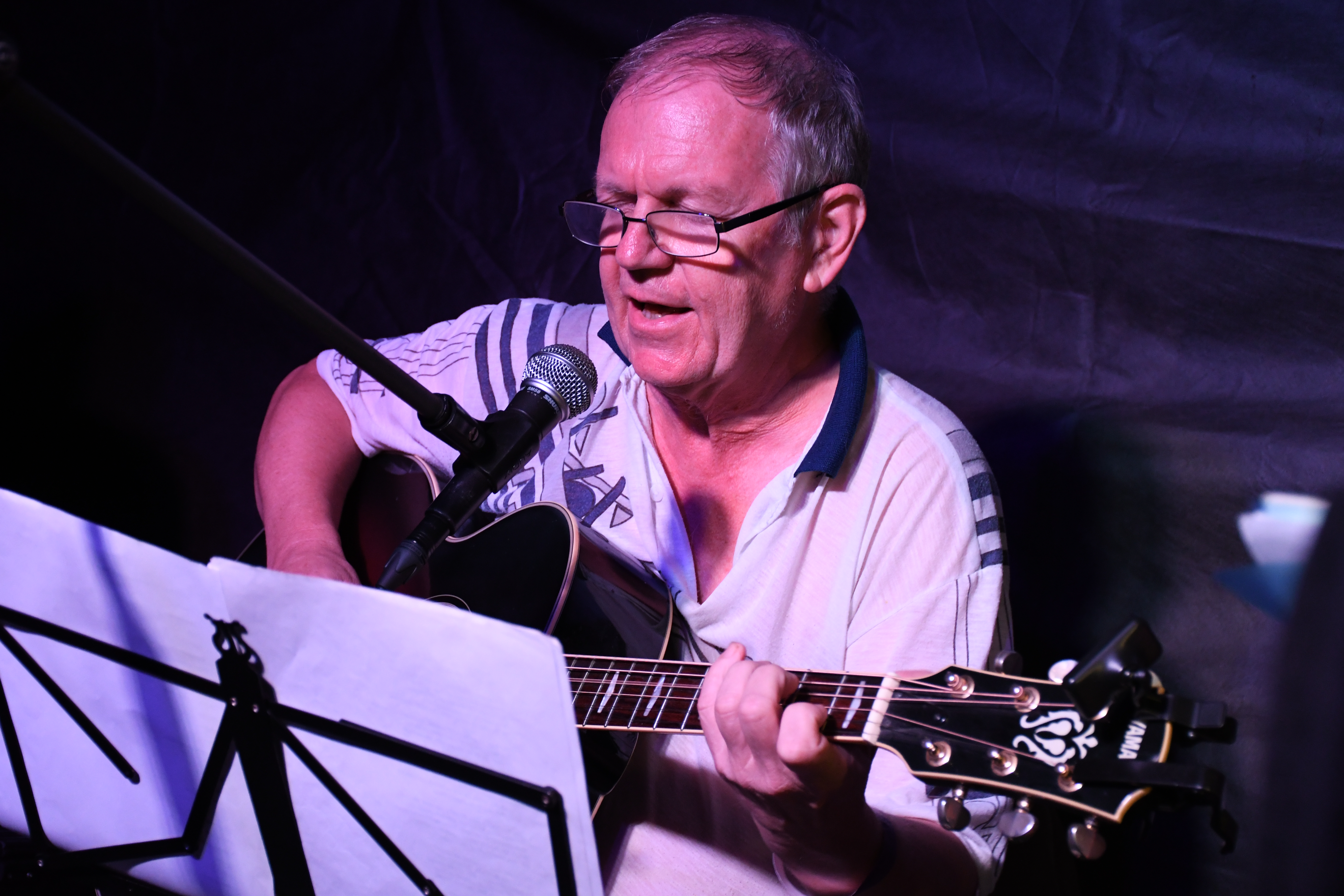

Background information
- Born: 16 July 1952; Bratislava, Czechoslovakia
- Died: 12 February 2023 (aged 70) Bratislava, Slovakia
- Genres: Folk, folkrock
- Instruments: Guitar, flute
- Labels: Opus, Pavian Records, Indies Happy Trails

Miloš Janoušek (16 July 1952 – 12 February 2023) was a Slovak folk singer and music publicist.

Janoušek was born on 16 July 1952 in Bratislava. While studying medicine at the Charles University, he composed and performed music with various amateur theatres in Prague. Following his graduation, he started composing music for professional theatres as well, mainly for the Andrej Bagar Theatre in Nitra.

Janoušek was a co-founder of the association of Slovak folk musicians Slnovrat and a member of the folk band Jednofázové kvasenie. In 1976, he performed along with other folk, jazz and rock musicians at a Youth Concert in Pezinok, which led to a rise of popularity of "Western" music in Slovakia.

From 1991 to 1999, Janoušek was involved in development TV programs about folk music for the Slovak Television. In 1996 he wrote a book Folk in Slovakia mapping the history of folk music in the country.

In addition to his cultural activities, Janoušek worked as a medical doctor before his retirement in 2022.

Janoušek died of a stroke in Bratislava on 12 February 2023, at the age of 70.
