= Alojz Rakús =

Slovak politician (1947–2023)

Minister of Healthcare
- In office 27 June 1990 – 24 June 1992
- Prime Minister: Vladimír Mečiar; Ján Čarnogurský
- Preceded by: office created
- Succeeded by: Viliam Soboňa

Personal details
- Born: 14 May 1947 (age 79) Trnava, Czechoslovakia
- Died: 27 August 2023 (aged 76)
- Party: KDH (1990–2008); KDS (2008–2014)
- Education: Comenius University (1971)
- Occupation: Psychiatrist

Alojz Rakús (14 May 1947 – 27 August 2023) was a Slovak psychiatrist and politician. He served as the Minister of Health in the first two democratic governments of Slovakia following the end of the Communist regime. From 1998 to 2002 he was a Member of the National Council.

== Life and career ==
Rakús was born in Trnava, Czechoslovakia (now Slovakia), on 14 May 1947. He studied medicine at the Comenius University, graduating in 1971. In addition to medical practice, he remained active in the academia, teaching at the Comenius University (1971–1982) and at the Slovak Medical University (from 1982 until his death).

From 1990 Rakús 1992 he served as the Health minister in the governments of Ivan Čarnogurský and Vladimír Mečiar. As the minister, he allowed medical staff to opt out from performing medical abortions and unsuccessfully attempted to limit the access to abortion. He was also a deputy of the Federal Assembly, until the dissolution of Czechoslovakia. From 1998 to 2002 he again served as the MP of the National Council representing the Christian Democratic Movement (KDH).

Rakús was among the most hardline conservative members of KDH. For example, he controversially claimed 52% of homosexuals could be cured of their condition and that tolerance to homosexuality could lead to more people being homosexual. In 2008, he left KDH and joined the four hardliner KDH MPs to co-found the Conservative Democrats of Slovakia. In 2012, he ran as a non-party candidate on OĽaNO party list in 2012 elections.

Alojz Rakús died on 27 August 2023, at the age of 76. He was Roman Catholic.
