= List of diplomatic missions of Slovakia =

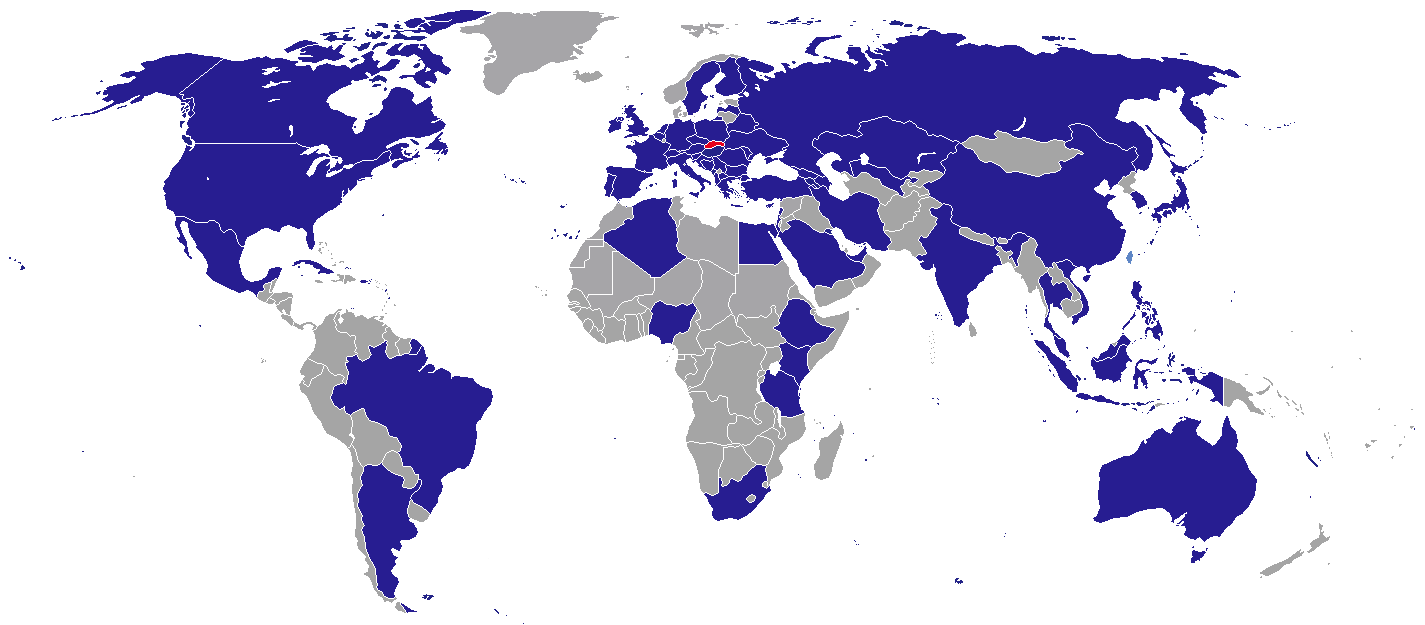
Countries with Slovak diplomatic missions

This is a list of diplomatic missions of Slovakia, excluding honorary consulates. The Slovak Ministry of Foreign Affairs oversees the operation of these missions.

== Current missions ==
=== Africa ===
Host country	Host city	Mission	Concurrent accreditation	Ref.
Algeria	Algiers	Embassy	Countries: Mauritania; Niger; Senegal; Tunisia	
Egypt	Cairo	Embassy	Countries: Libya; Oman; Sudan; Yemen	
Ethiopia	Addis Ababa	Embassy	Countries: Central African Republic; Djibouti	
Kenya	Nairobi	Embassy	Countries: Comoros; Eritrea; Rwanda; Seychelles; Somalia; South Sudan; Uganda; International Organizations: United Nations; United Nations Environment Programme; United Nations Human Settlements Programme	
Nigeria	Abuja	Embassy	Countries: Benin; Burkina Faso; Chad; Gambia; Ghana; Guinea; Ivory Coast; Liberia; Mali; Sierra Leone; Togo	
South Africa	Pretoria	Embassy	Countries: Botswana; Eswatini; Lesotho; Madagascar; Mauritius; Mozambique; Namibia; Zimbabwe	
Tanzania	Dar Es Salaam	Embassy	Countries: Burundi; Cameroon; Congo-Brazzaville; Congo-Kinshasa; Equatorial Guinea; Gabon; Malawi; Zambia	

=== Americas ===
Host country	Host city	Mission	Concurrent accreditation	Ref.
Argentina	Buenos Aires	Embassy	Countries: Chile; Bolivia; Paraguay; Peru; Uruguay	
Brazil	Brasília	Embassy	Countries: Colombia; Ecuador; Guyana; Suriname; Venezuela	
Canada	Ottawa	Embassy		
Cuba	Havana	Embassy	Countries: Antigua and Barbuda; Bahamas; Barbados; Dominica; Dominican Republic; Haiti; Jamaica; Saint Kitts and Nevis; Saint Lucia; Saint Vincent and the Grenadines; Trinidad and Tobago	
Mexico	Mexico City	Embassy	Countries: Belize; Costa Rica; El Salvador; Guatemala; Honduras; Nicaragua; Panama	
United States	Washington, D.C.	Embassy	International Organizations: Organization of American States (Note: Accredited as an observer mission.)	
United States	New York City	Consulate-General	International Organizations: Organization of American States	

=== Asia ===
Host country	Host city	Mission	Concurrent accreditation	Ref.
Armenia	Yerevan	Embassy		
Azerbaijan	Baku	Embassy		
China	Beijing	Embassy	Countries: Mongolia	
China	Shanghai	Consulate-General	Countries: Mongolia	
Georgia	Tbilisi	Embassy		
India	New Delhi	Embassy	Countries: Bangladesh; Bhutan; Maldives; Nepal; Sri Lanka	
Indonesia	Jakarta	Embassy	Countries: Papua New Guinea; Singapore; Timor-Leste; International Organizations: Association of Southeast Asian Nations	
Iran	Tehran	Embassy	Countries: Afghanistan; Pakistan	
Israel	Tel Aviv	Embassy		
Japan	Tokyo	Embassy	Countries: Marshall Islands; Micronesia; Palau	
Kazakhstan	Astana	Embassy	Countries: Kyrgyzstan	
Kuwait	Kuwait City	Embassy		
Lebanon	Beirut	Embassy	Countries: Iraq; Jordan; Syria	
Malaysia	Kuala Lumpur	Embassy	Countries: Brunei	
Philippines	Manila	Embassy		
Saudi Arabia	Riyadh	Embassy	Countries: Bahrain; Qatar	
South Korea	Seoul	Embassy		
Republic of China (Taiwan)	Taipei	Economic & Cultural Office		
Thailand	Bangkok	Embassy	Countries: Cambodia; Laos; Myanmar	
Turkey	Ankara	Embassy		
Turkey	Istanbul	Consulate-General		
United Arab Emirates	Abu Dhabi	Embassy		
Uzbekistan	Tashkent	Embassy	Countries: Tajikistan; Turkmenistan	
Vietnam	Hanoi	Embassy		

=== Europe ===
Host country	Host city	Mission	Concurrent accreditation	Ref.
Albania	Tirana	Embassy		
Austria	Vienna	Embassy		
Belarus	Minsk	Embassy		
Belgium	Brussels	Embassy	Countries: Luxembourg	
Bosnia and Herzegovina	Sarajevo	Embassy		
Bulgaria	Sofia	Embassy		
Croatia	Zagreb	Embassy		
Cyprus	Nicosia	Embassy		
Czechia	Prague	Embassy		
Finland	Helsinki	Embassy	Countries: Estonia	
France	Paris	Embassy	Countries: Monaco	
Germany	Berlin	Embassy		
Germany	Munich	Consulate-General		
Greece	Athens	Embassy		
Holy See (Note: The Slovak Embassy to the Holy See is located outside Vatican territory in Rome.)	Rome	Embassy	Sovereign entity: Sovereign Military Order of Malta	
Hungary	Budapest	Embassy		
Hungary	Békéscsaba	Consulate-General		
Ireland	Dublin	Embassy		
Italy	Rome	Embassy	Countries: Malta; San Marino; International Organizations: Food and Agriculture Organization; International Fund for Agricultural Development; World Food Programme	
Latvia	Riga	Embassy	Countries: Lithuania	
Moldova	Chişinău	Embassy		
Montenegro	Podgorica	Embassy		
Netherlands	The Hague	Embassy	International Organizations: OPCW	
North Macedonia	Skopje	Embassy		
Poland	Warsaw	Embassy		
Portugal	Lisbon	Embassy	Countries: Angola; Cape Verde; Guinea-Bissau; São Tomé and Príncipe	
Romania	Bucharest	Embassy		
Russia	Moscow	Embassy		
Serbia	Belgrade	Embassy		
Slovenia	Ljubljana	Embassy		
Spain	Madrid	Embassy	Countries: Andorra; Morocco	
Sweden	Stockholm	Embassy	Countries: Denmark; Iceland; Norway	
Switzerland	Bern	Embassy	Countries: Liechtenstein	
Ukraine	Kyiv	Embassy		
Ukraine	Uzhhorod	Consulate-General		
United Kingdom	London	Embassy		

=== Oceania ===
Host country	Host city	Mission	Concurrent accreditation	Ref.
Australia	Canberra	Embassy	Countries: Fiji; Marshall Islands; Micronesia; Nauru; New Zealand; Papua New Guinea; Samoa; Solomon Islands; Tuvalu	
Australia	Sydney	Consulate-General	Countries: Fiji; Marshall Islands; Micronesia; Nauru; New Zealand; Papua New Guinea; Samoa; Solomon Islands; Tuvalu	

=== Multilateral Organizations ===
Organization	Host city	Host country	Mission	Concurrent accreditation	Ref.
Council of Europe	Strasbourg	France	Permanent Mission		
European Union	Brussels	Belgium	Permanent Representation		
NATO	Brussels	Belgium	Permanent Delegation		
OECD	Paris	France	Permanent Mission		
UNESCO	Paris	France	Permanent Delegation		
United Nations	New York City	United States	Permanent Mission		
United Nations	Geneva	Switzerland	Permanent Mission	International Organizations: Conference on Disarmament; World Health Organization	
United Nations	Vienna	Austria	Permanent Mission	International Organizations: OSCE; International Atomic Energy Agency; UNIDO; UNODC	

== Gallery ==
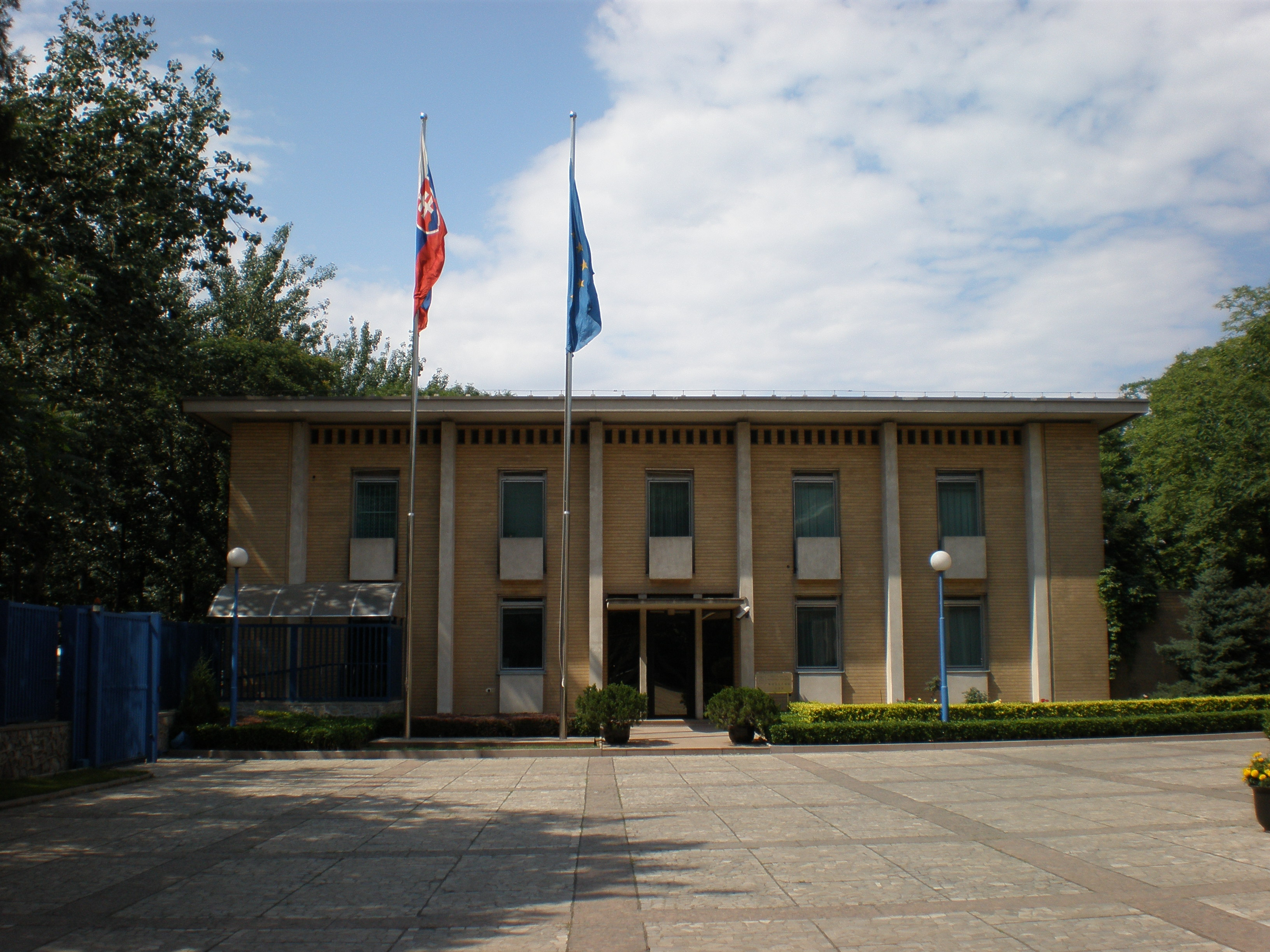
Embassy in Beijing

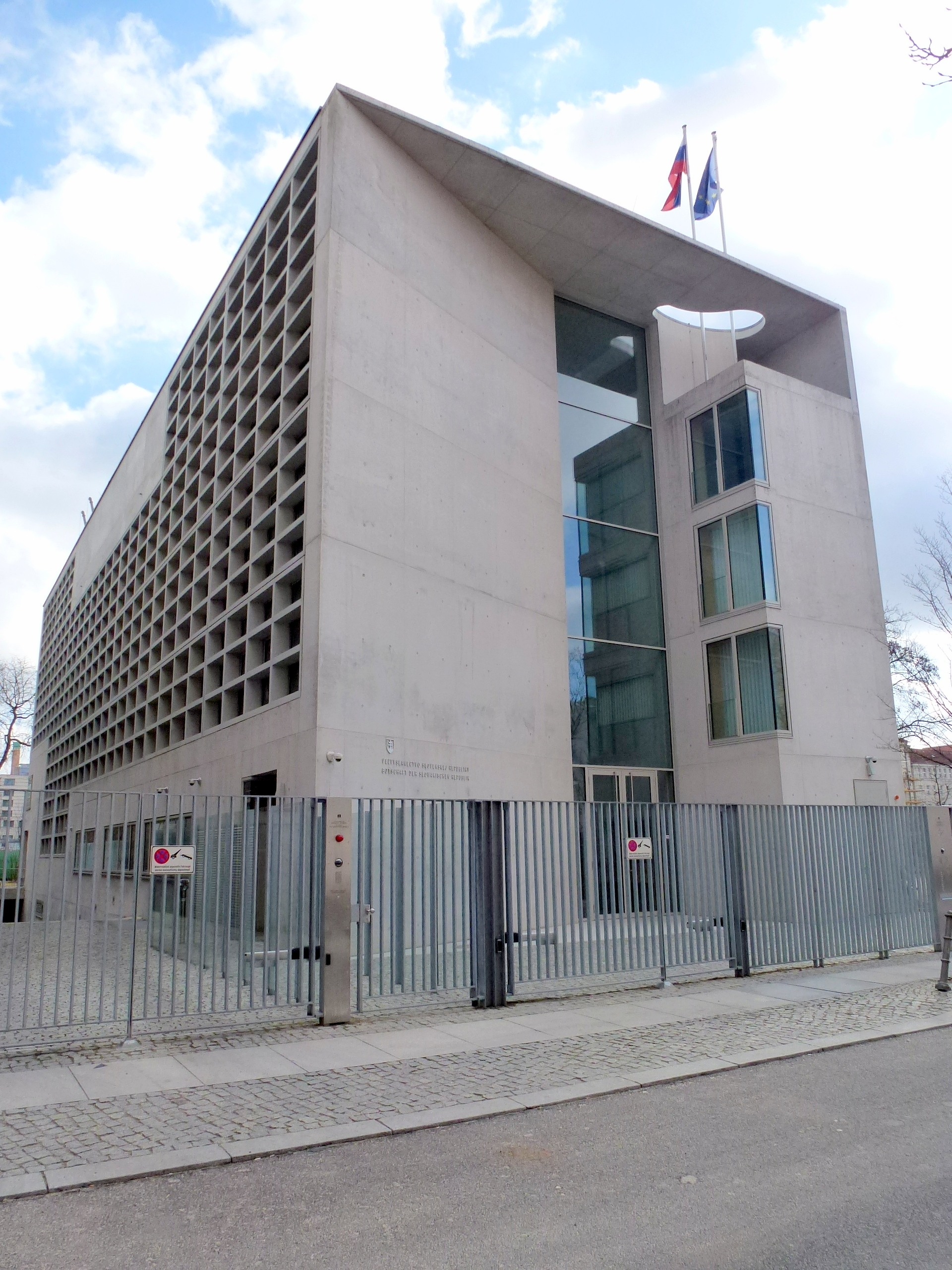
Embassy in Berlin

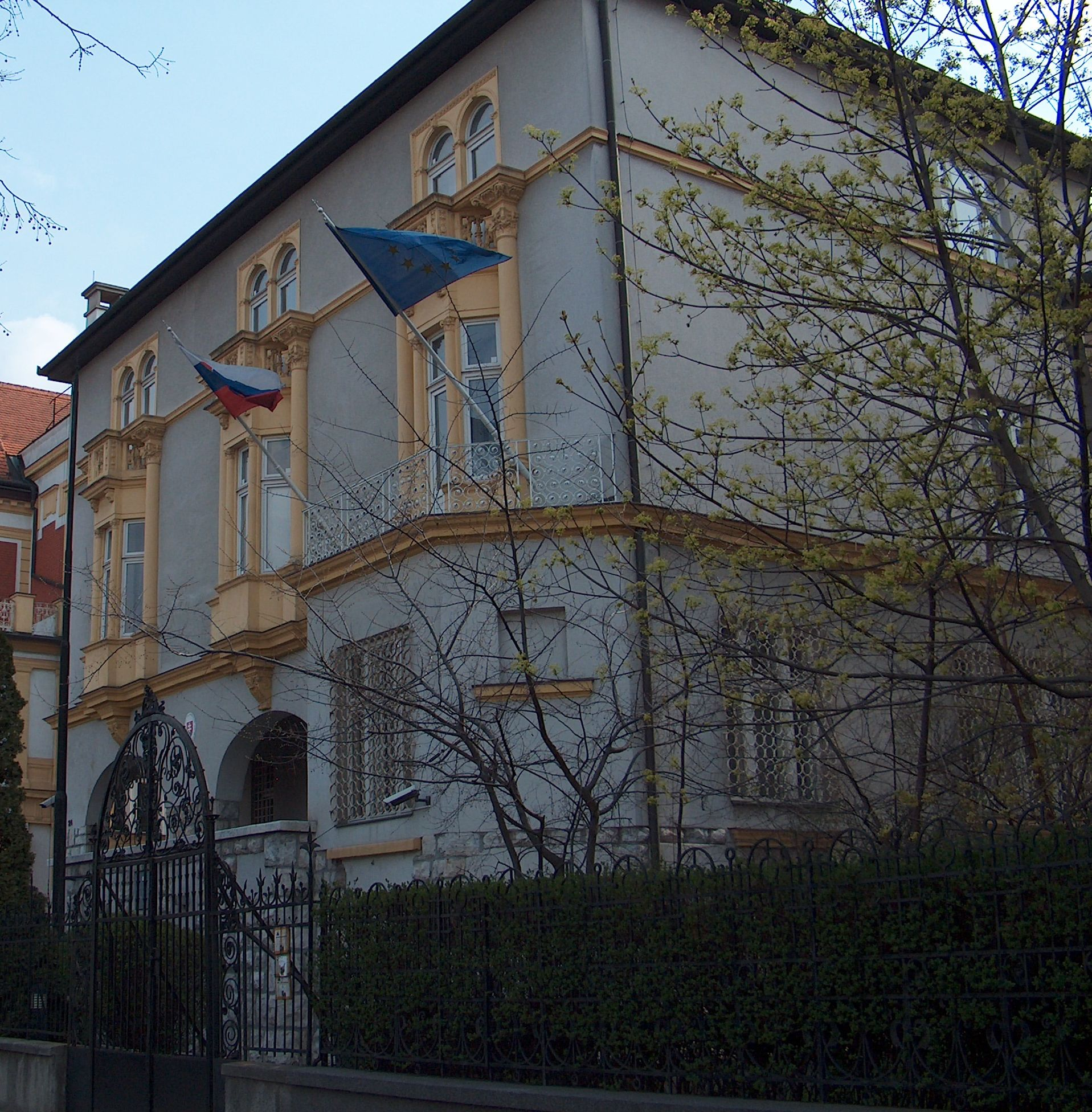
Embassy in Budapest

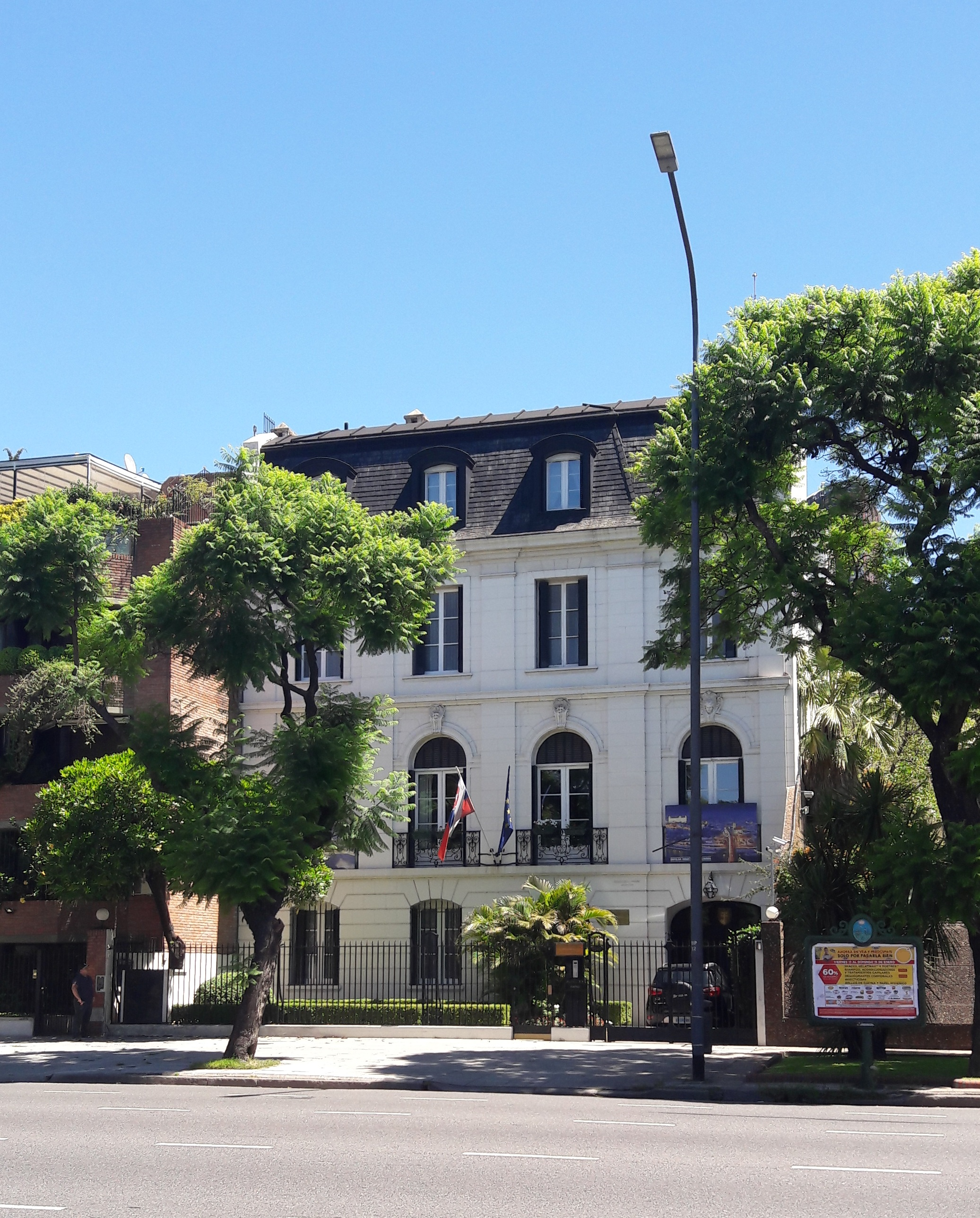
Embassy in Buenos Aires

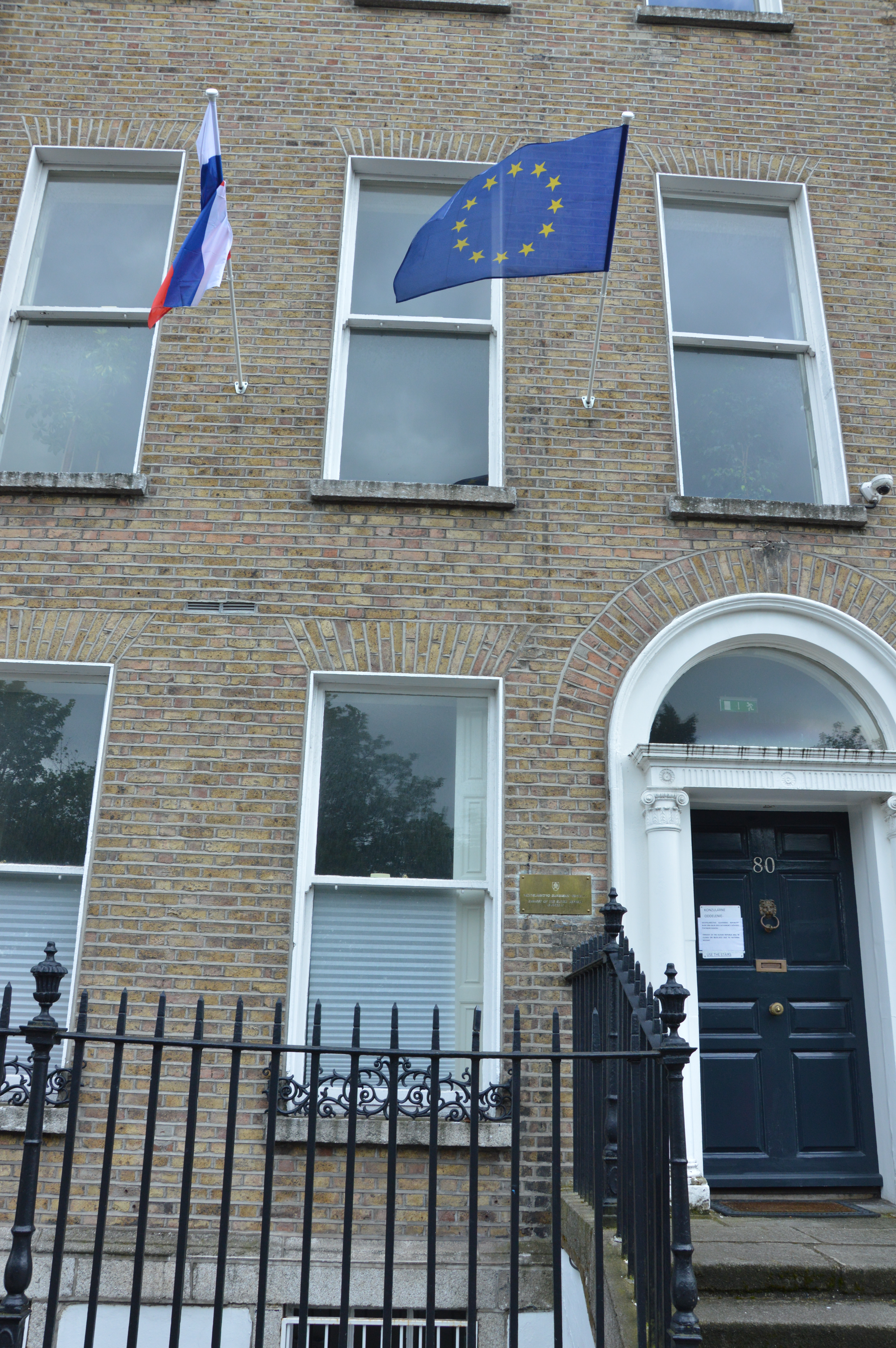
Embassy in Dublin

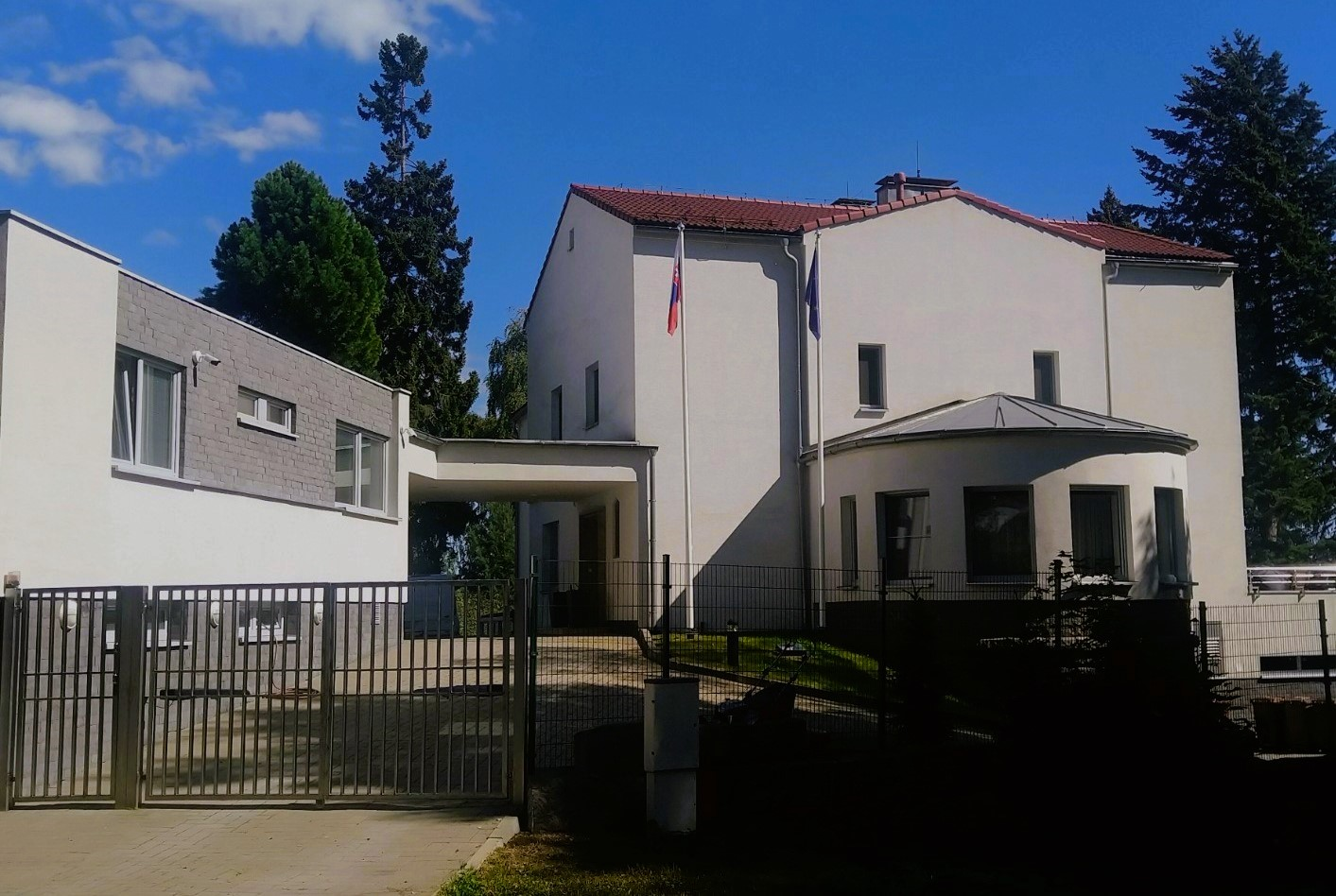
Embassy in Helsinki

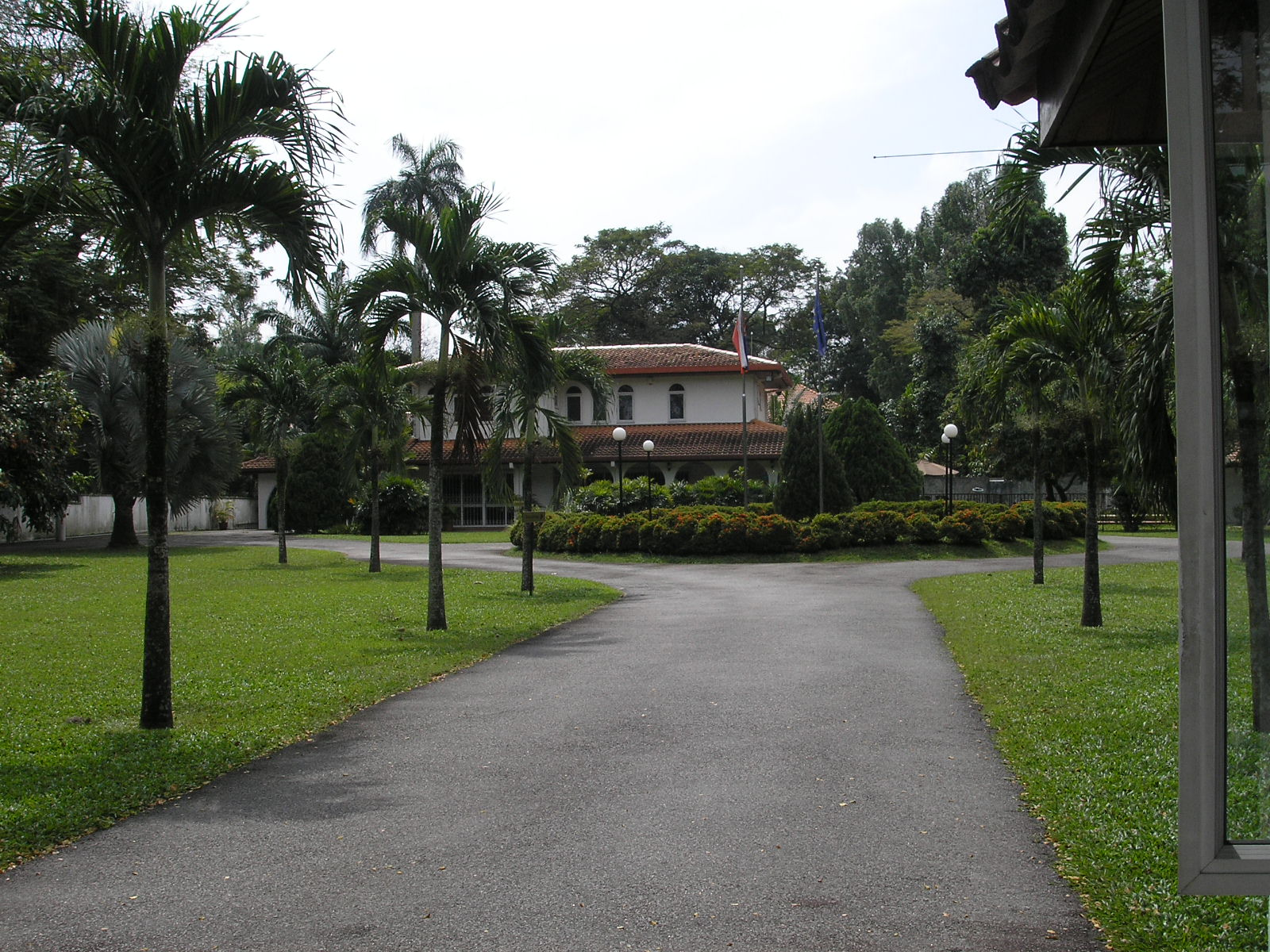
Embassy in Kuala Lumpur

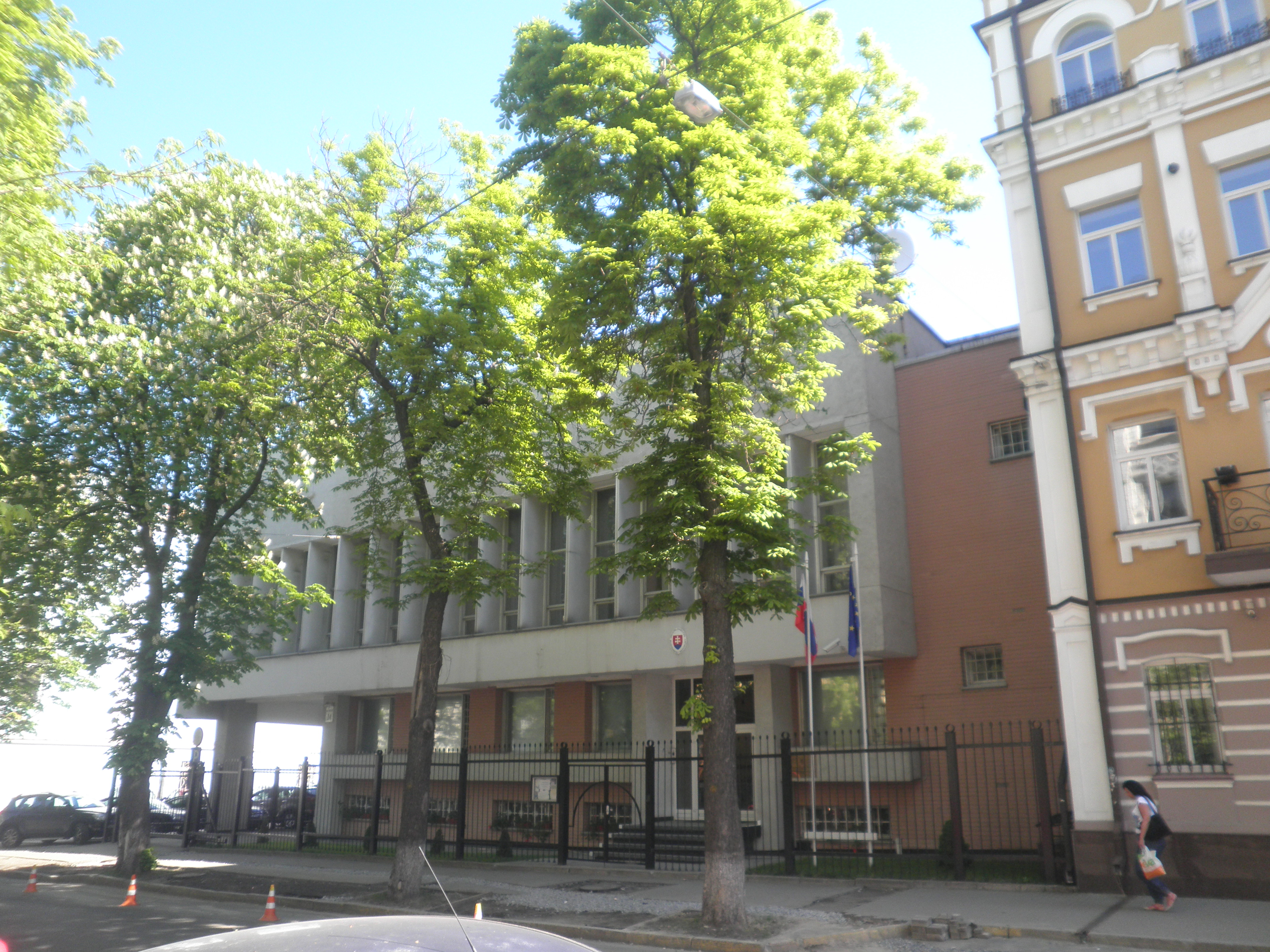
Embassy in Kyiv

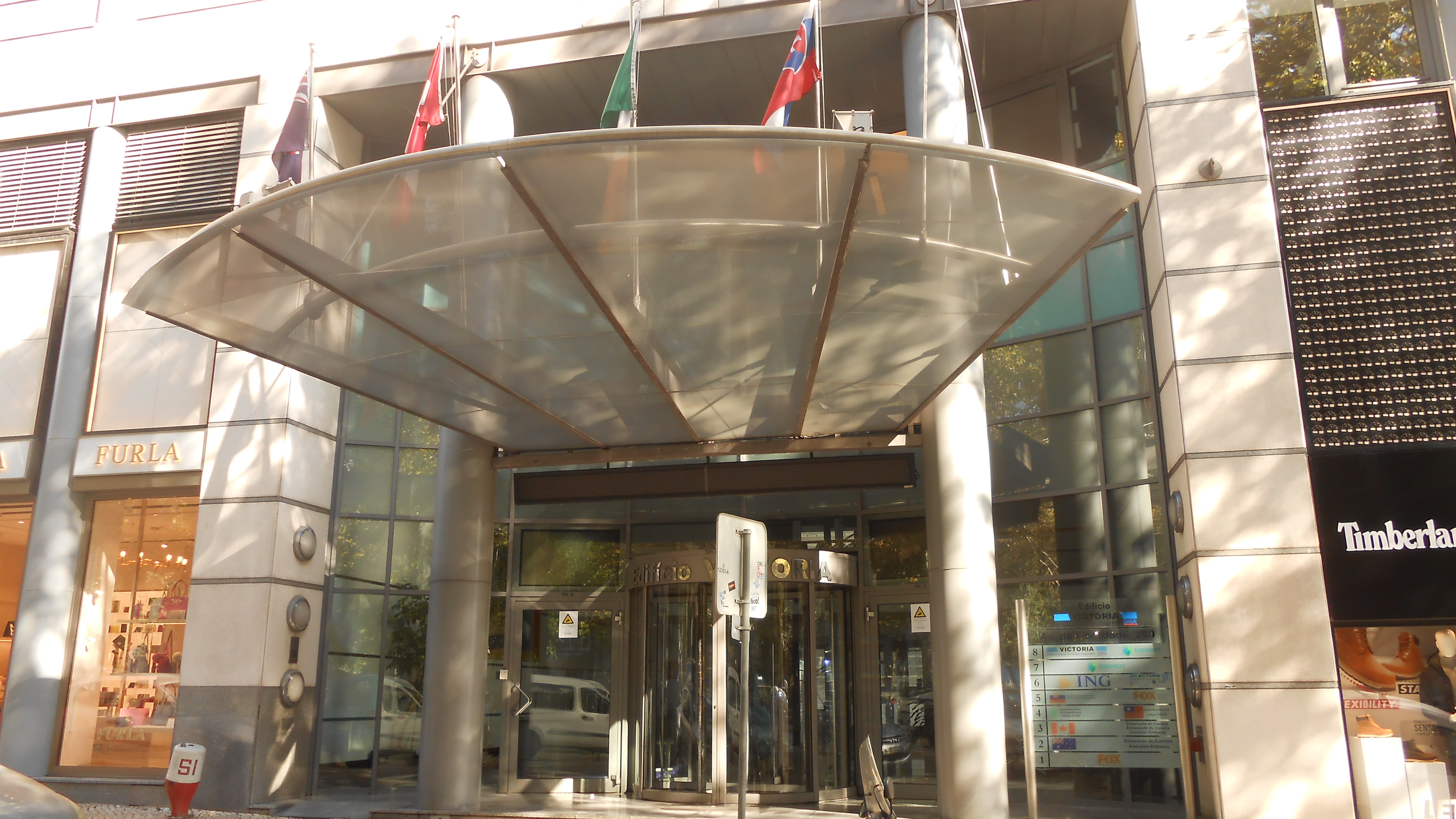
Building hosting the Embassy in Lisbon

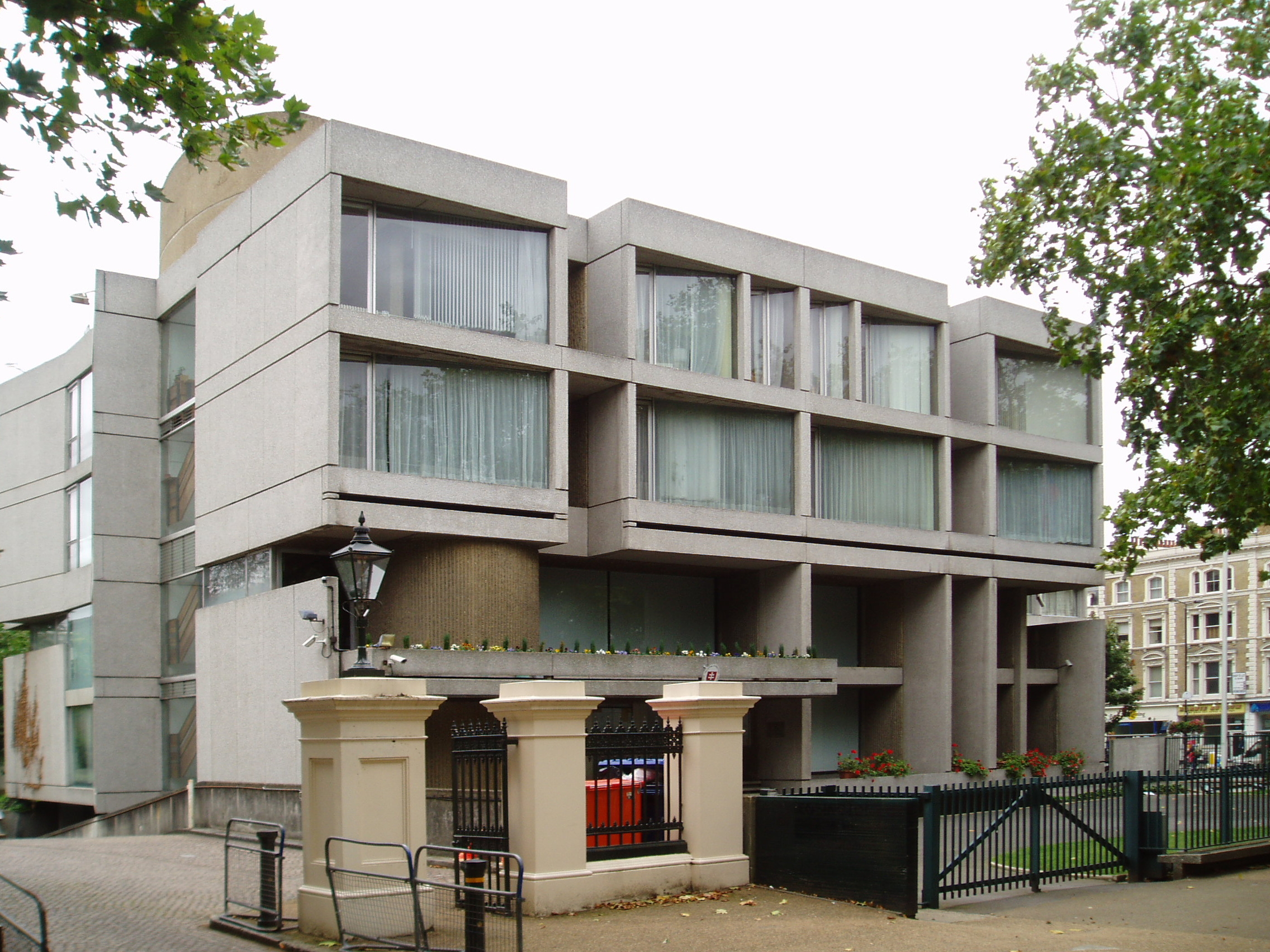
Embassy in London

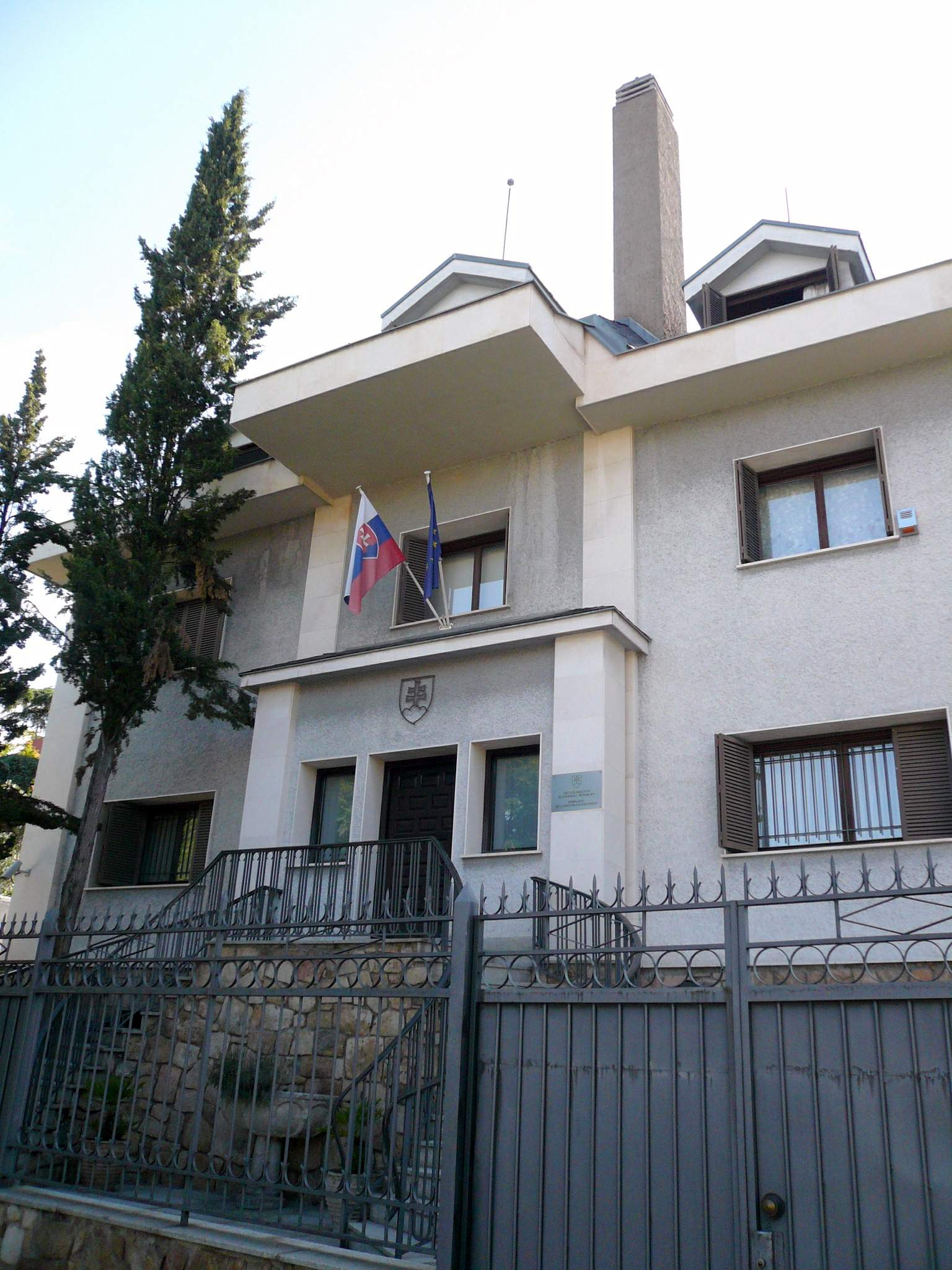
Embassy in Madrid

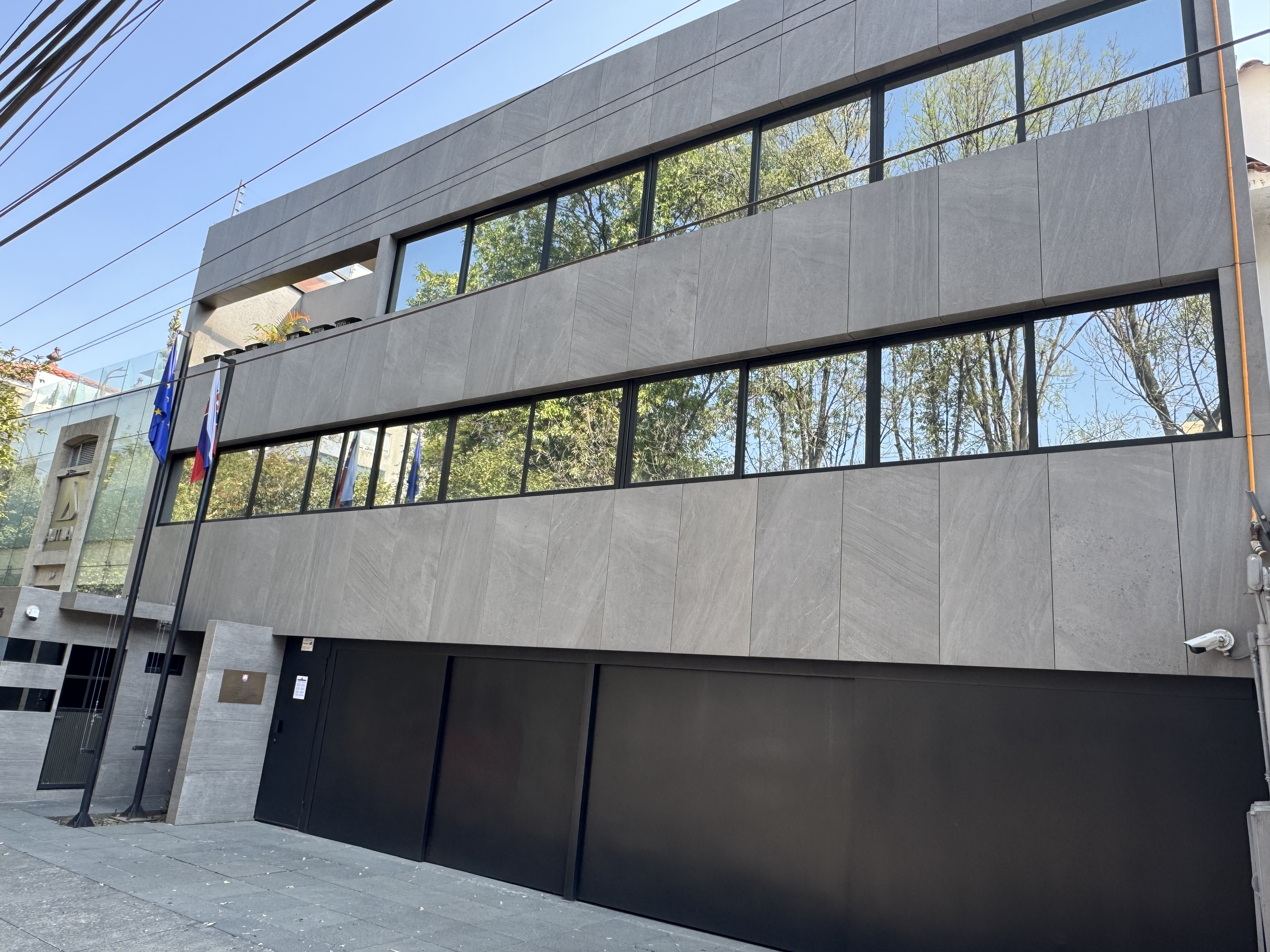
Embassy in Mexico City

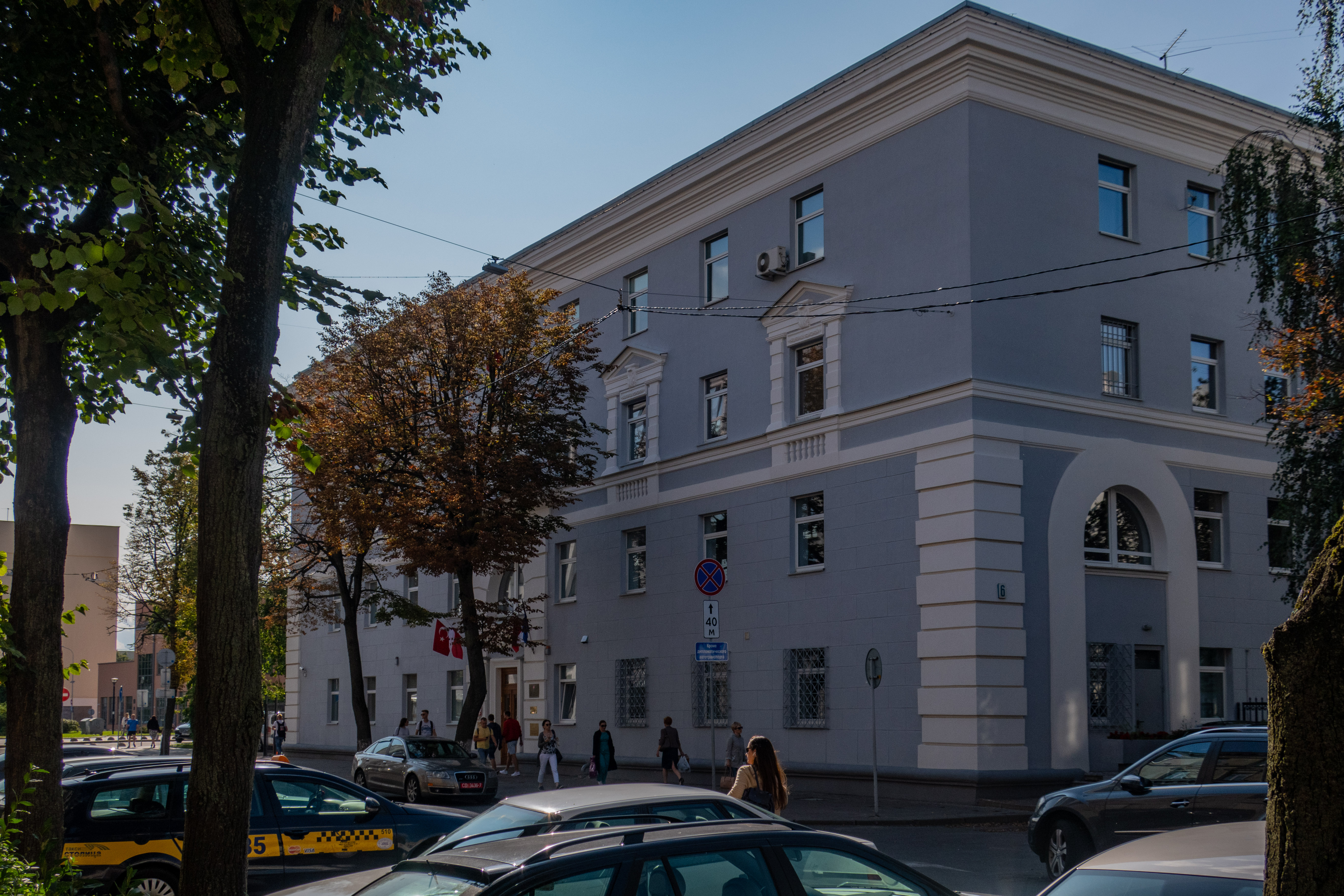
Embassy in Minsk

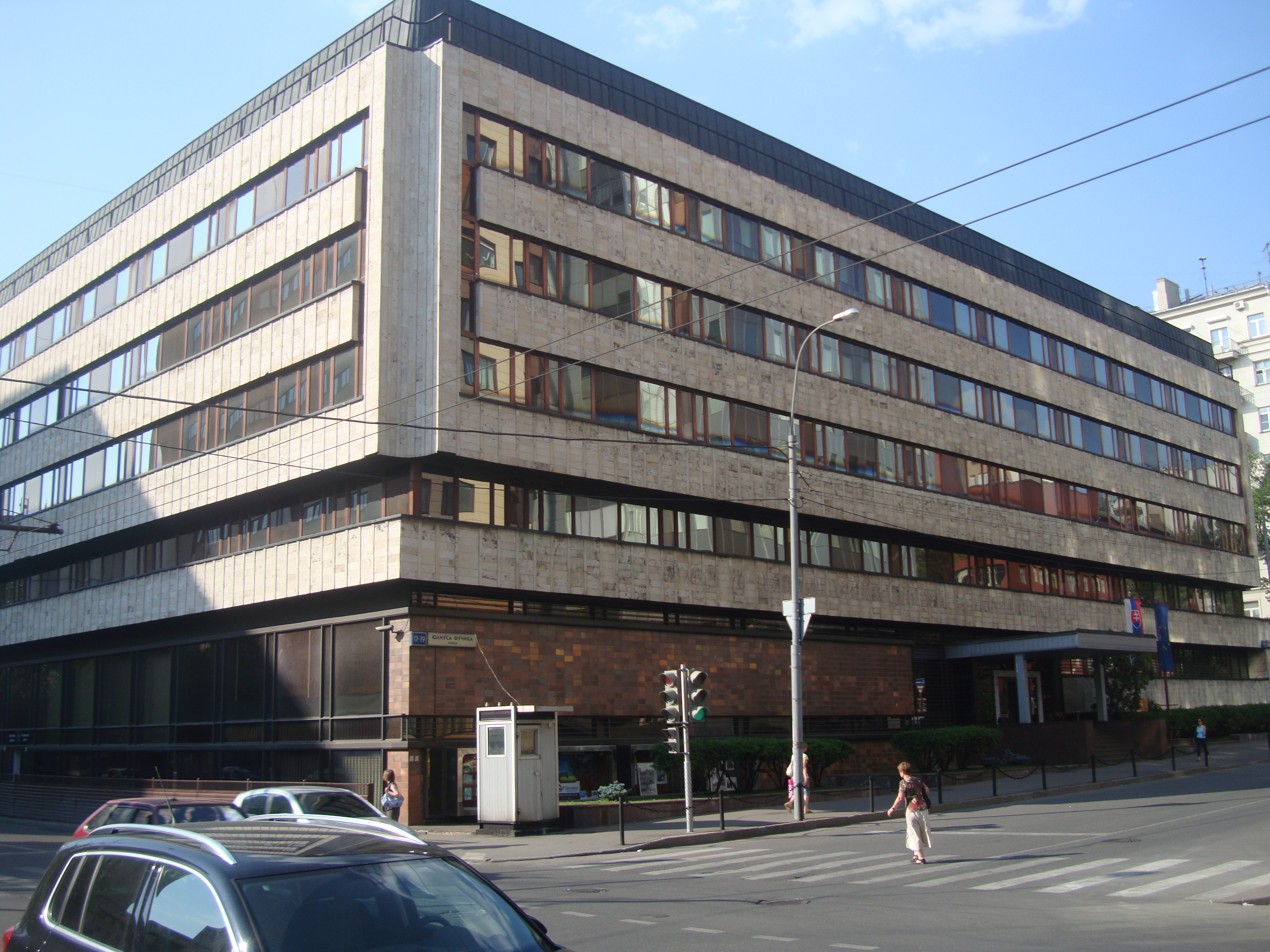
Embassy in Moscow

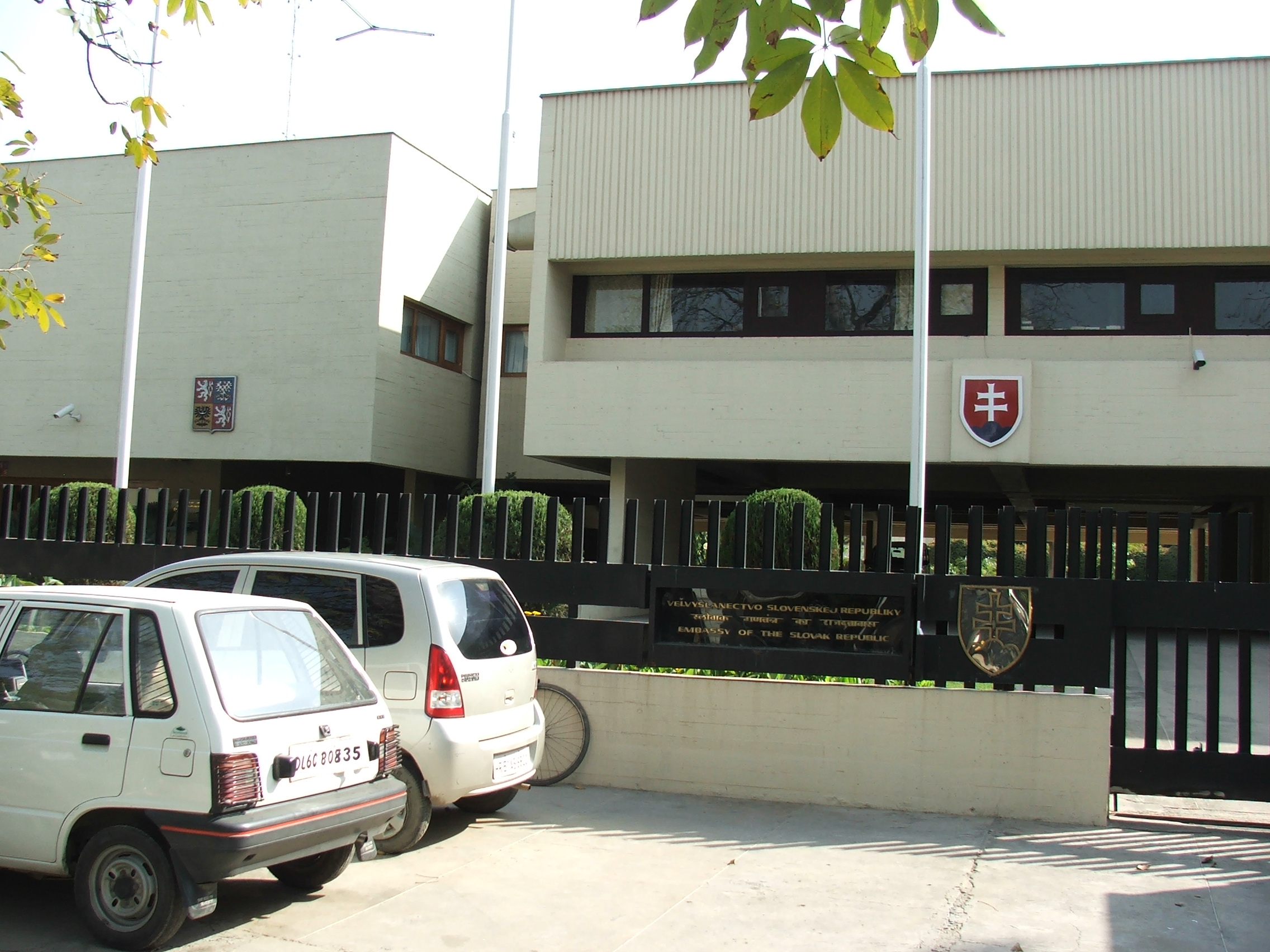
Embassy in New Delhi

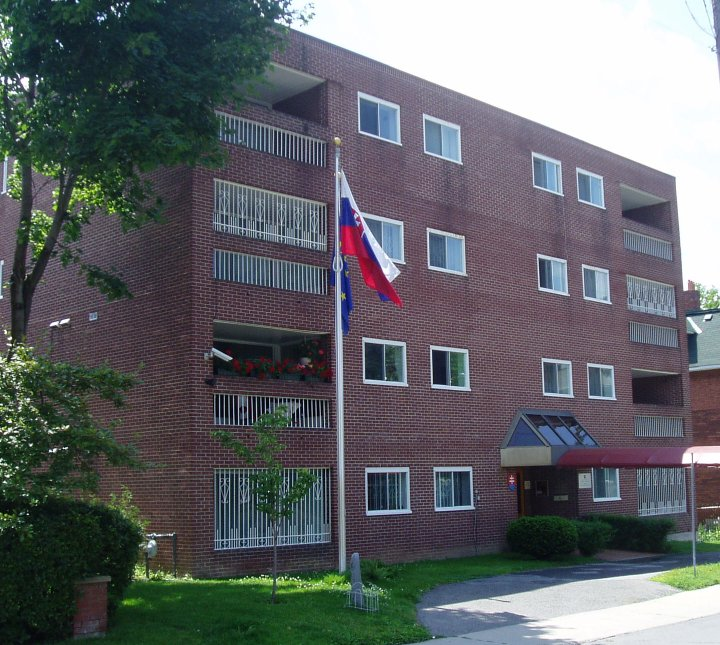
Embassy in Ottawa

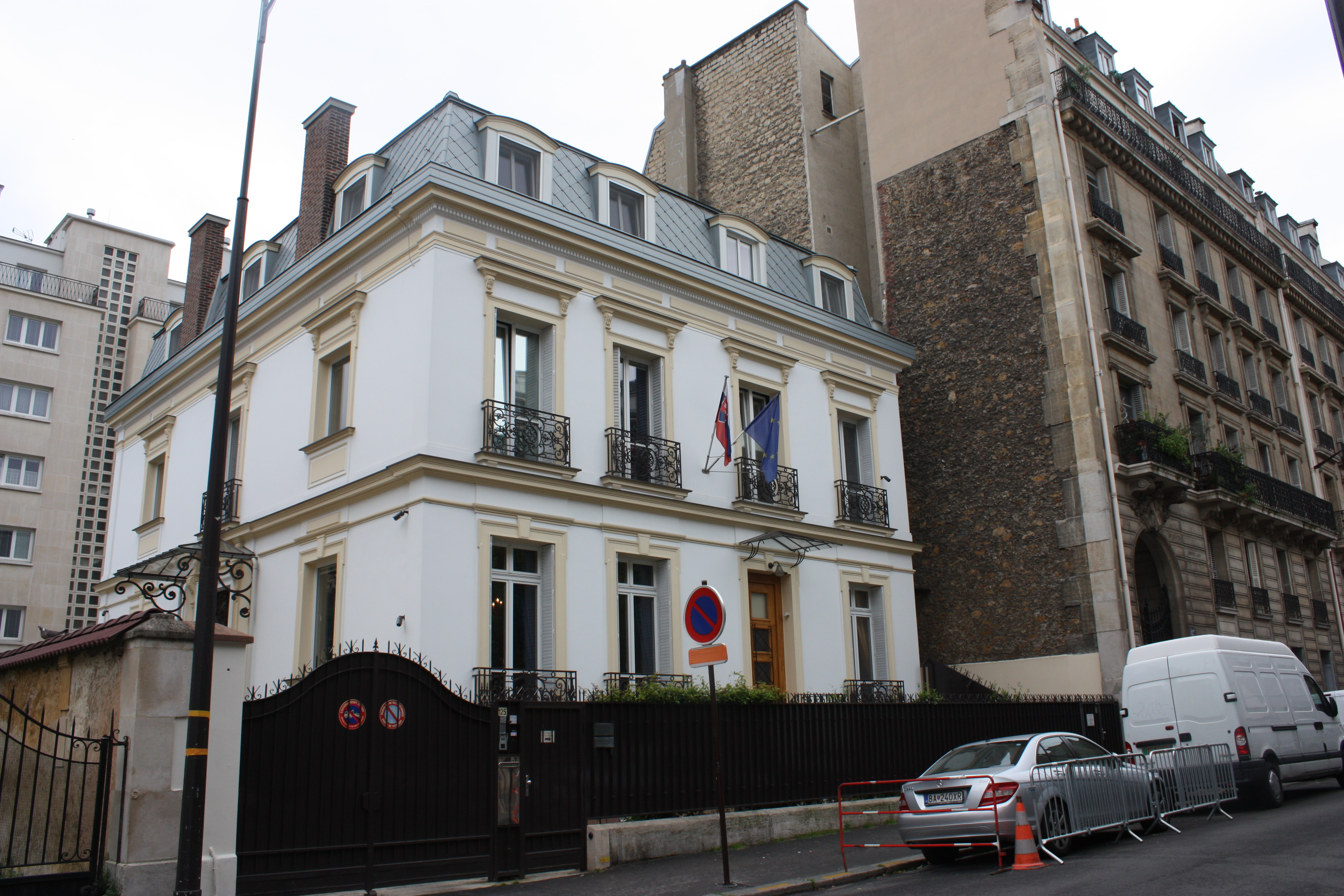
Embassy in Paris

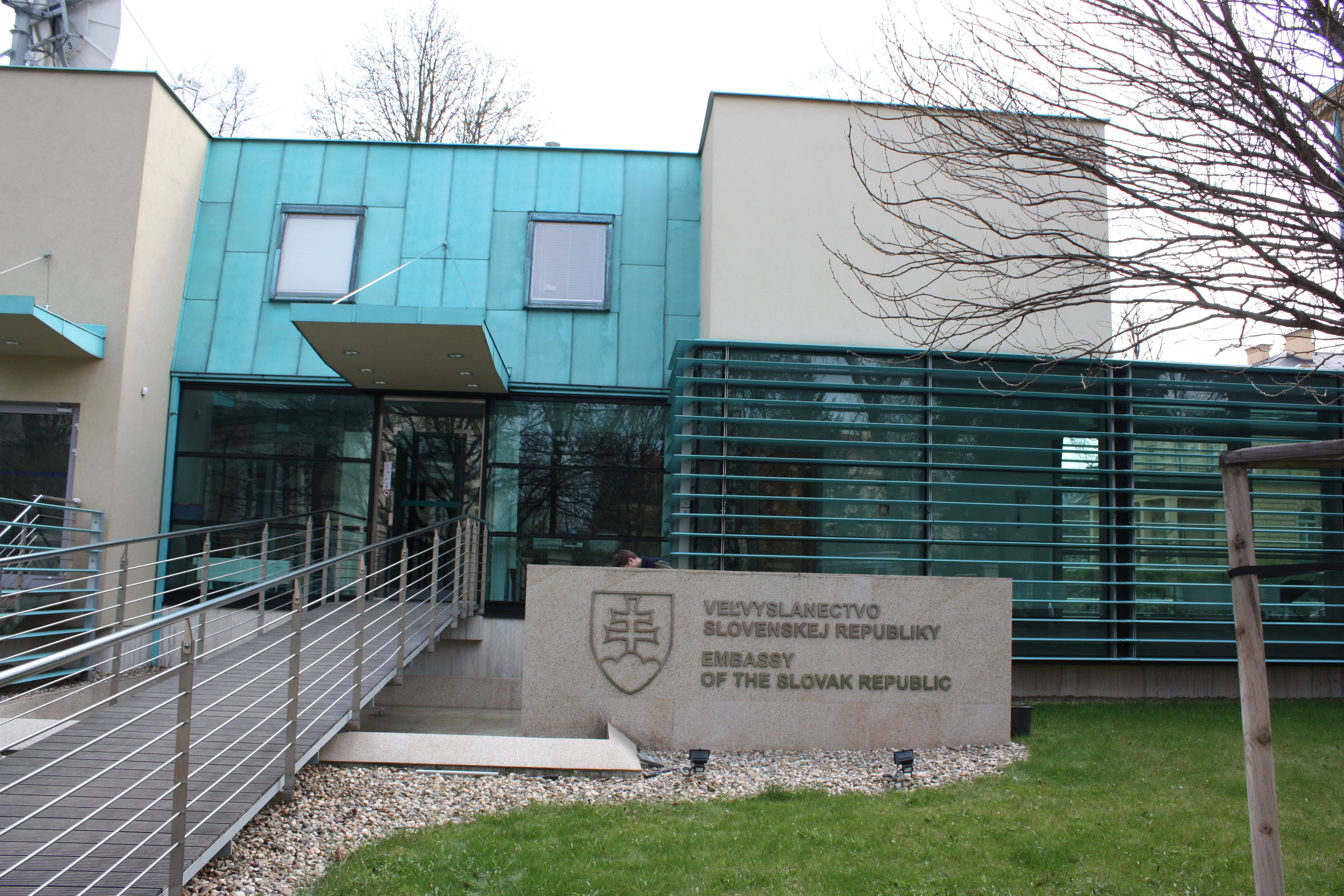
Embassy in Prague

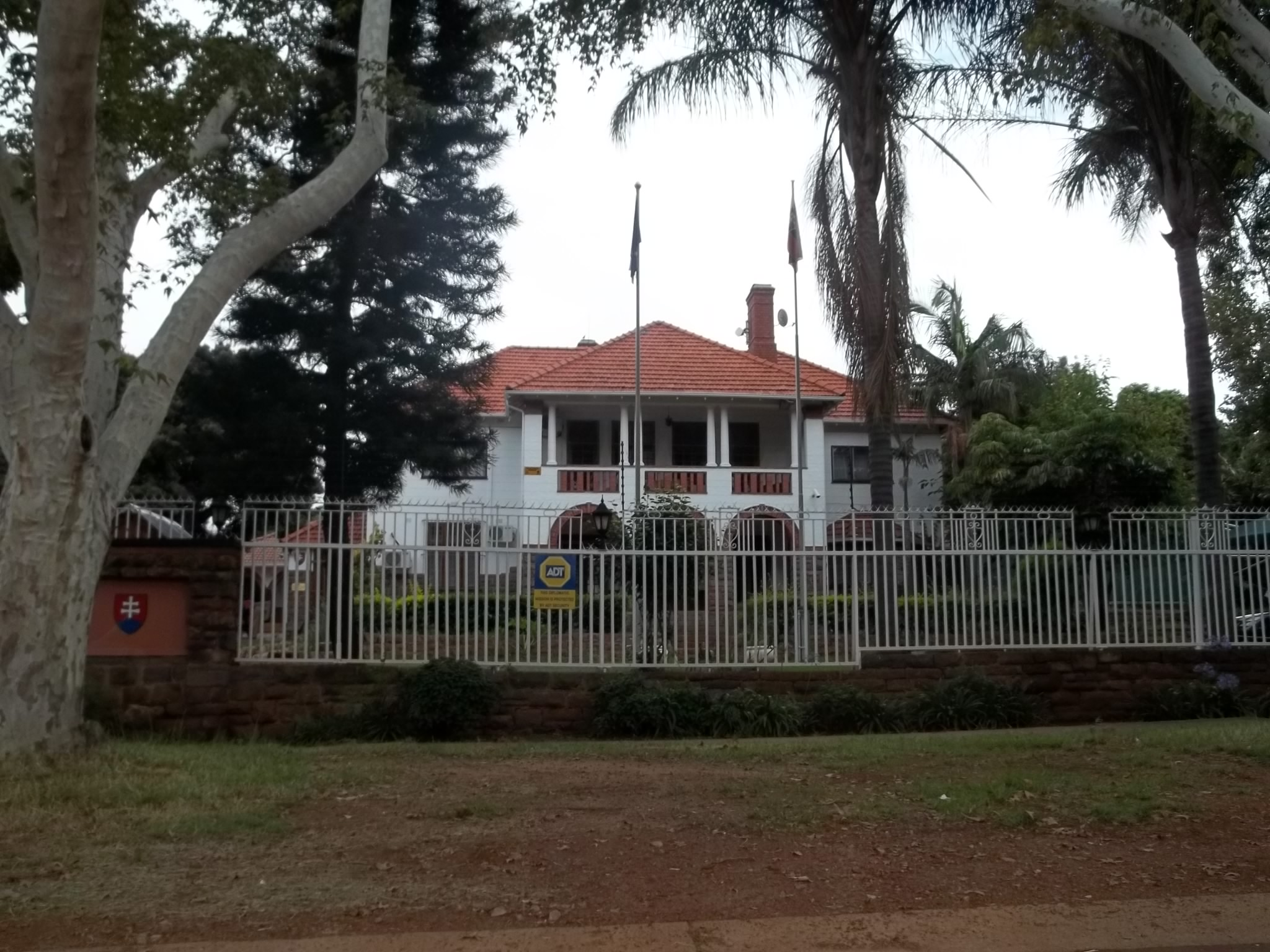
Embassy in Pretoria

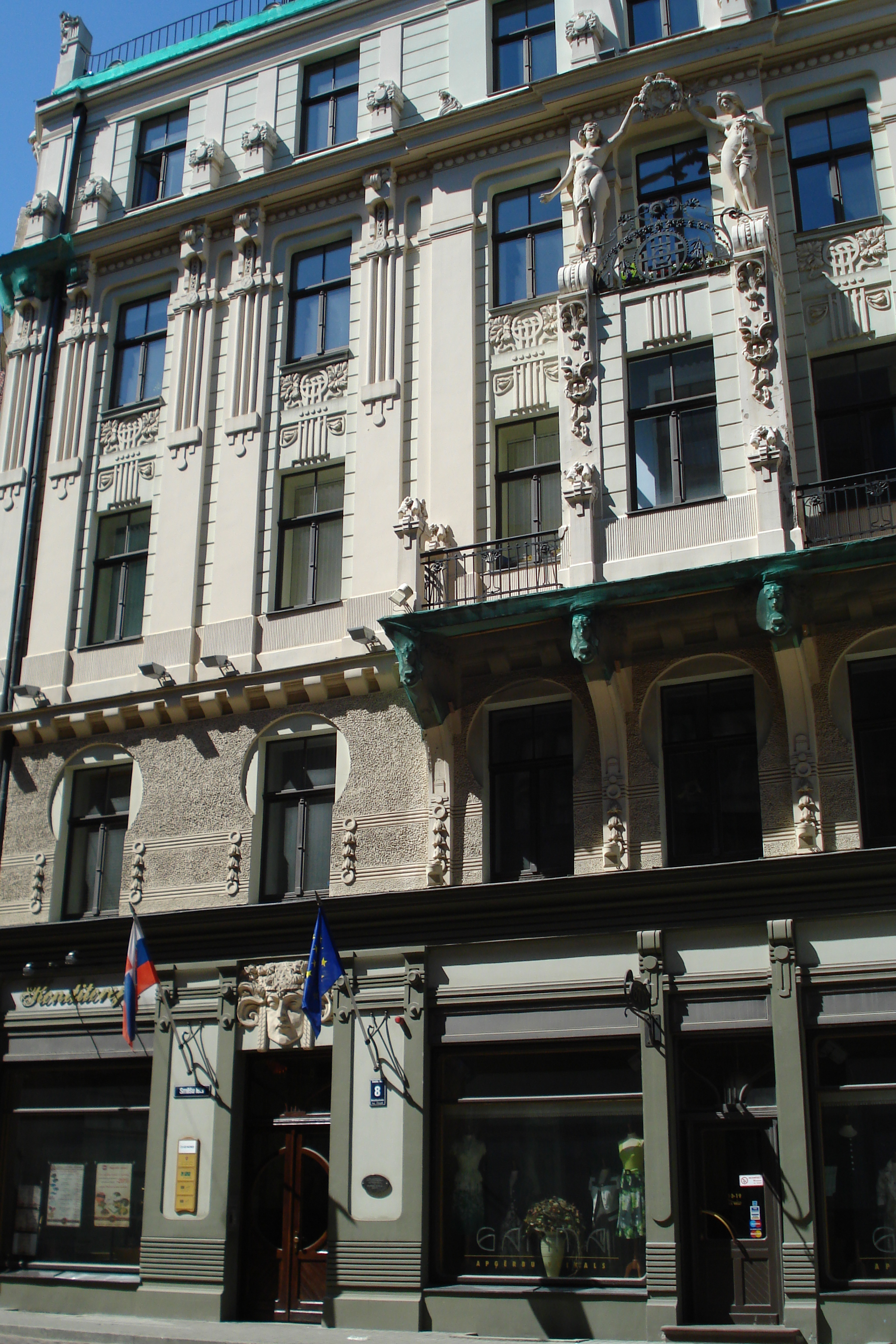
Embassy in Riga

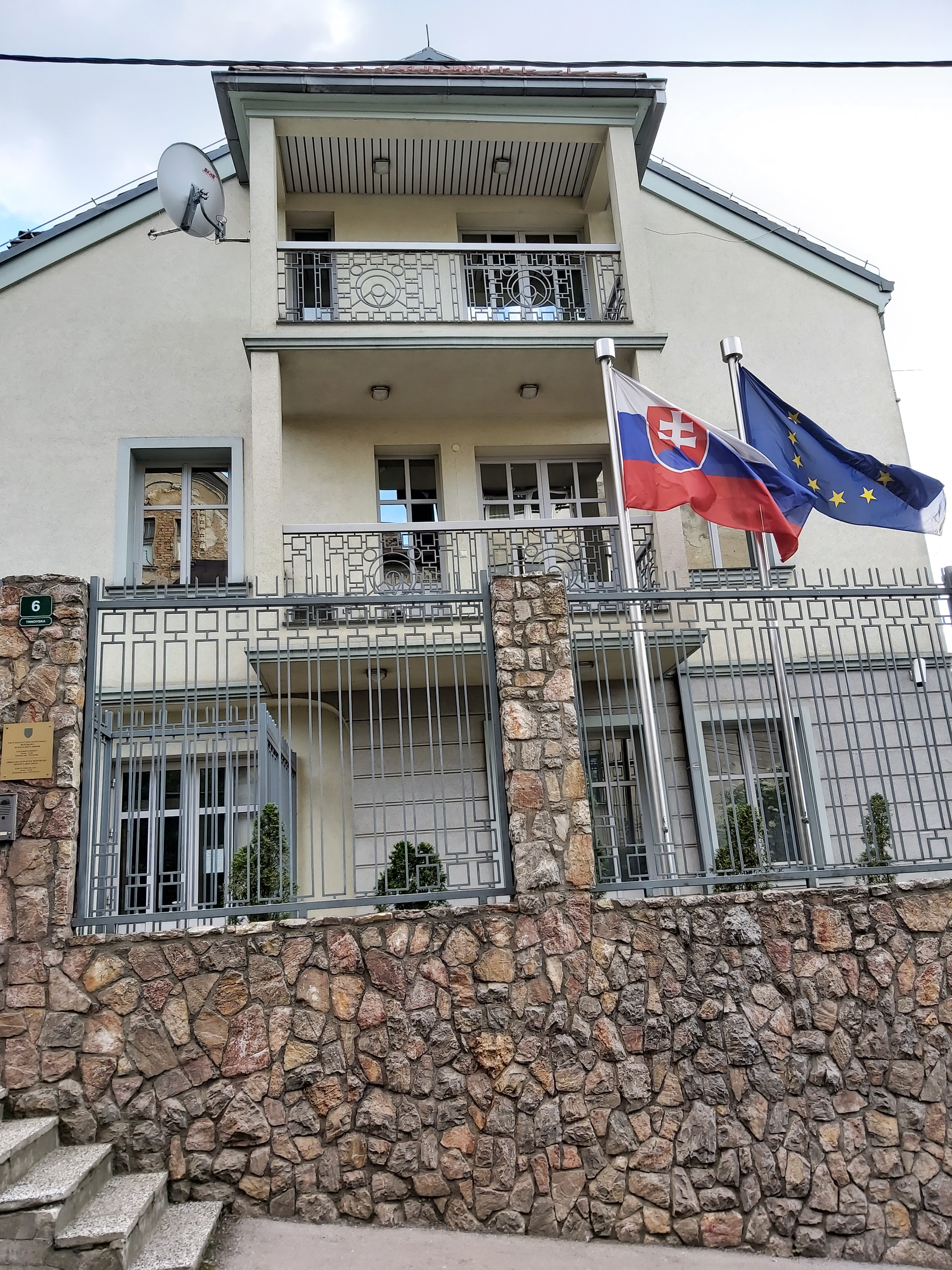
Embassy in Sarajevo

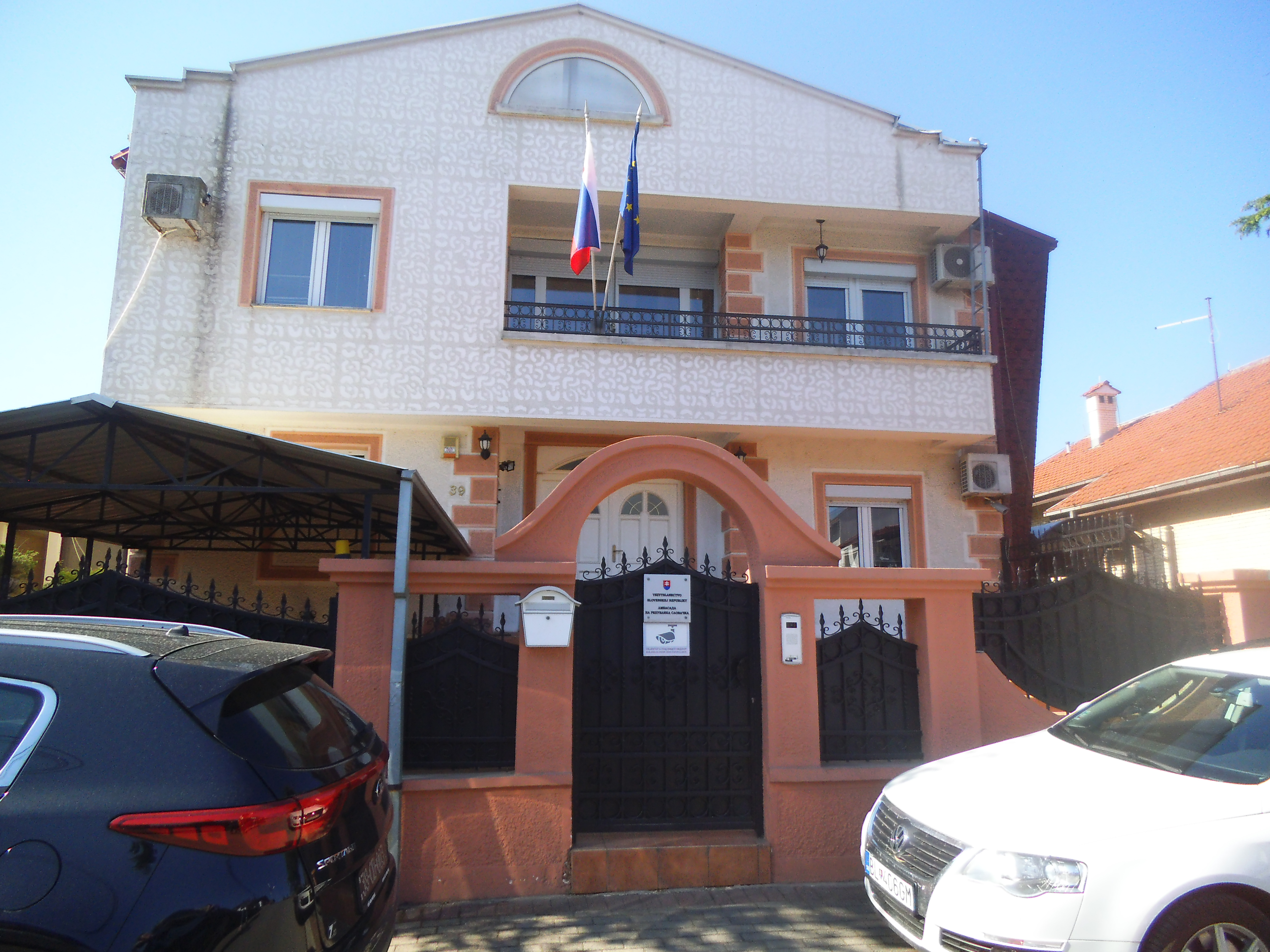
Embassy in Skopje

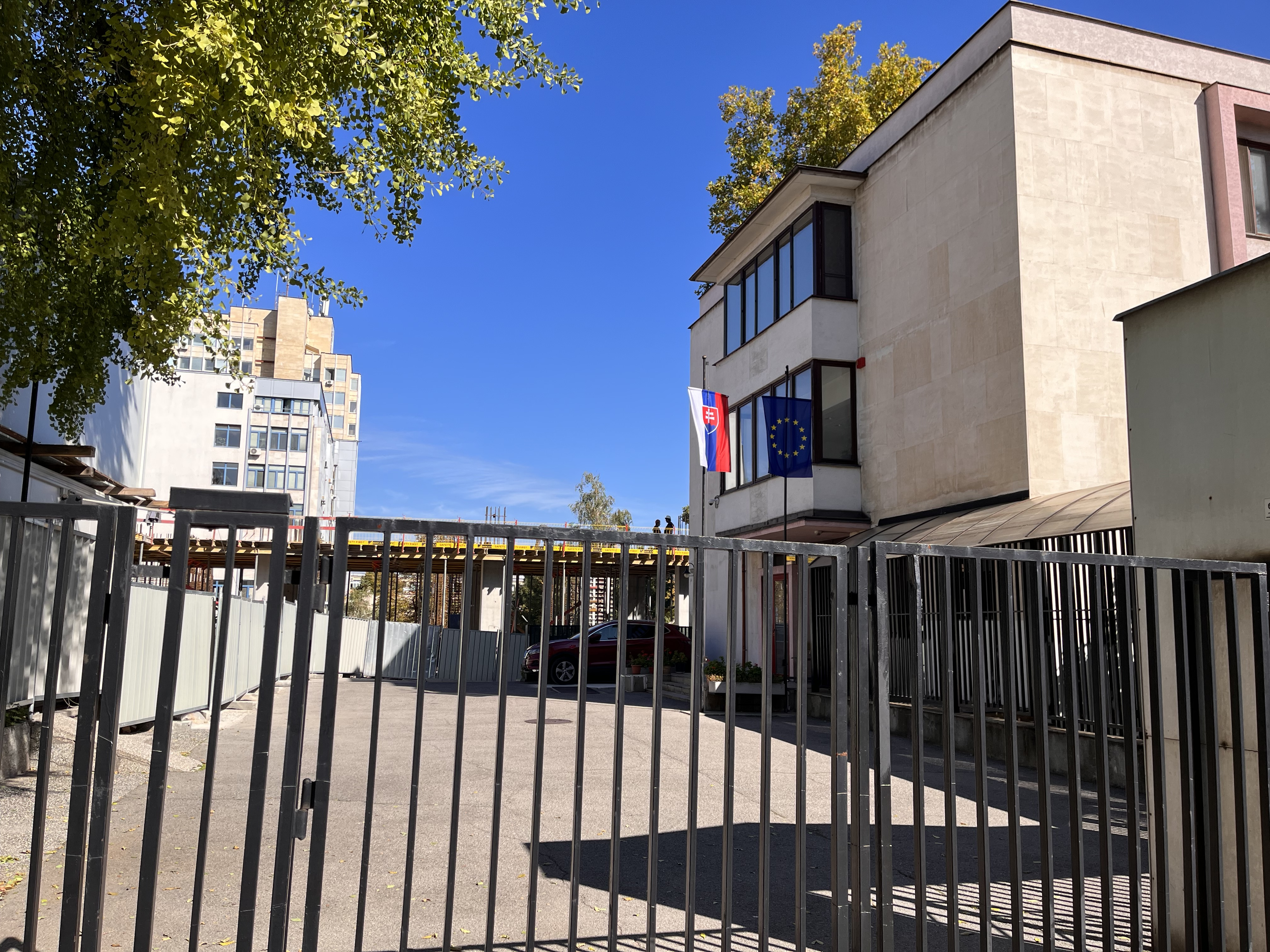
Embassy in Sofia

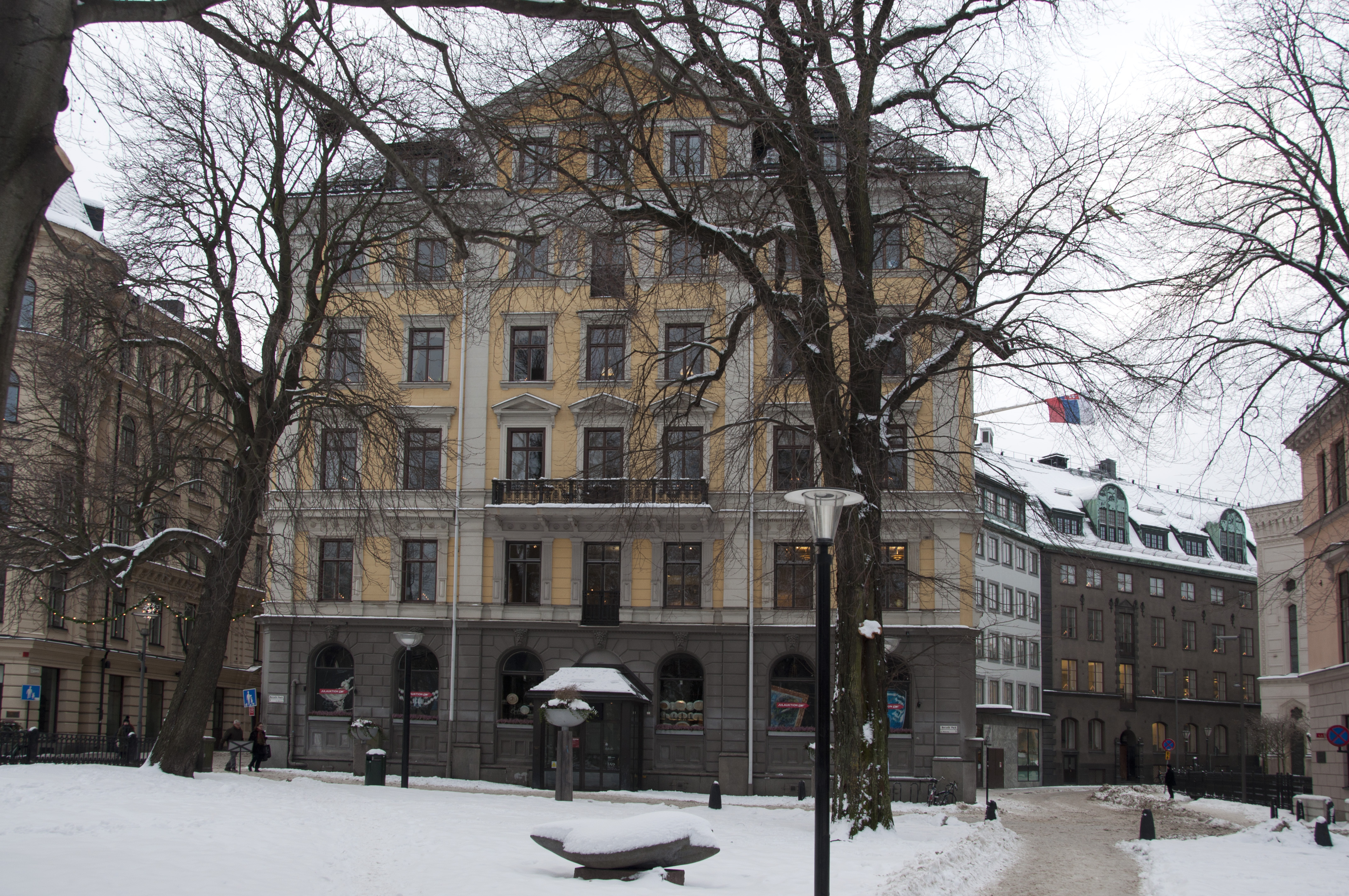
Embassy in Stockholm

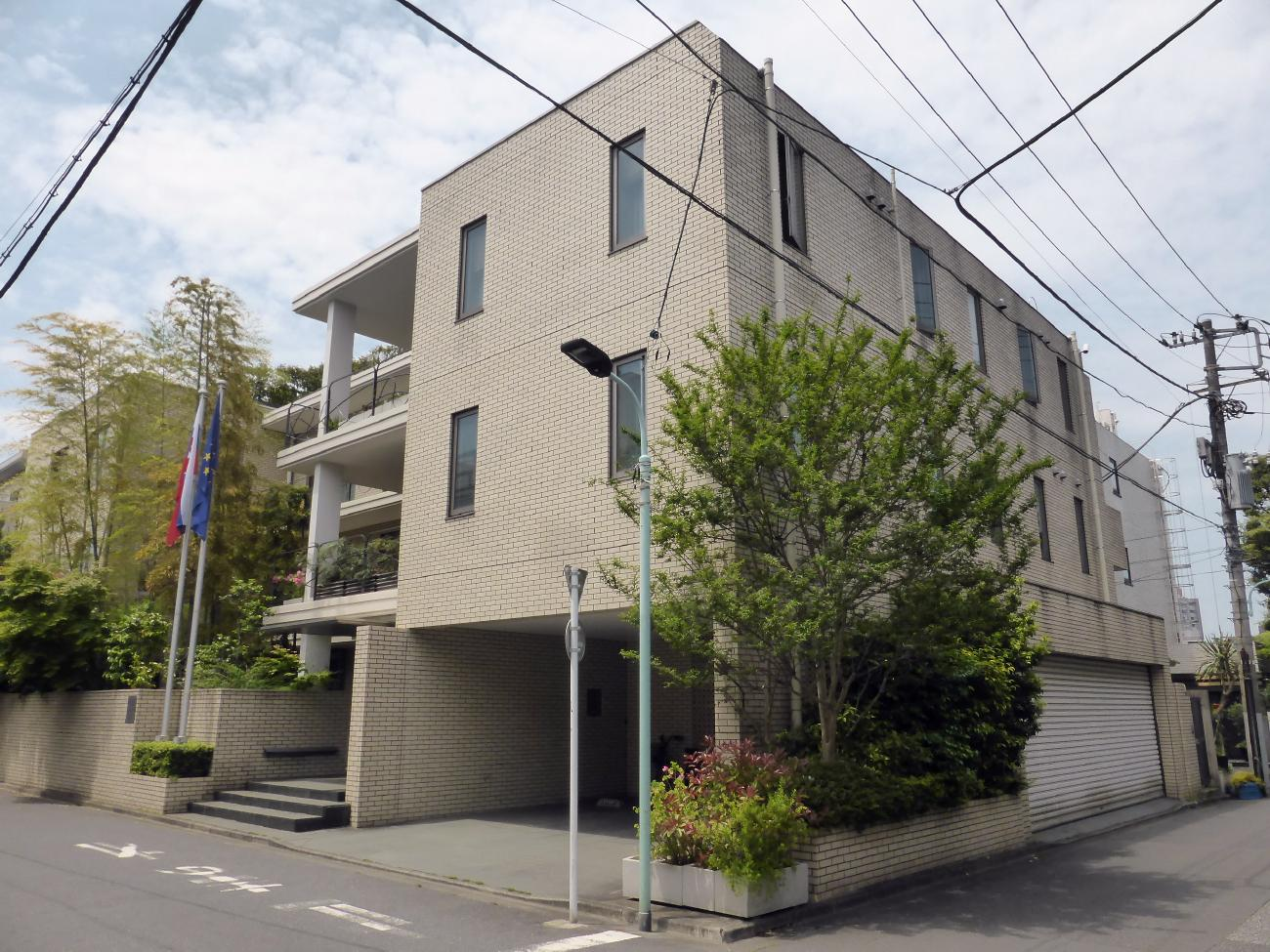
Embassy in Tokyo

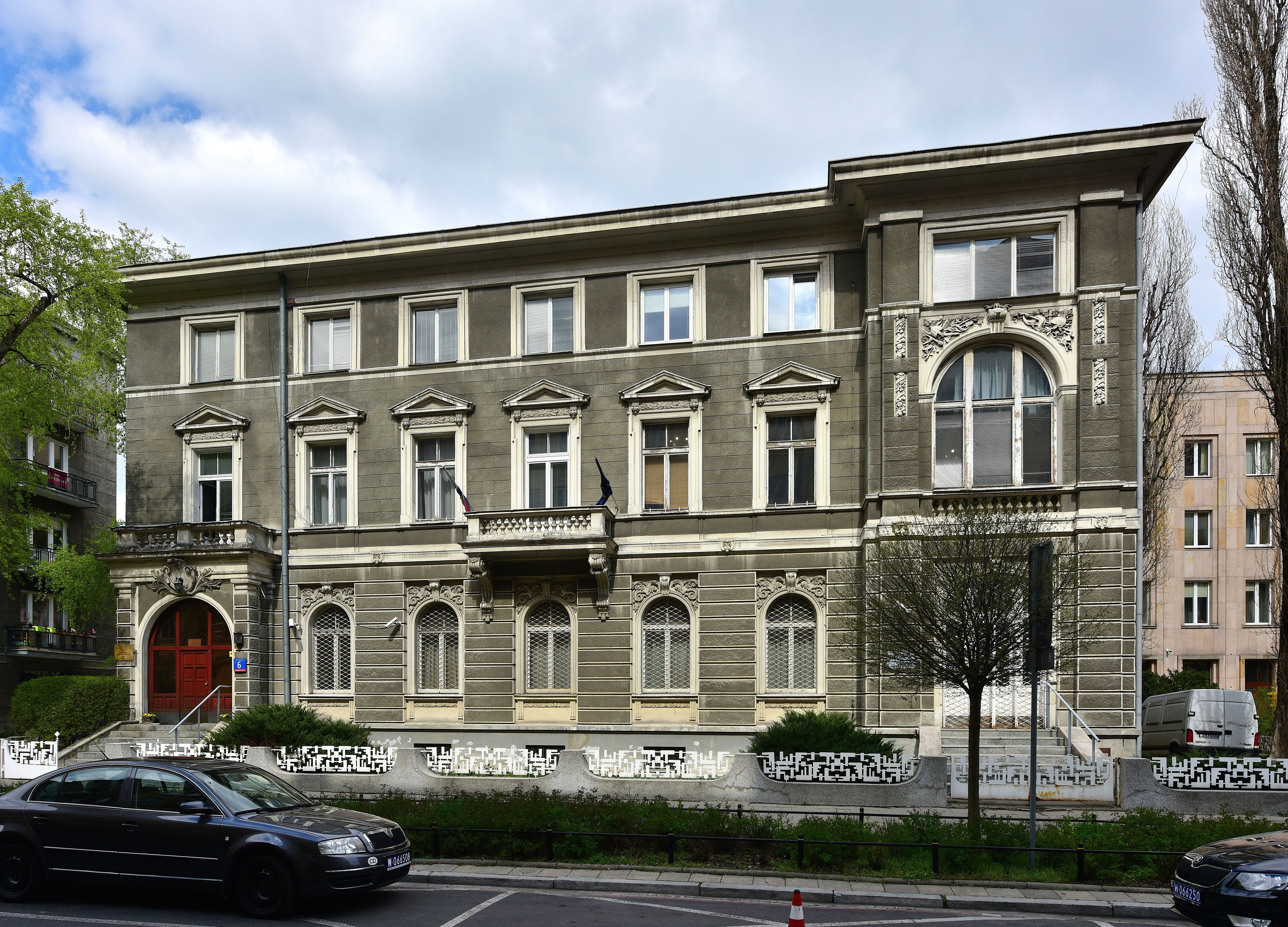
Embassy in Warsaw

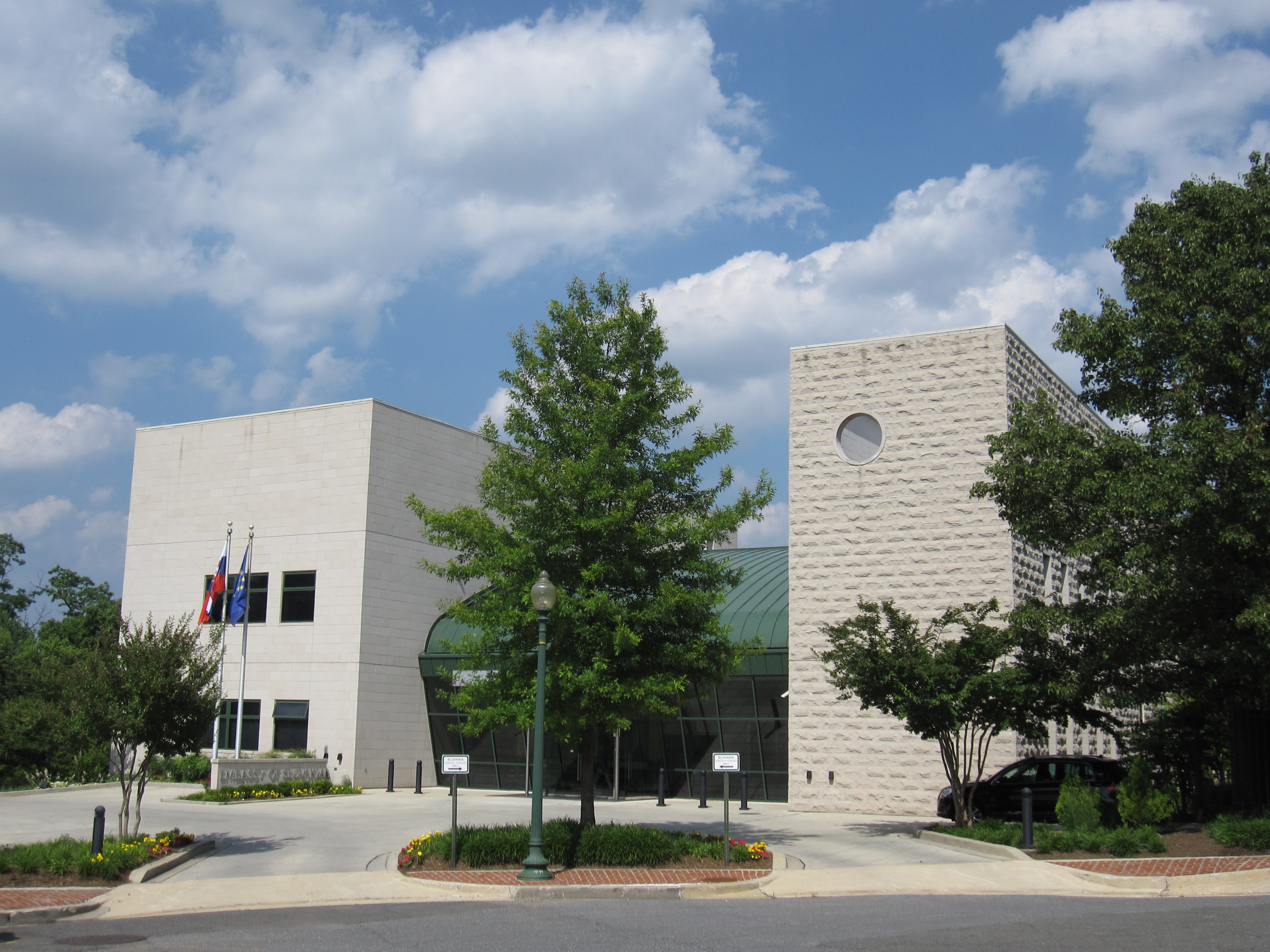
Embassy in Washington, D.C.

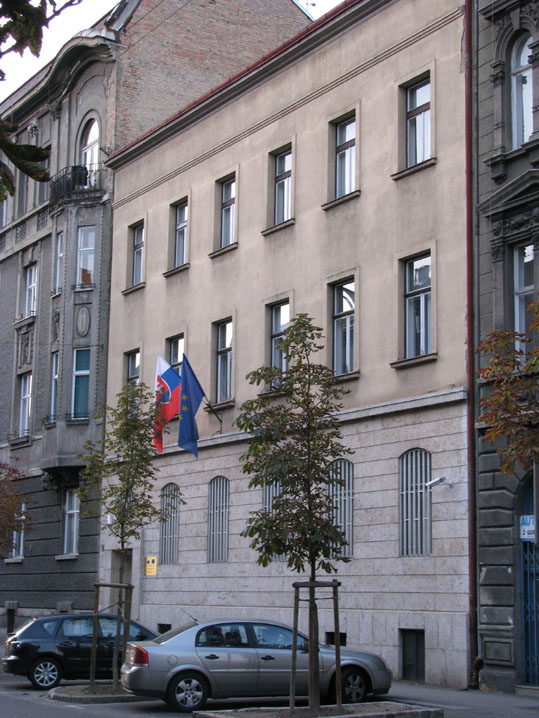
Embassy in Zagreb

== Closed missions ==
=== Africa ===
Host country	Host city	Mission	Year closed	Ref.
Libya	Tripoli	Embassy	2011	
Zimbabwe	Harare	Embassy	2004	

=== Americas ===
Host country	Host city	Mission	Year closed	Ref.
Chile	Santiago de Chile	Embassy	2004	
Peru	Lima	Embassy	2003	
United States	Los Angeles	Consulate-General	2013	

=== Asia ===
Host country	Host city	Mission	Year closed	Ref.
Iraq	Baghdad	Embassy	2014	
Syria	Damascus	Embassy	2012	

=== Europe ===
Host country	Host city	Mission	Year closed	Ref.
Denmark	Copenhagen	Embassy	2024	
Germany	Bonn	Embassy branch office	2010	
Kosovo	Pristina	Liaison office	2024	
Norway	Oslo	Embassy	2024	
Poland	Kraków	Consulate-General	2024	
Russia	Saint Petersburg	Consulate-General	2024	

== See also ==
- Foreign relations of Slovakia
- List of diplomatic missions in Slovakia
- Ministry of Foreign Affairs (Slovakia)
