= Mikola =

Mikola is the name of:

Surname

- Ananda Mikola (born 1980), Indonesian racecar driver
- István Mikola (born 1947), Hungarian physician and politician, Minister of Health from 2001 to 2002
- Nándor Mikola (1911–2006), Finnish-Hungarian painter

Given name

- Saint Nicholas of Mozhaysk or Mikola Mozhaiski, a Russian variation of the Saint Nikolaus traditions
- Mikola Abramchyk (1903–1970), Belarusian journalist and politician
- Mikola Statkevich (born 1956), Belarusian politician
- Mikola Yermalovich (1921–2000), Belarusian writer and historian

== See also ==
- Saint Nicholas Day (known as Mikołajki in Polish)
