= Viliam Roth =

Slovak journalist and politician (1941–2023)

Minister Without Portfolio
- In office 3 December 1989 – 10 December 1989

Personal details
- Born: 2 October 1941 Poprad, Slovak Republic
- Died: 20 March 2023 (aged 81)
- Party: Independent
- Occupation: Journalist

Viliam Roth (2 October 1941 – 20 March 2023) was a Slovak journalist and politician. An independent, he served as a Minister Without Portfolio from 3 to 10 December 1989.

Roth died on 20 March 2023, at the age of 81.
