= Miroslav Belanský =

Slovak agronomist (1941–2023)

Minister of Agriculture and Subsistence
- In office 12 December 1989 – 26 June 1990
- Prime Minister: Milan Čič
- Preceded by: Position established
- Succeeded by: Michal Džatko

Personal details
- Born: 2 July 1941 Hlohovec, Slovak Republic
- Died: 27 May 2023 (aged 81) Cífer, Slovakia
- Education: Slovak University of Agriculture
- Occupation: Agronomist

Miroslav Belanský (2 July 1941 – 27 May 2023) was a Slovak agronomist who served as the first minister of Agriculture of Slovakia after the Velvet Revolution in the transition government of Milan Čič.

Belanský was born on 2 July 1941 in Hlohovec. He studied at the Slovak University of Agriculture, graduating in 1967. Until 1989 he led the agricultural cooperative in Cífer, where he introduced modernization measures. Following his stint as a minister he led the agricultural cooperative in Zavar.

As a minister he supported maintaining the agricultural cooperatives created by the communist regime in the colectivization process.

Belanský was a member of the Slovak Academy of Agricultural Sciences and a director of the Slovak Holstein Association.

On 3 January 2001, Belanský was awarded Pribina Cross third class by the president Rudolf Schuster.

Belanský died in Cífer on 27 May 2023, at the age of 81.
