= Jozef Čapla =

Slovak ice hockey player (1938–2023)

- Born: 1 September 1938 Bernolákovo, Czechoslovakia
- Died: 1 February 2023 (aged 84) Augsburg, Germany
- Position: Defenceman
- Played for: HC Slovan Bratislava; HC Dukla Jihlava; Augsburger EV
- National team: Czechoslovakia
- Playing career: 1955–1975
Medal record
Men's ice hockey
Representing Czechoslovakia
IIHF World Championship Division I
Silver medal – second place	1965 Finland

Jozef Čapla (1 September 1938 – 1 February 2023) was a Slovak ice hockey defenceman, coach and manager.

== Life ==
Čapla was born in Bernolákovo. From 1956 to 1969 he played for HC Slovan Bratislava, with the exception of two years of mandatory military service (1957–1959) when he played for HC Dukla Jihlava. He also played 32 matches for the Czechoslovakia men's national ice hockey team. At the 1965 Ice Hockey World Championships in Finland, the team including Čapla finished second, with Čapla contributing by scoring three goals and netting two assists.

Čapla devised a new way of curving the blade of a hockey stick, allowing a player to lift the puck while shooting. The enhanced sticks were produced by the firm Artis in Horažďovice under the label ALPAČ (Čapla backwards). In spite of the enormous popularity of the stick, Čapla received only 1,500 CSK for his invention.

In 1969 Čapla emigrated to West Germany, where he was joined by his family in 1972. Even though emigration from the communist Czechoslovakia was normally difficult, Čapla's family was allowed to leave because his wife and son held a German citizenship due to the German nationality of Čapla's father in law. In Germany, Čapla played for Augsburger EV and later trained for EV Füssen and EHC Freiburg.

Čapla was widely known as Jojo. In 2015 he wrote an autobiography Jojo Čapla – Hokejka Alpač, která změnila hokej ("Jojo Čapla - The stick Alpač, which changed hockey").

== Death ==
Čapla died in Augsburg on 1 February 2023, at the age of 84.
