= Karol Mikuláš =

Slovak miner, partisan and political prisoner (1922–2023)

- Born: 2 July 1922; Handlová, Czechoslovakia
- Died: 13 March 2023 (aged 100); Prievidza, Slovakia
- Occupation: Miner
- Known for: Fighting in the Slovak National Uprising and being a political prisoner in communist Czechoslovakia

Karol Mikuláš (2 July 1922 – 13 March 2023) was a Slovak miner, partisan, and political prisoner. He participated in the 1940 Handlová miners strike against the Fascist regime of the World War II era Slovak Republic and later fought as a partisan in the Slovak National Uprising. In 1955 he was arrested and sentenced to hard labor in a uranium mine by the Communist regime of the Czechoslovak Socialist Republic. Shortly before his death, he received the Order of Ľudovít Štúr 1st class as a recognition of lifelong dedication to the values of democracy.

== Early life ==
Mikuláš was born in July 1922 to a working-class family in the miner town of Handlová. His father, who was himself a miner, was strongly devoted to the ideals of social democracy. His family was strongly supportive of the young First Czechoslovak Republic because of the political persuasion of Mikuláš' father and also for allowing their children to receive education, which had previously not been accessible to working class children. As a pupil, young Mikuláš was highly impressed by the democratic ideals promoted by the Czech teacher Bláha, who came to Slovakia to teach underprivileged local children. As an 18 year old, Mikuláš started working in a coal mine. Not satisfied with the life of a simple miner, he pursued further education in the Slovak capital of Bratislava, where he obtained a High School diploma and started working at the General Directorate of the Handlová mining company.

== 1940 Miners' strike in Handlová ==
In 1940 Mikuláš actively participated in a large-scale strike of Handlová miners, which was the largest strike that took place in the World War II Slovakia during its existence. The strike represented a major challenge to the fascist regime narrative of national unity. The regime eventually managed to end the strike by force.

== Slovak National Uprising ==
Mikuláš' involvement in the 1940 strike attracted the attention of the regime. An arrest order was issued for avoiding military service. Mikuláš fled to the Štós baths, where he had spent two weeks as a child when his father was undergoing regeneration after an injury. He worked at the baths in exchange for food and lodging.

When he learned about an increased partisan activity, he boarded a train at Margecany, attempting to reach his family before the fighting started. Nonetheless, he never made it home as his train was boarded by anti-fascist fighters in Poprad, who informed the passengers about the start of the uprising and invited male travelers to join the fight. Answering their call, Mikuláš joined the local partisan garrison and, following a military training, fought against the regime and its German allies. He participated in a major battle near Telgárt.

Upon returning home after the war, he discovered his father died in the Sachsenhausen concentration camp, where he was deported following his arrest by Gestapo due to his Social Democratic convictions.

=== Persecution in the Communist Czechoslovakia ===
Following the war, Mikuláš became the main breadwinner for his family. He returned to mining. In 1955 he was accused of sabotage, conspiracy against state and arson. The pretext for the accusations were Mikuláš' efforts to introduce technological innovations to ease the physical harshness of mining. He was sentenced by the court in Nitra to 4.5 years of hard labor in a uranium mine near Příbram.

== Life after retirement ==
Mikuláš retired from mining in 1976. He spent the rest of his life in the Píly Housing Estate in the city of Prievidza, close to Handlová. Mikuláš and his wife were the first two inhabitants of the housing estate. Mikuláš was highly involved in its development, which he saw as integral to improving living conditions of miners as it was developed chiefly to provide adequate housing for the miners of the region.

During his retirement, Mikuláš devoted his days to tourism, going on long hikes well into his 90s. He resented what he saw as disproportionate blame being laid on miners for the climate change, arguing other human activities such as transpiration are also responsible for the harmful emissions. He argued the hard work and sacrifices made by miners should be remembered by the future generations.

On 13 January 2023, president Zuzana Čaputová awarded Mikuláš the Order of Ľudovít Štúr, 1st class. Mikuláš died in Prievidza on 13 March 2023, at the age of 100. His death was announced by the local miners' union. The public broadcaster Radio and Television of Slovakia commemorated the legacy of Mikuláš by airing a documentary about his life on 14 January.
