= Jozef Dravecký =

Slovak diplomat and mathematician (1947–2023)

- Born: 25 July 1947; Spišská Nová Ves, Czechoslovakia
- Died: 23 January 2023 (aged 75); Bratislava, Slovakia
- Occupation: diplomat
- Years active: 1973–2013

Jozef Dravecký (25 July 1947 – 23 January 2023) was a Slovak mathematician and diplomat. Between 1991 and 2013, he served as the ambassador of Slovakia to Bulgaria (1993–1998), the Baltic States (2000 – 2005) and the Holy See (2007–2013).

Dravecký was born in Spišská Nová Ves. He studied Sciences at the Comenius University graduating in 1971. In 1973 – 1990 he was a professor of Mathematical Analysis at the university.

In 2010, Dravecký was awarded the Knights Grand Cross of the Order of Pope Pius IX by the Pope Benedict XVI.

His death, on 23 January 2023 at the age of 75, was announced by the Chairman of the Christian Union of Pensioners Peter Mach in a Facebook post.
