= List of German bodybuilders =

This is a list of notable German bodybuilders, both male and female.

== A ==
- Achim Albrecht

== B ==
- Christa Bauch
- Monica Brant

== C ==
- Roland Cziurlock

== D ==
- David Hoffmann

== G ==
- Erika Geisen

== H ==
- David Hoffmann

== J ==
- Dennis James

== L ==
- Anja Langer
- Jana Linke-Sippl

== M ==
- Ralf Möller

== P ==
- Steve Pilot

== R ==
- Ronny Rockel
- Markus Rühl

== S ==
- Eugen Sandow
- Gunter Schlierkamp
- Armin Scholz
- Anja Schreiner
- Tina Schüßler
- Max Sick
- Lionel Strongfort

== T ==
- Sophia Thiel

== V ==
- Bianca Voitek

== W ==
- Jusup Wilkosz
- Kerstin Wöller
- Dennis Wolf

== See also ==
- List of British bodybuilders
- List of female professional bodybuilders
- List of male professional bodybuilders
