= List of Slovak women artists =

This is a list of women artists who were born in Slovakia or whose artworks are closely associated with that country.

== A ==
- Sarah Avni (active since 2010), contemporary artist

== B ==
- Zuzana Rabina Bachorikova (born 1961), painter, designer
- Mária Balážová (born 1956), contemporary artist

== F ==
- Jana Farmanová (born 1970), contemporary figurative painter

== K ==
- Lubica Kucerova (born 1983), fashion designer

== L ==
- Zuzana Licko (born 1961), Slovak-American typeface designer

== P ==
- Zora Palová (born 1947), glass artist

== S ==
- Petra Štefanková (born 1978), illustrator, designer, art director
- Veronika Sramaty (born 1977), painter
