= Jana (given name) =

- Gender: Female

Origin
- Origin: various unrelated
- Meaning: various

Jana is the spelling of several unrelated given names.

- In Albanian, short for Jehona which means "echo", other short names include Jona, Ana, Hona
- In Arabic Jana, is a noun which means "to Earn" or "to Reap" (Essentially making the name the Arabic equivalent of the name Theresa) and is used as a female name, but is pronounced as Janaa
- In Brazilian Portuguese, short for Janaína, a name Amerindian, is a female name of Tupi-Guarani origin. It derives from the combination of the terms "îana", which means "river" in Tupi, and "nã", which means "mother". The name can be interpreted as "mother of the river" or "meaning "queen of the seas"
- In Cantabria it is the feminine form of Jano, a Celtic god based on the Roman Janus (see also xana of Asturias)
- an old Catalan name
- In Hebrew (Hebrew: חַנָּה), Jana is a shortening of means "God is gracious"
- In Persian (Persian: جانا) its meaning is "my dearest" or "my soul"
- Jana is also the feminine form of the Roman god Janus.
- In Serbian and Croatian (Serbian: Јана, romanized: Jana), the name either originates from an abbreviation of the Roman name Juliana or as a hypocorism of the female Serbian variant of the Hebrew name John (Serbian: Јована, romanized: Jovana)

== People ==
- Jana (footballer)
- Jana (Native American singer)
- Jana (singer)
- Jana Alemam (born 2009), Egyptian-Canadian rhythmic gymnast
- Jana Andrsová (1939–2023), Czech ballerina and actress
- Jana Asher, American statistician and human rights activist
- Jana Assi (born 1999), Lebanese footballer
- Jana Bach (born 1979), German pornographic actress, model, and television host
- Jana Begum, Mughal Indian noblewoman and scholar
- Jana Beller (born 1990), Soviet-born German model
- Jana Bellin (born 1947), chess player
- Jana Bennett (1955–2022), American-born British media consultant
- Jana Bobošíková (born 1964), Czech politician
- Jana Bodnárová (born 1950), Slovak writer
- Jana Boková, Czech film director
- Jana Brejchová (1940–2026), Czech film actress
- Jana Budajová (born 1992), Slovak ice hockey player
- Jana Burčeska (born 1993), Macedonian singer
- Jana Carpenter (born 1971), American actress, singer and guitarist
- Jana Čepelová (born 1993), Slovak tennis player
- Jana Černá (1928–1981), Czech poet, writer and editor
- Jana Daubnerová (née Gereková, born 1984), Slovak biathlete
- Jana Dítětová (1926–1993), Czech film actress
- Jana Doleželová (born 1981), Czech actress, model, pharmacist and beauty pageant titleholder
- Jana Dörries (born 1975), German swimmer
- Jana Dukátová (born 1983), Slovak slalom canoeist
- Jana Duļevska (born 1980), Latvian actress and TV presenter
- Jana El-Alfy (born 2005), Egyptian basketball player
- Jana Elhassan (born 1985), Lebanese novelist and short story writer
- Jana Falsdóttir (born 2005), Icelandic basketball player
- Jana Farmanová (born 1970), Slovak contemporary figurative painter
- Jana Fesslová (born 1976), Czech Paralympic athlete
- Jana Fett (born 1996), Croatian tennis player
- Jana Galíková (born 1963), Czech orienteer
- Jana Gantnerová (born 1989), Slovak Alpine skier
- Jana Hlaváčková (born 1981), Czech tennis player
- Jana Horáková (born 1983), Czech BMX cyclist
- Jana Horn, American musician
- Jana Hubinská (born 1964), Slovak actress
- Jana Hunt, American politician
- Jana Hunter, American musician
- Jana Marie Hupp (born 1964), American actress
- Jana Hybášková (born 1965), Czech and European politician and diplomat
- Jana Ina (born 1976) Brazilian TV show host and model
- Jana Jacková (born 1982), Czech chess player
- Jana Jonášová (born 1943), Czech opera singer
- Jana Jurečková (born 1940), Czech statistician
- Jana Juřenčáková (born 1962), Czech politician and economist
- Jana Juricová (born 1987), Slovak tennis player
- Jana Kapustová (born 1983), Slovak ice hockey player
- Jana Khattab, Egyptian taekwondo practitioner
- Jana Khayat (born 1961), British businesswoman
- Jana Khokhlova (born 1985), Russian former competitive ice dancer
- Jana Kirschner (born 1978), Slovak singer and songwriter
- Jana Knedlíková (born 1989), Czech handballer
- Jana Kolarič (born 1954), Slovene author and translator
- Jana Komrsková (born 1983), Czech artistic gymnast
- Jana Korbasová (born 1974), Slovak swimmer
- Jana Koščak (born 2006), Croatian multi-event track and field athlete
- Jana Košecká, Slovak-American computer scientist
- Jana Kramer (born 1983), American actress and country music singer
- Jana Krausová, (born 1954), Czech actress
- Jana Krishnamurthi (1928–2007), Indian political leader
- Jana Kubičková-Posnerová (born 1945), Slovak gymnast
- Jana Kubovčáková, Slovak slalom canoeist
- Jana Linke-Sippl (born 1968), Austrian bodybuilder
- Jana Majunke (born 1990), German Paralympic cyclist
- Jana Malik (born 1974), Pakistani actress
- Jana McKinnon, Austrian-Australian actress
- Jana Moravcová (1937–2018), Czech poet, writer and translator
- Jana Mrázková (born 1940), Czech figure skater
- Jana Müller (born 1978), German volleyball player
- Jana Nejedly (born 1974), Czech-Canadian tennis player
- Jana Novotná (1968–2017), Czech tennis player
- Jana Obrovská (1930 – 1987), Czech composer
- Jana Pallaske (born 1979), German actress
- Jana Pittman (born 1982), Australian athlete
- Jana Plauchová (born 1987), Slovak writer
- Jana Plodková (born 1981), Czech actress
- Jana Pospíšilová (born 1970), Czech tennis player
- Jana Rabasová (1933 – 2008), Czech gymnast
- Jana Revedin (born 1965), architect
- Jana Riess (born 1969), American writer and editor
- Jana Rodriguez Hertz (born 1970), Argentine-Uruguayan mathematician
- Jana S. Rošker (born 1960), Slovenian sinologist
- Jana Roxas (born 1990), Filipino actress
- Jana Rybářová (synchronized swimmer) (born 1978), Czech synchronized swimmer
- Jana Šaldová (born 1975), Czech cross country skier
- Jana Šikulová (born 1988), Czech artistic gymnast
- Jana Šimánková (born 1980), Czech volleyball player
- Jana Sinyor (born 1976), Canadian television writer and producer
- Jana Šramková (born 1976), Czech rhythmic gymnast
- Jana Sterbak, Czech-Canadian artist
- Jana Šulcová (1947–2023), Czech actress
- Jana Švandová (born 1947), Czech actress
- Jana Sýkorová (born 1973), Czech operatic contralto
- Jana Taylor (1943–2004), American actress
- Jana Thiel (1971–2016), German sports presenter and journalist
- Jana Tichá (born 1965), Czech astronomer
- Jana Tucholke (born 1981), German discus thrower
- Jana Vaľová (born 1965), Slovak politician
- Jana Velďáková (born 1981), Slovak long jumper
- Jana Veselá (born 1983), Czech basketball player
- Jana Vojteková (born 1991), Slovak footballer
- Jana Wendt (born 1956), Australian television journalist
- Jana Zvěřinová (born 1937), Czech slalom canoeist

== Fictional entities ==
- Jana, a fictitious character in the television series Containment
- Jana Hawkes Fisher, a character on the American soap opera The Young and the Restless
- Jana von Lahnstein, fictional character in the German soap opera Verbotene Liebe (Forbidden Love)
- Jana of the Jungle

== See also ==
- Jaana
- Jana (disambiguation)
- Janus (disambiguation)
