= Avni =

Avni may refer to:

== Given name ==
- Avni Akgün, Turkish long jumper
- Avni Akyol (1931–1999), Turkish educator and politician
- Avni Arbaş (1919–2003), Turkish artist
- Avni bej Delvina, a signatory of the Albanian Declaration of Independence
- Avni Doshi (born 1982), American novelist
- Avni Klinaku (born 1965), Albanian politician and nationalist
- Avni Kurgan (1912–1979), Turkish footballer
- Avni Mula (1928–2020), Albanian singer
- Avni Özgürel (born 1948), Turkish journalist, author, and screenwriter
- Avni Pepa (born 1988), Norwegian-Albanian footballer
- Avni Qahili (born 1967), Macedonian television presenter, songwriter, and musician
- Avni Rustemi (1895–1924), Albanian teacher, activist, and MP
- Avni Sali (born 1940), Australian surgeon, researcher, author, and media personality
- Avni Shah, American computer scientist and business executive
- Avni Spahiu (born 1953), Kosovar politician
- Avni Yildirim (born 1991), Turkish professional boxer
- Avni Zogiani (born 1970), Albanian activist, critic, lawyer, and journalist
- Hüseyin Avni (disambiguation), various Turkish military personnel

== Other ==
- Avni (surname)
- Avni Institute of Art and Design, art school in Tel-Aviv
- Avni Cinemax
