= Janika =

Janika is a given name. The feminine name is a diminutive form of the name Jana. The English equivalent of the name is Janice. Pronounced yah-nee-kah. It may refer to:

== People ==
Female:

- Janika Mölder (born 1970), Estonian rhythmic gymnast and coach
- Janika Sillamaa (born 1975), Estonian singer and actress
- Janika Vandervelde (born 1955), American composer

Male:

- Janika Balázs (1925–1988), tamburitza musician and band leader from Vojvodina, Serbia

== Film ==
- Janika (film), a 1949 Hungarian comedy film

== See also ==
- Janica
- Janika is a Dutch rock band from The Hague
