= Wöller =

Wöller, Woeller, or Woller is a surname. Notable people with the surname include:

- Frank E. Woller (1859–1941), Wisconsin politician
- Kerstin Wöller (born 1967), German bodybuilding champion
- Kirk B. R. Woller (born 1962), American actor in TV shows and movies, including Agent Gene Crane on The X-Files
- Klaus Woeller (born 1934), German field hockey player
- Klaus Wöller (1956–2024), West German handball player who competed in the 1984 Summer Olympics
- Steffen Wöller (born 1972), German luger who competed from 1991 to 2004
