= Avni (surname) =

Avni is a Hebrew-language surname (Hebrew: אבני) literally meaning "stony".

- Aharon Avni (1906–1951), Israeli painter
- Aki Avni (born 1967), Israeli actor, entertainer and television host
- Baruch Avni, Soviet and Israeli poet, translator, and publicist
- Eliran Avni, Israeli pianist
- Micah Lakin Avni (born 1969), Israeli businessman, attorney and a human rights and anti-terrorism activist
- Ran Avni, founder of the Jewish Repertory Theatre
- Ronit Avni, Canadian entrepreneur, tech founder, human rights advocate, and film director and producer
- Sarah Avni, Slovak artist
- Tom Avni (born 1986), Israeli actor, TV host, director and voice actor
- Tzvi Avni (born 1927), Israeli composer
- Yoav Avni (born 1969), Israeli author and translator
- Yosef Avni (1924–2021), Irgun activist
- Yossi Avni-Levy (born 1962), Israeli writer and diplomat
