= Jurečka =

Jurečka (feminine Jurečková) is a Czech surname. Notable people with the surname include:

- Alexandr Jurečka (1990–2015), Czech judoka
- Jana Jurečková (born 1940), Czech statistician
- Marian Jurečka (born 1981), Czech politician
- Václav Jurečka (born 1994), Czech footballer
