= Janica =

Janica is a Slavic female given name, generally used in Croatia, the diminutive form of the name Jana. The English equivalent of the name is Janice or Janie.

== People ==
Notable women named Janica:

- Janica Kostelić, Croatian female alpine skier

== Fictional characters ==
- The female protagonist of Slavko Kolar's Breza, and Ante Babaja's movie Breza, is called Janica.

== Other ==
- JAniCA initialism for Japanese Animation Creators Association.

== See also ==
- Janika
- Giannitsa, Greece
