= Černčice (Louny District) =

- Municipality
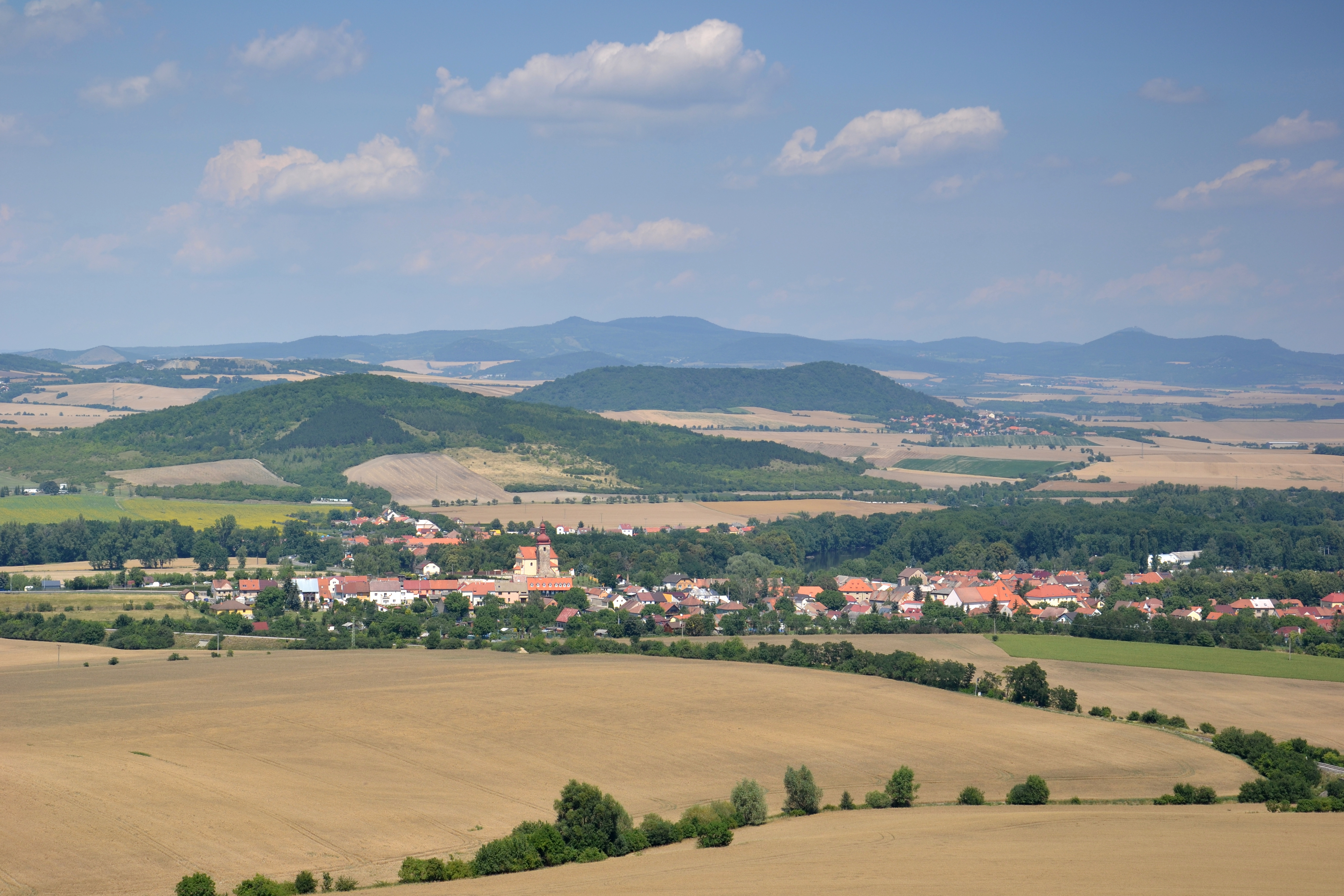
- Panorama of Černčice

- Flag Coat of arms

- Location in the Czech Republic
- Coordinates: 50°21′41″N 13°50′43″E
- Country: Czech Republic
- Region: Ústí nad Labem
- District: Louny
- First mentioned: 1354

Area
  - Total: 2.74 km^{2} (1.06 sq mi)
- Elevation: 185 m (607 ft)

Population (2026-01-01)
  - Total: 1,311
  - Density: 478/km^{2} (1,240/sq mi)
- Time zone: UTC+1 (CET)
  - Summer (DST): UTC+2 (CEST)
- Postal code: 439 01
- Website: www.cerncice.cz

Černčice is a municipality and village in Louny District in the Ústí nad Labem Region of the Czech Republic. It has about 1,300 inhabitants.

Černčice lies approximately 4 kilometres (2 mi) east of Louny, 36 km (22 mi) south-west of Ústí nad Labem, and 52 km (32 mi) north-west of Prague.

== Demographics ==
Historical population
Year	Pop.	±%
1869	341	—
1880	399	+17.0%
1890	450	+12.8%
1900	692	+53.8%
1910	1,147	+65.8%
1921	1,292	+12.6%
1930	1,496	+15.8%
1950	1,329	−11.2%
1961	1,286	−3.2%
1970	1,234	−4.0%
1980	1,396	+13.1%
1991	1,287	−7.8%
2001	1,402	+8.9%
2011	1,325	−5.5%
2021	1,275	−3.8%
Source: Censuses

== Notable people ==
- Jana Moravcová (1937–2018), writer
