= Armin Scholz =

German bodybuilder and gym owner

- Professional bodybuilder

Personal info
- Born: January 31, 1976 (age 50); Leipzig, GDR

Best statistics
- Height: ft in
- Weight: lb

Professional (Pro) career
- Pro-debut: 2003
- Best win: 2008 Houston Pro, 4th

Armin Scholz is a German professional bodybuilder and gym owner.

Scholz was born in Leipzig, German Democratic Republic, in 1976, to Joachim and Monika Scholz. Armin has two siblings: sister Gabriela and brother Martin.

In 1982-1990 Armin attended school and in 1990-1994 a 'Sportgymnasium'. In 1992 Scholz started training as a bodybuilder. In 1994-1995 and 1997-2001 he was a student at the Sports Department of the Leipzig University.

== Competitive stats ==
- Height: 1' 88" (m)
- Competitive weight:
- chest "
- arms "
- waist "
- thigh "
- calf "

== Competitive history ==
- 1993 Sachsenmeisterschaft, 1st and Overall
- 1994 Sachsenmeisterschaft, 1st and Overall
- 1995 Badenwurthembergische Mesiterschaft, 1 and Overall
- 1995 Sachsenmeisterschaft, 1st and Overall
- 1995 Deutsche Meisterschaft, 1st and Overall
- 1996 Junior –WM-Quali, 1st
- 1998 Sachsenmeisterschaft, 1st and Overall
- 1998 Deutsche Meisterschaft, 1st
- 1999 WM-Quali Men's, Best Men's IV Athlete
- 2002 Thuringenmeitershaft, 2nd
- 2002 Deutsche Meisterschaft, 1st
- 2005 Europa Pro-GP, 10th
- 2005 Charlotte Pro-GP, 11th
- 2005 Mr Olympia Wildcard, 6th
- 2006 Ironman-Pro, 10th
- 2006 San Francisco Pro-GP, 8th
- 2007 Santa Susanna Pro-GP, 4th
- 2008 Atlantic City Pro, 16th
- 2008 Ironman Pro, 17th
- 2008 Houston Pro, 4th

== See also ==
- List of German bodybuilders
- List of male professional bodybuilders
- Ofer Samra
