= Jana Moravcová =

Czech writer, poet, and translator (1937–2018)

Jana Moravcová, married Jana Neumannová (8 May 1937 in Černčice – 12 June 2018) was a Czech poet, writer, and translator. She had a degree from Charles University and taught in Cuba. Some of her work appeared in science fiction anthologies.
