= Ran Avni =

American theatre director

Ran Avni is the founder of the Jewish Repertory Theatre (JRT) and was its artistic director from 1974 till 2004. JRT specialized in Jewish related plays in English and grew over its 30-year history to become a major theatrical institution in New York City. His vision for the company was to produce material "about Jewishness, about roots, about their value, their loss, the search for roots, the distaste of roots, the joy of roots". JRT produced original works by renowned playwrights such as Arthur Miller, Arthur Laurents, and Galt MacDermot, and presented rare revivals by the likes of Jerry Herman, David Mamet, Ira Levin and many more. As important as the theater's role in developing and presenting plays by new playwrights and was its role in launching the careers of actors, directors and designers. The theater was privileged to work with stars like Dianne Wiest and F. Murray Abraham as well as numerous prominent New York theater actors. Mr. Avni also directed many of the theater's productions, plays among them 'Up From Paradise', 'The Grand Tour', and 'Kuni Leml', for which he received the Outer Critics' Circle Award and was cited in the 1984-85 "Best Plays" publication as best director of a musical Off or On Broadway. He directed the Broadway production of 'Yiddle with a Fiddle', an English adaptation of the Yiddish classic. Many of the more than 120 productions the theater presented over the years have moved into commercial venues in New York and nationally.

Avni, an alumnus of Emerson College, lives in Manhattan with his wife, Betsy Finston, and their daughter.
