= Zuzana Bachoríková =

Slovak artist and designer (born 1961)

Zuzana Rabina Bachoríková (born 25 September 1961, in Bratislava, Czechoslovakia, now Slovakia) is a Slovak artist and designer. Between 1976 and 1980, she studied at the School of Applied Arts in Bratislava. She has worked at painting, drawing, graphic design, and illustration, as well as fashion and interior design. She is the co-founder of the fashion brand ZURABA. Her works are represented in the collections of galleries in Slovakia, the Czech Republic, Japan, Switzerland, the Netherlands, Belgium, Africa, Australia and the United States.

Bachoríková materializes images that can be seen in meditation: images that may be glimpsed under one´s eyelids. Each painting has many layers of meaning, a lot of symbolism and fantasy, transcending the boundaries of time and space. Each composition is based on effort to use maximum imagination, on bold colouring, and sometimes on sharp colour pigments as dominant structural elements and on the author´s independent poetics resulting from projection and conjunction of different semantic contexts.

== Family ==
Bachorikova is married to artist Oto Bachorík. They have a son, Jakub Bachorík, who is an artist in Eastern Europe and a daughter who is an actress and lives in England.
