= David Hoffmann (bodybuilder) =

German professional bodybuilder (born 1980)

David Hoffman
- Professional bodybuilder
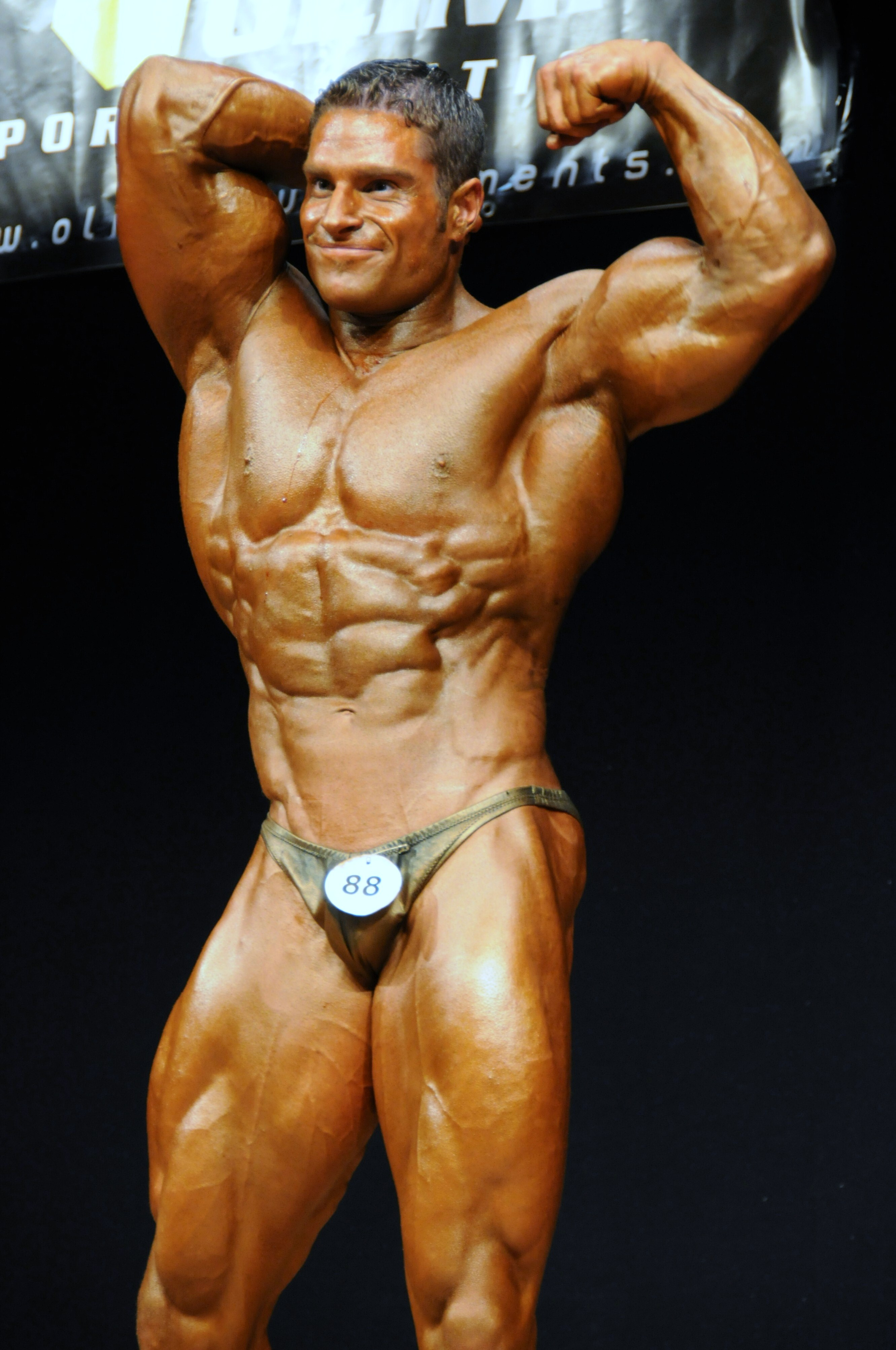
- David Hoffmann, 2008

Personal info
- Born: February 26, 1980 (age 46); Kirchheimbolanden, West Germany

Best statistics
- Height: 6 ft 1 in (1.85 m)
- Weight: 250 lb (110 kg) (contest); 285 lb (129 kg) (off-season)
- Pro-debut: 2000
- Best win: Dennis James Classic; (2018); (2019)

David Hoffmann (born February 26, 1980) is a German professional bodybuilder.

== Biography ==
Hoffmann was born in 1980 as the first of three sons of a psychologist and a teacher. After some judo experience he started bodybuilding in 1995. For one year he trained in his home gym, and in 1996 he joined a public gym. His first show was the Nordrhein-Westphalen championship 2000, where he won the junior heavyweight division. Winning the overall title at the German nationals in 2008 was the next milestone in his bodybuilding career. Since 2008 Hoffmann competes successfully in international IFBB competitions.

Hoffmann has a degree in business administration (Diplom-Betriebswirt (FH)) and runs a supplement business and a gym.

== Personal ==
Hoffmann has been featured on the cover of several fitness magazines such as Musclemag and Sportrevue, and appeared in the Netflix series In Pursuit of Perfection in the episode "Human Playground". He currently lives in Lahnstein.

== Competitive placings ==
- 2021 6. Place IFBB Mr. Big Evolution Pro (Classic Physique)
- 2020 12. Place Mr Olympia (Classic Physique)
- 2019 Winner Dennis James Classic Germany (Classic Physique)
- 2019 3. Place Yamamoto Cup, Padua (Classic Physique)
- 2019 11. Place Mr Olympia (Classic Physique)
- 2018 Winner Dennis James Classic Germany (Classic Physique)
- 2018 11. Place Mr Olympia (Classic Physique)
- 2018 Winner Veronica Gallego Classic (Classic Physique)
- 2018 Winner San Marino Pro (Classic Physique)
- 2018 3. Place New York Pro (Classic Physique)
- 2015 Winner Mr. Olympia Amateur (super heavy weight and overall)
- 2014 Winner Deutsche Meisterschaft (German championshop)
- 2013 Winner Deutsche Meisterschaft (German championshop)
- 2011 3. Place Mr. Olympia Amateur (Super heavyweight)
- 2011 3. Place Arnold Schwarzenegger Classic Amateur (Super heavyweight)
- 2009 4. Place IFBB World Championships, Doha Qatar (Super heavyweight)
- 2009 Winner World Championship qualification Germany
- 2008 4. Place IFBB World Championships Manama, Bahrain (Super heavyweight)
- 2008 Winner World Championship qualification Germany
- 2008 2. Place Body Xtreme Invitational
- 2008 Winner German nationals (Super heavyweight and overall)
- 2008 Winner Hessen- and RLP-Championship (Super heavyweight)
- 2008 Winner Heavyweight Pokal
- 2006 Winner Hessen- and RLP-Championship (Super heavyweight)
- 2004 4. Place German nationals (Heavyweight)
- 2004 Winner Juniors Hessen- and RLP-Championship (Heavyweight)
- 2000 Runner up Juniors German nationals (Heavyweight)
- 2000 Winner Juniors Hessen- and RLP-Championship (Heavyweight and overall)
- 2000 Winner Juniors NRW Championship (Heavyweight and overall)
