= Steve Pilot =

German model, author, fitness trainer

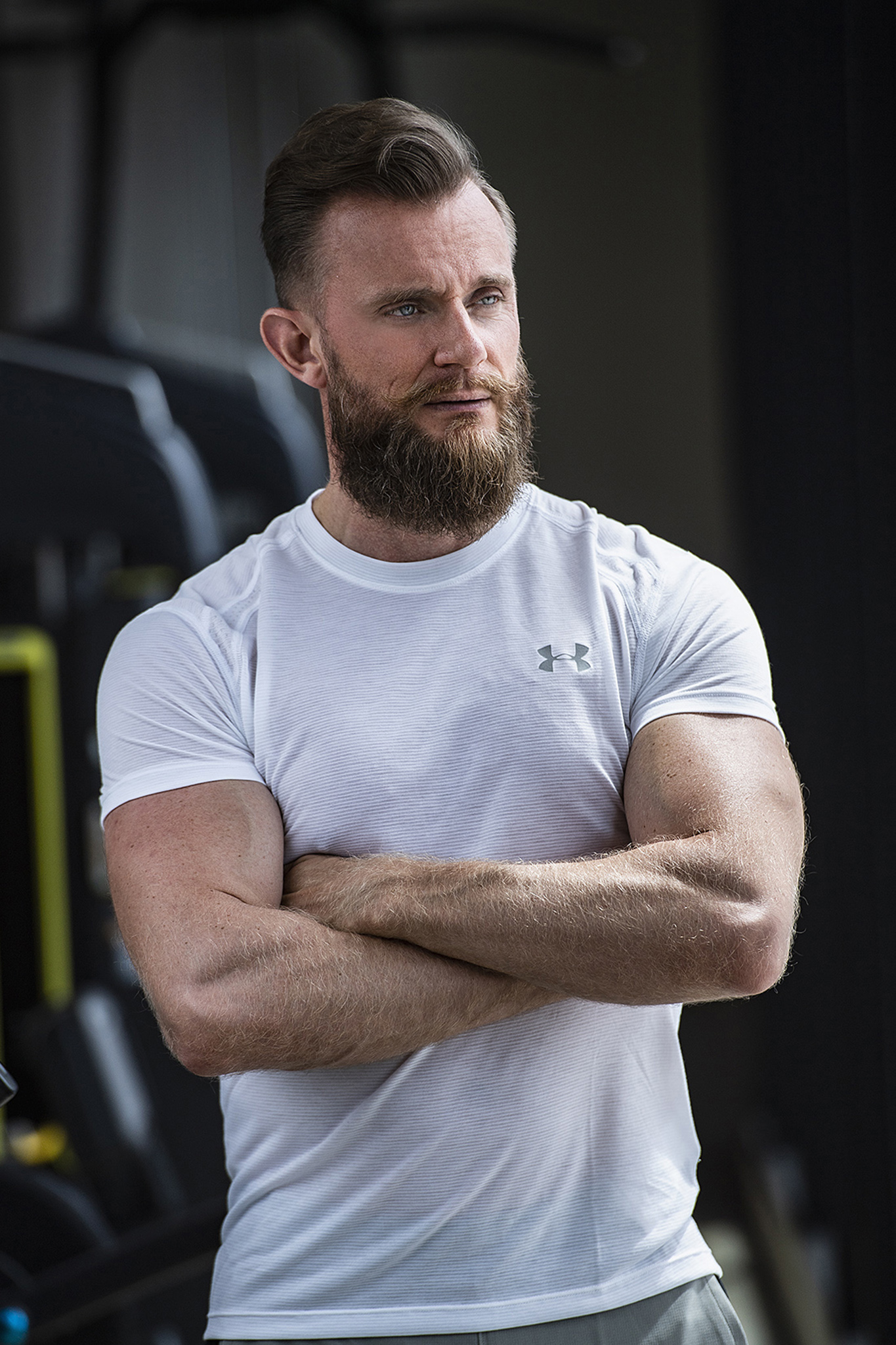
- Born: October 9, 1980 (age 46); Munich, Germany
- Occupations: Model, Nutritionist, Fitness Trainer, Author
- Website: https://www.stevepilotfitness.com/

Steve Pilot (born October 9, 1980) is a German model, author, fitness trainer, and vegan nutritionist who is based in Bangkok, Thailand. As a model he has appeared on Muscle and Fitness magazine, Center Stage Magazine and Men's Health. He has been featured in several magazines such as Phanganist, Bangkok101, Yoga Magazine and World Vegan Magazine.

Pilot has worked with celebrities such as Araya A. Hargate, Shannon Wiratchai, and Lydia Sarunrat Deane.

== Early life and education ==
Pilot was born on October 9, 1980, in Munich, Germany. He earned a bachelor's degree in engineering in 2000. Pilot served for two years in the German Special Forces as a paratrooper before returning to school to study for a Master's in Automotive Engineering. Pilot was inspired to adopt a vegan diet after a traveling around the world eating meatless meals and watching the documentary film Earthlings.

He trained in weightlifting, bodybuilding, CrossFit, strength and conditioning, and martial arts (Wing Chun).

Steve holds certifications in CPR/ AED, Precision Nutrition and National Academy of Sports Medicine.

== Career ==
Initially pursuing a career in engineering, Pilot eventually moved to Bangkok, Thailand to start Steve Pilot Fitness, a personal training business. In Thailand, Pilot eventually became one of the Phuket-based gym Unit 27's sponsored athletes. As a model, Pilot has appeared on the cover of Muscle and Fitness magazine, and Center Stage Magazine in 2015 and 2021. He has also appeared in Men's Health. He has also modeled for brands such as Sunnex Jeans and appeared in music videos such as "Don't Say Yes" by Bankk Cash and "Cursed" by Lunatic. Pilot is an ambassador for brands such as Sun Warrior, Finn & Gunnar, and Reebok.

Pilot's fitness and nutrition tips have also been in publications. He has also had feature articles written about him in Yoga Magazine and World Vegan Magazine.

Pilot has worked with Thai based celebrities such as Araya A. Hargate, Shannon Wiratchai, and Lydia Sarunrat Deane.

== Vegan activism ==
Pilot is a vegan nutrition and animal rights activist encouraging plant based diets and a cruelty-free approach to animals. Pilot's fitness regimen is based on vegan and plant-based.

== Bibliography ==
- Pilot, S. (2020). Get Fit Program:Mindset|Nutrition|Fitness. ASIN B08F3PFJ6R
- Pilot, S. (2020). Vegan for Beginners Guide. ASIN B08F3QZCWS

== Selected publications ==
- Pilot, S. (October 2022) "The Body and Mind Connection." Global Vegan Magazine - Issue 3.
- Pilot, S. ( 2021-06-13) "Handstands – how being upside down boosts your health and fitness". South China Morning Post.
- Pilot, S. (2021-06-15) "Handstands – their well being and wellness benefits for you, from improved center solidarity to inward harmony". youheal.net.
- Pilot, S. (2021-10-30) "How to Lose Weight on a Plant Based Vegan Diet". phanganist.com.
- Pilot, S. (2022-07-07) "The Secret 4-Fit Method by Steve Pilot". phanganist.com.
