= Jana S. Rošker =

Slovenian sinologist, specialized in Chinese philosophy

Jana Rošker
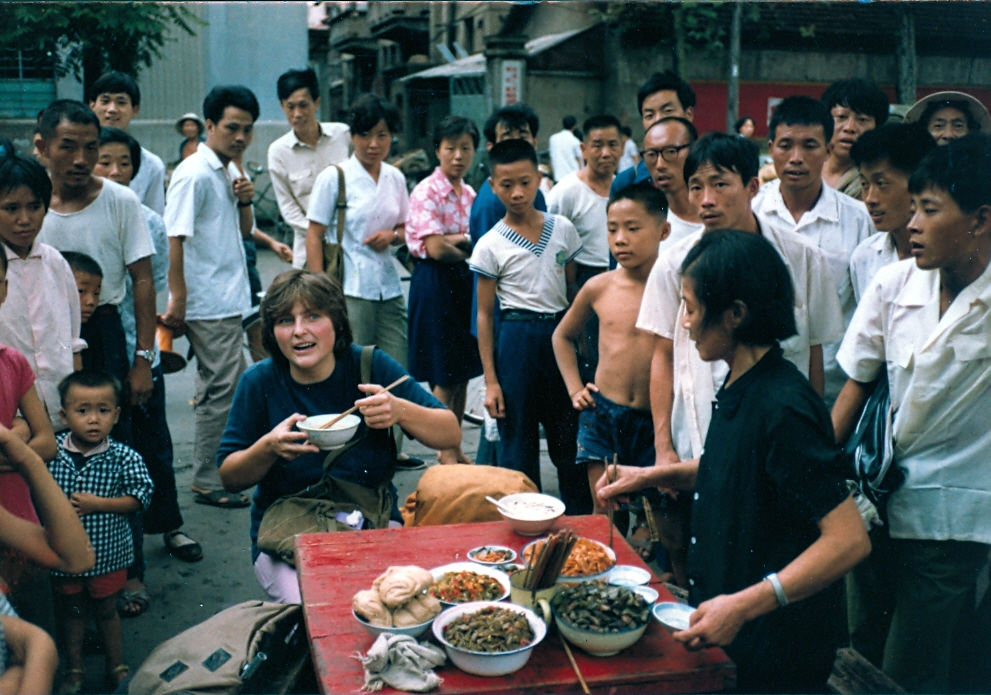
- In China in 1982
- Born: 21 May 1960 (age 66); Murska Sobota

Academic background
- Education: University of Vienna

Academic work
- Discipline: Sinology
- Sub-discipline: Chinese philosophy
- Main interests: Chinese Philosophy, Chinese Political Thought, New Confucianism, Modern Chinese Political Thought, Contemporary New Confucianism, Confucian Philosophy, Comparative Philosophy, Philosophy of Logic, History of Informal Logic, Epistemology, Historical Epistemology

Jana S. Rošker (Chinese: 罗亚娜; born 21 May 1960) is a Slovenian sinologist.

== Biography ==
Jana Rošker was born in 1960 in Murska Sobota. She was a student of sinology, journalism and pedagogy at the University of Vienna. She has also studied at Beijing Foreign Studies University, Nankai University and Beijing University. Rošker received her PhD from the University of Vienna in 1988 for her thesis Theories of the State and Anarchist Criticism of the State in China at the Turn of the Century (original in German: 'Staatstheorien und anarchistische Staatskritik in China um die Jahrhundertwende'). During her studies and later in life, she spent over ten years in People's Republic of China and Taiwan.

== Academic career ==
In her research she mostly examines subjects related to Modern Chinese philosophy, Chinese logic, Chinese epistemology, the methodology of intercultural research and the theory of knowledge. In these research fields, she has published over 30 books, a dozen edited volumes, as well as over 300 articles and chapters in monographs. From 1996 to 2022, she was a professor at the Department of Asian Studies at the Faculty of Arts of the University of Ljubljana. She is one of the founders of this department and chaired it for several years.

Rošker is the co-founder, the first president, and honorary member of the European Association for Chinese Philosophy and the chief editor of the academic journal Asian Studies. Since 2018, she serves as the representative of the Republic of Slovenia to the International Confucian Association (ICA). From 2024 to 2025, she is serving as the president of the International Society for Chinese Philosophy.

She was one of the hosts of the XVI. Biennial Conference of the European Association of Chinese Studies, which was held in Ljubljana in 2006, and the chief organizer of many other international conferences in Chinese studies, particularly those devoted to Chinese philosophies. As president of the International Society of Chinese Philosophy (ISCP), she was the chief organizer of the 2025 jubilee international conference, marking the 50th anniversary of this oldest and most influential global society dedicated to research on Chinese philosophy.

She has served as a guest professor and researcher at the University of Vienna (2012–2013), National Taiwan University (2019), Beijing Normal University (2020), the Center for Chinese Studies at the National Central Library in Taipei (1995, 2000, 2006, 2018), Academia Sinica (2024), and many other academic institutions.

== Theory and research ==
In the field of a specific hermeneutic theory developed within the Sinophone sphere, Rošker built on Chung-ying Cheng's concept of onto-hermeneutics and, through a critical evaluation of Schleiermacher and Gadamer, developed the theory of the fusion of aesthetic spheres (jingjie ronghe 境界融合). Drawing on Roger Ames’s notion of role ethics and Li Zehou's concepts of guanxizhuyi 关系主义 (relationism) and zhutixing 主体性 (subjectality), she is developing a critical theory of relational ethics, within which she addresses the problem of the subject’s freedom through the lens of the relationship between relational selfhood and autonomy. She developed a new theoretical model for transcultural research and the discursive integration of Chinese and European philosophical paradigms by uncovering the role of semantic frameworks of reference in shaping philosophical interactions across different conceptual traditions. Her most influential contribution to recent developments in Chinese and transcultural philosophy, as well as in the methodology of intercultural research, is the dialectical method of transcultural philosophical sublation, which she has been developing throughout the 2020s. This is a comparative approach that seeks to overcome the dualistic mode of interaction between different philosophical traditions by integrating their concepts, ideas, or systems through a dynamic process of critical engagement, preservation, and transformation. Unlike classical Hegelian dialectics, which is grounded in identitarian philosophy and the basic laws of formal logic, this method draws on the principle of dynamic correlative complementarity developed in classical Chinese philosophy. Its significance lies in promoting genuine philosophical dialogue beyond cultural essentialism, fostering mutual enrichment between diverse modes of thought, particularly between Chinese and Western philosophies.

== Prizes and awards ==
- 2010: Great Prize of the Faculty of Arts, University of Ljubljana
- 2013: Slovene National Research Agency (ARRS) Award for an extraordinary research achievement in humanities – for the book Chinese Philosophy and the Paradigm of Structure
- 2015: Zois Award – Slovene national award for research achievements – for the book Searching for the Way - Theories of Knowledge in pre-Modern and Modern China
- 2015: Golden Plaque of the University of Ljubljana for contributions in research and high education
- 2020: French-Taiwanese Cultural Foundation Award (Prix de la Fondation culturelle franco-taïwanaise)
- 2022: Bertrand Russell Book Award – for the book Bertrand Russell's Visit to China – Selected Texts on the Centenary of Intercultural Dialogues in Logic and Epistemology (together with Jan Vrhovski)
- 2023: University of Ljubljana Award for the most outstanding research achievement – for the book Interpreting Chinese Philosophy - A New Methodology
- 2025: World Sinology Outstanding Achievement Award, awarded by the World Sinology Research centre at the BLCU, P.R. China for outstanding academic achievements in Sinology and Chinese studies

== Books in English ==
- 2007: Searching for the Way: Theory of Knowledge in Pre-modern and Modern China; Hong Kong; Chinese University Press.
- 2012: Traditional Chinese Philosophy and the Paradigm of Structure (Li); Newcastle upon Tyne; Cambridge Scholars Publishing
- 2016: The Rebirth of the Moral Self: the Second Generation of Modern Confucians and their Modernization Discourses; Hong Kong; Chinese University of Hong Kong Press
- 2019: Following His Own Path – Li Zehou and Contemporary Chinese Philosophy; Albany; SUNY Press
- 2020: Becoming Human – Li Zehou's Ethics; Leiden, Boston; Brill Publishers
- 2021: Female Philosophers in Contemporary Taiwan and the Problem of Women in Chinese Thought; Newcastle upon Tyne; Cambridge Scholars Publishing
- 2021: Interpreting Chinese Philosophy: A New Methodology; London, New York; Bloomsbury Academic
- 2023: Humanism in Trans-Civilizational Perspectives – Relational Subjectivity and Social Ethics in Classical Chinese Philosophy; Cham; Springer Publishing
- 2023: Confucian Relationism and Global Ethics – Alternative Models of Ethics and Axiology in Times of Global Crises; Leiden, Boston; Brill Publishers
- 2025: Epistemological Theory in Classical Chinese Philosophy: In Search of the Way; Newcastle upon Tyne; Cambridge scholars
- 2025: Chinese Philosophy in Transcultural Contexts: Comparative Approaches and the Method of Sublation; London; Bloomsbury.
