= Petra Štefanková =

Slovak illustrator, digital artist, designer and art director

Petra Štefanková FRSA
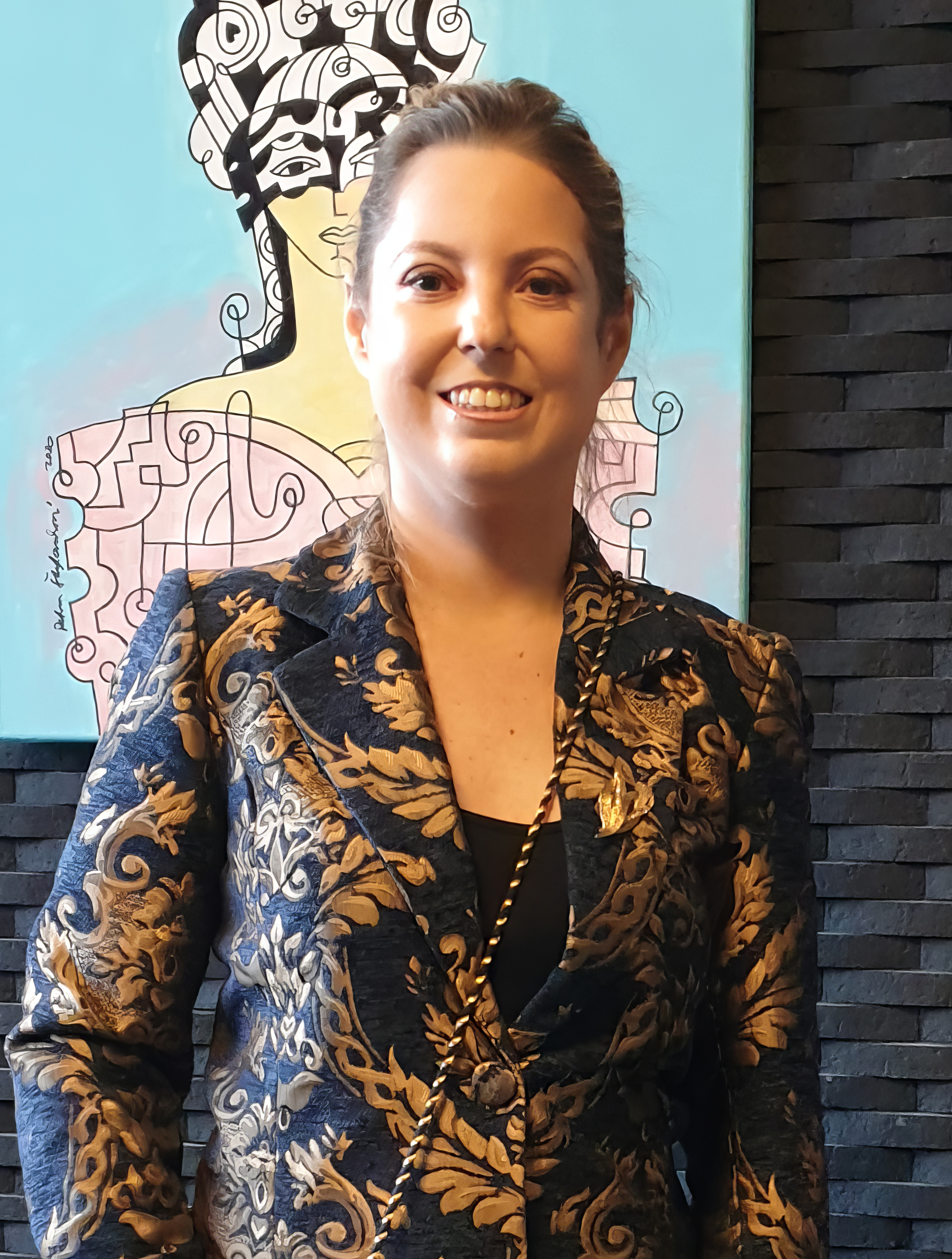
- Štefanková in 2022
- Born: 1978 (age 47–48); Bratislava
- Occupations: Designer; illustrator; digital artist; painter; animation director; art director; author
- Organization: The Royal Society of Arts
- Known for: Čmáranica a Machuľa, The Fly on the Honey Bread, Illustration: A Theoretical and Contextual Perspective
- Awards: Channel 4's 4Talent Award, American Illustration 42 Award, Toray DCA Excellence Award
- Website: petrastefankova.com

Petra Štefanková (born 1978) is a Slovak illustrator, digital artist, designer, painter, art director and author. She has worked in the animation, advertising and publishing industries with an emphasis on an interdisciplinary approach. Her work represents the fusion of contemporary art and design.

== Background ==
Štefanková studied graphic design at School of Applied Arts Josefa Vydru in Bratislava in 1993–1997, visual communication at the Academy of Fine Arts and Design in Bratislava in 1997–2003 a film and TV graphics at the Academy of Arts, Architecture and Design in Prague in 2002. Additionally, she took a short course at Central Saint Martins, University of the Arts London in 2016.

Between the years 2004 and 2011, Štefanková was a member of the Digital Illustrator Discovery Organisation founded by the Japanese illustrator, visual artist and lecturer Marty M. Ito alias Paintmonster, and the association held group exhibitions at commercial premises across Sapporo, Hokkaido in Japan.

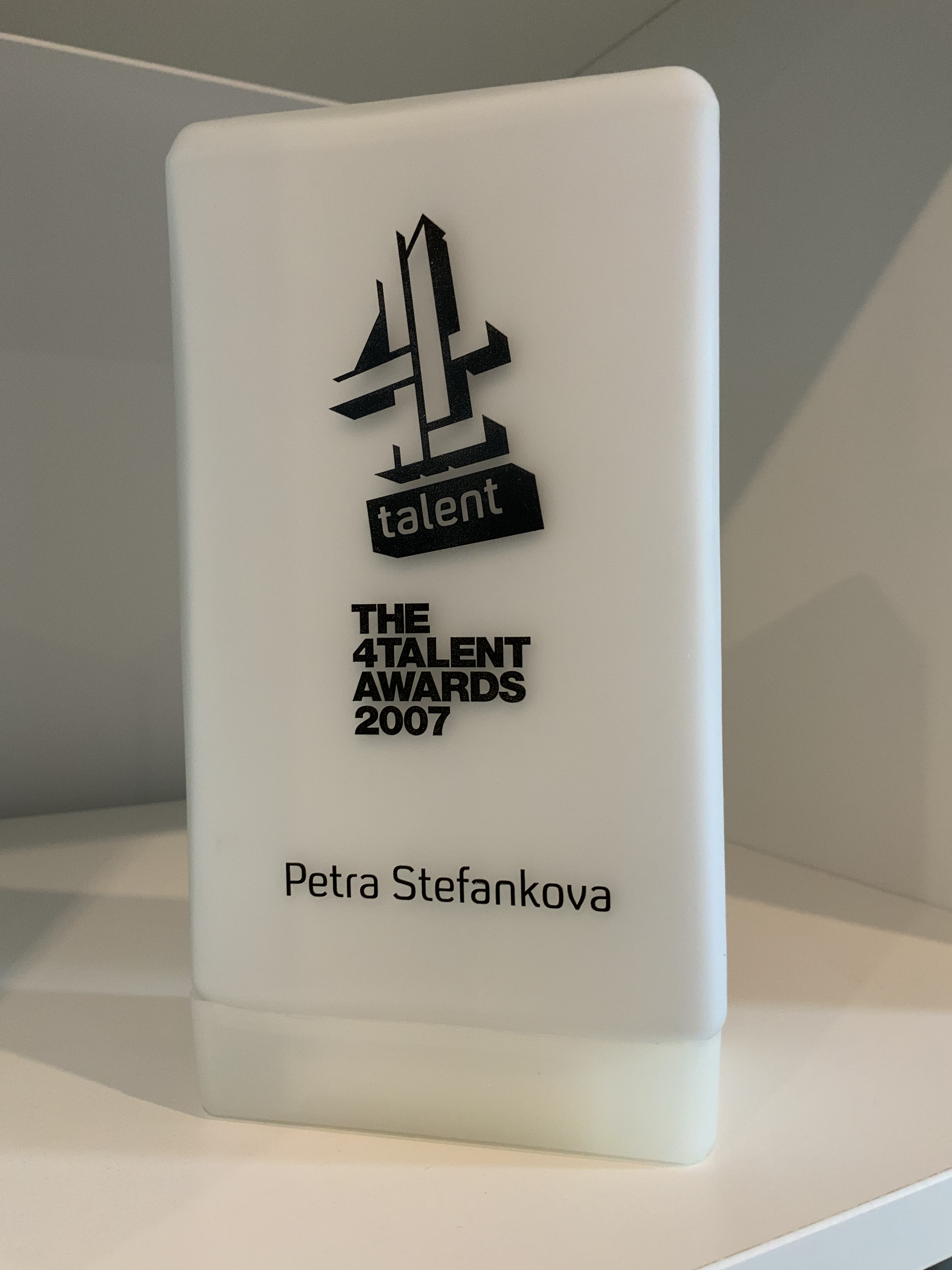
The trophy of Channel4's 4Talent Award 2007

In December 2007, she won "Channel 4's 4Talent Award". www.channel4.com. Archived from the original on 2008-10-11. for young creatives from all creative industries in the United Kingdom. She presented her work at "Graphite 2007". graphite.siggraph.org. Archived from the original on 8 December 2007., the digital art exhibition and conference organised by the North American and Australian chapter of the ACM SIGGRAPH at the University of Western Australia in Perth. Her work was exposed widely on shows worldwide. Australian curator Andrew Chew selected her work for the "GAS Project exhibition 2007". www.senseassault.com. Archived from the original on 22 December 2008., along with a special guest, Doze Green from NYC. Global Gallery in Sydney presented her work, LACDA in Los Angeles and the Heritage Museum in Hong Kong.

In July 2007, she was selected for exhibition at Images 31: The Best Of British Illustration in the London College of Communication (again in 2009) and published in 200 Best Illustrators Worldwide 2007/08 by Lürzer's Archive, Expose 6 - The Finest Digital Art in the Known Universe by Ballistic Publishing in 2008.

In April 2008, at age 29, she was invited to join the Fellowship of the Royal Society of Arts in London. She was also invited to attend the exclusive RSA President's Lecture introduced by HRH Anne, Princess Royal at the RSA House in London in 2012. The RSA in London presented Petra Štefanková's painting in an exhibition at the RSA House in November 2023, and there was also a screening of her short animated film 'Little Pixies and Colours' (original title 'Farebníčkovia a farby') during the "RSA Fellow Artists' Network Film Night". www.thersa.org. Archived from the original on 14 October 2024.

Further involvement with the RSA included a group exhibition Creativity Is A New Formula For Life at the Mayor's Gallery in Las Vegas organised from June to September 2025 by the RSA's Augmented Society Network.

In July 2008, she presented her illustrative work at the ICON5 Illustration Salon in the Roosevelt Hotel off Madison Avenue in New York City. Other public presentations include Les E-Magiciens, the European Digital Animation festival organised by Supinfocom in France in November 2008, discussion at "DOX: Centre for Contemporary Art in Prague". www.czechdesign.cz. and TEDx Bratislava 2013. In 2010, she was the advisor in one-to-one sessions for "Futurising". www.futurising.org. Archived from the original on 17 December 2010., the creative opportunities event led by the London College of Communication on behalf of the University of the Arts London.

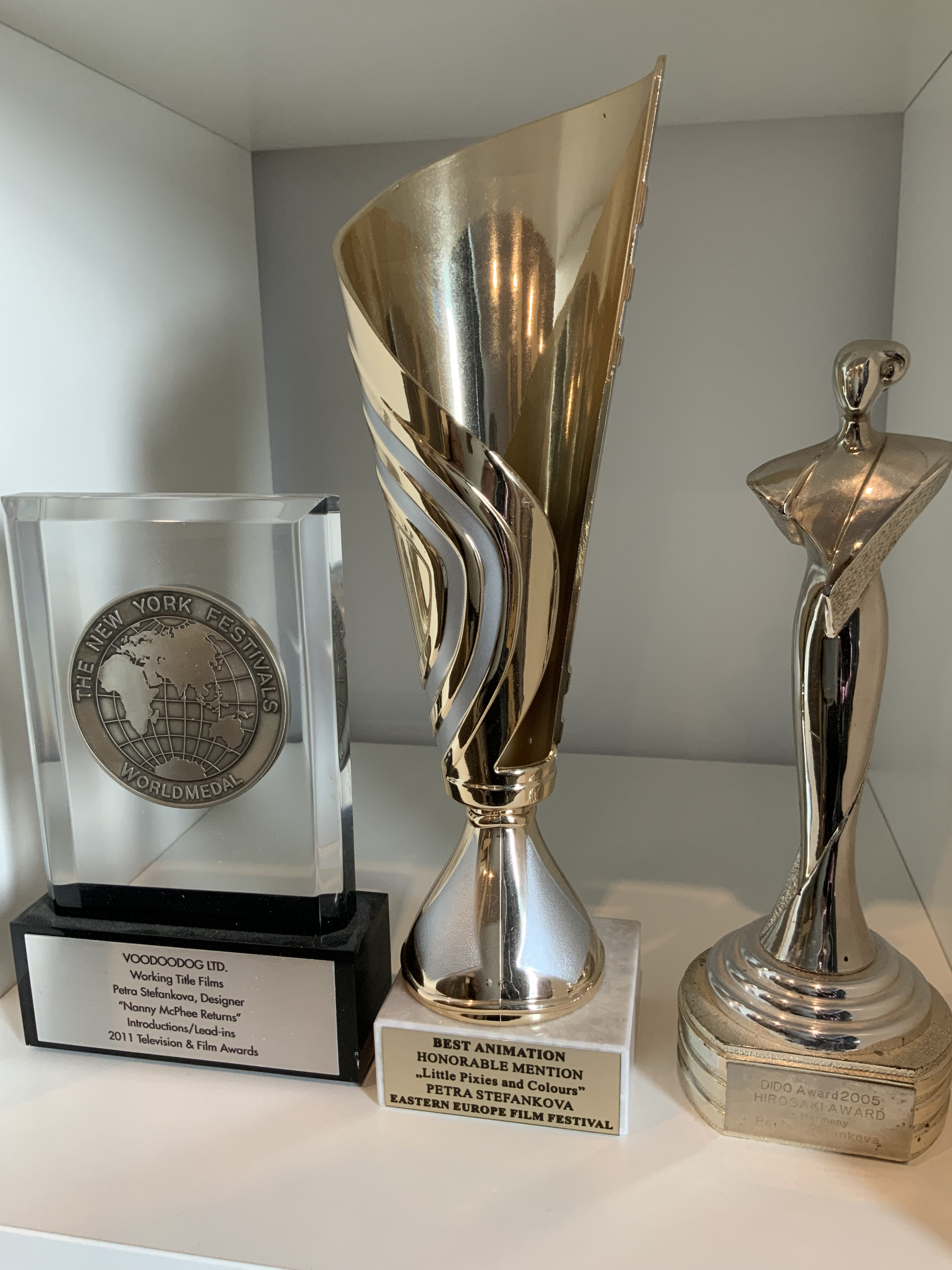
Selection of awards for Petra Stefankova

As a designer, she collaborated on an animated title sequence for the feature film Nanny McPhee and the Big Bang with Voodoodog Animation in London. The team was awarded the Silver World Medal at the New York Festival (World's Best TV and Film Awards) in 2011.

Štefanková's numerous accolades include the American Illustration 42 Winner in New York in 2023 "American Illustration 42 Winners". www.ai-ap.com., The Minister of Culture of the Slovak Republic Award in 2019 "Laureates of the Minister of Culture Award 2019". www.culture.gov.sk. 23 February 2020., The Best Children's Book of Spring 2018 "The Most Beautiful and Best Children's Books of Spring and Summer 2018". www.bibiana.sk. 5 December 2018., Expose 6 Master Award winner in Australia in 2008 "Expose 6 Master Award Winner". www.cgsociety.org. Archived from the original on 3 October 2008., and Excellence Award in Toray Digital Creation Awards 2004 in Japan "Štefanková excelled in a digital art competition in Japan". www.sme.sk.

In 2011, her digital portrait of filmmaker Jonas Mekas was exhibited as part of the BOND magazine Launch event and exhibition at Saatchi Gallery in London. In 2016, she participated in "Prague Design Week". www.praguedesignweek.cz. organised at Kafka's House in the heart of Prague. In 2017, her work was selected for the Biennial of Illustration Bratislava exhibition at the Slovak National Museum.

In August 2024, Petra Štefanková was featured in the opening ceremony video on a large screen at the international conference Wikimania 2024 in Katowice organised by the Wikimedia Foundation.

In 2025, her name and biography were included in the London-based Ben Uri Gallery & Museum Research Database of immigrant contributors to the British visual culture since 1900.

== Publications and projects ==
Štefanková's publications include Drawing Inspiration: Visual Artists at Work by Michael Fleishman, Cengage (2011, US); Vector Graphics and Illustration, A master class in digital image-making by Steven Withrow and Jack Harris, Rotovision (2008, UK); Illustration: A Theoretical and Contextual Perspective by Alan Male, Bloomsbury (2024, UK); Drawn Vol.1 The Best Illustrators Worldwide (2017, Australia), Channel 4's 4Talent magazine, The Economist, The Guardian, Aesthetica, Forbes Slovakia and many more.

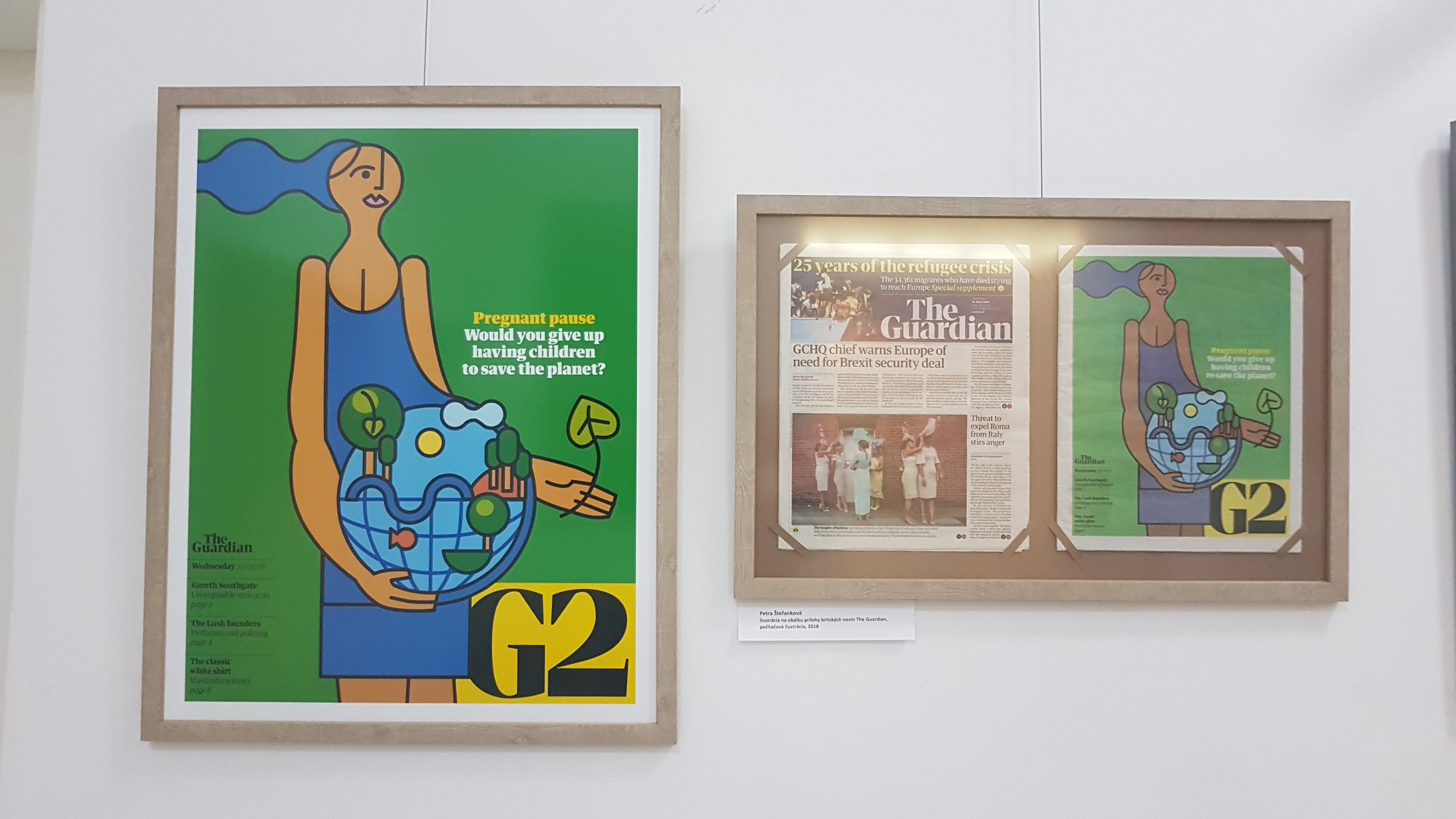
Illustration for the cover of the supplement for the Guardian by Petra Stefankova

On February 25, 2022 Vanity Fair magazine in the United Kingdom published Petra Štefanková's painting in the A-list Artists section as part of their annual Hollywood issue.

Štefanková is an author, designer and illustrator of children's books Moje malé more (2016, Slovakia); and Čmáranica a Machuľa published by Slovart (2018, Slovakia). She has illustrated a children's book of Mária Štefánková My už vieme všeličo published by Slovart (2017, Slovakia). In 2019 her short comic was published in the Frame Prague Comic Art Festival Anthology by Centrala. In 2023, she illustrated the children's publication of Austrian author Hannah Lena Rebel from Vienna, The Fly on the Honey Bread (2023, Germany); also as a German version of Die Fliege auf dem Honigbrot (2023, Germany). In 2024 she collaborated again with Hannah Lena Rebel on Whimsical Wonders: A Toy Store's Timeless Tales, a children's opera, (2024, Germany). Some of the books are available from "The RSA Library Catalogue". in London.

Štefanková is also known for the collaboration with the Californian company Lynda.com, where she created illustrations for their educational "Lynda.com DVD packaging". between the years 2011–2013.

Štefanková is a supporter of many charity projects such as "Parky Life". www.parkylife.com. by the agency Havas Lynx in the UK (2019), "Memories Book". www.memories-book.co.uk. Archived from the original on 15 April 2015. in aid of Maggie's Centres by Garrick Webster (DAHRA, 2011), project Dotyky umenia of the top model Ivana Christová (Orin Panacea, 2013).

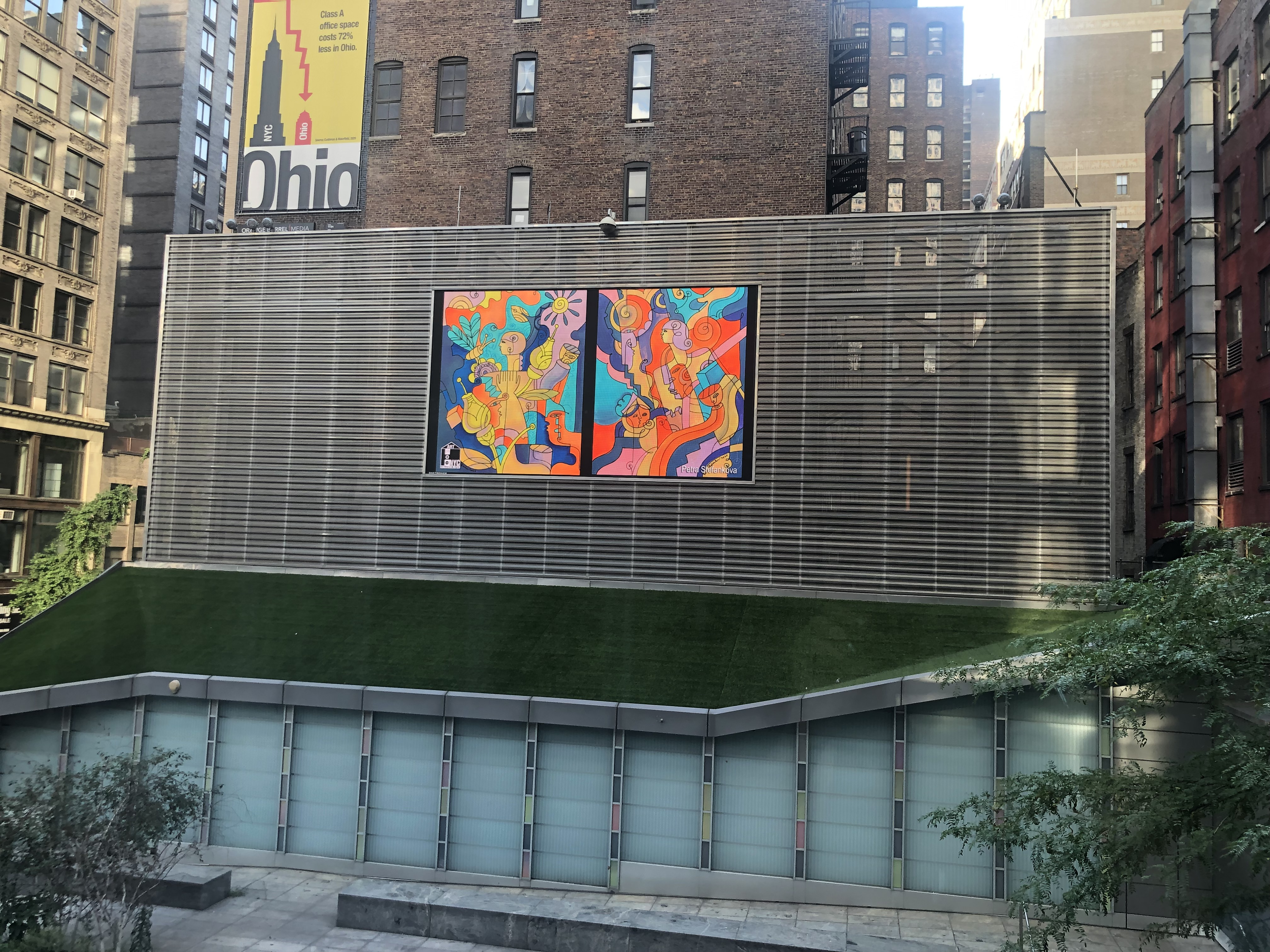
Works by Petra Stefankova on a 30 ft screen at Big Screen Plaza in New York in August 2021

== Style ==
Brathová, Barbara (3 August 2021). "Petra ako skala". www.mojakultura.sk. Moja Kultúra. "Petra Štefanková is a universal artist who, in addition to graphics, illustration and painting, also designs, is the author of texts, films, and books and likes to express herself visually through various materials and objects. She studied graphic design, which is also the reason why she is inclined towards flat aesthetics, and her pictorial scenes are characterized by a simplified form that functions as a sign, a symbol, and an artistic shorthand."

== Television and radio appearances ==
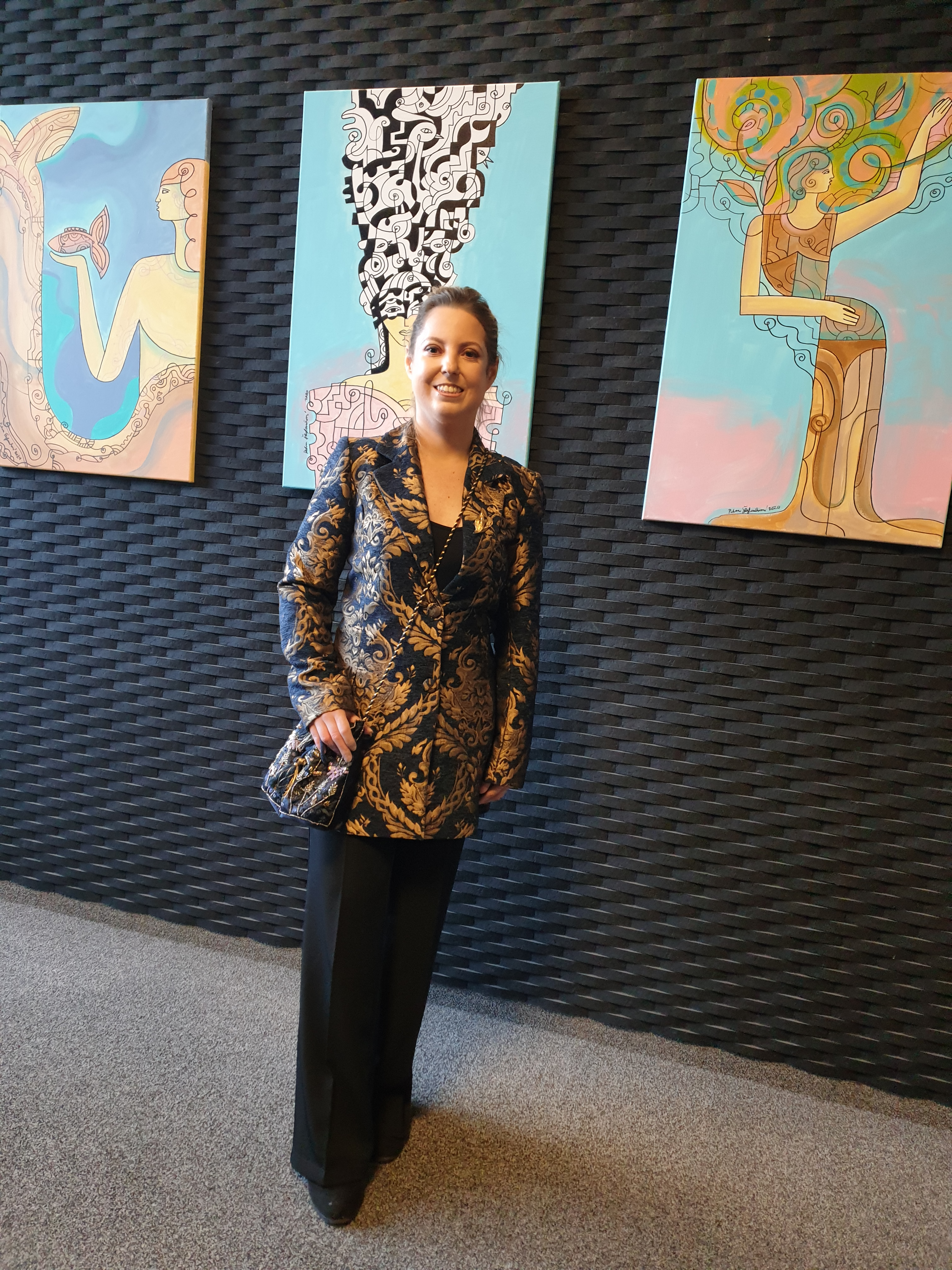
Štefanková during a vernissage of her solo exhibition in Bratislava, 2022

Štefanková starred in several television documentaries and reports. Portrét umelca – Petra Štefanková was filmed for television TV 213 and directed by Anton Faraonov in 2016. In 2010 she was part of a documentary series about Slovaks abroad (Slováci vo svete) directed by Branislav Mišík and the reportage was filmed at the premises of the RSA in London. Two other reportages were filmed for television RTVS as part of the programmes "Slovensko v obrazoch". www.rtvs.sk. (2020) and "Správy RTVS". www.rtvs.sk. (2021). In 2021, there was a reportage about her solo exhibition at Bratislava Castle, filmed for "TA3 Television". www.ta3.com. 18 September 2021.

The radio interviews with Petra Štefanková include "Nočná Pyramída". www.rtvs.sk. on Radio Slovensko in 2023, "Slováci sú Prima". www.funradio.sk. on Fun Rádio in 2022, "Kultúrny denník". devin.rtvs.sk. on Rádio Devín in 2021 and a live radio interview on Nights "Nights". www.rnz.co.nz. for Radio New Zealand in 2010.

== Publicity listings ==
- Gray, Lisa (October 2024). "Petra Štefanková – An Eclectic Visual Language". The Flux Review. No. 11. United Kingdom. p. 136-137. ISSN 2633-643X.
- Navarro, Dafna (October 2024). "The Magical Reality of Petra Štefanková". Art Market Magazine Gold List. No. 8. Israel. p. 47.
- Prokeš, Jakub (October 2024). "Mať talent a úspech nestačí". Forbes. No. 10/2024. Slovakia. p. 273-278. ISSN 1338-2527.
- "Petra Štefanková". Aesthetica. No. 116. United Kingdom. January 2024. p. 142. ISSN 1743-2715.
- "Petra Štefanková". Aesthetica. No. 113. United Kingdom. July 2023. p. 144. ISSN 1743-2715.
- Kovalčíková, Mária (November 9, 2023). "Magické príbehy Petry Štefankovej". Literárny týždenník. No. 25–26. Slovakia. p. 10. ISSN 0862-5999.
- "A-List Artists". Vanity Fair. No. Hollywood Issue. United Kingdom. February 2022. p. 131. ISSN 0961-5520.
- Naščák, Peter (2018). "Literatúra pre deti a mládež v roku 2017". Romboid. No. 5–6. Slovakia. pp. 128–129. ISSN 0231-6714.
- Vavrová, Tatiana (September 2013). "Štyri roky londýnskych lekcií". Forbes. Slovakia. pp. 76–78. ISSN 1338-2527.
- "Petra Štefanková". Artbox Magazine. No. 12. United Kingdom. January 2011. pp. 30–39. ISSN 2042-695X.
- "Artist of the Issue: Petra Stefankova". Cut Out Magazine. No. 1. Malaysia. 2010. p. 63. ISSN 2180-1754.
- "Petra Štefanková". Bond Magazine. No. 1. United Kingdom. Spring 2010. pp. 144–149. ISSN 2042-6488.
- "Petra Štefanková". XFuns Magazine. No. 50. Taiwan. October 2010. pp. 26–31. ISSN 1683-1578.
- Štefanková, Petra (March 2008). "Cubism, surrealism and character creation". Computer Arts. No. 146. United Kingdom. pp. 84–86. ISSN 1360-5372.
- Webster, Garrick (2007). "Petra Štefanková: Illustrator". TEN4 Magazine. No. 8. United Kingdom. pp. 60–61. ISSN 1752-2021.
- "Exposure: Petra Stefankova". Computer Arts. No. 107. United Kingdom. March 2005. p. 9. ISSN 1360-5372.
