= Roland Cziurlock =

German bodybuilder (born 1967)

- Professional bodybuilder

Personal info
- Born: November 30, 1967 (age 58); Opole, Silesia, Poland

Best statistics
- Height: 5 ft 8 in (173 cm)
- Weight: 225

Professional (Pro) career
- Pro-debut: World Amateur Championships; 1991
- Best win: World Amateur Championships - 1st Mr. Olympia - 12th Arnold Classic - 7th Night of Champions - 5th
- Active: to 2001

Roland Cziurlock (born November 30, 1967, in Opole, Silesia, Poland) is a retired German professional bodybuilder. Despite being born in Poland, he competed for Germany. His best performances were in the 1990s and included a twelfth-place finish in Joe Weider's Mr. Olympia competition.

== Contest history ==
- 1991 World Amateur Championships - IFBB, Light-HeavyWeight, 7th
- 1992 World Amateur Championships - IFBB, Light-HeavyWeight, 2nd
- 1993 World Amateur Championships - IFBB, Light-HeavyWeight, 1st
- 1994 Mr. Olympia - IFBB, 18th
- 1995 Night of Champions - IFBB, 5th
- 1996 Arnold Classic - IFBB, 7th
- 1996 Mr. Olympia - IFBB, 12th
- 1998 Arnold Classic - IFBB, 10th
- 2000 Night of Champions - IFBB, 16th
- 2001 Night of Champions - IFBB, did not place
- 2011 Miami Masters World - IFBB, 8th
