= Hüseyin Avni =

Hüseyin Avni may refer to:

== People ==
- Hüseyin Avni Bey (1875–1915), Ottoman military officer
- Hüseyin Avni Mutlu (born 1956), Turkish civil servant
- Hüseyin Avni Pasha (1820–1876), Ottoman statesman and grand vizier
- Hüseyin Avni Zaimler (1887–1930), Ottoman military officer and Turkish politician

== Other uses ==
- Hüseyin Avni Aker Stadium, home of the football club Trabzonspor, named after Hüseyin Avni Aker
