= Veronika Sramaty =

Slovak painter

- Born: Veronika Šramatyová; 1977 (age 48–49); Zvolen, Czechoslovakia
- Known for: Painting
- Website: veronikasramaty.com

Veronika Šramatyová, better known as Veronika Sramaty (born 1977), is a Slovak painter. As an artist she is interested in various media, but mostly she is involved with media of painting related to classic concept of historical painting as well as its influence of neo-conceptual tendencies. She is the author of the artistic project The Top Ten (which include 10 gouache paintings on paper and catalogue).

Šramatyová is an author belonging to the distinctive personalities of the younger generation. The characteristic feature of her work are the neo-conceptual tendencies in painting. She is interested in the connection of the two media, painting and photography, constantly exploring and analysing them. She often thematises the borders between the artist and the gallery or viewer and an artwork. Besides neo-conceptual tendencies, the artist shows a constant interest in the medium of painting, using its photo-realistic language, through which she articulates other meanings and layers, as can be seen in her painting project Entries (AKA Project 19). At the exhibition This is my place (Banská Bystrica, 2003), she presented 19 photo-realistic paintings of the entries or gates to all the houses she has ever lived in. Their small scale, framing and technical presentation create a series of impersonal documentary, non-nostalgic photographs.

== The Top Ten Project ==
Sramaty in her current (2014/2015) painter's cycle (project) The Top Ten focuses on portraiture and self-portraiture with ten great players of the art market according to the magazine Forbes. The author in her thematic series of gouache paintings reacts to the media value of the information the magazine Forbes provided in March 2012 when they published the list of the ten best art dealers in the form of a picture report. Sramaty in her project The Top Ten semantically achieves a visual idiom – using her authorial intervention she created an unreal scenario in the real world, while at the same time the result is not an imagination or a virtual world of gamer´s type. In the series of gauche paintings however, she resigns from pathos of large formats of current art and adheres to the photographic size 3.34 x 4.92 in (8,5 x 12,5 cm). It is very refreshing that her photorealistic painting in the postmedia and postconceptual age once again introduces idea, sketch, counterfeit and manipulated photography to benefit humor. Through this it directly denies the widespread emptiness of meaning in art. At the same time she offers, using her own devices (both painterly and photographic) a dreamy, but also realistic, manipulated view of an artist from Europe, establishing herself in the fast changing rules of the American art market. Veronika Sramaty presents herself in the gauche paintings as a friend of the individual people involved in beneficent brunches, exhibit openings, afterparties, and staged formal photographs of gallerists – simply in spaces where the art is not created but rather distributed.

== Studies ==
In 1996–2003, she studied at the Academy of Fine Arts and Design in Bratislava, Department of Painting and Other Media. In 2005–2010, she attended the postgraduate study (degree ArtD.) at the Academy of Fine Arts and Design in Bratislava.

== Solo exhibitions ==
- 2016 Periférne centrá Dúbravica, Projekt Jednota No.3., Dúbravica, Slovakia
- 2016 Attributes of Metaphors and Intuition of Mind Galéria 19, Bratislava, Slovakia
- 2015 The Top Ten, Soda Gallery, Bratislava, Slovakia
- 2014 Landscape, Flatgallery, Bratislava, Slovakia
- 2013 About the Importance of Forgetfulness, The ArtWall Project Space, Athens, Greece
- 2010 Hard Work/Clean Work, Central Slovak Gallery, Banská Bystrica, Slovakia
- 2010 Barter Collection, Soda Gallery, Bratislava, Slovakia
- 2008 Hobby Painting, Room 19_21 Central Slovak Gallery, Banská Bystrica, Slovakia
- 2007 Jungen Slovakinnen (with M. Nociarová-Rázusová and R. Prokop), Greilleinstein, Austria
- 2004 Come and Win!, HIT Gallery, Bratislava, Slovakia
- 2003 Medium (with B. Balážová, J. Triaška), Medium Gallery, Bratislava, Slovakia
- 2001 Artoday (with A. Mona Chisa), Buryzone, Bratislava, Slovakia

== Group exhibitions ==
- 2019 Statek Robinsona, Muzeum Architektury, Wrocław, Poland
- 2018 Total Romantic, Contemporary Imagery in the World of Women Painters, Jan Koniarek Gallery in Trnava, Trnava, Slovakia
- 2017 Wratislavia Pro Bratislava / Bratislava Pro Wratislavia, Galeria Miejska, Wrocław, Poland
- 2016 Landscapes, Bartók Gallery, Budapest, Hungary
- 2015 Export, Krokus Contemporary Art Gallery, Bratislava, Slovakia
- 2015 A Touch of California, Nástupište 1-12, Topoľčany, Slovakia
- 2015 Art has no Alternative, Tranzit Gallery, Bratislava, Slovakia
- 2014 I Came, I Saw, ..., Apricity Gallery, Santa Cruz, California, United States
- 2014 7th New Zlín Salon, Regional Gallery of Fine Arts in Zlín, Czech Republic
- 2013 Home Sweet Home, Soda Gallery, Bratislava, Slovakia
- 2013 Zero Years – Nullerjahre, Freies Museum, Berlin, Germany
- 2013 Auf Der Strecke, Stadtgalerie Bern, Bern, Switzerland
- 2013 First Exhibition, Kunsthalle Lab, Bratislava, Slovakia
- 2013 ArtD.No1, Art House, Bratislava, Slovakia
- 2013 Suspicious Free Time, Open Gallery, Bratislava, Slovakia
- 2012 Delete. Art and Wiping Out, Slovak National Gallery, Slovakia
- 2011 Zero Years, Slovak art 1999–2011, Art House, Bratislava, Slovakia
- 2011 Painting 2011, Ministry of Culture, Bratislava, Slovakia
- 2011 Manual for the perfect Viewer, Nitra Gallery, Nitra, Slovakia
- 2010 Painting After Painting, Slovak National Gallery, Bratislava, Slovakia
- 2009 Traps Of Visual Illusion – Contemporary Forms Of Trompe'l Oeil, Nitra Gallery, Nitra, Slovakia
- 2009 Perfect Asymmetry II., Donumenta, Städtische Galerie "Leerer Beutel", Regensburg, Germany
- 2009 Plus Minus XXI, Art House, Bratislava, Slovakia
- 2009 Contact, City Hall Gallery, Oslo, Norway
- 2008 Slovak Picture [Anti-Picture], Riding school, Prague Castle, Czech Republic
- 2008 Case History, Central Slovakian Gallery, Banská Bystrica, Slovakia
- 2008 Close Encounters, Soho in Ottakring, Wien, Austria
- 2008 Essl Award 2007, Kunstforum Ostdeutsche Galerie, Regensburg, Germany
- 2007 Essl Award 2007, Essl Museum, Klosterneuburg - Wien, Austria
- 2006 Transfer, Museum of Contemporary Art in Vojvodina, Novi Sad, Serbia
- 2006 Runaway, SPACE / Gallery Priestor for Contemporary Arts, Bratislava, Slovakia
- 2006 22 Minutes 50,28 Seconds, University Library, Jyväskylä, Finland
- 2006 22 Minutes 50,28 Seconds, CAISA Center, Helsinki, Finland
- 2005 Draught in contemporary Slovak painting 2000–2005, City Gallery Prague, Czech Republic
- 2005 White Greetings for Belarus, National Art Museum of The Belarus, Minsk, Belarus
- 2005 Prague Biennale 2 (New Slovak Scene), Karlín Hall, Prague, Czech Republic
- 2004 Re:Location Academy/Shake Society, Casino Luxembourg – Forum d´art Contemporain, Luxembourg
- 2004 Mak Nite. Europa Jetzt, Action with HIT Gallery, MAK in Vienna, Austria
- 2004 Media Factory, Zsolnay Factory, Pécz, Hungary
- 2003 This is My Place (1), Central Slovakian Gallery, Banská Bystrica, Slovakia
- 2003 Czechoslovakia, Slovak National Museum, Bratislava, Slovakia
- 2002 TRANZart disLOCATED, Mediawave Foundation, Győr (Hungary), At Home Gallery Foundation, Šamorín (Slovakia), Maszk Association, Szeged (Hungary), Kibla Multimedia Centre, Maribor (Slovenia), Tranzit Foundation, Cluj (Romania)
- 2002 Slovak Contemporary Art - Space Gallery, Artforum Berlin, Germany

== Publishing Art Projects ==
- 2014 The Top Ten, Catalogue, self-published, Slovakia
- 2010 Veronika Šramatyová, Catalogue, self-published, Slovakia
- 2009 Untitled, Book of Poetry. Publisher: Ars Poetica, Slovakia
- 2003 Come and Win! Catalogue, self-published, Slovakia

== Collections ==
- Residency.ch, Progr Zentrum Fur Kulturproduction, Bern, Switzerland
- Slovak National Gallery, Bratislava, Slovakia
- Central Slovakian Gallery, Banská Bystrica, Slovakia
- Nitra Gallery, Nitra, Slovakia
- Museum of Contemporary Arts, Novi Sad, Serbia
- Private Collections USA, Europe
