= Tina Schüßler =

German boxer, kickboxer and bodybuilder

Tina Schüssler
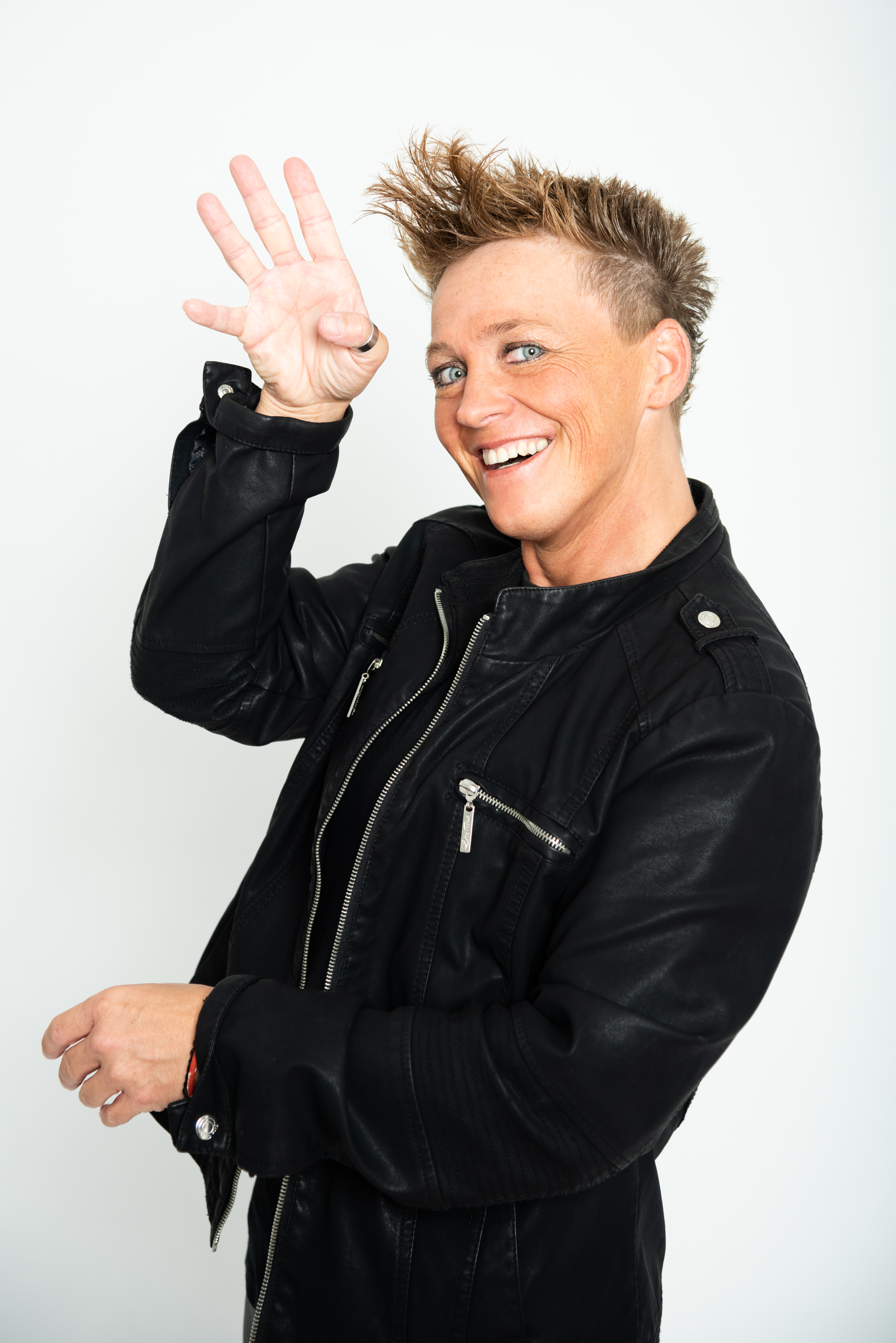
- Tina Schüßler
- Born: 21 June 1974 (age 52); Augsburg, West Germany

Tina Schüßler (also Tina Schüssler) (born 21 June 1974 in Augsburg) is a German singer, kickboxer, boxer, bodybuilder and former world champion.

== Biography ==
Schüssler grew up in Stadtbergen and Diedorf. For boxing, she came full-contact at the age of 18 with her career as a kickboxer.

In 1997 she won the highest title of the Women's International Boxing Federation (WIBF) -54,4 kg, which enabled her to enter the professional boxing business. She got the license of the BDB (Bund Deutscher Berufsboxer) and started her first professional bout for the Hamburg-based Universum Box-Promotion. In 1998 she managed to get into the German national team of Kickboxer WKA (World Kickboxing Association). In the same year, she became world champion and opened her third own sports center called Sporttreff (combat and fitness school) in Diedorf.

In 2002, she founded her own boxing club named Boxsportclub BSC Bayern 02. In the spring of 2005 she took the first step towards the bodybuilding stage in female class I up to 52 kg. In the autumn of 2005, she became International German Champion (IFBB). From this time, she sponsored the six-time Mr. Olympia Dorian Yates and CNP Professional England. In 2006 she was a stage guest together with Ronnie Coleman at the FIBO in Essen.

In 2009 Schüssler suffered a stroke due to a congenital heart defect, was paralyzed on the left side and had to undergo cardiac surgery in 2010. After two and a half years she appeared again for the first time and was invited by Sat.1 to shoot for the show "Mein Mann kann" with Britt Hagedorn.

Since her illness, Schüssler is the ambassador of the German bone marrow donor database (DKMS), the Bavarian Cancer Society, the mother-child center Augsburg "Mukis", the Buntenkreis Augsburg, the Tour-Ginkgo 2014 and also the Kinderhilfsorganisationstunde der Herzens together with Jumbo Schreiner on road. Since 2016, Tina Patin has been a member of the Bayerisches Kinderklinik Kinderklinik at the Augsburg Clinic and the advertising agency of the Bavarian Red Cross.

In 2012 she was again active as a boxer and climbed into the ring for the first time since her illness on June 16 at the Sporthalle in Augsburg. After her victory, she won several boxing matches. On June 8, 2013, she won the world title in the Sporthalle Augsburg and has been World Champion of the WBF in professional boxing up to 62.4 kg.

In 2013, Schüssler joined the office as Bundestrainerin of the ISKA. At the Brechtfestival 2014 in Augsburg, Schüssler appeared together with actors Iris Berben, Katharina Thalbach and Thomas Thieme and played together the play Das Chaos ist aufgeraucht !. In March 2014, she ran as a partisan for the mayor of Diedorf.

Schüssler qualified again in 2016 for the national team and is ranked 4th in the WKU rank list in the K-1 (2017). She fought for the World Championship title in the K-1 to 57 kg in the USA (Orlando, Florida) at the end of September.

She has recorded a music CD and DVD "My Fight" and "Glorious Times" on the market. Her songs refer to her illness and fight back into life.

== Personal life ==
Schüssler lives with her life partner Clemens Brocker from Neusäß near Augsburg. She has a son.

== Titles ==
- World champion: 2016 K-1
- World champion: 2013 boxing
- World champion: 1998 kickboxing
- European champion: 2003 kickboxing
- German champion: 1998 kickboxing, 2005 bodybuilding
- German champion: 1996, 1997 kickboxing
- European champion Vize: 1997 kickboxing
- Internationale Deutsche Meisterin Vize: 2003 kickboxing, 2005 bodybuilding
- Shootingstar: 1997 boxing
