= Jana Linke-Sippl =

German bodybuilder and wrestler

- Professional bodybuilder

Personal info
- Born: March 16, 1968 (age 57); Neustadt an der Orla

Best statistics
- Height: 171 cm (5 ft 7 1/2 in)
- Weight: (In Season) 178 lb (81 kg) (Off-Season) 200 lb (91 kg)

Jana Linke-Sippl (born March 16, 1968) is a FBB female bodybuilder from Germany and a session mixed wrestler. Originally from Germany, Linke-Sippl lives in Hungary. She has been interviewed and has frequently appeared on European TV Channels such as RTL.

== Personal life ==
Linke-Sippl was born in Neustadt an der Orla, a little town in Thuringia, East Germany. She gained her interest in bodybuilding after she moved to West Germany. After just 16 months of training, Linke-Sippl took part in the 1991 IFFB competition. Linke-Sippl had breast surgery in December 2008.

== Contest history ==
- 2005 International Austria Cup - 1st
- Master's World Championship (Budapest)
- Europa Pro Show 5th place (2007)
- Upper Bavarian/Swabian championship 1st place (2003)
