= Kerstin Wöller =

German bodybuilder

Kerstin Wöller (born c. 1967) is a German bodybuilding champion.

Employed as a teacher of French and English, Wöller came to her hobby by accident in 1991. She became German champion in her weight class in her first championship, in 2005. Her husband, André Klatt, is also a bodybuilder and is the North German champion. Wöller lives in Kakenstorf near Hamburg.
