= Jana Farmanová =

Slovak contemporary figurative painter

Jana Farmanová (born 1970) is a Slovak contemporary figurative painter who has been called one of the most influential painters of contemporary Slovak and Czech art scene.

Farmanová has been active in the visual arts since the late 1990s, after studying at Academy of Fine Arts and Design in Bratislava, Slovakia.

Her work has been displayed at the Bratislava City Gallery in Bratislava, Nitra Gallery in Nitra, Slovakia, Wannieck Gallery of Modern Art in Brno, Czech Republic, Olomouc Museum of Art in Olomouc, Czech Republic, and the Sammlung Würth collection in Germany. In 2012 Slovart publishing house and Krokus Gallery published the monograph of Farmanová's artwork, with text by Czech art-historian Petr Vaňous, author Eva Borušovičová and poet Mila Haugová.

== Solo exhibitions ==
- 2018-2019 Jana Farmanová – What Remains?, Alšova Jihočeská galerie, Castle Riding School, Hluboká nad Vltavou, Czech Republic
- 2018 Jana Farmanová (with Petra Ondreičková Nováková)| Here Means Now, Embassy of Slovak Republic in Washington, US
- 2018 Jana Farmanová - We Are Family, Galerie Vyšehrad, Prague, Czech Republic
- 2018 Jana Farmanová - In My Gardens, Banská Bystrica, Slovak Republic
- 2016 Jana Farmanová – Essences, Galéria Jozefa Kollára, Banská Štiavnica, Slovak Republic
- 2016 Jana Farmanová - I Plant Seeds of Sun-flower and Looking for Sun Over Clouds, Šamorín, Slovakia
- 2015 Jana Farmanová. SO Vulnerable, So Strong. With guest: Pavlína Fichta Čierna, Krokus Galeria, Bratislava, Slovak Republic
- 2015 Jana Farmanová – Under the Sign of Virgo, Bratislava City Gallery, Bratislava, Slovak Republic
- 2014 Attention Fragile, Gallery Kubik, Porto, Portugal
- 2013 Jana Farmanová, (with Juliana Mrvová), Herbarium of the Time, Industrial Gallery, Ostrava, Czech Republic
- 2013 Something Substantial, Sypka Gallery, Valašské Meziříčí, Czech Republic
- 2012 Conversion, Krokus Gallery, Bratislava, Slovak Republic
- 2012 Self-Confidence, The East Slovak Gallery, Košice, Slovak Republic
- 2012 Weightlessness, Vernon Gallery, Prague, Czech Republic
- 2011 On the Rail, Stanica, Žilina-Zárečie, Slovak Republic
- 2011 Welcome to Yourself, Kubik Gallery, Porto, Portugal
- 2010 Focus, City Gallery, Rimavská Sobota, Slovak Republic
- 2009 Histoire. Life with(out) a Good Communist, Krokus Gallery, Bratislava, Slovak Republic
- 2009 Soundtrack, Vernon Gallery, Prague, Czech Republic
- 2009 Dolls, The Old Theatre, Nitra, Slovak Republic
- 2008 Cooking Jam, Bastart Contemporary, Bratislava, Slovak Republic
- 2008 Elements and Miracles, Slovak Institute, Rome, Italy
- 2008 Ici e mantenant, Slovak Institut, Paris, France
- 2008 Jana Farmanová (with Martin Piaček): Melancholia, Fiducia Gallery, Ostrava, Czech Republic
- 2008 Not Only Media Faces, Linea Gallery, Bratislava, Slovak Republic
- 2006 Jana Farmanová, Nitra Gallery, Slovak Republic
- 2006 Women's Toys, Bonjour, Bratislava, Slovak Republic
- 2005 Women's Toys, Ad Astra Gallery, Brno, Czech Republic
- 2005 Ofélia & Diana, At Home Gallery, Šamorín, 2006, Slovak Republic
- 2004 Barefoot, Sla-Sla Gallery, Munich, Germany
- 2004 Barefoot, CC-Centrum, Bratislava, Slovak Republic
- 2004 Aut Bene Aut Nihil, Slovak Institute, Budapest, Hungary
- 2003 JF, Youth Gallery in Nitra Gallery, Nitra, Slovak Republic
- 2003 The Colour Run Out, Orava Gallery, Dolný Kubín, Slovak Republic
- 2003 Privacy, Gallery Subterra, Nitra, Slovak Republic
- 1995 Entrance, City Gallery, Nitra, Slovak Republic

== Group exhibitions ==
- 2018-2019 Plus Minus - Contemporary Slovak Art from the Collection of Bratislava City Gallery, Oblastní galerie Liberec, Czech Republic
- 2018 Total Romantic. Contemporary Imagery in the World of Women Painters, Jan Koniarek Gallery in Trnava, Trnava, Slovak Republic
- 2018 More Than 30 ..., Zoya Museum, Modra, Republic
- 2017 The Joy of Blood Bond, (Jana Farmanová, Monika Kubinská & Erna Masarovičová), Medium Gallery Bratislava, Slovak Republic
- 2014 The Boundaries of Children's Soul, Turiec Gallery, Martin, Slovak Republic
- 2013 Film. Directed by Artist 2., Nitra Gallery, Slovak Republic
- 2013 La Petite Piece de Barbe Bleue, Musée L'Atelier Gaston de Luppé, Arles, France
- 2013 Berührend, Kro Art Contemporary, Vienna, Austria
- 2012 Where is the way out?, Nitra Gallery, Nitra, Slovak Republic
- 2011 Love in Time of Youth, Love in Time of Crisis, The East Slovak Gallery, Košice, Slovak Republic
- 2011 ObraSKov, Wannieck Gallery, Brno, Czech Republic
- 2011 Miracles – Wunderkammer, Kro Art Gallery, Vienna, Austria
- 2010 Inter-view, Nitra Gallery, Nitra, Slovak Republic
- 2010 Painting Studio – Koceľová 23 Street, The House of Art, Bratislava, Slovak Republic
- 2009 8 Women, Slovak Union of Visual Arts, Bratislava, Slovak Republic
- 2009 Contact, City Hall Gallery, Oslo, Norway
- 2009 Tolerance in Art, Danubiana Meulensteen Art Museum, Bratislava, Slovak Republic
- 2009 3rd Chapter of Slovak Contemporary Art, The Gallery of Art Critics, Prague, Czech Republic
- 2008 Body and Oil, The House of Art, Bratislava, Slovak Republic
- 2008 The New Zlin Salon, Zlín, Czech Republic
- 2008 The Big Wash, Galerie Caesar, Olomouc, Czech Republic
- 2008 MB, MN, JF, RP, JK, TD, Slovak Institute, Prague, Czech Republic
- 2008 Introcity, The Topič Salon Association Gallery, Prague, Czech Republic
- 2007 Slovak Contemporary Art, Cobalt International Gallery, Brussels, Belgium
- 2007 Mirror as a Tool of Illusion, Nitra Gallery, Nitra, Slovak Republic
- 2007 Painting Biennal, City Gallery, Rimavská Sobota, Slovak Republic
- 2007 Resseting, Prague City Gallery, Prague, Czech Republic
- 2006 Draught, The Central Slovakian Gallery, Banská Bystrica, Slovak Republic
- 2006 Draught, National Gallery in Prague, Praha, Czech Republic
- 2006 The calm, Nitra Gallery, Nitra, Slovak Republic
- 2005 Draught, Museum of Art Žilina, Žilina, Slovak Republic
- 2004 This Is My Place, Synagogue – Contemporary Art Centre/Jan Koniarek Gallery, Trnava, Slovak Gallery
- 2003 This Is My Place, State Gallery, Banská Bystrica, Slovak Gallery
- 2002 Madona v slovenskom výtvarnom umení | Madona In the Slovak Art, Nitra Gallery, Nitra, Slovak Gallery
- 2001 Pars pro toto, Exhibition Space of Town Hall, České Budějovice, Czech Republic
- 2000 Body, DIVYD Gallery, Bratislava, Slovak Republic
- 2000 Space, Gallery BRIK, Praha, Slovak Gallery
- 1997 Ecce Hommo, Nitra Gallery, Nitra, Slovak Republic
- 1994 Slovak Contemporary Art, The Czech Centre, Berlin, Germany
- 1994 Young art, Slovak Embassy, London, UK / GB
- 1994 Drawings, Tennessee, US

== Fiction and poetry book illustration ==
- Denisa Fulmeková: Materská (Maternity Leave), vyd. Ikar, Bratislava, 2012
- Denisa Fulmeková: Topánky z papiera (Shoes of Paper), Ikar, Bratislava, 2009
- Carol Ann Duffy: Nesvätá žena. Výber z poézie (UnSaint Woman- Poetry Selection), Literárna nadácia STUDŇA, 2006. ISBN 80-89207-04-9

== Bibliography ==
- Moncoľová I.: The Joy of Blood Bond, Vydavateľstvo Tympanon & Moncolova Artadvisor, Bratislava, 2017 ISBN 978-80-969385-9-9
- Moncoľová I.: Jana Farmanová – V znamení panny, Artforum, Bratislava, 2015, ISBN 978-80-8150-099-2
- Majdáková D and kol.: Päťdesiat súčasných umelcov na Slovensku, Art Academy/ Slovart, Bratislava, 2014, p. 52 - 55
- Slaninová K.: Emóciami nabitá maľba Jany Farmanovej, Glosália 3/2014, n.g.o. Glosália, Bratislava, 2014, p. 1
- Kisová G., Moncoľová I. (ed.): Jana Farmanová, Krokus Galéria, Slovart, 2012, ISBN 978-80-970810-1-0
- Geržová B.: Gender Aspects of Contemporary Artistic Discourse, Almanac of Interdisciplinary, Slovart/ Academy of Fine Art and Design in Bratislava, Bratislava, 2012
- Vaňous P.: Kudy vede cesta ven? Farmanová, Krivošíková, Polifková, exhibition catalogue, Nitra Gallery, Nitra, 2012
- Moncoľová I.: Jana Farmanová, Váha beztíže, Galerie Vernon, Prague, 2012
- Kisová G.: Jana Farmanová: Fascinuje ma vizualizácia príbehu, rozhovor s Gabrielou Kisovou. In.: Art Banking Bulletin 3/2011
- Moncoľová I.: Situácie, príbehy a silné inšpirácie. Portrét Jany Farmanovej. In.: Profil Contemporary Art Review 2010/3, Bratislava, 2010
- Geržová B.: Histoire, Flash Art CZ/SK, October - December, Prague, 2009
- Rusinová Z.: Autoportrét v slovenskom výtvarnom umení 20. storočia, Veda, Bratislava, 2009
- Michalovič P.: Jana Farmanová. In.: Anthropos 13/2007, Bratislava, 2007
- Jablonská B.: Jana Farmanová, Nielen mediafaces, Galéria Linea, Bratislava, 2007
- Vaňous P.: Jak zformulovat vlastní skušenost?, Revue Art III/2006, Prague, 2006
- Jablonská B., Vaňous P.: Jana Farmanová, Nitrianska Galéria, Nitra, 2006

== References daily press ==
- Znaková reč maliarky Jany Farmanovej
- Finom érintések
- Ako dospievajú dievčatá? Tieto maľby vám to ukážu najkrajšie
- Chlapčenstvo je v kinách, dievčenstvo vládne v galérii
- Je čoraz bližšie k cudzincom
- Chyť ma za ruku, tu a teraz
- Jana Farmanová: Maľujem si v hlave
- Láska v čase krízy
- Vychádza V znamení panny Jany Farmanovej
- Bytie rozšírené o farbu a tvar
