= Sarah Avni =

Slovak artist

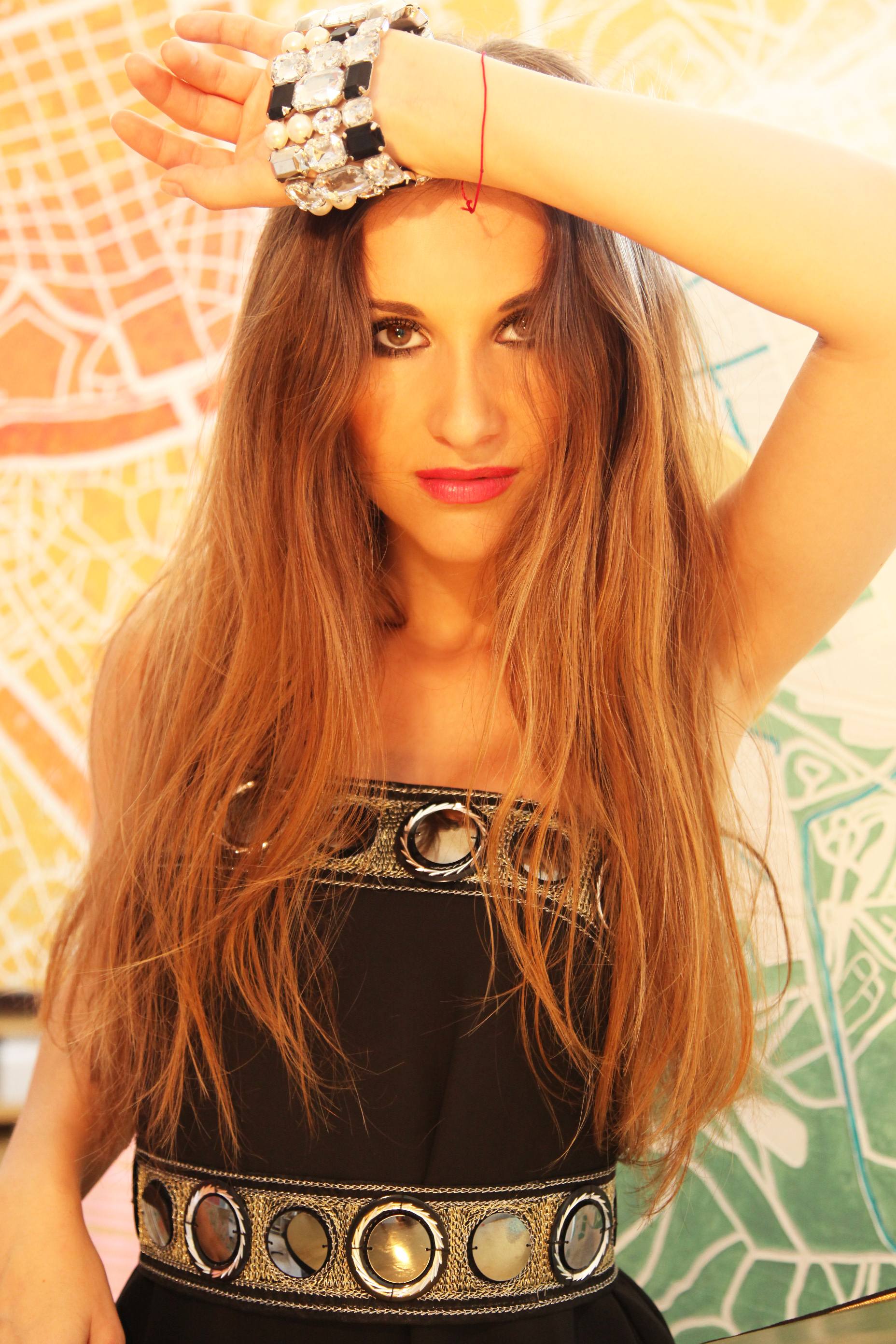
Sarah I. Avni.jpg

Sarah I. Avni is a Slovak artist, based in Prague. She is involved in artistic photography and interior design in addition to painting.

== Career and education ==
Sarah Avni received her artistic education at Graphic Art School in Jihlava in the Czech Republic where she studied drawing and painting. She traveled through Europe, where she collected inspiration that has since made its way into her artistic work. She returned to Slovakia in 2006 and began to concentrate on painting and photography.

Given her positive relationship to travel and the fact that foreign peoples and cultures are an important part of her life and art work, she emphasized these bonds by continuing her education at the University of Central Europe from which she graduated in 2009 with a degree in International relations and diplomacy.

== Artistic composition ==
Among other works she is also the author of a Slovak postage stamp to commemorate the World Cup in South Africa which was recognized with a 1st place award in the international STAMP magazine. She was involved in the interior design process for the Holiday Inn hotel in Trnava and completed a series of paintings for the car company Kia.

== Exhibitions ==
=== 2011 ===
- Galerie Harfa, Prague 2011
- Hotel Holiday Inn, Trnava, Slovakia 2011
- SPP Gallery, Bratislava 2011

=== 2012 ===
- Presidential Palace, Bratislava 2012
- BMW (Tempus Bavaria), Bratislava 2012
- Royal Caffe, Prague 2012
- Iscare, Prague 2012

=== 2013 ===
- Chateau d'Ax, Bratislava 2013
- Olympic Casino Eurovea, Bratislava 2013
- Sushi Roof Eurovea, Bratislava 2013

=== 2015 ===
- Basel Art Center (Gift 4 You), Switzerland 2015
- Basel Art Center (Osteropäische abstrakte Kunst), Switzerland 2015
- Esterhazy Palace (Gallery Merikon Art Room), Vienna 2015

=== 2016 ===
- Exhibition at the Slovak Presidency of the EU Council, Brussels 2016
- Fashion Club, Prague 2016
- Garden Agape, Bratislava 2016
- Chateau Rothschild, Austria 2016

=== 2017 ===
- Slovak Institute, Vienna 2017
- The House of Arts, Piešťany, Slovakia 2017
- Embassy of the Slovak Republic, Ottawa 2017
- Crowne Plaza, Manhattan, New York 2017
- Bratislava Castle, Slovakia 2017
- Chateau Mcely, Czech Republic 2017

=== 2018 ===
- Slovak Institut, Berlin 2018
- Tatra Museum, Poprad, Slovakia 2018
- Rivington Street Gallery, New York 2018
- Slovak Embassy, Washington DC 2018
- Ottawa City Hall, Ottawa 2018
- Festival Re:publika dedicated to the 100th anniversary of the Czechoslovakia, Czech Republic 2018
- Kulturpark, Košice, Slovakia 2018
- Slovak Institute, Prague 2018
- Olympic Games, South Korea 2018

=== 2019 ===
- Ella Design, Vevey, Switzerland 2019
- Hotel Carlo IV., Prague 2019
- Hotel Vienna House Andel´s, Prague 2019
- SC Central, Bratislava, Slovakia 2019
- Clarissine Church, Bratislava, Slovakia 2019
- Slovak Institut, Moscow 2019
- Gallery Vazka,, Trencin, Slovakia 2019
- MaxMara, Bratislava 2019
