= Jana Jurečková =

Czech statistician (born 1940)

- Born: Jana Přistoupilová; 20 September 1940 (age 85); Prague
- Education: Charles University; Czechoslovak Academy of Sciences
- Occupation: Statistician

Jana Jurečková (née Přistoupilová, born 20 September 1940) is a Czech statistician, known for her work on rankings, robust statistics, outliers and tails, asymptotic theory, and the behavior of statistical estimates for finite sample sizes.

== Education and career ==
Jurečková was born in Prague and grew up in Roudnice nad Labem. She earned a master's degree from Charles University, and completed her Ph.D. in 1967 from the Czechoslovak Academy of Sciences under the supervision of Jaroslav Hájek. She completed a habilitation in 1982 and a Dr.Sc. in 1984. She joined Charles University in 1964, becoming part of the Department of Probability and Mathematical Statistics in the Faculty of Mathematics and Physics, and has also been associated with the Jaroslav Hájek Center for Theoretical and Applied Statistics at Masaryk University.

== Books ==
She is the author of Robust Statistical Procedures: Asymptotics and Interrelations (with Pranab K. Sen, Wiley, 1996), of Adaptive Regression (with Yadolah Dodge, Springer, 2000), of Robust Statistical Methods with R (with Jan Picek, Chapman & Hall/CRC, 2005), and of a textbook on robust statistics in Czech.

== Recognition ==
She is a Fellow of the Institute of Mathematical Statistics an elected member of the International Statistical Institute, and since 2003 a member of the Learned Society of the Czech Republic.
