= List of members of the European Parliament for Slovakia, 2004–2009 =

Members of the European Parliament for Slovakia
Observers	(2003)
Delegation	(2004)
6th term	(2004)
7th term	(2009)
8th term	(2014)
9th term	(2019)
10th term	(2024)

This is a list of the 14 members of the European Parliament for Slovakia in the 2004 to 2009 session.

== List ==
Name	National party	EP group	Votes
Peter Baco	People's Party–Movement for a Democratic Slovakia	NI	7,813
Edit Bauer	Party of the Hungarian Coalition	EPP–ED	35,892
Irena Belohorská	People's Party–Movement for a Democratic Slovakia	NI	9,738
Monika Beňová	Direction–Social Democracy	PES	64,250
Árpád Duka-Zólyomi	Party of the Hungarian Coalition	EPP–ED	12,743
Milan Gaľa	Democratic and Christian Union–Democratic Party	EPP–ED	2,466
Ján Hudacký	Christian Democratic Movement	EPP–ED	10,363
Miloš Koterec	Direction–Social Democracy	PES	879
Sergej Kozlík	People's Party–Movement for a Democratic Slovakia	NI	74,938
Vladimír Maňka	Direction–Social Democracy	PES	8,376
Miroslav Mikolášik	Christian Democratic Movement	EPP–ED	21,052
Zita Pleštinská	Democratic and Christian Union–Democratic Party	EPP–ED	1,521
Peter Šťastný	Democratic and Christian Union–Democratic Party	EPP–ED	74,447
Anna Záborská	Christian Democratic Movement	EPP–ED	25,936

=== Party representation ===
National party	EP Group	Seats	±
Democratic and Christian Union–Democratic Party	EPP–ED	3 / 14	
People's Party–Movement for a Democratic Slovakia	NI	3 / 14	
Direction–Social Democracy	PES	3 / 14	
Christian Democratic Movement	EPP–ED	3 / 14	
Party of the Hungarian Coalition	EPP–ED	2 / 14	
