= Slovakia (European Parliament constituency) =

Constituency of the European Parliament

- European Parliament constituency
- Location among the current constituencies
- Member state: Slovakia
- Created: 2004
- MEPs: 14 (2004–2009); 13 (2009–2020); 14 (2020–2024); 15 (2024–present)

Slovakia is a European Parliament constituency for elections to the European Parliament covering the member state of the European Union Slovakia. It is currently represented by fifteen Members of the European Parliament.

== Members of the European Parliament ==
Election	MEP (party)	MEP (party)	MEP (party)	MEP (party)	MEP (party)	MEP (party)	MEP (party)	MEP (party)	MEP (party)	MEP (party)	MEP (party)	MEP (party)	MEP (party)	MEP (party)	MEP (party)
2004	Monika Beňová (Smer)	Miloš Koterec (Smer)	Vladimír Maňka (Smer)	Miroslav Mikolášik (KDH)	Anna Záborská (KDH)	Ján Hudacký (KDH)	Peter Šťastný (SDKU)	Zita Pleštinská (SDKU)	Milan Gaľa (SDKU)	Árpád Duka-Zólyomi (MK)	Edit Bauer (MK)	Sergej Kozlík (HZDS)	Irena Belohorská (HZDS)	Peter Baco (HZDS)	14 seats
2009	Monika Beňová (Smer)	Katarína Neveďalová (Smer)	Vladimír Maňka (Smer)	Miroslav Mikolášik (KDH)	Anna Záborská (KDH)	Monika Smolková (Smer)	Peter Šťastný (SDKU)	Zita Pleštinská (SDKU)	Boris Zala (Smer)	Alajos Mészáros (MK)	Edit Bauer (MK)	Sergej Kozlík (HZDS)	Jaroslav Paška (SNS)	13 seats	
2014	Monika Beňová (Smer)	Ivan Štefanec (KDH)	Vladimír Maňka (Smer)	Miroslav Mikolášik (KDH)	Anna Záborská (KDH)	Monika Smolková (Smer)	Eduard Kukan (SDKU)	Branislav Škripek (OL'ANO)	Boris Zala (Smer)	Pál Csáky (MK)	Richard Sulík (SAS)	József Nagy (Most–Híd)	Jana Žitňanská (NOVA)	13 seats	
2019	Monika Beňová (Smer)	Ivan Štefanec (KDH)	Róbert Hajšel (Smer)	Miriam Lexmann* (KDH)	Michal Šimečka (PS)	Miroslav Čiž (Smer)	Martin Hojsík (PS)	Peter Pollák (OL'ANO)	Vladimír Bilčík (Spolu)	Milan Uhrík (L'SNS/ Republic Movement)	Lucia Ďuriš Nicholsonová (SAS)	Eugen Jurzyca (SAS)	Miroslav Radačovský (L'SNS)	Michal Wiezik (Spolu /PS)	14 seats
2022	Monika Beňová (Smer)	Ivan Štefanec (KDH)	Róbert Hajšel (Smer)	Miriam Lexmann* (KDH)	Michal Šimečka (PS)	Katarína Roth Neveďalová (Smer)	Martin Hojsík (PS)	Peter Pollák (OL'ANO)	Vladimír Bilčík (Spolu)	Milan Uhrík (L'SNS/ Republic Movement)	Lucia Ďuriš Nicholsonová (SAS)	Eugen Jurzyca (SAS)	Miroslav Radačovský (L'SNS)	Michal Wiezik (Spolu /PS)	14 seats
2023	Monika Beňová (Smer)	Ivan Štefanec (KDH)	Róbert Hajšel (Smer)	Miriam Lexmann* (KDH)	Jozef Mihál (PS)	Katarína Roth Neveďalová (Smer)	Martin Hojsík (PS)	Peter Pollák (OL'ANO)	Vladimír Bilčík (Spolu)	Milan Uhrík (L'SNS/ Republic Movement)	Lucia Ďuriš Nicholsonová (SAS)	Eugen Jurzyca (SAS)	Miroslav Radačovský (L'SNS)	Michal Wiezik (Spolu /PS)	14 seats
2024	Monika Beňová (Smer)	Branislav Ondruš (Hlas)	Ľuboš Blaha (Smer)	Miriam Lexmann* (KDH)	Ľudovít Ódor (PS)	Katarína Roth Neveďalová (Smer)	Martin Hojsík (PS)	Veronika Cifrová Ostrihoňová (PS)	Ľubica Karvašová (PS)	Milan Uhrík (L'SNS/ Republic Movement)	Lucia Yar (PS)	Judita Laššáková (Smer)	Erik Kaliňák (Smer)	Michal Wiezik (Spolu /PS)	Milan Mazurek (Republic Movement)

== Elections ==
=== 2004 ===
The 2004 European election was the sixth election to the European Parliament. As Slovakia had only joined the European Union earlier that month, it was the first European election held in that state. The election took place on 13 June 2004.

=== 2009 ===
The 2009 European election was the seventh election to the European Parliament and the second for Slovakia. The number of seats was reduced to thirteen.

=== 2014 ===
The 2014 European election was the eighth election to the European Parliament and the third for Slovakia.

=== 2019 ===
The 2019 European election was the ninth election to the European Parliament and the fourth for Slovakia.

=== 2024 ===
The 2024 European election was the tenth election to the European Parliament and the fifth for Slovakia.
