= List of members of the European Parliament for Slovakia, 2009–2014 =

Members of the European Parliament for Slovakia
Observers	(2003)
Delegation	(2004)
6th term	(2004)
7th term	(2009)
8th term	(2014)
9th term	(2019)
10th term	(2024)

This is a list of the 13 members of the European Parliament for Slovakia in the 2009 to 2014 session.

== List ==
Name	National party	EP Group	Votes
Edit Bauer	Party of the Hungarian Coalition	EPP	39,721
Monika Beňová	Direction–Social Democracy	S&D	107,097
Sergej Kozlík	People's Party–Movement for a Democratic Slovakia	ALDE	41,990
Eduard Kukan	Democratic and Christian Union–Democratic Party	EPP	80,244
Vladimír Maňka	Direction–Social Democracy	S&D	42,885
Alajos Mészáros	Party of the Hungarian Coalition	EPP	20,652
Miroslav Mikolášik	Christian Democratic Movement	EPP	29,764
Katarína Neveďalová	Direction–Social Democracy	S&D	4,378
Jaroslav Paška	National Party	EFD	12,981
Monika Smolková	Direction–Social Democracy	S&D	15,830
Peter Šťastný	Democratic and Christian Union–Democratic Party	EPP	41,847
Boris Zala	Direction–Social Democracy	S&D	102,940
Anna Záborská	Christian Democratic Movement	EPP	43,356

=== Party representation ===
National party	EP Group	Seats	±
Direction–Social Democracy	S&D	5 / 13	▲2
Democratic and Christian Union–Democratic Party	EPP	2 / 13	▼1
Party of the Hungarian Coalition	EPP–ED	2 / 13	Steady
Christian Democratic Movement	EPP–ED	2 / 13	▼1
People's Party–Movement for a Democratic Slovakia	NI	1 / 13	▼2
National Party	EFD	1 / 13	▲1
