= List of members of the European Parliament for Slovakia, 2014–2019 =

This is a list of members of the European Parliament for the Slovakia in the 2014 to 2019 session, ordered by name.

See 2014 European Parliament election in Slovakia for further information on these elections in Slovakia.

Members of the European Parliament for Slovakia
Observers	(2003)
Delegation	(2004)
6th term	(2004)
7th term	(2009)
8th term	(2014)
9th term	(2019)
10th term	(2024)

== List ==
This table can be sorted by name, party or party group: click the symbol at the top of the appropriate column.

Name	National party	EP group
Pál Csáky	Party of the Hungarian Community (SMK-MKP)	EPP
Monika Flašíková-Beňová	Direction – Social Democracy (Smer-SD)	S&D
Eduard Kukan	Democratic and Christian Union – Democratic Party (SDKÚ-DS)	EPP
Vladimír Maňka	Direction – Social Democracy (Smer-SD)	S&D
Miroslav Mikolášik	Christian Democratic Movement (KDH)	EPP
József Nagy	Most–Híd	EPP
Branislav Škripek	Ordinary People (OĽaNO)	ECR
Monika Smolková	Direction – Social Democracy (Smer-SD)	S&D
Ivan Štefanec	Christian Democratic Movement (KDH)	EPP
Richard Sulík	Freedom and Solidarity (SAS)	ECR
Anna Záborská	Christian Democratic Movement (KDH)	EPP
Boris Zala	Direction – Social Democracy (Smer-SD)	S&D
Jana Žitňanská	New Majority (NOVA )	ECR
