= List of observers to the European Parliament for Slovakia, 2003–2004 =

List of the 14 observers to the European Parliament for Slovakia

Members of the European Parliament for Slovakia
Observers	(2003)
Delegation	(2004)
6th term	(2004)
7th term	(2009)
8th term	(2014)
9th term	(2019)
10th term	(2024)

This is a list of the 14 observers to the European Parliament for Slovakia in the 1999 to 2004 session. They were appointed by the Slovak Parliament as observers from 1 May 2003 until the accession of Slovakia to the EU on 1 May 2004.

== List ==
Name	National party	EP group
Edit Bauer	Party of the Hungarian Coalition	EPP–ED
Monika Beňová	Direction–Social Democracy	PES
Robert Fico	Direction–Social Democracy	PES
Ján Figeľ	Christian Democratic Movement	EPP–ED
Pavol Kubovič	Democratic and Christian Union–Democratic Party	EPP–ED
Zuzana Martináková	Democratic and Christian Union–Democratic Party	EPP–ED
Petra Masácová	Democratic and Christian Union–Democratic Party	EPP–ED
László Nagy	Party of the Hungarian Coalition	EPP–ED
Anna Záborská	Christian Democratic Movement	EPP–ED
