= List of members of the European Parliament for Slovakia, 2004 =

Members of the European Parliament for Slovakia
Observers	(2003)
Delegation	(2004)
6th term	(2004)
7th term	(2009)
8th term	(2014)
9th term	(2019)
10th term	(2024)

This is the list of appointed members to the members of the European Parliament for Slovakia from 1 May 2004 until the first direct election on 13 June 2004.

== List ==
Name	National party	EP group
Edit Bauer	Party of the Hungarian Coalition	EPP–ED
Monika Beňová	Direction–Social Democracy	PES
Anna Záborská	Christian Democratic Movement	EPP–ED
