= List of members of the European Parliament for Slovakia, 2024–2029 =

Members of the European Parliament for Slovakia
Observers	(2003)
Delegation	(2004)
6th term	(2004)
7th term	(2009)
8th term	(2014)
9th term	(2019)
10th term	(2024)

This is a list of the 15 members of the European Parliament for Slovakia in the 2024 to 2029 session. The members were elected in the 2024 European Parliament election in Slovakia.

== List ==
Name	National party	EP Group
Ľudovít Ódor	Progressive Slovakia (PS)	RE
Veronika Cifrová Ostrihoňová	Progressive Slovakia (PS)	RE
Martin Hojsík	Progressive Slovakia (PS)	RE
Ľubica Karvašová	Progressive Slovakia (PS)	RE
Michal Wiezik	Progressive Slovakia (PS)	RE
Lucia Yar	Progressive Slovakia (PS)	RE
Monika Beňová	Direction – Social Democracy (Smer)	Non-attached members
Ľuboš Blaha	Direction – Social Democracy (Smer)	Non-attached members
Erik Kaliňák	Direction – Social Democracy (Smer)	Non-attached members
Judita Laššáková	Direction – Social Democracy (Smer)	Non-attached members
Katarína Roth Neveďalová	Direction – Social Democracy (Smer)	Non-attached members
Milan Uhrík	Republic Movement	ESN
Milan Mazurek	Republic Movement	ESN
Branislav Ondruš	Voice – Social Democracy (Hlas)	Non-attached member
Miriam Lexmann	Christian Democratic Movement (KDH)	EPP
