= List of members of the European Parliament for Slovakia, 2019–2024 =

This is a list of the 14 members of the European Parliament for Slovakia in the 2019 to 2024 session.

Members of the European Parliament for Slovakia
Observers	(2003)
Delegation	(2004)
6th term	(2004)
7th term	(2009)
8th term	(2014)
9th term	(2019)
10th term	(2024)

These MEPs were elected at the 2019 European Parliament election in Slovakia.

== List ==
On the Progressive Slovakia–Together list: (Renew)–(EPP Group)

1. Michal Šimečka (PS)
2. Vladimír Bilčík (SPOLU)
3. Michal Wiezik (SPOLU)
4. Martin Hojsík (PS)

On the Direction – Social Democracy list: (S&D)

1. Monika Beňová
2. Miroslav Čiž
3. Róbert Hajšel

On the Kotleba – People's Party Our Slovakia list: (Non-Inscrits)

1. Milan Uhrík
2. Miroslav Radačovský

On the Freedom and Solidarity list: (ECR)

1. Lucia Ďuriš Nicholsonová
2. Eugen Jurzyca

On the Christian Democratic Movement list: (EPP Group)

1. Ivan Štefanec
2. Miriam Lexmann – since 1 February 2020

On the Ordinary People and Independent Personalities list: (EPP Group)

1. Peter Pollák

== Replacements ==
- Miriam Lexmann took her newly created seat following Brexit
- Katarína Roth Neveďalová replaced Miroslav Číž following his death on 29 December 2022
- Jozef Mihál replaced Michal Šimečka following his resignation on 24 October 2023 to sit in the National Council

== See also ==
- List of members of the European Parliament, 2019–2024
- 2019 European Parliament election
- Politics of Slovakia
