= 2009 European Parliament election in Slovakia =

- 6 June 2009

13 seats to the European Parliament
- Turnout: 853,533 (19.64%) ▲2.68 pp
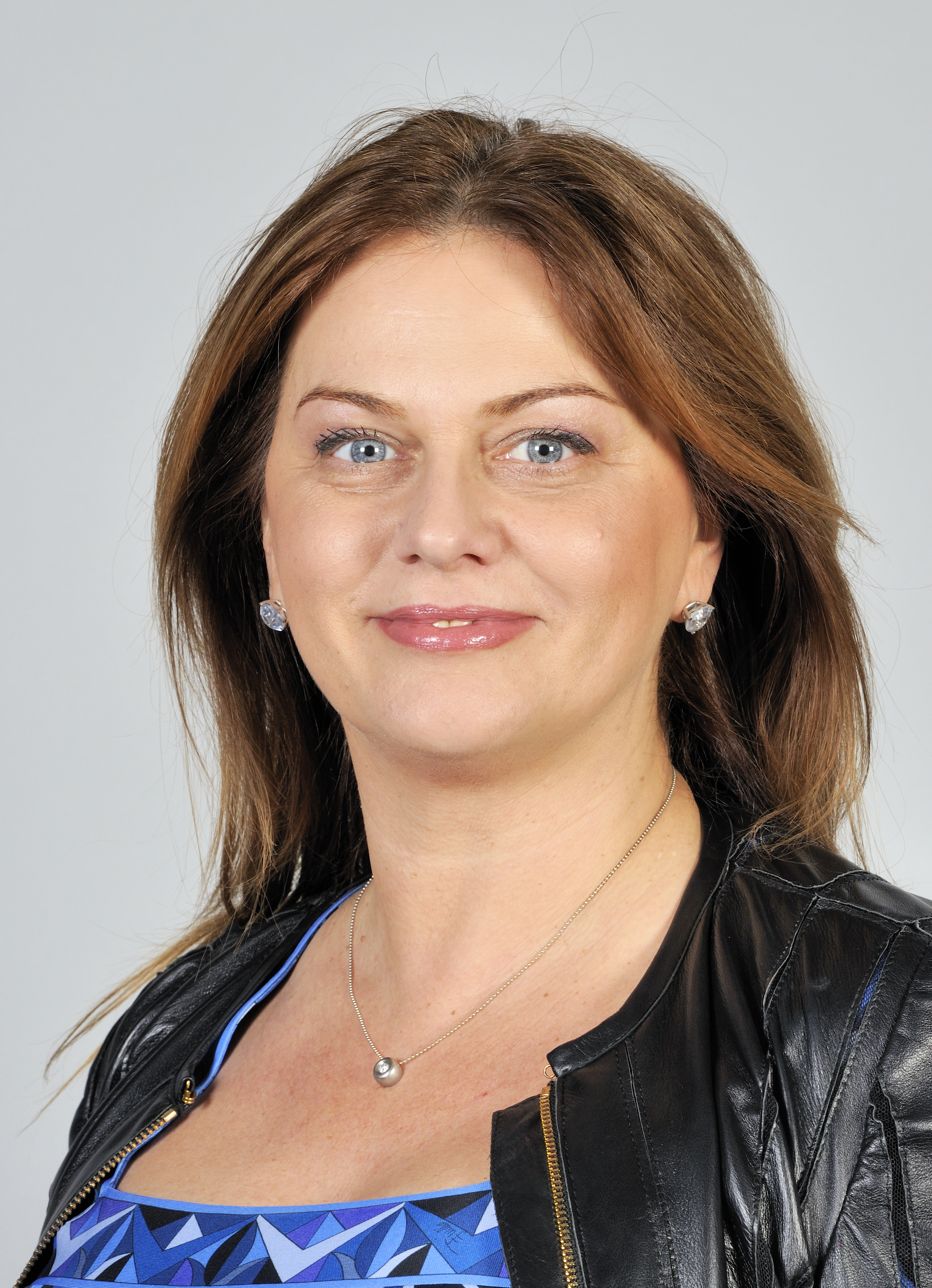

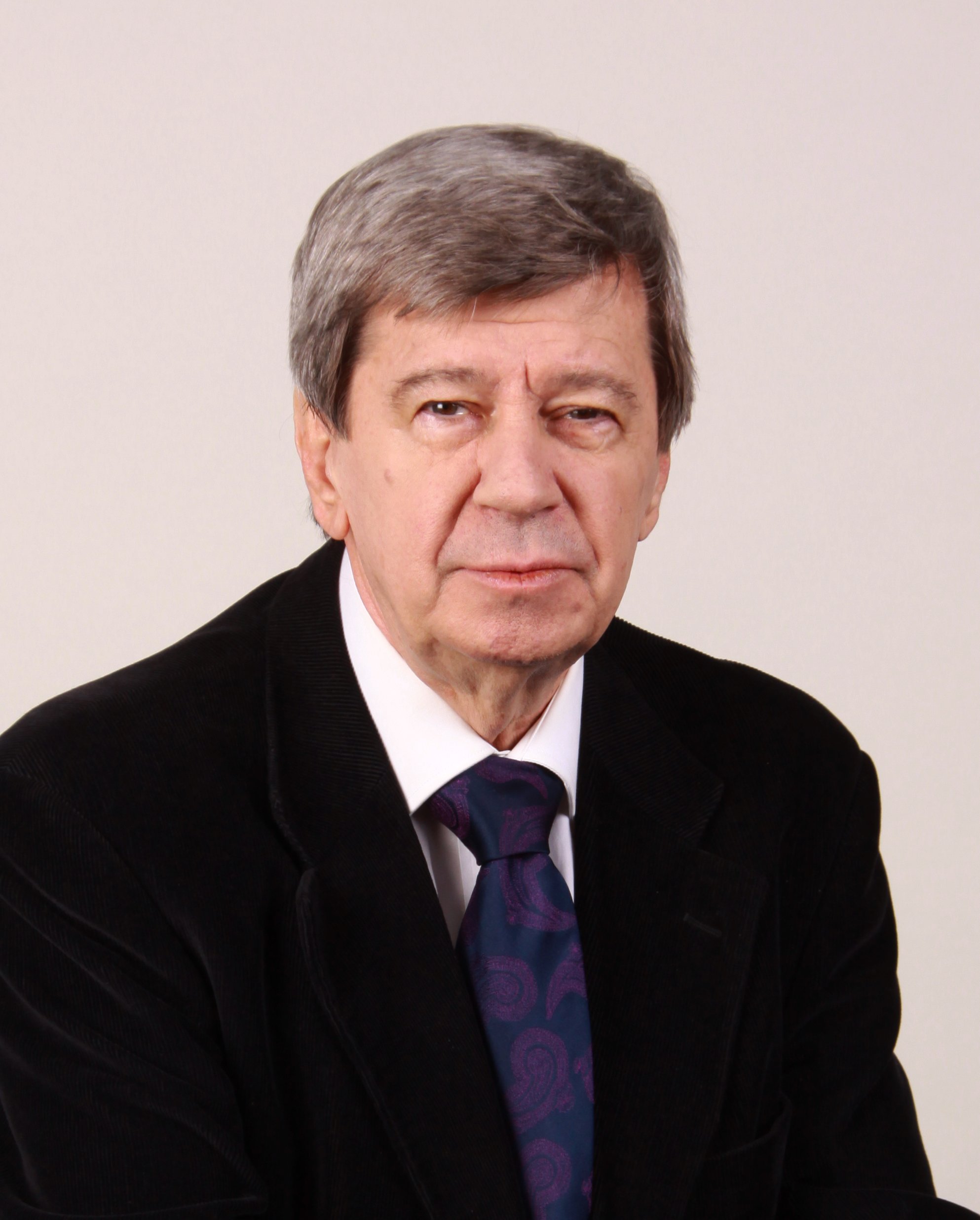

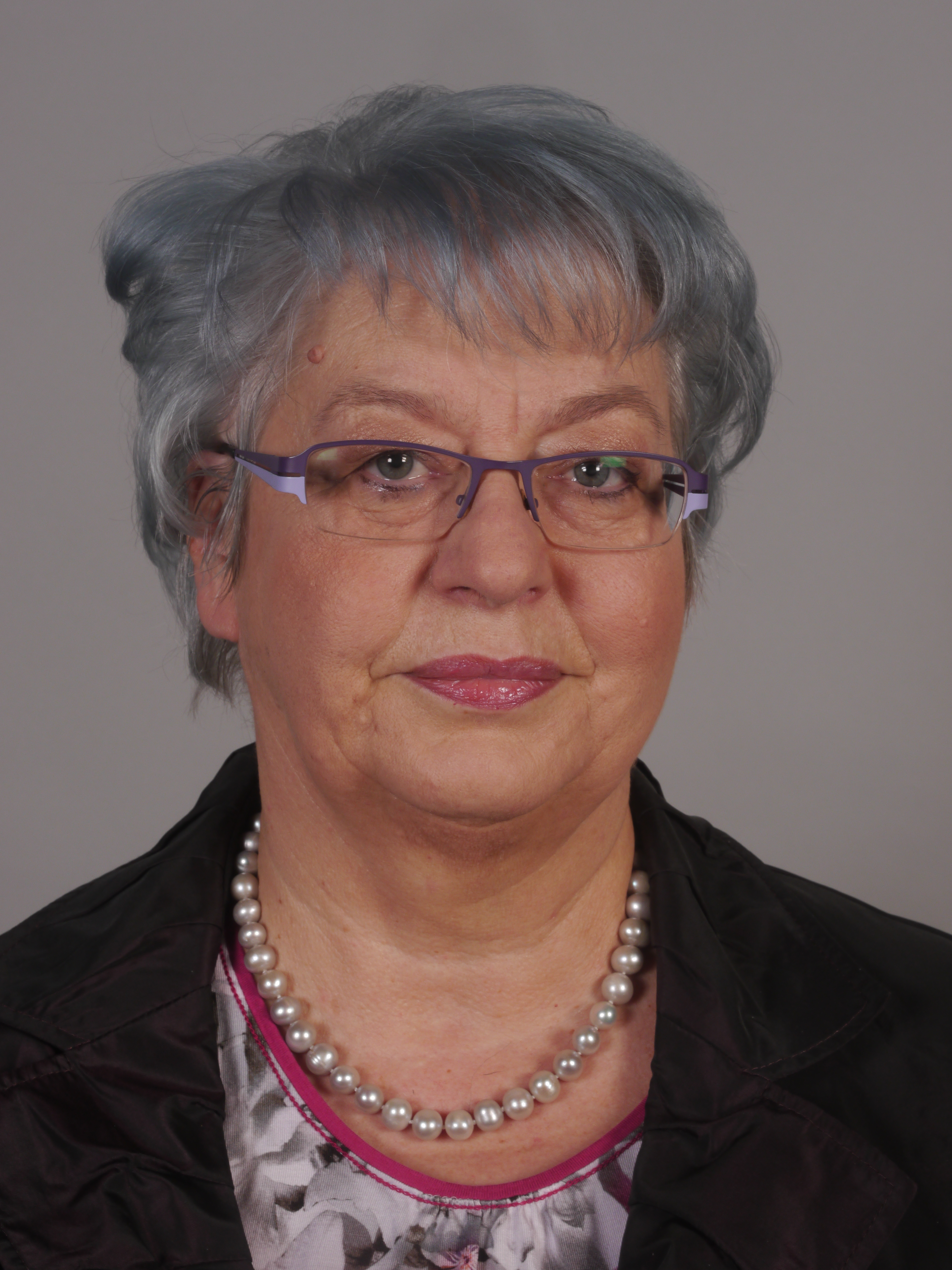

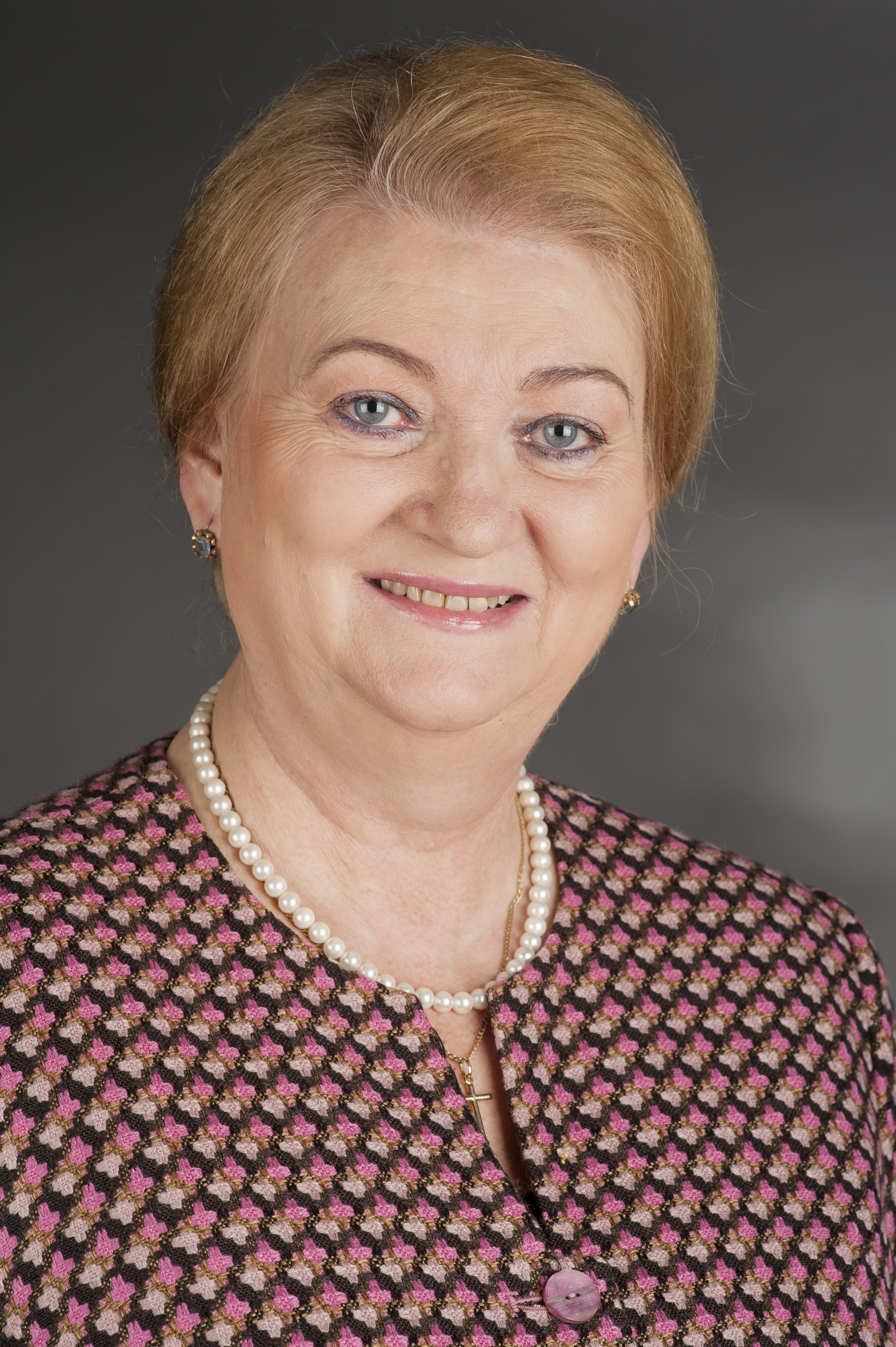
	First party	Second party	Third party
Leader	Monika Beňová	Eduard Kukan	Edit Bauer
Party	Smer-SD	SDKÚ–DS	SMK
Alliance	S&D	EPP	EPP
Last election	3 seats, 16.89%	3 seats, 17.09%	2 seats, 13.24%
Seats won	5	2	2
Seat change	▲2	▼1	0
Popular vote	264,722	140,426	93,750
Percentage	32.01%	16.98%	11,33%
Swing	▲15.12	▼0.11	▼1,91
	Fourth party	Fifth party	Sixth party
Leader	Anna Záborská	Sergej Kozlík	Jaroslav Paška
Party	KDH	ĽS-HZDS	SNS
Alliance	EPP	ALDE	EFDD
Last election	3 seats, 16.19%	3 seats, 17.04%	0 seats, 2.02%
Seats won	2	1	1
Seat change	▼1	▼2	▲1
Popular vote	89,905	74,241	45,960
Percentage	10.87%	8.97%	5.55%
Swing	▼5.22	▼8.07	▲3.53

An election of the delegation from Slovakia to the European Parliament was held in 2009.

The turnout, although increased compared to the previous election, was 19.63%, the lowest of any nation involved in the election.

== Results ==
Party	Votes	%	+/–	Seats	+/–
Direction – Social Democracy	264,722	32.02	+15.12	5	+2
Slovak Democratic and Christian Union – Democratic Party	140,426	16.98	–0.12	2	–1
Party of the Hungarian Coalition	93,750	11.34	–1.91	2	0
Christian Democratic Movement	89,905	10.87	–5.33	2	–1
People's Party – Movement for a Democratic Slovakia	74,241	8.98	–8.06	1	–2
Slovak National Party	45,960	5.56	+3.54	1	+1
Freedom and Solidarity	39,016	4.72	New	0	New
Green Party	17,482	2.11	New	0	New
Conservative Democrats–Civic Conservative Party	17,409	2.11	+1.09	0	0
Communist Party of Slovakia	13,643	1.65	–2.89	0	0
Free Forum	13,063	1.58	–1.68	0	0
Party of the Democratic Left	5,158	0.62	New	0	New
Agrarian and Countryside Party	3,721	0.45	New	0	New
Mission 21 – Christian Solidarity Movement	3,515	0.43	New	0	New
Democratic Party	2,398	0.29	New	0	New
League, Civic–Liberal Party	2,373	0.29	New	0	New
Total	826,782	100.00	–	13	–1
Valid votes	826,782	96.87			
Invalid/blank votes	26,751	3.13			
Total votes	853,533	100.00			
Registered voters/turnout	4,345,773	19.64			
Source: Volby

== Division of seats ==
The system of dividing seats to the different lists is somewhat different in Slovakia, compared to some other countries. Firstly the election authorities count the total number of valid votes for parties who have gained more than 5% of the total. In this case there were 709004 such votes (85.75% of the total). This number is divided by 14 (13 seats plus one) to create the RVC (republic election number) or quota, in this case 50643 (6.13% of all valid votes cast). Parties are assigned one seat for the number of times they fill the quota. At this initial stage 5 seats were awarded to SMER, 2 to SDKU, 1 to SMK, 1 to KDH and 1 to HZDS leaving 3 seats still unfilled.

In Slovakia's system of proportional representation, the parties needing the fewest votes to get to their next quota are given the remaining seats. In this case those seats went to SMK, KDH and SNS. This is described in more detail at https://web.archive.org/web/20091119032933/http://www.volbysr.sk/volbyep2009/sr/tab4_en.html

In the D'Hondt method of proportional representation (as used for example in British Euro elections), the quota is progressively reduced until it reaches a number at which the correct number of candidates is elected. If this system had been applied in Slovakia, it would have resulted in the quota being reduced to 45960 (5.55% of the total), with the remaining 3 seats going to SDKU, SMK and SNS.

== Awarding of seats to candidates ==
Each voter who voted for a party was also allowed to select two candidates from that party. The seats were awarded to candidates in order of the number of preference votes they received, provided that they received preferences from at least 10 percent of all the voters who chose the particular party.

=== Direction – Social Democracy (SMER) ===
List Ranking	Name	Valid Preferential Votes
1	Boris Zala	102940
2	Vladimír Maňka	42885
3	Monika Flašíková – Beňová	107097
4	Monika Smolková	15830
5	Katarína Neveďalová	4378
6	Alexander Kurtanský	5221
7	Peter Hanulík	10202
8	Gabriela Kečkéšová	3838
9	Peter Markovič	4793
10	Jozef Štrba	5964
11	Vladislav Petráš	1905
12	Svetlana Pavlovičová	12095
13	Milan Magát	3241

Monika Flašíková – Beňová, Boris Zala and Vladimír Maňka were awarded seats they had the most personal preference votes and had received those votes from at least 10 percent of SMER's voters. The remaining seats were awarded on the basis of the party list ordering, the fourth seat going to Monika Smolková, (who was also coincidentally in fourth place in terms of personal preferences) and the fifth seat going to Katarína Neveďalová (who was actually tenth in order of personal preference votes).

=== Slovak Democratic and Christian Union – Democratic Party (SDKÚ-DS) ===
List Ranking	Name	Valid Preferential Votes
1	Eduard Kukan	80244
2	Peter Šťastný	41847
3	Milan Gaľa	11613
4	Pavol Kubovič	3955
5	Jarmila Tkáčová	5250
6	Zita Pleštinská	13386
7	Juraj Šváč	3098
8	Marián Török	2829
9	Júlia Hurná	2354
10	Eugen Szép	855
11	Alexander Slafkovský	4411
12	Štefan Mikula	1534

Eduard Kukan and Peter Šťastný were awarded seats they had the most personal preference votes and had received those votes from at least 10 percent of the SDKU's voters.

=== Party of the Hungarian Coalition (SMK) ===
List Ranking	Name	Valid Preferential Votes
1	Edit Bauer	39721
2	Alajos Mészáros	20652
3	Attila Lancz	5358
4	Sándor Albert	12380
5	Szabolcs Hodosy	11139
6	Zoltán Bara	6398
7	Gábor Klenovics	2297
8	Zsuzsanna Andrássy	4863
9	Pál Banai Tóth	3674
10	Béla Keszegh	7746
11	Csaba Cúth	4581
12	Július Slovák	2918
13	Gergely Agócs	3021

Edit Bauer and Alajos Mészáros were awarded seats they had the most personal preference votes and had received those votes from at least 10 percent of the SMK's voters.

=== Christian Democratic Movement (KDH) ===
List Ranking	Name	Valid Preferential Votes
1	Martin Fronc	15861
2	Ján Hudacký	17730
3	Anna Záborská	43356
4	Miroslav Mikolášik	29764
5	Ján Vančo	2486
6	Peter Lenč	1087
7	Renáta Ocilková	2078
8	Pavol Kossey	3655
9	Martin Hladký	711
10	Martin Krajčovič	888
11	Martin Kalafut	600
12	Jozef Bobík	2100
13	Ján Morovič	1288

Anna Záborská and Miroslav Mikolášik were awarded seats they had the most personal preference votes and had received those votes from at least 10 percent of the KDH's voters.

=== People's Party – Movement for a Democratic Slovakia (ĽS-HZDS) ===
List Ranking	Name	Valid Preferential Votes
1	Sergej Kozlík	41 990
2	Peter Baco	21226
3	Irena Belohorská	22948
4	Ivana Kapráliková	2147
5	Diana Štrofová	1950
6	Ján Kovarčík	1711
7	Jaroslav Jaduš	1399
8	Jaroslav Ďaďo	2952
9	Pavol Krištof	1150
10	Beáta Sániová	955
11	Jana Kandráčová	1093
12	Igor Liška	893
13	Ladislav Kokoška	851

Sergej Kozlík was awarded the seat as he had the most personal preference votes and had received those votes from at least 10 percent of HZDS's voters.

=== Slovak National Party (SNS) ===
List Ranking	Name	Valid Preferential Votes
1	Dušan Švantner	9292
2	Jaroslav Paška	12981
3	Vladimír Čečot	3737
4	Daniel Klačko	2929
5	Tatiana Poliaková	2156
6	Štefan Zelník	3691
7	Rafael Rafaj	10277
8	Emil Vestenický	914
9	Augustín Jozef Lang	333
10	Vladislav Bachár	207
11	Roman Stopka	965
12	Ján Stanecký	835
13	Stanislav Čečko	1492

Jaroslav Paška was awarded the one SNS seat, as he had the most personal preference votes and had received those votes from at least 10 percent of the SNS's electors.

=== The overall effect of preference voting and the 10% rule ===
Of the 13 candidate elected, 11 were elected due to the number of personal preference votes they were given, and 2 were elected due to their positions on the party lists.

The 11 candidates elected due to personal preferences included 3 (KDH's Anna Záborská and Miroslav Mikolášik as well as SNS's Jaroslav Paška) whose list positions did not in themselves justify a seat so could be said to have been elected solely by preferential voting. The remaining 8 candidates (SMER's Boris Zala, Vladimír Maňka and Monika Flašíková – Beňová, the SDKU's Eduard Kukan and Peter Šťastný, the SMK's Edit Bauer and Alajos Mészáros as well as the HZDS's Sergej Kozlík) all would have been elected anyway if there was no preference voting in the system (as in some other member states) and the party list ordering had been used alone. These 8 people would not have been elected if their personal voters had chosen other candidates, so they were not in any way guaranteed seats as a result of their list positions.

The two candidates elected due to their positions on the party lists were from SMER. One (Monika Smolková) would also have been elected due to her personal preferences if the 10 percent rule had not been in operation but the other (Katarína Neveďalová) was elected solely as a result of her position on the party list.

== See also ==
http://www.statistics.sk/volbyep2009/sr/tab3.jsp?lang=en
