= Hungarian Federalist Party =

The Hungarian Federalist Party (Hungarian: Magyar Föderalista Párt) was a Slovak political party defending the interests of the Hungarians in Slovakia. It was founded in 2000 as right-wing alternative to the compromise-friendly Party of the Hungarian Coalition. It was backed by the World Federation of Hungarians. In 2003, it organized a protest with the World Federation of Hungarians and the Sixty-Four Counties Youth Movement. It only contested in the 2004 European Parliament election, where it received 0.22%. It had a status of observer in the European Free Alliance until its disbanding in 2005 for a failed re-register alongside 86 other parties.
