= Fedor Flašík =

Slovak political marketer (1958–2024)

- Born: 14 January 1958; Bratislava, Czechoslovakia
- Died: 22 April 2024 (aged 66); Prague, Czech Republic
- Occupation: Campaign manager
- Years active: 1994–2024
- Known for: Leading the election campaigns of the HZDS and Smer parties
- Spouse: Monika Beňová (m. 2006; div. 2017)

Fedor Flašík (14 January 1958 – 22 April 2024) was a Slovak political marketer and businessman.

== Biography ==
=== Early life ===
Fedor Flašík was born on 14 January 1958 in Bratislava. In 1982, he graduated from the Comenius University with a law degree. Following graduation, he worked as a head of sales and later in the central committee of the Union of Czechoslovak-Soviet friendship. After the Velvet Revolution, he worked as the assistor to the director of the Ludus theatre and assistant editor of the M-Report daily. Afterwards, he was the executive director of marketing for the VHS distributor Davay.

=== Campaign manager for HZDS ===
In the 1990s, Flašík headed his own advertising agency Donar. The Donar agency was in charge of the campaign of the Movement for a Democratic Slovakia (HZDS) in the 1994 Slovak parliamentary election. To promote the image of HZDS as the main nationalist force, Flašík organized public celebrations of Slovakia's independence and hired the popular songwriter Kamil Peteraj to compose the song HZDS campaign song Vivat Slovakia. In 1998, when the term of the president Michal Kováč, who had been a HZDS member but as the president became one of the chief critics of the authoritarian conduct of the party, was about to expire, Fedor Flašík commissioned giant countdown clock to be installed in front of the presidential palace. After the death of Kováč in 2016, Flašík apologized for installing the countdown clock. Flašík also led HZDS campaign in the 1998 Slovak parliamentary election, which the party won but ended up in opposition after failing to find coalition partners. After this failure, the relationship between the leader of HZDS Vladimír Mečiar and Flašík became increasingly stranded, in particular as Mečiar started facing allegations of facilitating multi-million payments for Donar by the state-owned monopoly utility providers.

=== Campaign manager for SMER ===
Already in 1998 while working for HZDS, Flašík started cooperating with young MP of the Party of the Democratic Left Robert Fico. After Fico started his own party Direction – Social Democracy (SMER) in 1999, Flašík became its campaign manager. Initially, Flašík was highly regarded by Fico, who once dubbed him "master campaigner, capable of turning water in Coca Cola". However, after the law and order-focused campaign failed to win the 2002 Slovak parliamentary election for SMER, the relationship between the two men deteriorated. By 2004, Fico ceased all formal contacts with Flašík and removed several of his close associates from leading positions in the party. Nonetheless, Flašík retained business relationships with prominent SMER politician Martin Glváč.

=== Other activities ===
Flašík unsuccessfully ran for the post of the chairman of the state broadcaster Radio and Television of Slovakia twice, in 2011 and 2017. In the late 1990s, he was involved with the failed production of the movie about the legendary Slovak outlaw Juraj Jánošík. From 2020 until his death, Flašík was the editor of the website eReport.

In 2007, Flašík competed in the reality show Celebrity Camp. In 2009, he competed in the Slovak version of the show Let's Dance.

== Ilness and death ==
In 2010, Flašík was diagnosed with lymphoma in the abdomen. In April 2024, he was hospitalized in Bratislava in grave condition. Soon after, he was transported to the Motol University Hospital in Prague. Fedor Flašík died in the Motol Hospital on 22 April 2024.

== Personal life ==
Between 2006 and 2017, Flašík was married to the SMER politician Monika Beňová.
