= Branislav Škripek =

Slovak politician

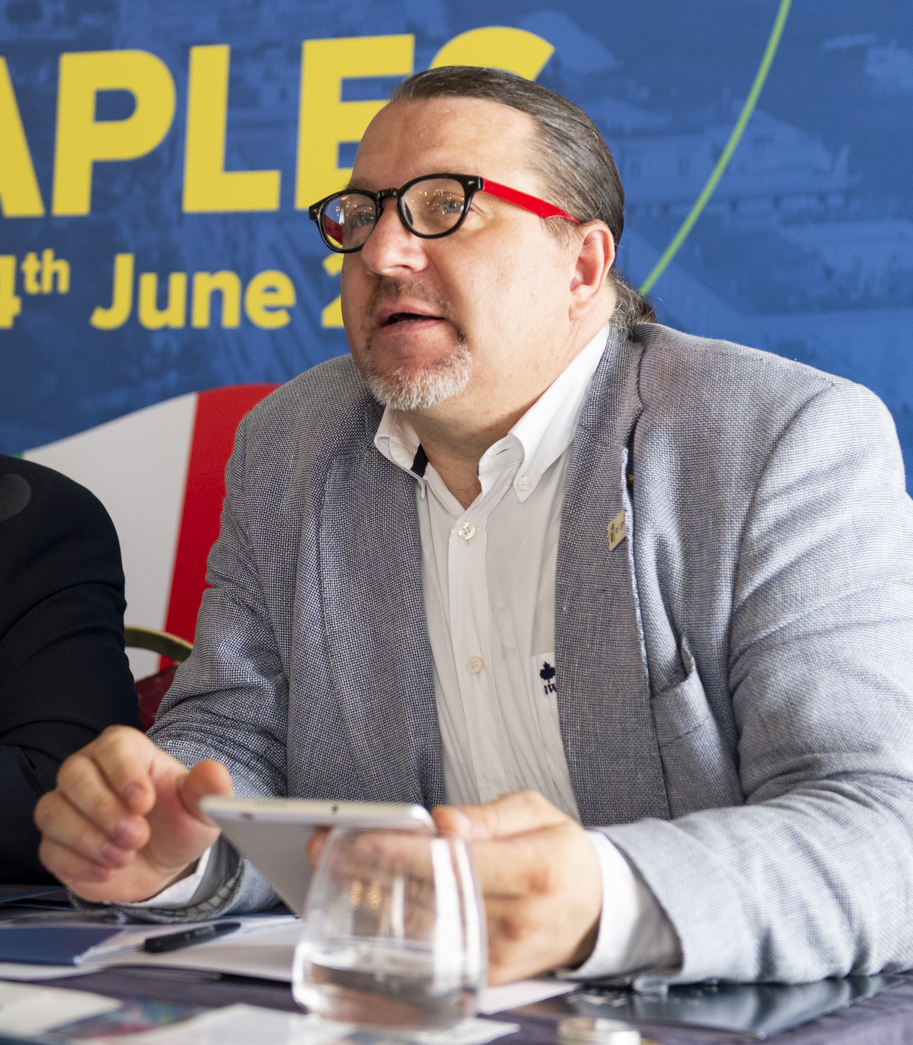
- Škripek in 2019

Member of the European Parliament for Slovakia
- In office 2 July 2014 – 1 July 2019

Member of the National Council
- Incumbent
- Assumed office 25 October 2023
- In office 4 April 2012 – 1 July 2014

Personal details
- Born: 30 August 1970 (age 56) Piešťany, Czechoslovakia
- Party: OĽaNO (2012–2019); KÚ (2019–2023); KDH (2023–present)
- Spouse: Andrea Škripeková
- Children: 3
- Education: Comenius University
- Occupation: Politician
- Profession: Translator

Branislav Škripek (born 30 August 1970) is a Slovak politician. He has served as Member of the National Council of Slovakia since 2023, having previously served as an MP from 2012 to 2014. From 2014 to 2019 he served as a Member of the European Parliament.

== Early life ==
Škripek was born in Piešťany. He studied Catholic Theology at the Comenius University. Following his graduation, he started a Charismatic community in Bratislava, which has included the prime minister Eduard Heger. In addition, Škripek translated Christian literature and edited a Christian magazine.

== Politics ==
In the 2012 Slovak parliamentary election Škripek became an MP for the populist movement Ordinary People and Independent Personalities (OĽaNO). He gained media notoriety for scolding fellow MPs for being rude to each other and attempting to ban depictions of nudity in the media. In 2014 European Parliament election in Slovakia, Škripek gained the sole OĽaNO mandate by preferential votes. In the EP, he was a member of the European Christian Political Movement and a part of the European Conservatives and Reformists group.

In the 2019 European Parliament election in Slovakia, Škripek was not included on the OĽaNO list due to his conflict with the party leader Igor Matovič. Subsequently he joined another snubbed former MEP, Anna Záborská and co-founded a new party called Christian Union.

Although the Christian Union failed to pass the representation threshold in the European Elections, it beat expectations by receiving over 3% of the vote as a new party with limited notability and resources. In spite of Škripek's opposition, Christian Union leaders other than himself ran in the 2020 Slovak parliamentary election on the OĽaNO list. In 2023 elections, Škripek united with KDH, from where Záborská once departed, to aid in united conservative and Christian democratic electorate and aid in return to parliament after 7 years.

== Personal life ==
Škripek is married to a fellow Charismatic Christian Andrea. They have two sons together. In addition, before his marriage Škripek adopted a disabled five year old orphan Marcel. Marcel died at the age of twenty two.
