= Zita Pleštinská =

Slovak politician

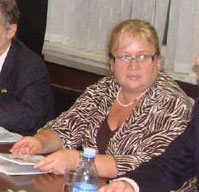

Member of the National Council of the Slovak Republic
- Incumbent
- Assumed office from 21 March 2020

Member of the European Parliament
- In office 20 July 2004 – 13 July 2009

Mayor of Chmeľnica
- Incumbent
- Assumed office from 2014

Personal details
- Born: June 13, 1961 (age 64) Nitra, Czechoslovakia
- Party: KDH (1991–2000); SDK (1998–2000); SDKÚ–DS (2000–2016); OĽaNO (from 2018)
- Occupation: Politician, architect
- Website: http://www.plestinska.sk/

Zita Pleštinská (born Zita Kányai on 13 June 1961 in Nitra) is a Slovak politician and current mayor of the village of Chmeľnica. Pleštinská is a former Member of the European Parliament with the Slovenská demokratická a kresťanská únia, part of the European People's Party. She was on the European Parliament's Committee on the Internal Market and Consumer Protection and Committee on Women's Rights and Gender Equality, and also served as a substitute for the Committee on Regional Development, as a member of the Delegation to the EU-Ukraine Parliamentary Cooperation Committee and as a substitute for the Delegation for relations with Australia and New Zealand.

== Education ==
- 1985: Technical University of Budapest, Faculty of Architecture
- 1993: The Certificate in professional expertise in the regional development
- 2000: SPP diploma (Special Preparatory Programme for Structural Funds)
- 2001: Cooperation and preparation of PHARE projects
- 2002: The Certificate in professional expertise in regional management, public and concession procurement

== Career ==
- 1985-1991: Chief Architect's Department in Stará Ľubovňa - Deputy Director
- 1991-1996: District Office of the Environment in Stará Ľubovňa - Head of Department for Regional Planning and Land Engineering
- 1996-1998: District Office in Stará Ľubovnňa - Officer at the Environmental Department
- 1998-2002: District Office in Stará Ľubovňa - Deputy Director
- 2002-2004: District Office in Stará Ľubovňa - Director; Head of Department of Regional Development
- 2002-2006: Municipality Chmeľnica - Mayor (1st Term)
- 2004–2009: The European Parliament - Member
- 2010: District Office in Stará Ľubovňa - Director
- Present: Municipality Chmeľnica - Mayor

== Political Activity ==
- 1991-2000: KDH (Christian Democratic Movement)
- 1998-2000: SDK (Slovak Democratic Coalition)
- 2000–present: SDKÚ-DS (Slovak Democratic and Christian Union - Democratic Party) - Member of the Slovak board of SDKÚ, Member of regional union of SDKÚ Prešov

== See also ==
- 2004 European Parliament election in Slovakia
