= Irena Belohorská =

Slovak politician (born 1948)

Irena Belohorská (born 13 March 1948 in Piešťany) is a Slovak politician and Member of the European Parliament with the Ludova strana - Hnutie za demokraticke Slovensko from 2004 to 2009.

She sits on its Committee on the Environment, Public Health and Food Safety, and is a substitute for the Committee on Foreign Affairs and a member of the Delegation for relations with the countries of Central America.

== Education ==
- 1976: Certificate of postgraduate study, grade one, in gynaecology and obstetrics
- 1982: Certificate of postgraduate study in clinical oncology
- 1992: European School of Oncology

== Career ==
- 1973-1976: Doctor's assistant
- 1977-1983: National Oncological Institute
- 1983-1986: Expert doctor, Tunis
- 1986-2002: Head doctor of the Preventive Centre at the National Oncological Institute
- 1992-1993: Head of a faculty hospital
- 1993: Head of the Office of the Ministry of Defence
- 1993: State Secretary at the Ministry of Foreign Affairs
- 1993-1994: Minister of Health
- 1993: Member of HZDS (Movement for a Democratic Slovakia)
- 1996: Chairwoman of a town organisation of HZDS
- 1999: Member of the European Democrat Group at the Council of Europe
- 1992: Member of the Federal Assembly of the Czechoslovak Federative Republic
- 1994-2004: Member of the National Council of the Slovak Republic
- 1994-1998: Vice-Chairwoman of the Foreign Affairs Committee
- 1994-1998: Vice-Chairwoman of the Committee for European Integration
- 2002-2004: Vice-Chairwoman of the Human Rights Committee
- 1994-2004: Member of the Permanent Delegation of the National Council of the Slovak Republic to the Council of Europe
- 1994-2002: Member of the Delegation to the Western European Union
- 1994-2002: Member of the Delegation to the NATO Parliamentary Assembly
- 1997-1999: Chairwoman of the Subcommittee on Health of the Council of Europe
- 2003: Chairwoman of the Social, Health and Family Affairs Committee of the Council of Europe

== Decorations ==
- 1994: Awarded the decoration 'Rad A Hlinku I stupňa' (Order of Andrej Hlinka, First Class) in

== See also ==
- 2004 European Parliament election in Slovakia
