= Ján Hudacký =

Slovak politician

Ján Hudacký (born on 24 February 1959 in Vranov nad Topľou) is a Slovak politician and Member of the European Parliament with the Krestansko-demokraticke hnutie, part of the European People's Party and sits on the European Parliament's Committee on Industry, Research and Energy.

He is a substitute for the Committee on Economic and Monetary Affairs, a member of the Delegation for relations with Mercosur and a substitute for the Delegation for relations with Switzerland, Iceland and Norway and to the European Economic Area (EEA) Joint Parliamentary Committee.

== Career ==
- 1978-1993: Košice Technical University, Faculty of Electrical Engineering

== Education ==
- 1991: Management Consulting Institute (Bratislava)
- 1993: Institute of Management for Business (Bratislava)
- 1994: Durham University Business School
- 1998: Georgetown University (Washington, USA)
- 2000: Centre for International Studies (Israel)
- 1990-1992: Marketing professional
- 1992-1993: Head of a business advisory centre
- 1993-2004: Manager of a regional advisory and information centre
- 1998-2002: Member of the Council for Socioeconomic Development
- 1998-2002: Member of the Financial Committee of the town of Prešov
- since 2002: Member of the Business Committee of the town of Prešov
- since 2001: Member of the Financial Committee of Prešov Autonomous Region
- since 2003: Member of the board of directors of the European Association of Regional Development Agencies (EURADA)
- since 1997: Member of the Microfinance Centre for Central and Eastern Europe (Warsaw)
- 1999-2001: President of the Association of Microfinance Institutions of Slovakia
- since 2002: Vice-President of the Association of Christian Entrepreneurs and Managers of Slovakia

== See also ==
- 2004 European Parliament election in Slovakia
