= Milan Gaľa =

Slovak politician

Milan Gaľa (21 January 1953 in Jarovnice – 1 June 2012 near Košice) was a Slovak politician and Member of the European Parliament (MEP) with the Slovenská demokraticka a krestanska unia, part of the European People's Party and sat on the European Parliament's Committee on Culture and Education.

He was a substitute for the Committee on Development and the Committee on the Environment, Public Health and Food Safety. He was also a member of the Delegation for relations with the Gulf States and Yemen.

== Education ==
- 1976: Šafárik University (Košice), Medical Faculty
- 1980: Certificate of postgraduate study, grade one, in stomatology

== Career ==
- since 1976: Stomatologist
- 1994: Chairman of the Prešov district centre of KDH (Christian Democratic Movement)
- 2001: Member of the central council of SDKÚ (Slovak Democratic and Christian Union)
- 1990: Member of the board of Prešov District National Council
- 1990: Deputy Lord Mayor of Lipany
- 1990–2002: Member of Lipany Town Council
- 2001: Member of Prešov Regional Assembly
- 1992: Member of the Federal Assembly of the Czech and Slovak Federative Republic
- 1994–1999: Member of the National Council of the Slovak Republic
- 2002–2004: Member of the National Council of the Slovak Republic, Vice-chairman of the Committee for Health Care

== See also ==
- 2004 European Parliament election in Slovakia
