= Jaroslav Paška =

Slovak politician (1954–2021)

Member of the National Council of Slovakia
- In office 2016–2020
- In office 2006–2009
- In office 1994–2002

Member of the European Parliament
- In office 14 July 2009 – 30 June 2014
- Constituency: Slovakia

Member of the Parliamentary Assembly of the Council of Europe
- In office 2 October 2006 – 28 September 2009
- Constituency: Slovakia

Minister of Education, Science, Research and Sport
- In office 10 November 1993 – 15 March 1994
- Preceded by: Roman Kováč
- Succeeded by: Ľubomír Harach

Personal details
- Born: 20 June 1954 Banská Štiavnica, Czechoslovakia
- Died: 15 July 2021 (aged 67)
- Party: SNS

Jaroslav Paška (20 June 1954 – 15 July 2021) was a Slovak politician. A member of the Slovak National Party (SNS), he served in the National Council of Slovakia from 1994 to 2002, 2006 to 2009, and 2016 to 2020. He also served in the European Parliament from 2009 to 2014, during which he was a member of Europe of Freedom and Direct Democracy. Prior to serving in politics, he had a career as an architect and spoke French and Russian. He had begun serving as Vice-President of the SNS in 1999.
