= 2014 European Parliament election in Slovakia =

Third european election in Slovakia

- 24 May 2014

All 13 Slovak seats to the European Parliament
- Turnout: 576,437 (13.05%) ▼6.58 pp
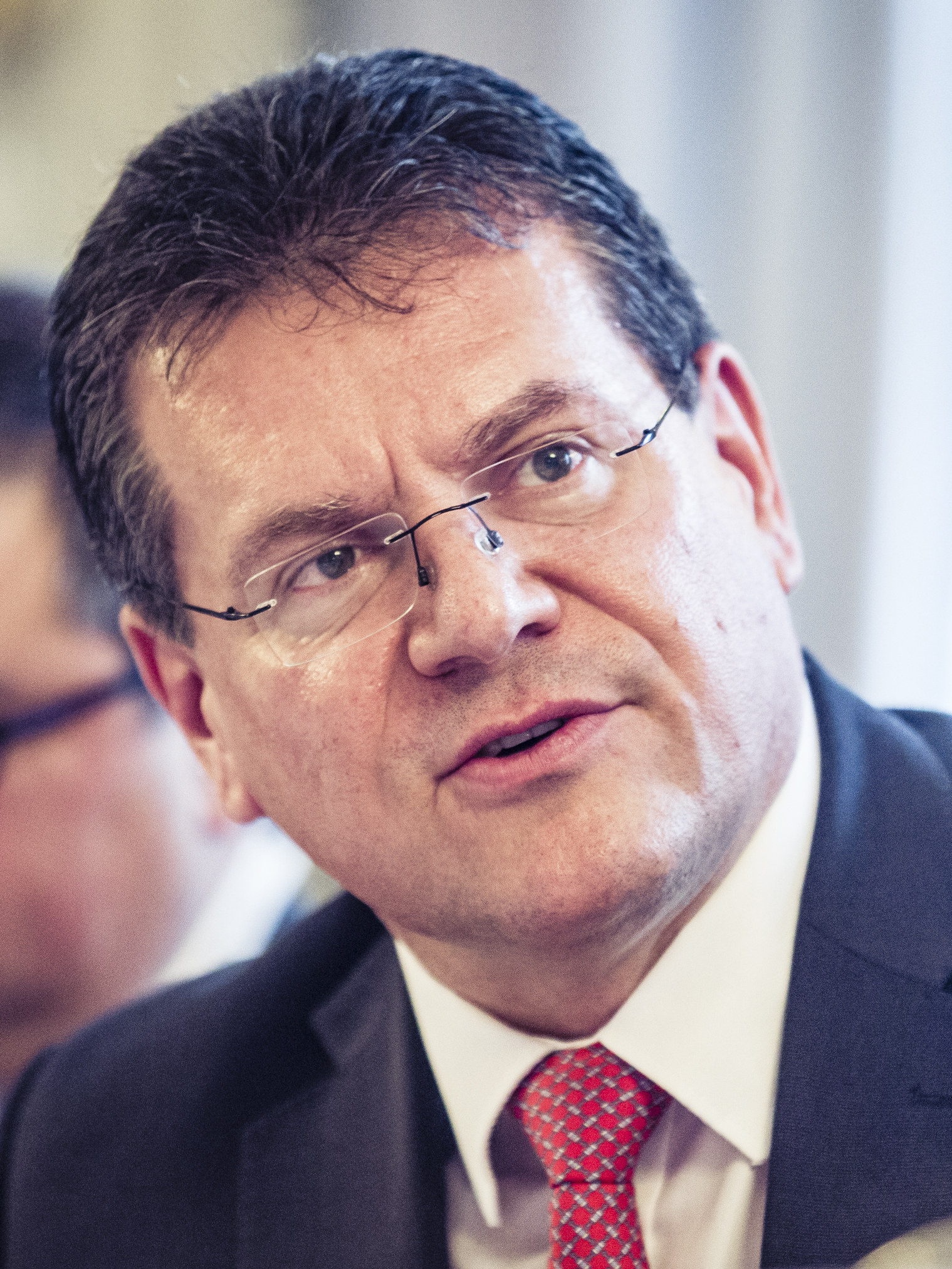

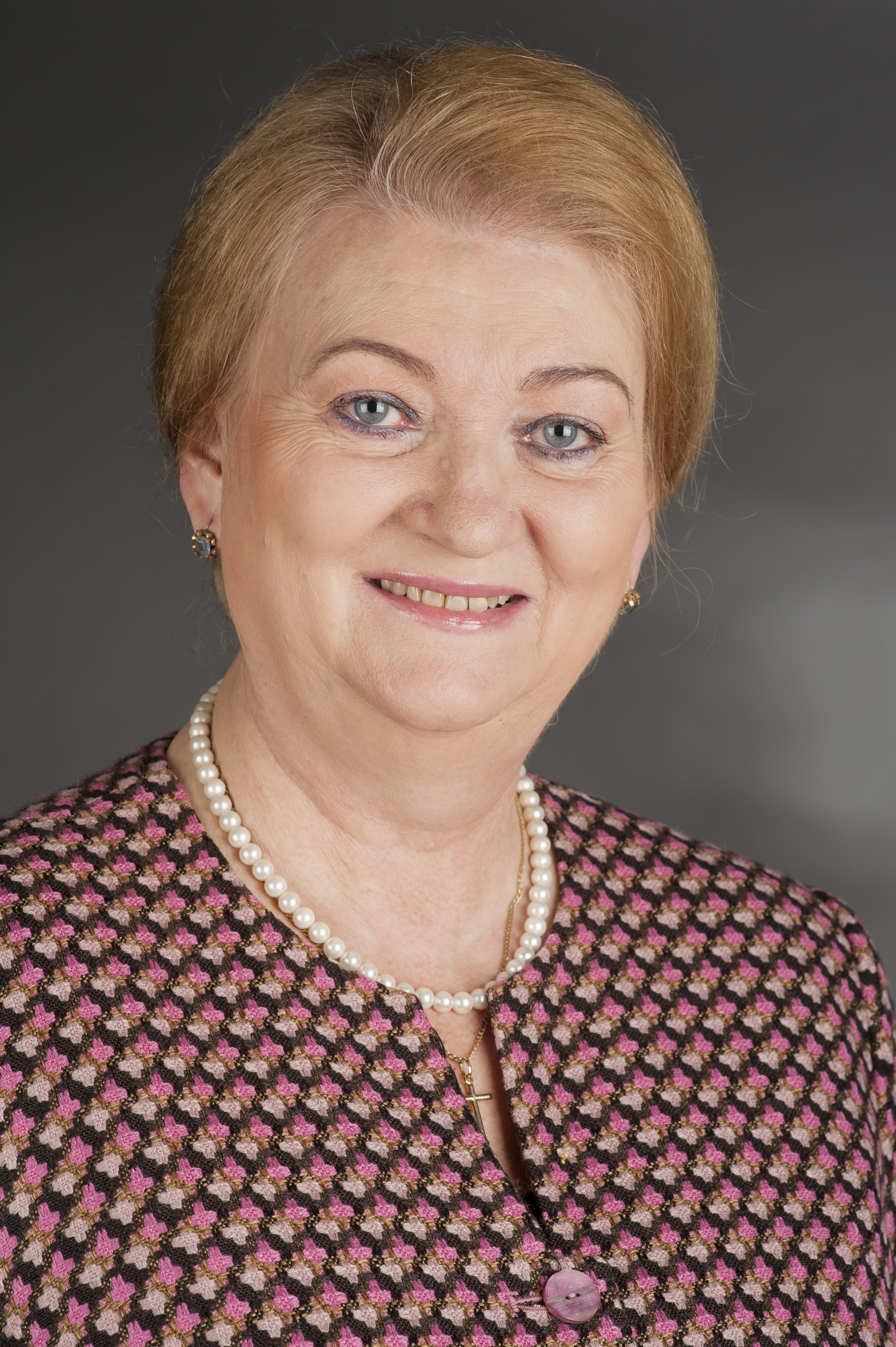

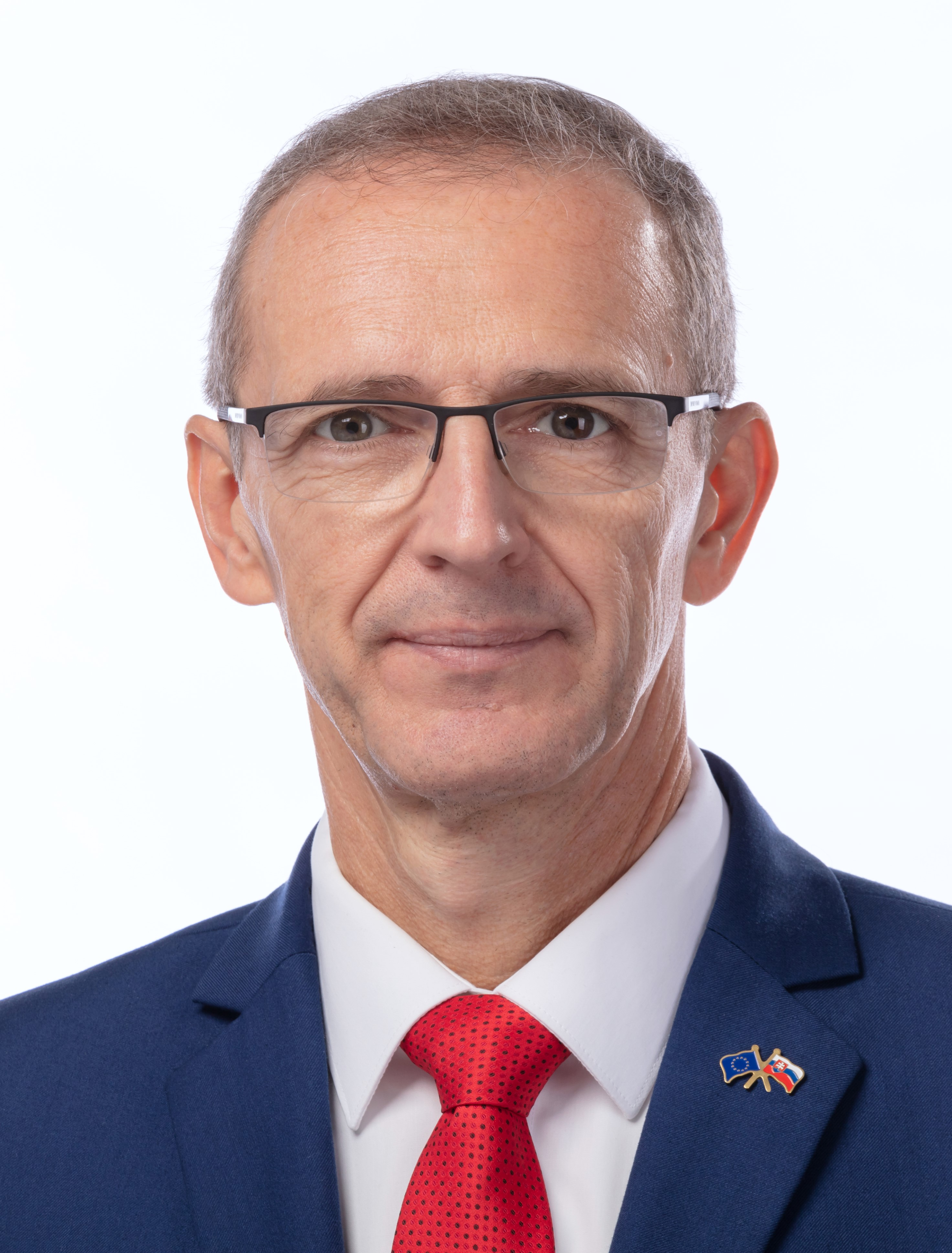

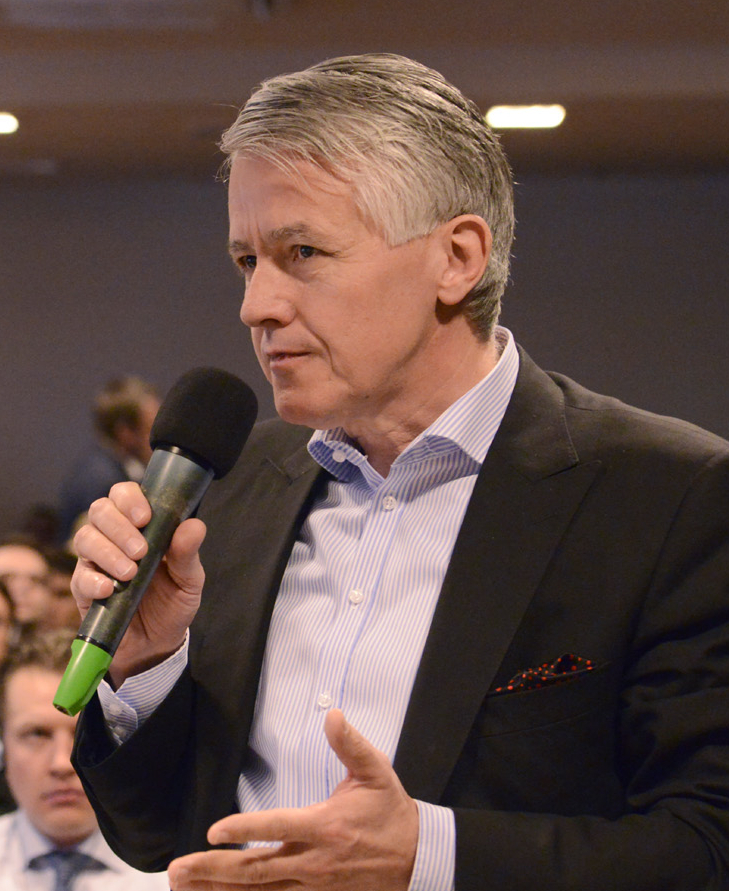

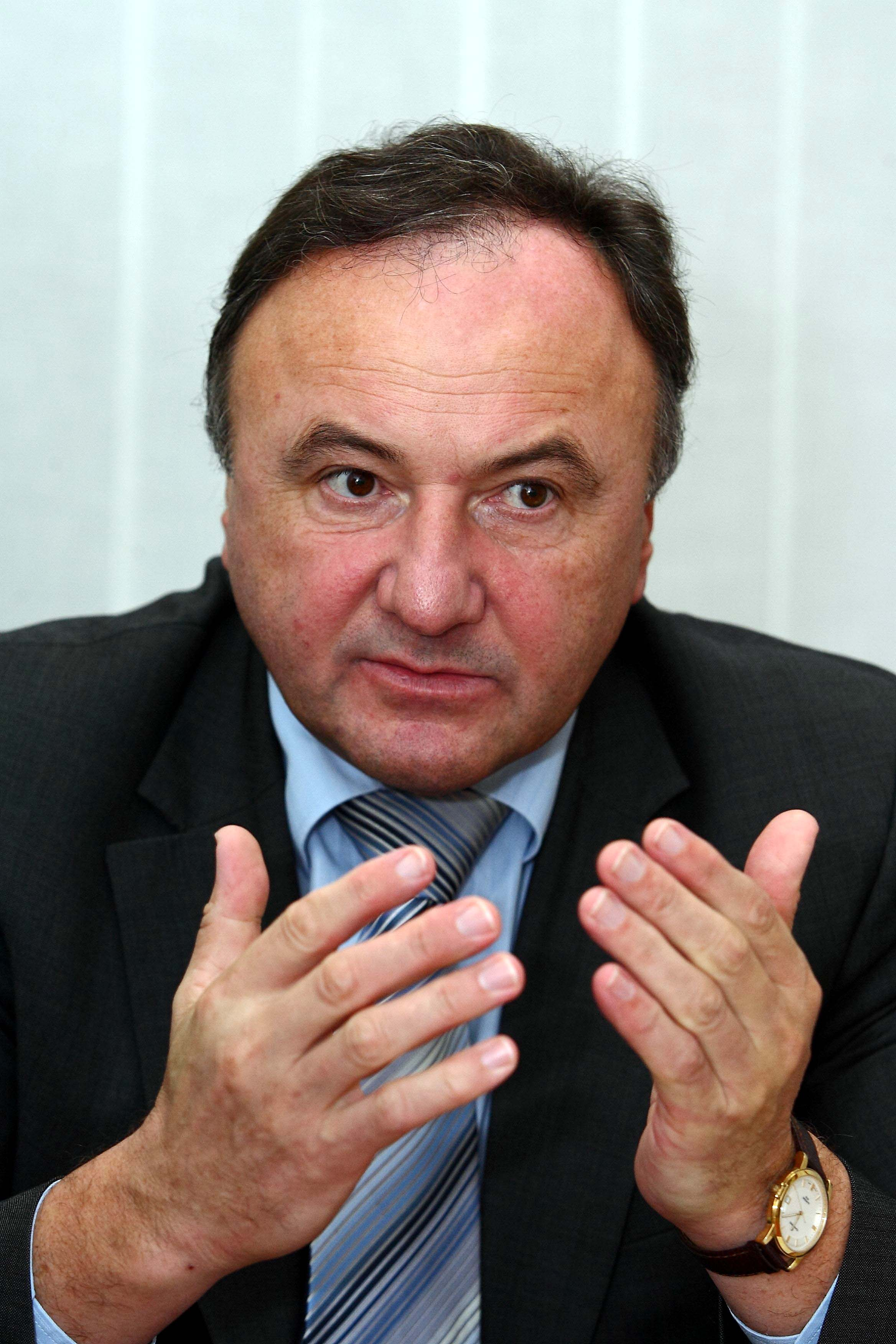

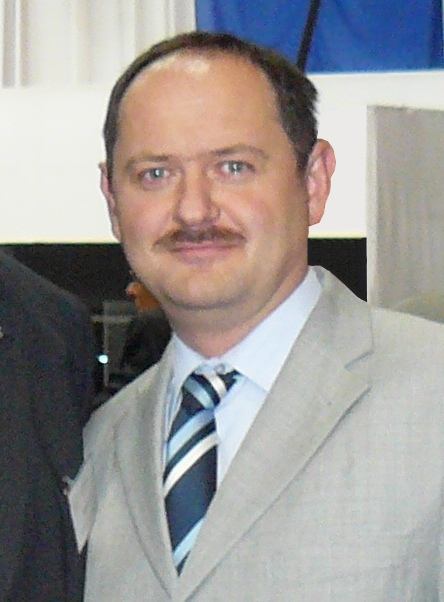
| | First party | Second party | Third party |
|---|---|---|---|
| Leader | Maroš Šefčovič | Anna Záborská | Ivan Štefanec |
| Party | Smer-SD | KDH | SDKÚ–DS |
| Alliance | S&D | EPP | EPP |
| Last election | 5 seats, 32.01% | 2 seats, 10.87% | 2 seats, 16.98% |
| Seats won | 4 | 2 | 2 |
| Seat change | ▼1 | 0 | 0 |
| Popular vote | 135,089 | 74,108 | 43,467 |
| Percentage | 24.10% | 13.22% | 7.75% |
| Swing | ▼7.92 | ▲2.35 | ▼9.23 |
| | Fourth party | Fifth party | Sixth party |
| Leader | Jozef Viskupič | Jozef Kollár | Ján Oravec |
| Party | OĽaNO | NOVA-KDS-OKS | SaS |
| Alliance | ECR | ECR | ALDE |
| Last election | – | 0 seats, 2.1% | 0 seats, 4.71% |
| Seats won | 1 | 1 | 1 |
| Seat change | New | ▲1 | ▲1 |
| Popular vote | 41,829 | 38,316 | 37,376 |
| Percentage | 7.46% | 6.83% | 6.67% |
| Swing | New | ▲4.73 | ▲1.95 |
| | Seventh party | Eighth party |
| Leader | Pál Csáky | Zsolt Simon |
| Party | SMK | Most–Híd |
| Alliance | EPP | EPP |
| Last election | 2 seats, 11.33% | – |
| Seats won | 1 | 1 |
| Seat change | ▼1 | New |
| Popular vote | 36,629 | 32,708 |
| Percentage | 6.53% | 5.83% |
| Swing | ▼4.81 | New |

Elections to the European Parliament took place in Slovakia on 24 May 2014. It was the third European election which took place in Slovakia.

Thirteen MEPs were elected from Slovakia using a proportional list system joining the other candidates elected as part of the wider 2014 European Parliament election

The 'faster processing of interim results' was promised by the Slovak Office for Statistics because of a new electronic counting system.

Turnout, at 13% of registered voters, was the lowest across the EU.

== Main contesting parties ==
| Name | | Ideology | Leader |
|---|---|---|---|
| Smer-SD | Direction – Social Democracy; Smer - sociálna demokracia | Social democracy | Robert Fico |
| KDH | Christian Democratic Movement; Kresťanskodemokratické hnutie | Christian democracy | Ján Figeľ |
| SDKÚ-DS | Slovak Democratic and Christian Union – Democratic Party; Slovenská demokratická a kresťanská únia - Demokratická strana | Conservative liberalism | Pavol Frešo |
| OĽaNO | Ordinary People and Independent Personalities; Obyčajní ľudia a nezávislé osobnosti | Populism | Igor Matovič |
| NOVA-KDS-OKS | New Majority-Conservative Democrats of Slovakia-Civic Conservative Party; Nová väčšina - Konzervatívni demokrati Slovenska - Občianska konzervatívna strana | Conservatism | Daniel Lipšic; Vladimír Palko; Ondrej Dostál |
| SaS | Freedom and Solidarity; Sloboda a Solidarita | Liberalism | Richard Sulík |
| SMK-MKP | Party of the Hungarian Community; Strana maďarskej komunity - Magyar Közösség Pártja | Hungarian minority interests | József Berényi |
| M-H | Bridge; Most-Híd | Liberal conservatism | Béla Bugár |
| TIP | We Make Different Politics; Tvoríme inú politiku | Liberalism | Tomáš Hudec |
| SNS | Slovak National Party; Slovenská národná strana | National conservatism | Andrej Danko |

== Results ==
| Party | Votes | % | +/– | Seats | +/– |
|---|---|---|---|---|---|
| Direction – Social Democracy | 135,089 | 24.10 | –7.92 | 4 | –1 |
| Christian Democratic Movement | 74,108 | 13.22 | +2.35 | 2 | 0 |
| Slovak Democratic and Christian Union – Democratic Party | 43,467 | 7.75 | –9.23 | 2 | 0 |
| Ordinary People and Independent Personalities | 41,829 | 7.46 | New | 1 | New |
| NOVA–Conservative Democrats–OKS | 38,316 | 6.83 | +4.72 | 1 | +1 |
| Freedom and Solidarity | 37,376 | 6.67 | +1.95 | 1 | +1 |
| Party of the Hungarian Community | 36,629 | 6.53 | –4.81 | 1 | –1 |
| Most–Híd | 32,708 | 5.83 | New | 1 | New |
| Strana TIP - Tvoríme Inú Politiku | 20,730 | 3.70 | New | 0 | New |
| Slovak National Party | 20,244 | 3.61 | –1.05 | 0 | –1 |
| People's Party Our Slovakia | 9,749 | 1.74 | New | 0 | New |
| Law and Justice | 9,322 | 1.66 | New | 0 | New |
| Communist Party of Slovakia | 8,510 | 1.52 | –0.13 | 0 | 0 |
| Party of Democratic Slovakia | 8,378 | 1.49 | –7.49 | 0 | –1 |
| Nation and Justice – Our Party | 7,763 | 1.38 | New | 0 | New |
| Magnificat Slovakia | 6,646 | 1.19 | New | 0 | New |
| European Democratic Party | 3,739 | 0.67 | New | 0 | New |
| Christian Slovak National Party | 3,631 | 0.65 | New | 0 | New |
| Party of Modern Slovakia | 2,851 | 0.51 | New | 0 | New |
| Dawn | 2,773 | 0.49 | New | 0 | New |
| 7 Statočných Regionálna Strana Slovenska | 2,696 | 0.48 | New | 0 | New |
| Green Party | 2,623 | 0.47 | New | 0 | New |
| Slovak People's Party | 2,590 | 0.46 | New | 0 | New |
| Direct Democracy–Christian People's Party | 2,405 | 0.43 | New | 0 | New |
| VZDOR | 1,769 | 0.32 | New | 0 | New |
| Civic Left Party | 1,311 | 0.23 | New | 0 | New |
| Democratic Civil Party | 1,273 | 0.23 | New | 0 | New |
| Hungarian Christian Democratic Alliance | 1,170 | 0.21 | New | 0 | New |
| New Parliament | 900 | 0.16 | New | 0 | New |
| Total | 560,595 | 100.00 | – | 13 | 0 |
| Valid votes | 560,603 | 97.25 | | | |
| Invalid/blank votes | 15,834 | 2.75 | | | |
| Total votes | 576,437 | 100.00 | | | |
| Registered voters/turnout | 4,414,433 | 13.06 | | | |
Source: Statistics.sk

Popular vote
| SMER-SD | 24.10% |
| KDH | 13.22% |
| SDKÚ-DS | 7.75% |
| OĽaNO | 7.46% |
| NOVA-KDS-OKS | 6.83% |
| SaS | 6.67% |
| SMK-MKP | 6.53% |
| M-H | 5.83% |
| TIP | 3.70% |
| SNS | 3.61% |

== Elected deputies ==
Winning party left-wing populist Smer-SD won 4 seats (Monika Beňová, Vladimír Maňka, Monika Smolková, Boris Zala, leader of Smer-SD in this election - Maroš Šefčovič became again European commissioner from Slovakia), Christian democratic KDH with 2 seats (Anna Záborská, Miroslav Mikolášik ), also liberal conservatives from SDKÚ-DS had 2 seats (Eduard Kukan, Ivan Štefanec), and 1 seats won conservative coalition NOVA-KDS-OKS (Jana Žitňanská, leader of united list of conservatives was Jozef Kollár but he wasn't elect), populist OĽaNO (Branislav Škripek, leader of list OĽaNO was Jozef Viskupič but he wasn't elect), liberal SaS (Richard Sulík, Ján Oravec as leader of list SaS wasn't elect), Hungarian minority conservative party SMK-MKP (Pál Csáky) and also Hungarian minority but more liberal and anti-Orbán party Most-Híd (József Nagy, Zsolt Simon as leader wasn't elect).

Slovakia (14)
| Monika Beňová | S&D |
| Vladimír Maňka | S&D |
| Monika Smolková | S&D |
| Boris Zala | S&D |
| Anna Záborská | EPP |
| Miroslav Mikolášik | EPP |
| Ivan Štefanec | EPP |
| Eduard Kukan | EPP |
| Branislav Škripek | ECR |
| Jana Žitňanská | ECR |
| Richard Sulík | ALDE |
| Pál Csáky | EPP |
| József Nagy | EPP |

By European parliamentary group:

| EPP | S&D | ALDE | ECR | G–EFA | GUE/NGL | EFDD | Non-inscrits |
|---|---|---|---|---|---|---|---|
| 6 | 4 | 1 | 2 | 0 | 0 | 0 | 0 |
