= Peter Baco =

Slovak politician (born 1945)

Peter Baco (born 9 April 1945; Opatová, Lučenec) is a Slovak politician and former Member of the European Parliament with the People's Party – Movement for a Democratic Slovakia, and was therefore a Non-Inscrit in the European Parliament.

He sits on its Committee on Agriculture and Rural Development, and is a substitute for the Committee on Regional Development and a member of the Delegation to the EU-Croatia Joint Parliamentary Committee.

== Decorations ==
- Holder of the Order of Ľudovít Štúr
- FAO Silver Medal
- Departmental award of the Ministry of Agriculture of the Slovak Republic
