= Sergej Kozlík =

Slovak politician (born 1950)

Member of the European Parliament
- In office 20 July 2004 – 30 June 2014

Member of the National Council of the Slovak Republic
- In office 14 January 1998 – 20 July 2004
- In office 14 March 1994 – 13 December 1994

Minister of Finance of Slovakia
- In office 13 December 1994 – 14 January 1998
- Prime Minister: Vladimír Mečiar
- Preceded by: Rudolf Filkus
- Succeeded by: Miroslav Maxon

Deputy Prime Minister of Slovakia for Economy
- In office 10 November 1993 – 14 March 1994

Personal details
- Born: 27 July 1950 (age 75) Bratislava, Czechoslovakia
- Party: People's Party – Movement for a Democratic Slovakia, (EP – ALDE) (–2014); National Coalition / Independent Candidates
- Education: University of Economics in Bratislava

Sergej Kozlík (born 27 July 1950 in Bratislava) is a Slovak politician, who had served as the Minister of Finance of Slovakia, Member of the European Parliament and MP of the Slovak parliament.

He sat on its Committee on Budgets, and is a substitute for the Committee on Economic and Monetary Affairs and a member of the Delegation to the ACP-EU Joint Parliamentary Assembly.

== See also ==
- 2004 European Parliament election in Slovakia
