= Vladimír Maňka =

Slovak politician

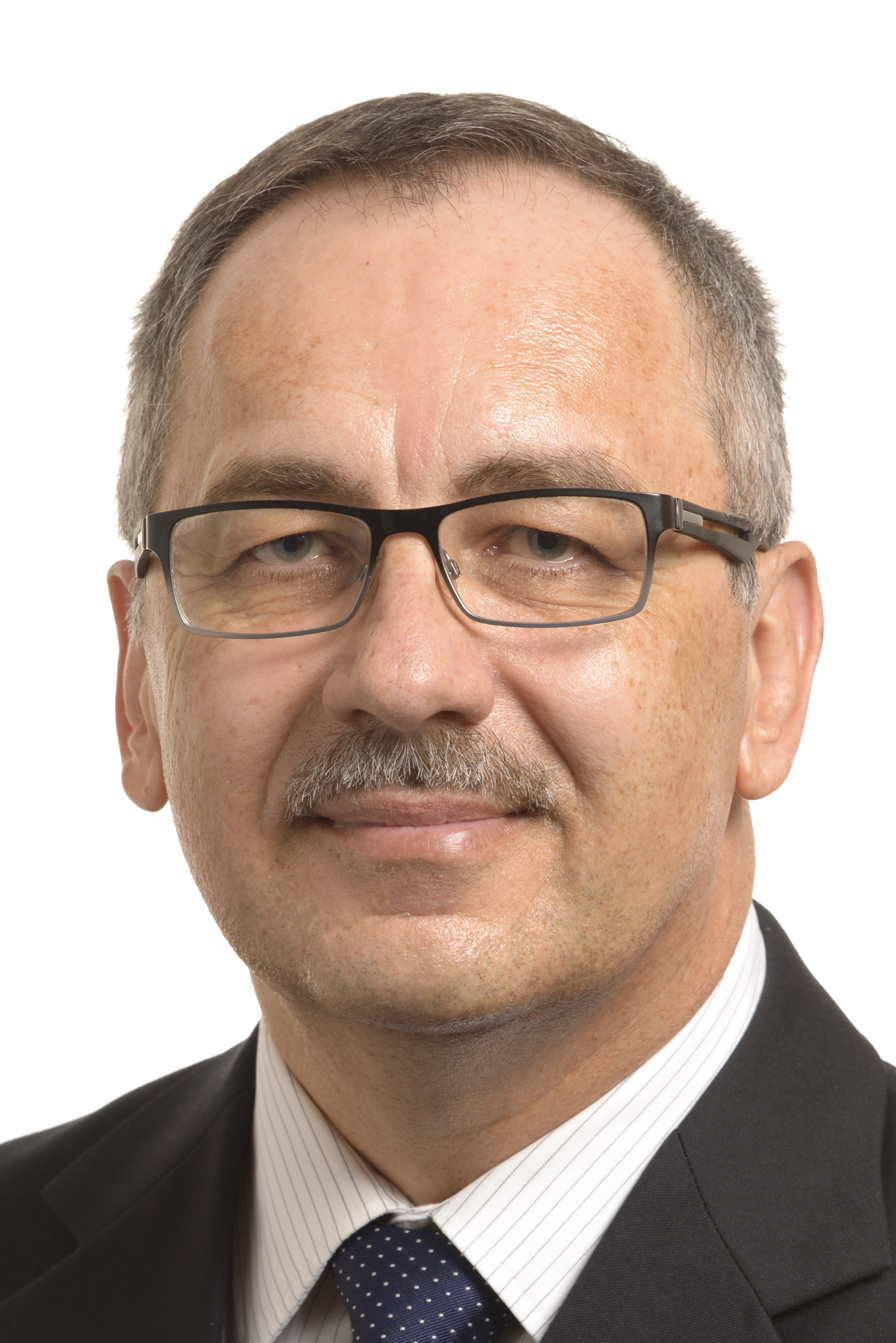

Member of the European Parliament
- In office 2004–2019

Personal details
- Born: 19 September 1959 (age 66) Lučenec, Slovakia
- Party: Slovak: Direction; EU: Party of European Socialists

Vladimír Maňka (born 19 September 1959) is a Slovak politician and Member of the European Parliament (2004–2019) with the Direction, part of the Socialist Group.

In parliament, Maňka sits on the European Parliament's Committee on Budgets. He is a substitute for the Committee on Economic and Monetary Affairs, substitute for the Delegation for relations with the countries of Southeast Asia and the Association of Southeast Asian Nations (ASEAN).

In January 2017, Maňka was elected as quaestor of the European Parliament for two and a half years. His role as quaestor made him part of the Parliament's leadership under President Antonio Tajani.

== Career ==
- 1978–1983: Slovak University of Technology (Bratislava), Faculty of Civil Engineering
- 1995–1998: City University (Bratislava)
- 1983–1992: Detva heavy engineering works
- 1992–1998: Manager of a commercial company
- 1995–1998: Chairman of the economic council of SDĽ (Party of the Democratic Left)
- 1996–1998: Head of the economy section
- since 2003: Deputy Chairman of SDĽ
- 1997–1998: Member of the finance committee
- since 1999: Lord Mayor of Zvolen
- 2002–2004: Chairman of the board of the Banská Bystrica regional development agency

== Education ==
- Member of the National Council of the Slovak Republic
- Vice-chairman of the Committee for Finance, the Budget and Currency
- Member of the Committee for European Integration
- 1998–2002: Member of the EU-Slovak Republic Joint Parliamentary Committee
- 1998–2002: Vice-chairman of the academic senate of City University (Bratislava)
- since 2003: Chairman of the board of directors of Zvolen Technical University
- 2002: Holder of the 'Cena mesta Banská Bystrica' (City of Banská Bystrica Award)

== See also ==
- 2004 European Parliament election in Slovakia
