= Boris Zala =

Slovak politician

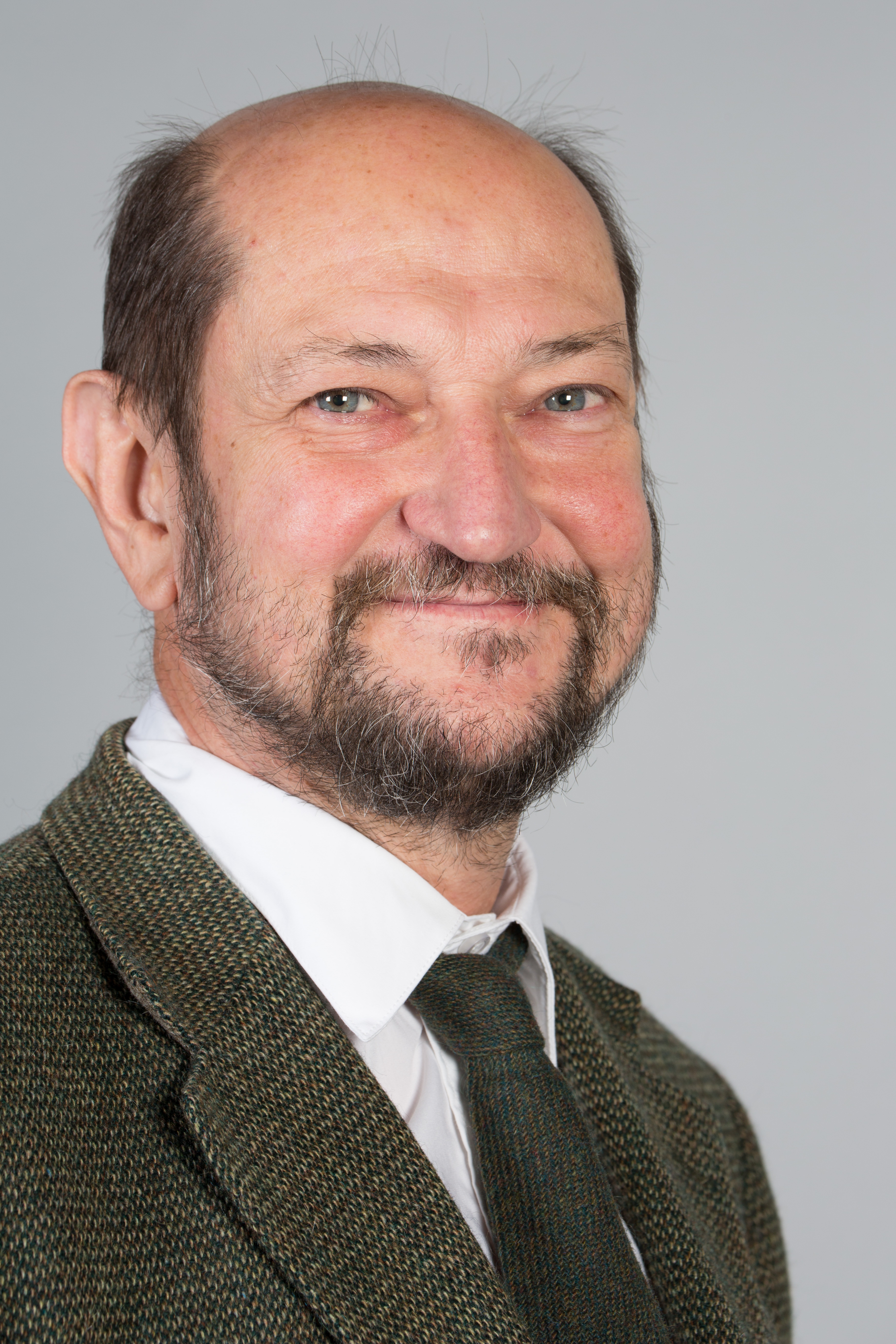

Member of the European Parliament for Slovakia
- In office 20 July 2004 – 2 July 2019

Member of the National Council of the Slovak Republic
- In office 15 October 2002 – 20 July 2004

Personal details
- Born: 9 December 1954 (age 71) Zlaté Moravce, Czechoslovakia
- Party: SDSS (1990–2000); SMER-SD (2000–2016)
- Education: Comenius University

Boris Zala (born 9 December 1954) is a Slovak politician for the parliamentary party SMER-SD, a member of the Slovak parliament, and former Chairman of the parliament's Foreign Affairs Committee. He is also Assistant Professor at Constantine the Philosopher University (UKF) in Nitra, Columnist, Chair of the Political Science, and European Studies Department at UKF's Faculty of Philosophy.

== Education and Professional Career ==
Zala graduated from the Faculty of Philosophy of the Comenius University in Bratislava in 1979. After graduation, he proceeded with his study of philosophy and received his PhD degree (1981) and CSc degree (1995) from the same university.

In 1981, he worked as a journalist at Slovak Radio but was forced to quit the job due to political persecution and seek employment in various manual worker professions before he eventually managed to get a research job at the Social Development and Labour Research Institute in Bratislava in 1984.

In 1990, he became head of the Secretariat of the Speaker of Slovak parliament and Lecturer in Philosophy at Comenius University, Bratislava.

Since 2000, he has been Chair of the Political Science and European Studies Department at UKF's Faculty of Philosophy in the western Slovak city of Nitra. He is the author of six philosophy, political science, and history monographs and has written dozens of research studies and papers dealing with social science issues. As a media analyst and political commentator, he wrote hundreds of political analyses for the Slovak press and participated in or co-authored several media projects at Slovak Television (STV) and Slovak Radio (SRo).

In 1988–89, Zala took an active part in organizing protest activities against the Communist regime and was one of the co-founders of Public Against Violence (VPN) – a broad civic movement established by democratic activists with the view of putting the country back on democratic track within the framework of the Velvet Revolution of 1989.

== Political and Parliamentary Career ==
Zala became a Member of Parliament in 1990, shortly after democracy had been restored in the wake of Communist rule's collapse in November 1989. During his first term in parliament, he was President of the Social Democratic Party, Chairman of the Defence and Security Committee of the Slovak parliament, and member of the supreme legislative body's Presidium.

In 1992, he vacated his post as Social Democratic Party President, to enable Alexander Dubček to assume that function.

In 1999, he became a co-founder and Vice-Chairman of the left-wing political party, Smer-sociálna demokracia (Direction-Social Democracy). He was elected a Member of Parliament for the second time in 2002 and re-elected again in the 2006 parliamentary elections.

From 2002 to 2006, he sat on the parliament's Foreign Affairs Committee and the Special Oversight Committee for the Slovak Intelligence Service. After Smer-SD's victory in the 2006 elections, Zala was elected Chairman of the Slovak parliament's Foreign Affairs Committee and took over as head of the Slovak parliamentary delegation to the Parliamentary Assembly of the Council of Europe.

As of 2019, Zala is serving his 8th parliamentary term. Until July 2019, he was a member of the Group of the Progressive Alliance of Socialists and Democrats in the European Parliament, part of the SMER-Sociálna demokracia (Slovakia) national party, and Vice Chair of the Delegation for relations with South Africa.

== Sources ==
- Boris Zala (in Slovak)
