= Monika Smolková =

Slovak politician

Monika Smolková MEP
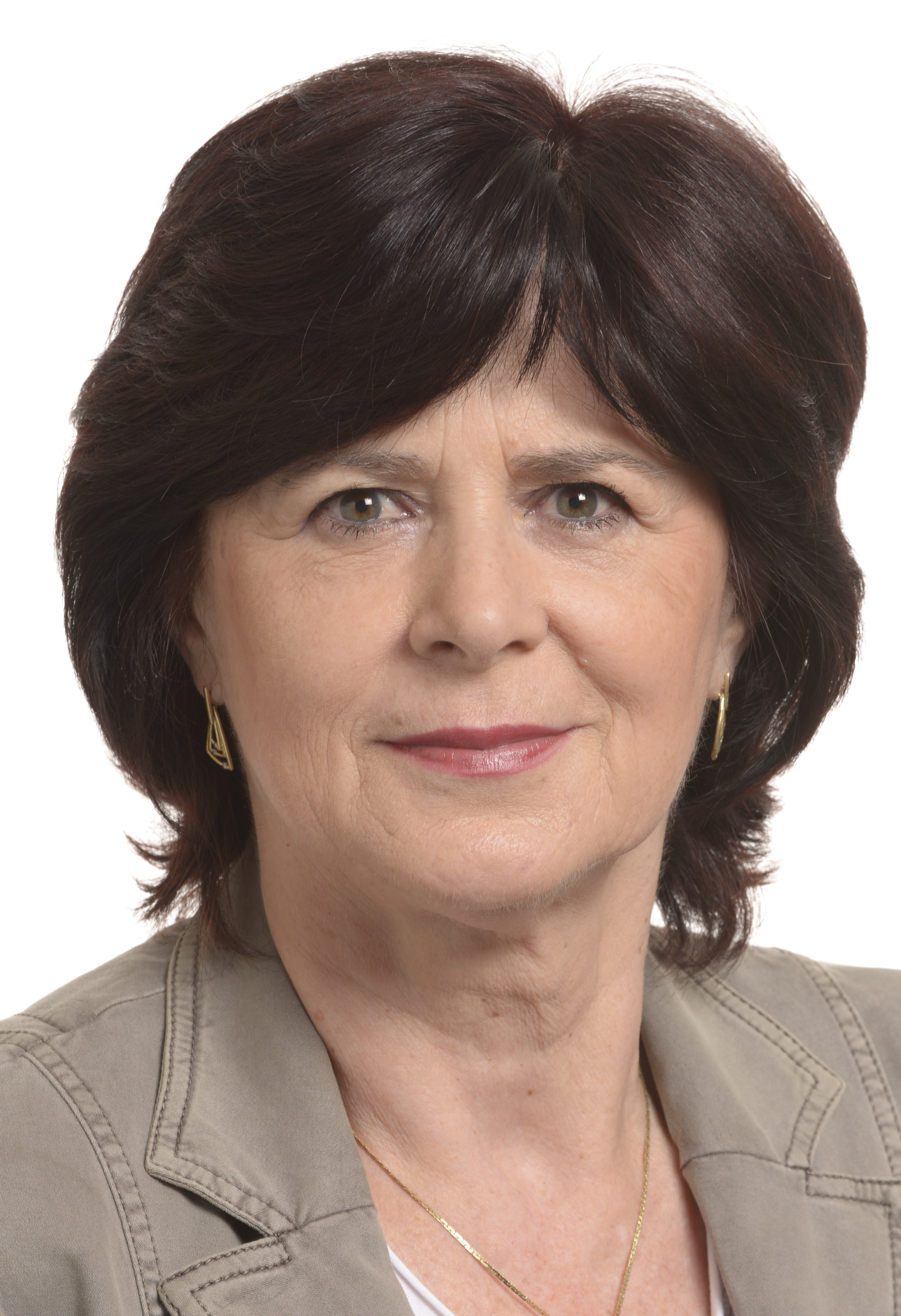

Personal details
- Born: 6 October 1956 (age 69) Janovík, Czechoslovakia (now Slovakia)
- Party: Direction – Social Democracy
- Occupation: Politician
- Website: Monika Smolková MEP

Monika Smolková (born 6 October 1956) is a Slovak politician. Since 2009 she has been a Member of the European Parliament, where she is a member of the Progressive Alliance of Socialists and Democrats (S&D). Smolková has held various positions within public office in Slovakia including being elected a member of the National Council in 2006.
