= Miroslav Mikolášik =

Slovak politician

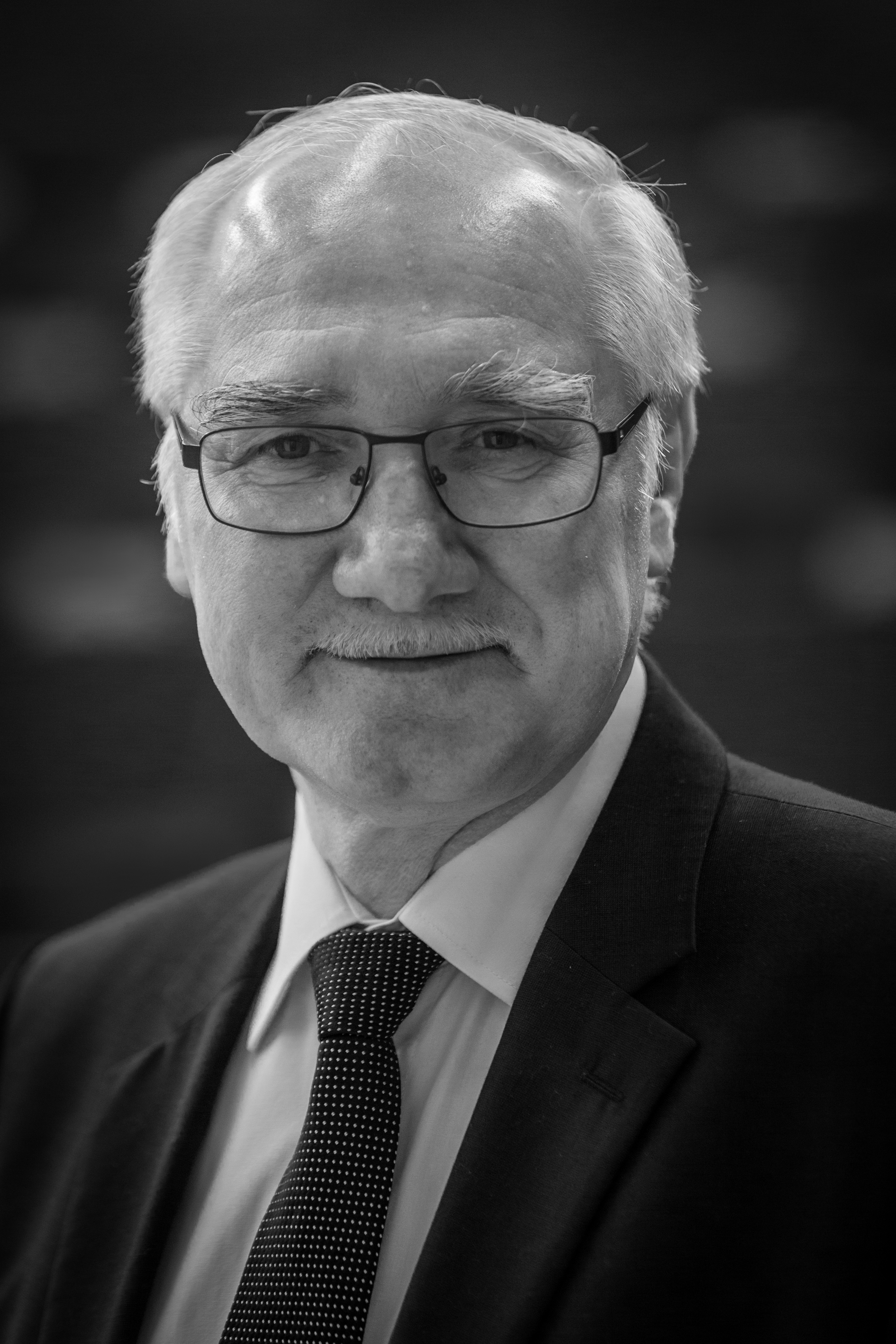
Miroslav Mikolášik (2015)

Miroslav Mikolášik (born 11 September 1952 in Dolný Kubín) is a Slovak politician and Member of the European Parliament (MEP) with the Christian Democratic Movement (KDH), part of the European People's Party and sits on the European Parliament's Committee on Regional Development.

Mikolášik is a substitute for the Committee on the Environment, Public Health and Food Safety, a member of the delegation to the Euro-Mediterranean Parliamentary Assembly and a substitute for the delegation for relations with Israel. In addition to his committee assignments, he is also a supporter of the MEP Heart Group, a group of parliamentarians who have an interest in promoting measures that will help reduce the burden of cardiovascular diseases (CVD).

He still lives in Dolný Kubín along with his wife. He has four children; three sons and one daughter.

== Education ==
- 1972–1978: Charles' University (Prague), Medical Faculty
- 1982: Certificate of postgraduate study in anaesthesiology and reanimation
- 1984: Certificate of postgraduate study in general medicine

== Career ==
- since 1978: Doctor at an anaesthesiological and resuscitation department
- since 1994: General practitioner
- 1991–1992: External teacher at the Institute of Medical Ethics and Bioethics (Bratislava)
- 1990–1991: Vice-Chairman of a District National Committee (Dolný Kubín)
- 1991–1992: Head of the Department for International Relations at the Ministry of Health of the Slovak Republic
- 1992–1994: Chairman of KDH (Christian Democratic Movement) (Orava region)
- 1994–1998: Member of the National Council of the Slovak Republic for KDH
- 1998–1999: Member of the National Council of the Slovak Republic for SDK (Slovak Democratic Coalition) /KDH
- 1994–1998: Member of the Committee on Social Affairs and Health Care
- 1995–1998: Member of the EU-Slovak Republic Joint Parliamentary Committee
- 1998–1999: Member of the Foreign Affairs Committee of the National Council of the Slovak Republic
- 1999–2002: Ambassador Extraordinary and Plenipotentiary of the Slovak Republic to Canada
- President of the citizens' association 'Donum Vitae'

== See also ==
- 2004 European Parliament election in Slovakia
