= Edit Bauer =

Slovak politician

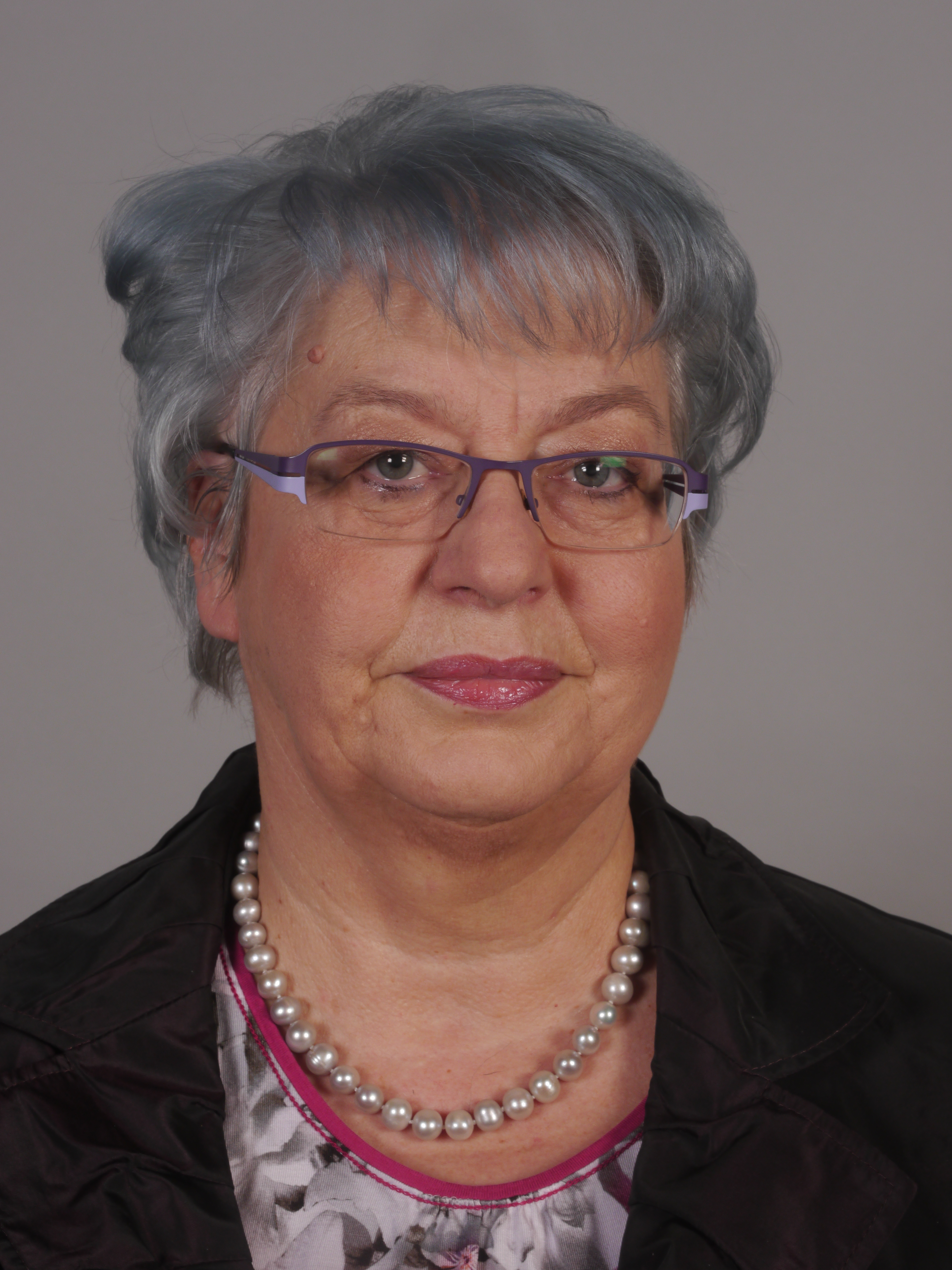
Bauer in 2014

Edit Bauer (born 30 August 1946) is a Slovak politician of Hungarian ethnicity and Member of the European Parliament (MEP).

== Life ==
She was born on 30 August 1946 in Šamorín, Czechoslovakia. She is a member of the Magyar Koalíció Pártja, part of the European People's Party and she sits on the European Parliament's Committee on Civil Liberties, Justice and Home Affairs and its Committee on Women's Rights and Gender Equality.

Bauer is a substitute for the Committee on Employment and Social Affairs and a member of the Delegation to the EU-Romania Joint Parliamentary Committee.

== Education ==
- 1968: University of Economics, Bratislava
- 1980: Slovak Academy of Sciences, PhD

== Career ==
- 1968-1969: Slovak Cooperatives Committee
- 1969-1984: Standard of Living Research Institute
- 1984-1990: Employment and Social Research Institute
- 1990-1998: Slovak Academy of Sciences (part-time
- 1990-1992: Member of Parliament - National Council of the Slovak Republic (1990-1998) - Chairwoman of the Scientific Subcommittee
- 1998-2002: Undersecretary of State, Employment, Social and Family Affairs Ministry
- Member of Parliament - National Council of the Slovak Republic (2002-2004) - in addition to which
- Member of the European Integration Committee
- Member of the Slovak delegation to the Parliamentary Assembly of the Council of Europe
- 2003-2004: observer at the European Parliament
- 1990-1998: Member of the board, 'Együttélés' (Coexistence)
- since 1998: Vice-Chairwoman with responsibility for social policy, SMK-MKP party
- 2000: Vice-President of the 88th session of the ILO

== See also ==
- 2004 European Parliament election in Slovakia
