= Anna Záborská =

Slovak politician (1948–2025)

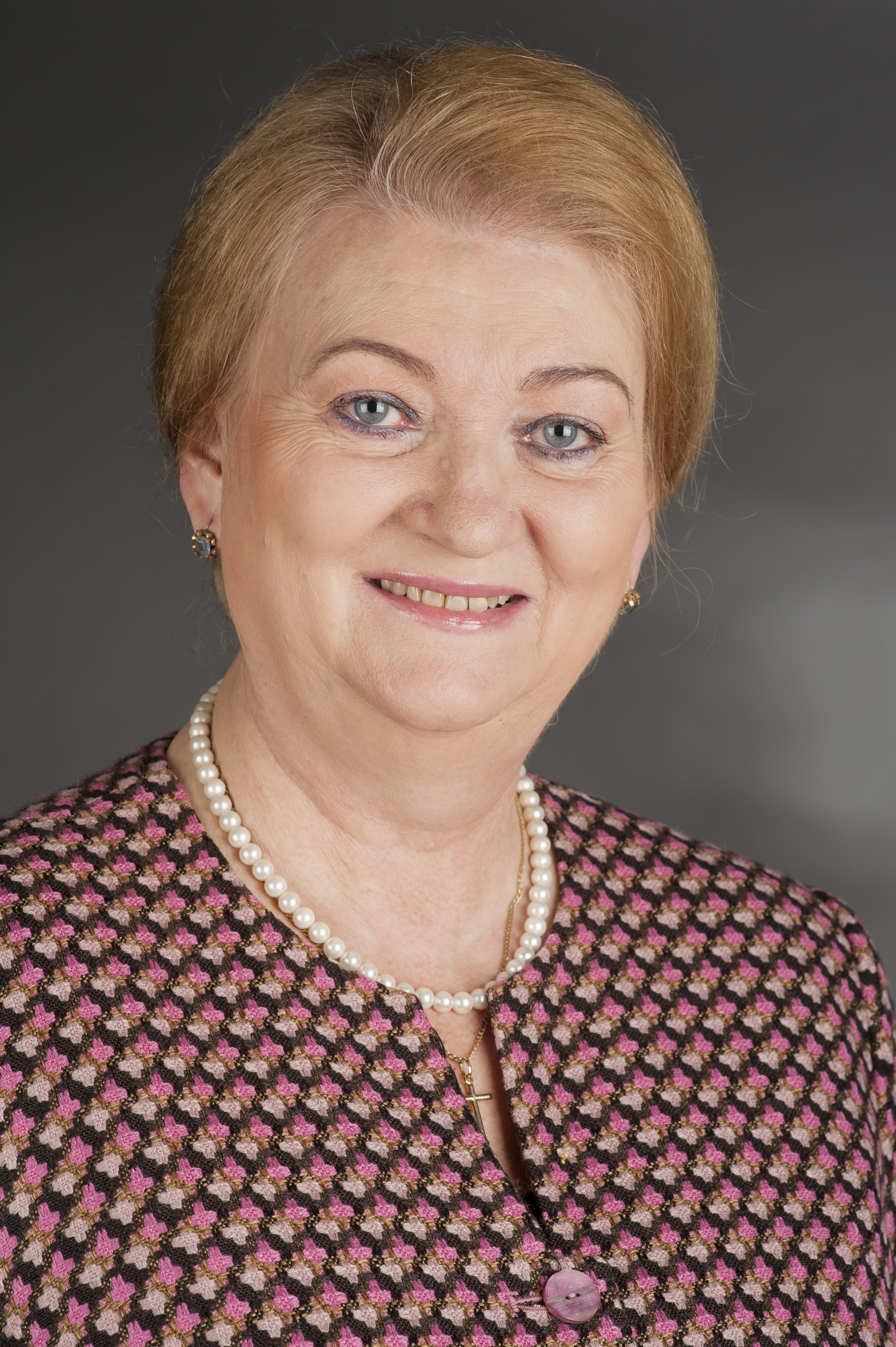
- Záborská in 2014

Chair of Christian Union
- In office 8 February 2019 – 26 October 2024
- Preceded by: Party established
- Succeeded by: Milan Krajniak

Member of the National Council
- In office 21 March 2020 – 20 August 2025

Member of the European Parliament for Slovakia
- In office 1 July 2004 – 1 July 2019

Personal details
- Born: 7 June 1948 Zürich, Switzerland
- Died: 20 August 2025 (aged 77) Bratislava, Slovakia
- Citizenship: Slovakia
- Party: KÚ (2019–2025)
- Other political affiliations: KDH (1993–2019)
- Spouse: Vladimír Záborský
- Children: 2
- Education: Comenius University
- Website: Anna Zaborska MEP

Anna Záborská (7 June 1948 – 20 August 2025) was a Slovak politician of the Christian Union who was a member of the National Council from 2020 until her death in 2025. From 2004 to 2019 she was a Member of the European Parliament, where she was a member of the Group of the European People's Party (EPP).

== Background ==
=== Early life and education ===
Anna Záborská was born on 7 June 1948 in Zürich. Her family returned to Czechoslovakia when she was one year old. Her ancestors from the father's side were Jewish, including several Holocaust victims. Her father, Anton Neuwirth was a medical doctor and Catholic Action activist, who was imprisoned for his activities in Communist Czechoslovakia. After the Velvet Revolution Neuwirth became a Member of Parliament and one of the founders of the Christian Democratic Movement as well as a leading conservative intellectual. From 1966 to 1972 she studied medicine at the Comenius University (Univerzita Komenského) in Martin, Slovakia (Turčiansky Svätý Martin).

=== Family ===
On 10 July 1972, she married the architect Vladimír Záborský; together they had two children.

=== Medical doctor ===
From 1972 to 1998, she worked as a medical doctor in Žilina, Béjaïa (Algeria) and Prievidza.

=== Death ===
Záborská died on 20 August 2025, at the age of 77, after suffering from long-term health problems.

== Political career ==
In the Christian Democratic Movement (KDH) she served from 1999 to 2000 as vice-president for international relations. From 1998 to 2004 she was a member of the Slovak National Parliament "National Council" (Národná rada), where she worked primarily in the EU-Slovakia Joint Parliamentary Committee, which prepared the Slovak EU membership in 2004.

In 2019, she and Branislav Škripek created the Kresťanská únia (Christian Union) party.

=== European Parliament ===
In 2003 she was nominated as an observer in the European Parliament (EP). In 2004 she was elected as Member of the European Parliament, where she was elected President of the EP Committee on Women's Rights and Gender Equality (2004-2009). During that legislature, she was a member of the EP Committee on Development (2004-2009) and the Delegation to the ACP-EU Joint Parliamentary Assembly (2004-2009).

In 2009 she was reelected to the EP. She stayed a member of the EP Committee on Women's Rights and Gender Equality (2009-2014) and member of the EP Committee on Development (2009-2014), and became an additional member of the EP Delegation for Relations with Canada (2009-2014) and of the EP Special Committee on Organised Crime, Corruption and Money Laundering (2012-2014). In 2014 she was reelected to the EP. She stayed member of the EP Committee on Women's Rights and Gender Equality, member of the EP Committee on Development, member of the Delegation to the ACP-EU Joint Parliamentary Assembly and became, in addition, a member of the EP Committee on Industry, Research and Energy.

Among others, she was the rapporteur of the following EP reports: Women and poverty in the European Union (A6-0273/2005, 22 September 2005), Gender mainstreaming in the work of the committees (A6-0478/2006, 22 December 2006), Non-discrimination based on gender and intergenerational solidarity (A6-0492/2008, 10 December 2008), Gender mainstreaming in the work of its committees and delegations (A6-0198/2009, 2 April 2009).

Together with MEP it: Tiziano Motti, she introduced in April 2010 an EP Written Declaration (P7_TA(2010)0247), which asked the EU Council of Ministers and the EU Commission to extend the Directive 2006/24/EC to make it possible to have an "early-warning system" on pedophilia. In June 2010 this text was adopted as the official text of the EP after having been signed by 371 of 732 MEPs.

She was opposed to abortion. On 24 January 2011, she spoke at the March for Life in Washington, D.C. On 22 September 2013, she led one of the side events at the March for Life in Košice.

In September 2014 she nominated Louis Raphael I Sako (Chaldean Catholic Patriarch of Babylon) as a candidate for the 2014 EP Human Rights Sakharov Prize.

In 2024, she was the Vice-President of the International Pan-European Union. She was also head of the President of the Slovak Pan-European Union. In March 2024, she was preparing the KU for the European Parliament elections.

=== National Council of the Slovak Republic ===
Záborská was a member of the National Council of the Slovak Republic since the 2020 parliamentary election. She has been voted in with the Ordinary People and Independent Personalities (OĽaNO) party.

== Political positions ==
In 2020, Záborská proposed an anti-abortion bill to the National Council of the Slovak Republic, however, it did not pass.

In 2021, she voted to pass a proposal to amend the constitution, which would tie one's legal sex to that assigned at birth, effectively prohibiting transgender people from changing their legal sex. The bill would also amend the constitution to say that "parents are a father - a man, and a mother - a woman."
