= Monika Beňová =

Slovak politician

Monika Beňová MEP
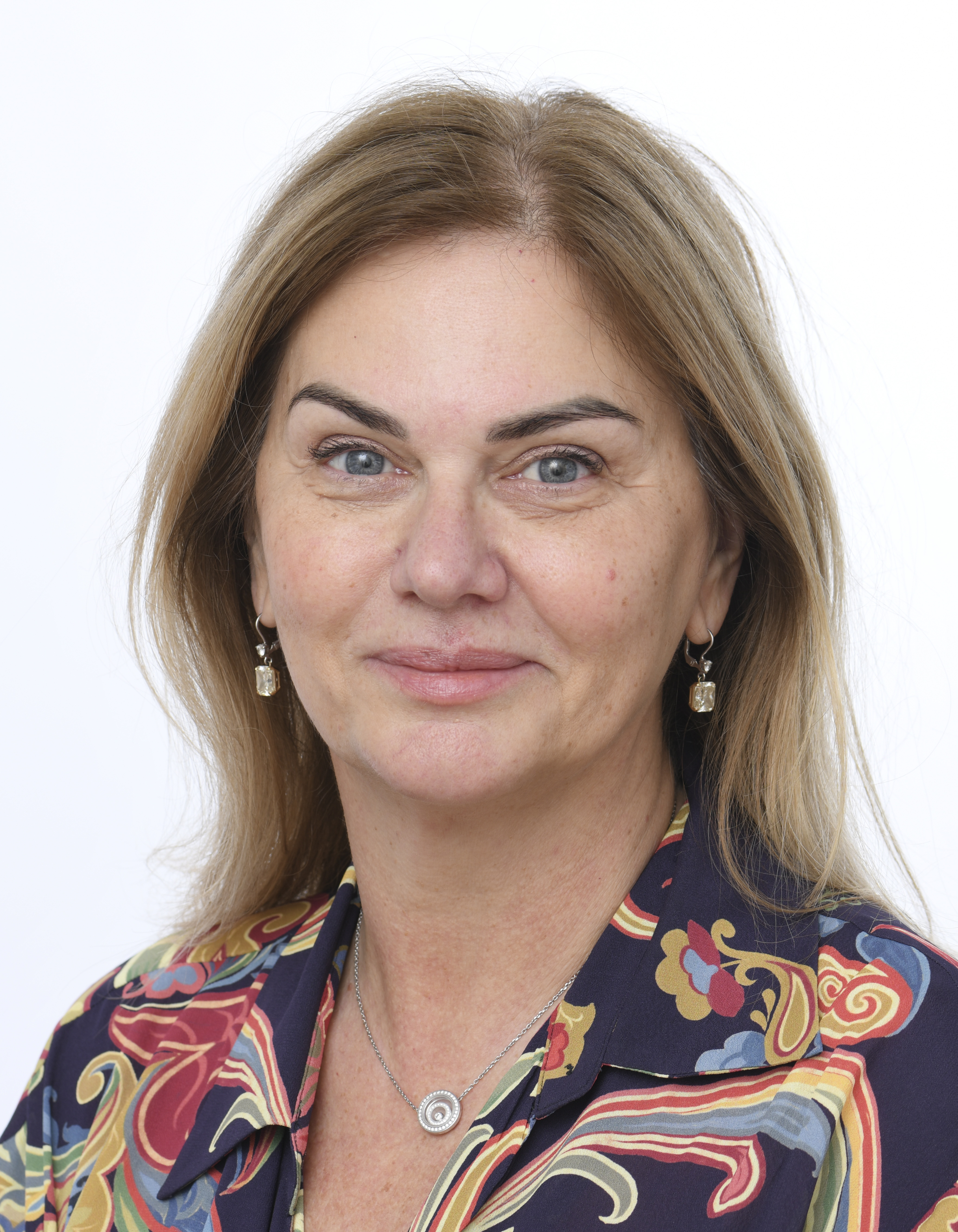
- Monika Beňová in 2024

Member of the European Parliament for Slovakia
- Incumbent
- Assumed office 20 July 2004

Quaestor of the European Parliament
- In office 4 July 2019 – 17 October 2023 Serving with See List

Member of the National Council
- In office 15 October 2002 – 20 July 2004

Personal details
- Born: 15 August 1968 (age 58) Bratislava, Czechoslovakia
- Party: Direction – Social Democracy (1999–present)
- Spouse(s): Martin Beňo (m. 1987; div. 2004) Fedor Flašík (m. 2006; div. 2017)
- Children: 2
- Education: Matej Bel School of Political Sciences and International Relations (PhDr.)
- Occupation: Politician

Monika Beňová (born 15 August 1968) is a Slovak politician who has been a member of the European Parliament since 2004. She is a member of the centre-left Direction-Social Democracy party SMER-SD. SMER-SD is a member of the Party of European Socialists. She presently serves on the Committee on the Environment, Public Health and Food Safety. At the same time she serves as a Quaestor of the European Parliament and therefore she is a member of the European Parliament's Bureau.

She was recruited into politics in 1999, being one of the founding members of the Smer-SD party. Since then she has served in the National Council of the Slovak Republic as well as the European Parliament. She is known for her progressivism and left-wing views.

== Early life and education ==
Monika Beňová was born on 15 August 1968 in Bratislava. She attended the Vazovova Gymnasium in Bratislava. In 2000, she enrolled in the Faculty of Political Science and International Relations at the Matej Bel University in Banská Bystrica. She graduated in 2005, with a master's degree in international relations. She was awarded eastern Europe degree PhDr. in 2007.

== Early career ==
Before starting her political career, she directed several companies between 1992 and 1999, among them several stores. In early she was made director of a new private radio station in Bratislava named Radio Koliba, owned by her future-husband Fedor Flasik. The radio station was criticized at the time for having a pro-government agenda, as well trying to squeeze politically neutral competitors out of the market by overbidding and overspending them.

== Political career ==
In 1998, she was first approached with the idea of starting a political party by future prime minister Robert Fico, her future-husband Fedor Flasik and Frantisek Határ. As a result of these discussions, she co-founded and subsequently became vice-chairwoman of the new social-democratic party Direction-Social Democracy (Smer-SD), with Fico as leader.

Alongside others such as Fico, Robert Kalinak and Pavol Paska she was a part of the new generation of politicians hand-picked to start a new left-wing political party where the leadership would be without ties to the former communist regime nor post-communist corruption scandals, the so-called "clean hands" strategy. She was re-elected during the 2003 party congress.

Having been elected to the National Council of the Slovak Republic on 15 October 2002, she got involved in the Committee for European Integration, which she directed. After that she took part in the Joint Parliamentary Committee between the European Parliament and the Slovak one. She was observer at the European Parliament from 2003 to 2004.

=== European Parliament ===
In the European Parliament Elections of 2004, she became a member of the European Parliament. She was re-elected in the European Parliament Elections of 2009, receiving the most personal preference votes of any candidate in Slovakia. In the European Parliament, she was a member of the Committee on Foreign Affairs and the vice-chairwoman of the Delegation for Relations with Israel.

Ranked as one of the most active members of parliament, Flašíková-Beňová asked 19 written questions in 2014. Almost all of those questions were delivered on February 12 and covered a wide range of topics, including the bee shortage in the EU, the origin of meat in the EU, demonstrations in Egypt, changes to the law on Ukraine, new rules for tobacco products, energy poverty and rising electricity bills. As for parliamentary speeches, Flašíková-Beňová mostly submits them in written form. Most recently she spoke, for instance, on the sound level of motor vehicles, rice imports from Bangladesh, in-vitro diagnostic medical devices, imports of timber and on vulnerable groups in Syria. During the 2009–2014 term, Flašíková-Beňová delivered one report as a rapporteur, on the situation of fundamental rights in the European Union (2010–2011), in November 2012. She was re-elected to a third consecutive term in the 2014 European election.

Following the 2019 elections, Beňová became a quaestor of the European Parliament. Her role as quaestor made her part of the Parliament's leadership under Presidents David Sassoli (2019–2022) and Roberta Metsola (since 2022).

=== Bid for mayorship of Bratislava ===
In 2006 Beňová was Smer-SD's official candidate for the mayorship of Bratislava, but eventually lost out to the Christian Democratic Movement (KDH) candidate Andrej Ďurkovský. In April 2013 she was nominated as the official candidate to run for the governorship of Bratislava Region. Prime Minister and Smer-SD chairman Robert Fico opined that Flašíková-Beňová would win, calling her a strong personality that would turn Bratislava Region upside down. In the end, Pavol Frešo, backed by Slovak Democratic and Christian Union (SDKÚ), Christian Democratic Movement (KDH), Most-Híd, Party of Hungarian Community (SMK), Freedom and Solidarity (SaS), Civic Conservative Party (OKS) and Green Party, collected 74.2 percent of the vote and defeated Flašíková-Beňová who picked 25.8 percent.

== Personal life ==
Monika Flašíková-Beňová has been married twice. Her first husband died in 2004, and she married her second, businessman Fedor Flašík, on 20 May 2006. They divorced in 2017.

She subsequently amended her last name back to Monika Beňová. She has one son, named Martin, from her first marriage and one daughter, named Lea.
