= 2004 European Parliament election in Slovakia =

13 June 2004	2009 →

All 14 Slovak seats in the European Parliament
- Turnout: 713,308 (16.96%)
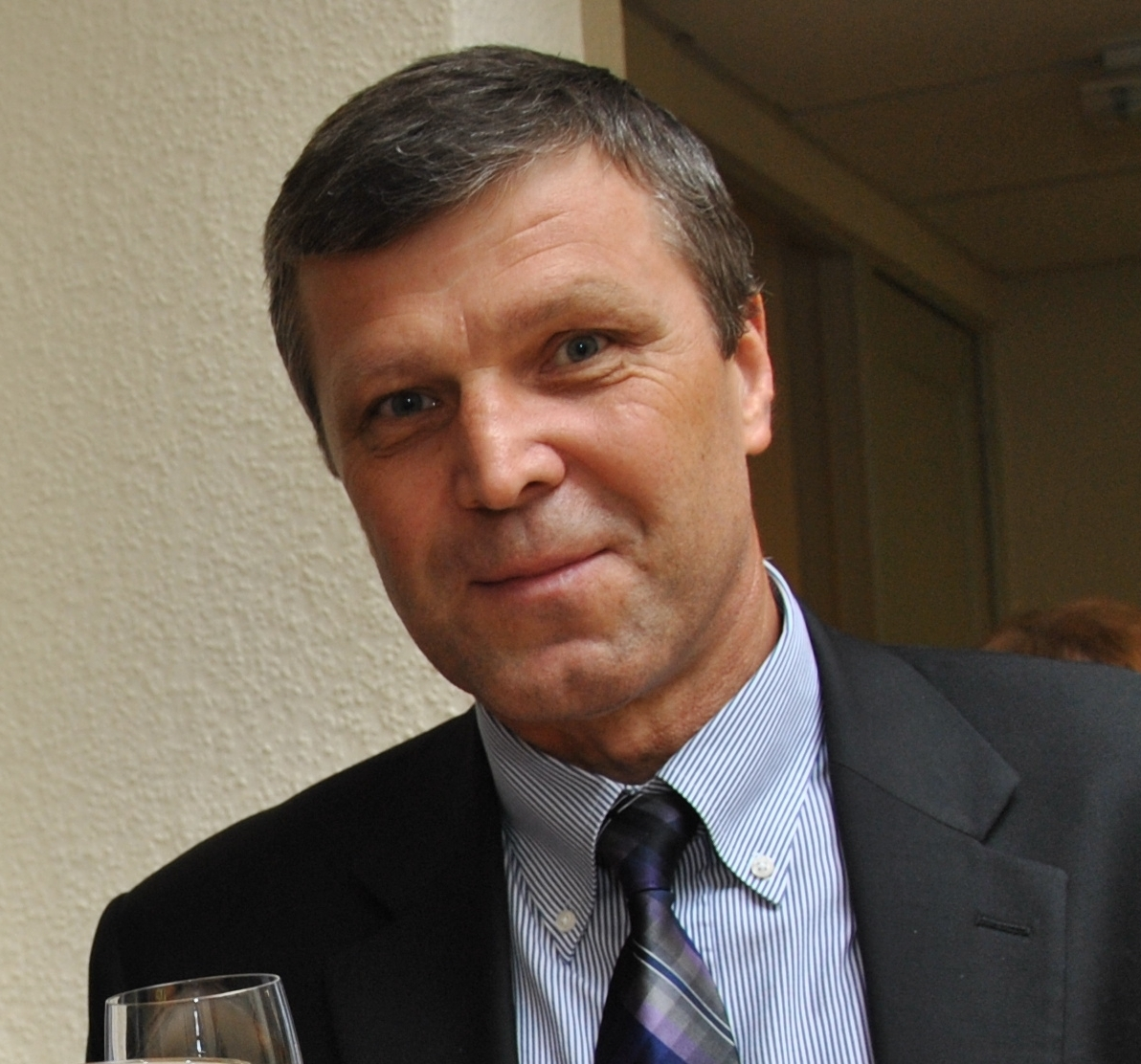

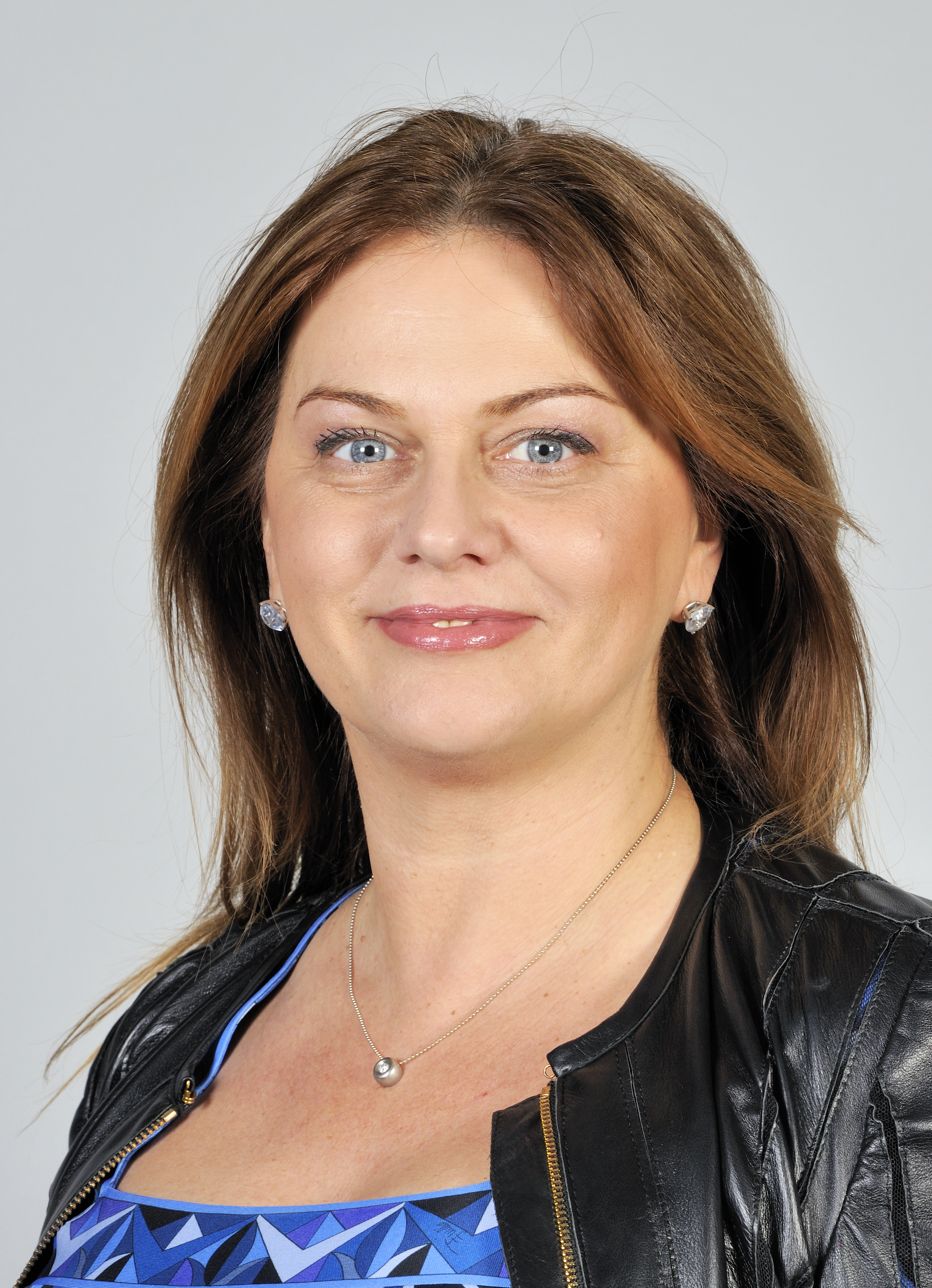

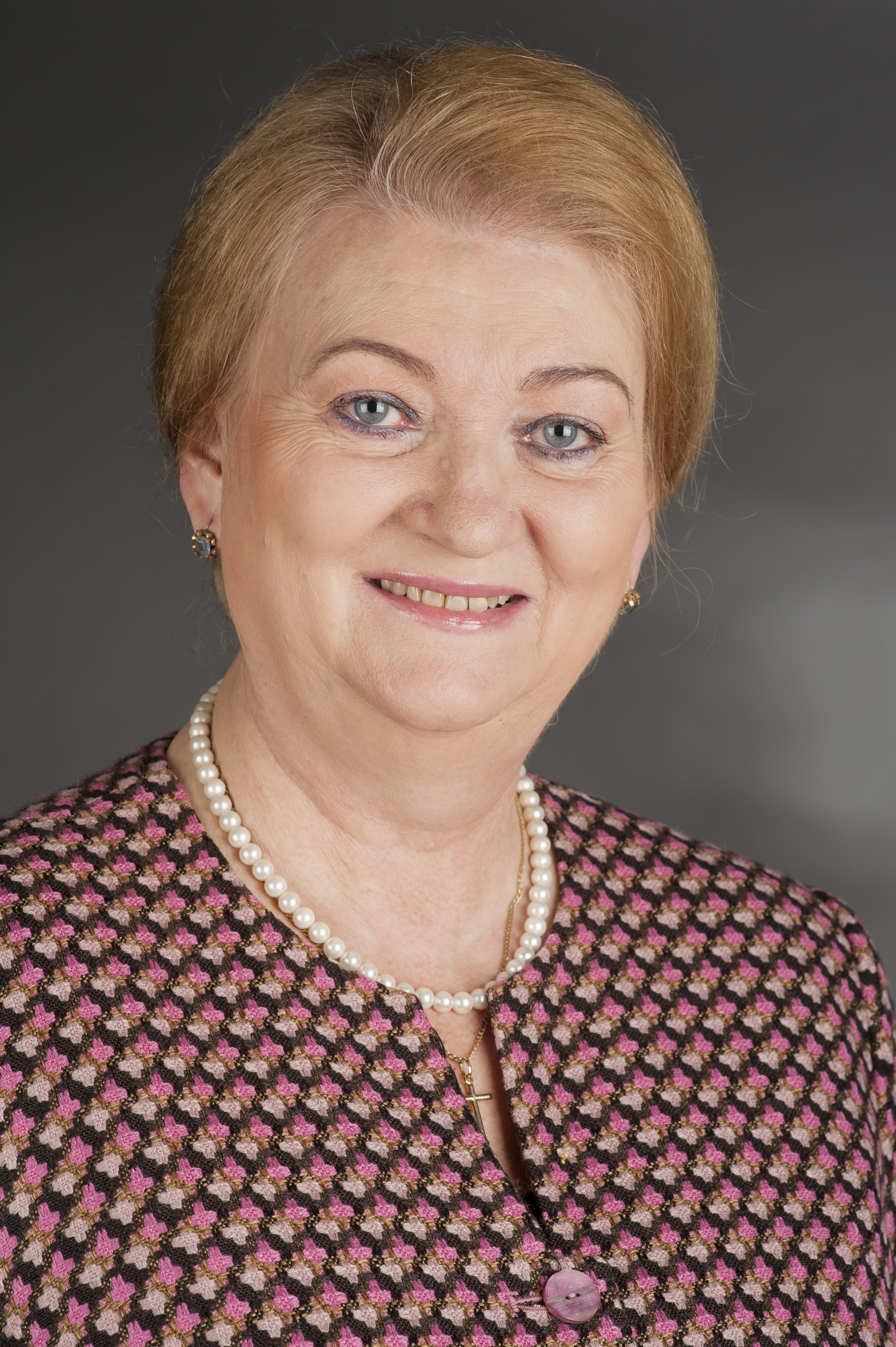

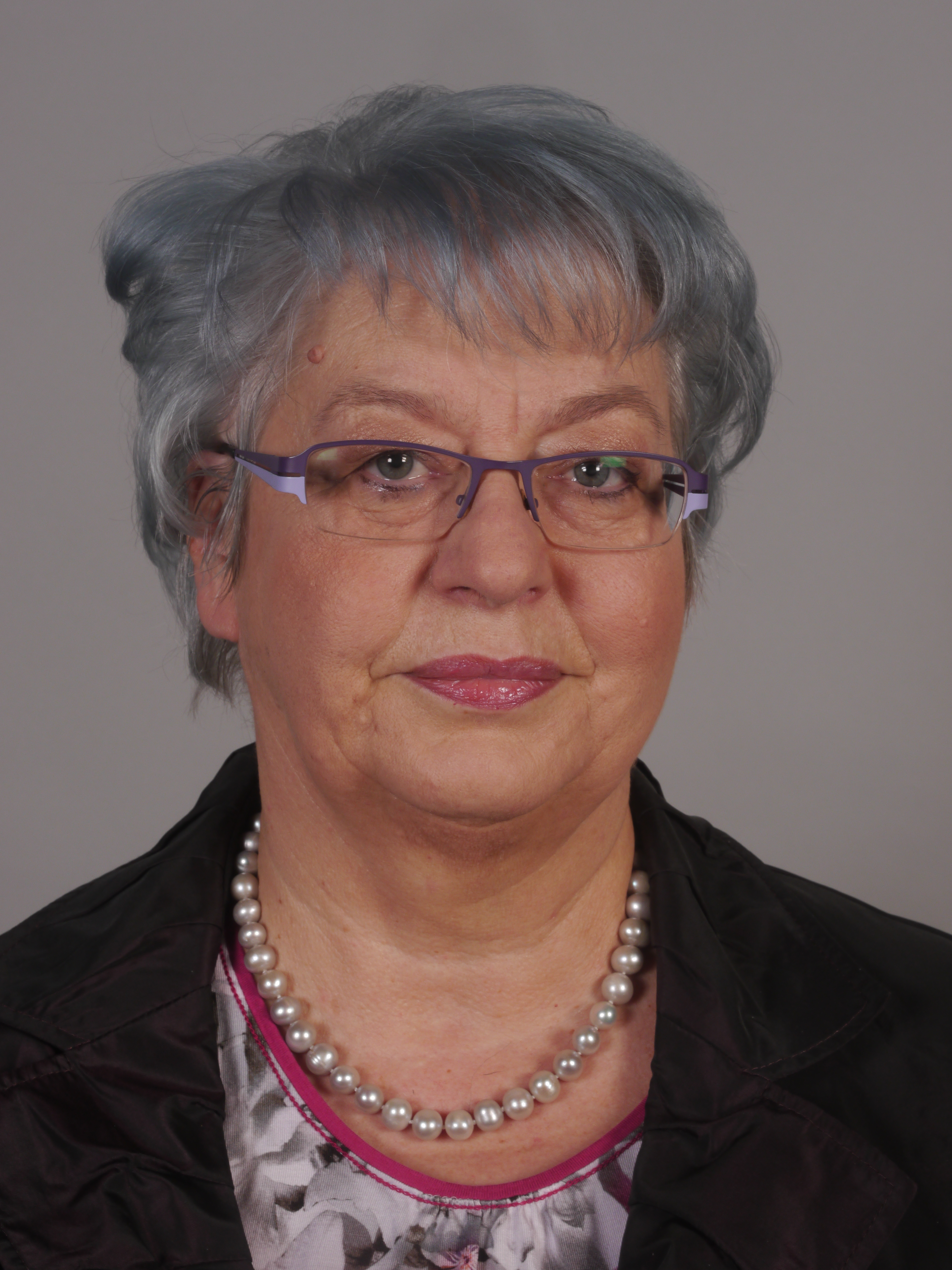
	First party	Second party	Third party
Leader	Peter Šťastný	Sergej Kozlík	Monika Beňová
Party	SDKÚ	ĽS-HZDS	Smer
Alliance	EPP	Non-Inscrits	S&D
Seats won	3	3	3
Popular vote	119,954	119,582	118,535
Percentage	17.09%	17.04%	16.89%
	Fourth party	Fifth party
Leader	Anna Záborská	Edit Bauer
Party	KDH	SMK-MKP
Alliance	EPP	EPP
Seats won	3	2
Popular vote	113,655	92,927
Percentage	16.19%	13.24%

An election of Members of the European Parliament representing Slovakia for the 2004–2009 term of the European Parliament was held on 13 June 2004 as part of the wider 2004 European election. They were the first European Parliament elections in Slovakia, held shortly after the country's accession to the European Union in May 2004. The turnout was the lowest of any country in the European Union. Support was evenly distributed among five parties.

== Main contesting parties ==
Name		Ideology	Leader
SDKÚ	Slovak Democratic and Christian Union; Slovenská demokratická a kresťanská únia	Conservative liberalism	Mikuláš Dzurinda
Smer	Direction (Third Way); Smer (tretia cesta)	Social democracy	Robert Fico
ĽS-HZDS	People's Party – Movement for Democratic Slovakia; Ľudová strana - Hnutie za demokratické Slovensko	National populism	Vladimír Mečiar
KDH	Christian Democratic Movement; Kresťanskodemokratické hnutie	Christian democracy	Pavol Hrušovský
SMK-MKP	Party of the Hungarian Community; Strana maďarskej komunity - Magyar Közösség Pártja	Hungarian minority interests	Béla Bugár
KSS	Communist Party of Slovakia; Komunistická strana Slovenska	Communism	Jozef Ševc
ANO	Alliance of the New Citizen; Aliancia nového občana	Liberalism	Pavol Rusko
SF	Free Forum; Slobodné Fórum	Social liberalism	Zuzana Martináková

== Results ==
Party	Votes	%	Seats
Slovak Democratic and Christian Union	119,954	17.10	3
People's Party – Movement for a Democratic Slovakia	119,582	17.04	3
Direction (Third Way)	118,535	16.90	3
Christian Democratic Movement	113,655	16.20	3
Party of the Hungarian Coalition	92,927	13.25	2
Alliance of the New Citizen	32,653	4.65	0
Communist Party of Slovakia	31,908	4.55	0
Free Forum	22,804	3.25	0
Slovak National Party–True Slovak National Party	14,150	2.02	0
Movement for Democracy–People's Union	11,914	1.70	0
Civic Conservative Party	7,060	1.01	0
Active Women – OS Slovakia	4,940	0.70	0
Roma Christian Democratic Movement in the Slovak Republic	4,856	0.69	0
Trade Licensing Party of the Slovak Republic	2,464	0.35	0
Hungarian Federalist Party	1,598	0.23	0
Democratic Union of Slovakia	1,354	0.19	0
Slovak People's Party	1,241	0.18	0
Total	701,595	100.00	14
Valid votes	701,595	98.36	
Invalid/blank votes	11,713	1.64	
Total votes	713,308	100.00	
Registered voters/turnout	4,210,463	16.94	
Source: Statistics.sk

Popular vote
SDKÚ	17.10%
ĽS-HZDS	17.04%
Smer	16.90%
KDH	16.20%
SMK-MKP	13.25%
ANO	4.65%
KSS	4.55%
SF	3.25%
