= Endorsements in the 2024 Slovak presidential election =

This is a list of notable individuals and organizations who voiced their endorsement for the office of the Slovak president, including those who subsequently retracted or withheld their endorsement of any candidate during the 2024 Slovak presidential election.

== Patrik Dubovský ==
=== Politicians ===
- Milan Krajniak, former Minister of Labour
- Richard Vašečka, MP, teacher, author
- Anna Záborská, leader of the Christian Union

=== Political Parties ===
- Slovakia (co-endorsed Matovič)
- Christian Union (co-endorsed Matovič)
- For the People (co-endorsed Matovič)

=== Activists and Public Figures ===
- Terézia Rončáková, university professor at Catholic University in Ružomberok
- Anton Ziolkovský, former spokesman of Conference of Slovak Bishops, Catholic priest in Nová Lesná

== Krisztián Forró ==
=== Politicians ===
National

- György Gyimesi, former MP
- József Berényi, vice-chairman of Trnava Region
- Terezia Földváry, mayor of Blatná na Ostrove
- Csaba Furik, mayor of Malý Horeš
- Zoltán Hájos, mayor of Dunajská Streda
- Peter Kolek, mayor of Galanta
- József Kopasz, mayor of Veľké Trakany
- Jozef Lukács, mayor of Ňárad
- József Menyhárt, 2019 presidential candidate
- Ferenc Miklós, mayor of Sap
- László Polák, mayor of Okoč
- Maria Soóky, mayor of Veľký Meder
- Gergely Török, mayor of Trhová Hradská
- Jozef Želinský, vice-mayor of Kráľovský Chlmec

International

- Árpád Potápi, State Secretary of the Prime Minister's Office for national policy of Hungary

=== Political Parties ===
- Hungarian Alliance

=== Artists ===
- Tamás Bernáth, actor
- Koppány Kovács, actor
- Eva Korpás, singer
- Mónika Rigó, singer
- Imre Vadkerti, singer

=== Sportspeople ===
- Tomi "Kid" Kovács, boxtrainer

=== Activists and public figures ===
- Irén Fekete, president of the Union of Hungarian Teachers in Slovakia
- Róbert Géresi, bishop of the Reformed Christian Church in Slovakia
- László Gubík, president of the Alliance for Common Goals

=== Media ===
- Ma7

== Štefan Harabin ==
=== Politicians ===
- Andrej Danko, Deputy Speaker of the National Council and leader of the Slovak National Party, withdrew candidacy
- Rudolf Huliak, MP, Mayor of Očová
- Miroslav Jureňa, former Minister of Agriculture and head of Harabin's election campaign
- Judita Laššáková, SMER-SD candidate in 2024 European Parliament election
- Adam Lučanský, MP
- Peter Marček, former MP
- Miroslav Radačovský, MEP and leader of Slovak PATRIOT
- Pavol Slota, leader of HOME National Party and son of Ján Slota
- Ivan Stanovič, leader of Patriotic Bloc
- Róbert Švec, leader of the Slovak Revival Movement, withdrew candidacy

=== Political Parties ===
- Slovak National Party
- National Coalition / Independent Candidates
- Republic
- Communist Party of Slovakia
- Common Citizens of Slovakia
- Labour of the Slovak Nation

=== Sportspeople ===
- Romana Tabak, former professional tennis player and former MP

=== Other personalities ===
- Tibor Eliot Rostas, journalist, writer, Republika candidate in 2024 European Parliament election
- Juraj Krajčík Sr., father of 2022 Bratislava shooting perpetrator

== Ivan Korčok ==
=== First round ===
==== Politicians ====
- Ján Budaj, former minister of Environment and leader of Change from Below
- Zuzana Čaputová, current President
- Veronika Cifrová Ostrihoňová, journalist, television presenter, politician
- Mikuláš Dzurinda, former Prime Minister
- Eduard Heger, former Prime Minister
- Martina Holečková, Chairperson of KDH parliamentary caucus
- Ľudovít Kaník, former Minister of Labour
- Andrej Kiska, former President
- Miriam Lexmann, MEP
- František Mikloško, former Speaker of the Slovak National Council
- František Majerský, MP, rescue worker
- Vladimíra Marcinková, MP
- Lucia Ďuriš Nicholsonová, MEP and leader of Jablko
- Ľudovít Ódor, former Prime Minister
- Iveta Radičová, former Prime Minister
- Zuzana Šubová, leader of the Pirate Party - Slovakia
- Ivan Štefanec, MEP
- Tomáš Valášek, MP, diplomat

==== Political Parties ====
- The Blues – ES
- Chance
- Change from Below
- Christian Democratic Movement
- Civic Conservative Party
- Civic Democrats of Slovakia
- Democrats of Slovakia
- Democratic Party
- Democrats
- Freedom and Solidarity
- Košice Party
- Most–Híd 2023
- Pirate Party - Slovakia
- Progressive Slovakia

==== Artists ====
- Ludwig Bagin, actor
- Oľga Belešová, actor, author, TV personality
- Katarína Brychtová, actress, TV presenter
- Štefan Bučko, actor, reciter, presenter
- Peter Cmorik, singer, musician
- Emma Drobná, singer
- Ján Gordulič, comedian, actor, screenplay writer and producer
- Jana Kovalčíková, actress
- Pavol Habera, singer, musician, composer, and musical actor
- Ady Hajdu, actor
- Denisa Havrľová, photographer, documentarian
- Viktor Horján, actor
- Fero Joke, comedian
- Katarzia, artist, singer, songwriter, producer
- Juraj Kemka, actor, dubbing actor and television personality
- Milan Kňažko, actor, former politician
- Ján Koleník, actor
- David Koller, Czech singer
- Katarína Koščová, singer
- Miloslav Kráľ, actor
- Peter Lipa, jazz singer, composer
- Štefan Martinovič, actor, dubbing actor and comedian
- Marián Mitaš, actor, radio presenter and puppeteer
- Eva Pavlíková, actress
- Jakub Petraník, singer
- Zuzana Porubjaková, actress
- Simona Salátová, comedian
- Anna Šišková, actress
- Nikita Slovák, director
- Kristína Tormová, actress, singer, dramaturge, presenter, comedian, editor, blogger and naïve art painter
- Joe Trendy, comedian, screenplay writer, TV personality, podcaster
- Zuzana Vačková, actress

==== Businesspeople ====
- Andrea Basilová and Martin Basil, founders of Senseoneo software company
- Dalibor Cicman, entrepreneur, founder, owner and CEO of GymBeam
- Michal Meško, CEO of Martinus online bookstore

==== Sportspeople ====
- Michal Handzuš, former ice hockey player and coach
- Marián Vajda, former tennis player and coach

==== Activists and public figures ====
- Róbert Bezák, Archbishop Emeritus of Trnava
- Marek Janiga, activist, student, charity
- Daniela Ostatníková, doctor, university professor at Comenius University

==== Non-governmental organisations ====
- Society for Open Christianity of the 21st Century

==== Others ====
- Sandra Sviteková, YouTuber and teacher

=== Second round ===
==== Politicians ====
- Andrea Danihelová, Spokesperson of Volt Slovakia
- Patrik Dubovský, 2024 presidential candidate
- Gábor Grendel, leader of NOVA
- Štefan Markuš, former politician, 1998 Presidential candidate, former scientist and author
- Igor Matovič, 2024 presidential candidate and former Prime Minister
- Ján Mičovský, former Minister of Agriculture and former MP, ranger, environmental activist
- Juraj Šeliga, former MP and former Vice-chairman of the National Council
- Zsolt Simon, former Minister of Agriculture and leader of Forum
- Branislav Škripek, former MEP and MP
- Matúš Vallo, Mayor of Bratislava and leader of Team Bratislava
- Jana Žitňanská, former MEP

==== Political Parties ====
- For the People
- Forum
- Roma Coalition Party
- Slovakia
- Volt Slovakia

==== Artists ====
- Zorán Ardamica, writer
- Alexander Bárta, actor
- Hex, pop band
- Vica Kerekes, Slovak actress
- Zuzana Kronerová, actress
- Juraj Nvota, director, actor, professor at VŠMU
- Dorota Sadovská, painter, photographer, artist

==== Activists and Public figures ====
- Róbert Flamík, Catholic priest, Salesian, author
- Anton Frič, photographer, charity worker
- Tomáš Halík, Czech Catholic priest, philosopher, theologian and professor at Faculty of Arts at Charles University
- Ján Holubčík, Catholic priest, Salesian, music festival director
- Branislav Kľuska, professor at Catholic University in Ružomberok
- Hermana Matláková, nun, columnist, teacher
- Marek Mucha, Catholic priest of Diocese of Žilina, apiculturist
- Daniel Pastričák, preacher of the Church of the Brethern
- Terézia Rončáková, university professor at Catholic University in Ružomberok
- Adam Štefanec, Catholic priest, amateur footballer
- Jozef Zachar, Catholic priest, Salesian

==== Others ====
- Eva Mosnáková, Holocaust survivor

== Marian Kotleba ==
=== Political Parties ===
- People's Party Our Slovakia

== Igor Matovič ==
=== Political Parties ===
- Slovakia (co-endorsed Dubovský)
- Christian Union (co-endorsed Dubovský)
- For the People (co-endorsed Dubovský)

== Peter Pellegrini ==
=== First round ===
==== Politicians ====
National

- Anna Belousovová, former MP, leader of the Alternative for Slovakia
- Martin Borguľa, former MP
- Eduard Chmelár, former leader of Socialisti.sk
- Robert Fico, current Prime Minister
- Ivan Gašparovič, former President
- Vladimír Mečiar, former Prime Minister
- Dušan Tittel, MP, former footballer

International

- Andrej Babiš, former Prime Minister of the Czech Republic
- Miloš Zeman, former President of the Czech Republic

==== Political Parties ====
- Voice – Social Democracy
- Direction – Social Democracy
- Slovaks Forward, minority party in Serbia

==== Businesspeople ====
- Vladimír Soták, co-owner of Železiarne Podbrezová

==== Unions ====
- Union of Pensioners of Slovakia

==== Sportspeople ====
- Lukáš Pellegrini, footballer, local councillor in Banská Štiavnica
- Erik Vlček, sprint canoer

=== Second round ===
==== Politicians ====
- Gergely Agócs, mayor of Kráľov Brod
- Imre Andruskó, former MP
- Gyula Bárdos, former MP
- József Berényi, former leader of the Party of the Hungarian Coalition
- Tibor Csenger, member of the Hungarian Alliance presidium
- Zoltán Cziprusz, member of the Hungarian Alliance presidium
- Andrej Danko, Deputy Speaker of the National Council and leader of the Slovak National Party
- Zuzana Dolinková, Minister of Health
- Krisztián Forró, 2024 presidential candidate and leader of the Hungarian Alliance
- Csaba Furik, mayor of Malý Horeš
- György Gyimesi, former MP
- Miroslav Jureňa, former Minister of Agriculture and head of Harabin's election campaign
- Ján Kubiš, 2024 presidential candidate and former Minister of Foreign Affairs
- Filip Kuffa, State Secretary of the Ministry of the Environment
- Štefan Kuffa, State Secretary at the Ministry of Environment
- Judita Laššáková, candidate in 2024 European Parliament election
- Vladimír Maňka, mayor of Zvolen and former MEP
- József Nagy, former Minister of Environment
- Milan Náhlik, 2024 presidential candidate
- Ján Nosko, mayor of Banská Bystrica
- Örs Orosz, member of the Hungarian Alliance presidium
- Attila Pál, member of the Hungarian Alliance presidium
- Péter Pandy, member of the Hungarian Alliance presidium
- Ján Slota, former leader of the Slovak National Party and the True Slovak National Party
- Pavol Slota, leader of HOME National Party
- Tomáš Taraba, Deputy Prime Minister of Slovakia and former leader of Life – National Party
- Miklós Viola, member of the Hungarian Alliance presidium

==== Political Parties ====
- Communist Party of Slovakia
- Hungarian Alliance
- Life – National Party
- National Coalition / Independent Candidates
- Slovak National Party
- We Are Family

==== Artists ====
- Jasmína Alagič Vrbovská, model, television personality
- Jozef Banáš, author, former MP
- Patrik "Rytmus" Vrbovský, rapper

==== Sportspeople ====
- Dominika Cibulková, former tennis player
- Tomi "Kid" Kovács, boxtrainer
- Romana Tabak, former professional tennis player and former MP
- Attila Végh, MMA fighter

==== Activists and Public Figures ====
- Marián Kuffa, Roman Catholic Parish Priest of Žakovce, founder of Institute of Christ the High Priest, author
- Zuzana Strausz Plačková, influencer, entrepreneur

==== Union ====
- Club 500, large employers' union

==== Media ====
- Ma7

== Declined & None of the Above ==
=== First round ===
==== Politicians ====
- Boris Kollár, former Speaker of the National Council and leader of We Are Family

==== Activists and Public Figures ====
- Anton Frič, photographer, charity worker
- Ján Duda, Catholic priest, canon lawyer, professor at Comenius University

=== Second round ===
==== Politicians ====
- Štefan Harabin, 2024 presidential candidate
- Marian Kotleba, 2024 presidential candidate
- Vladimír Palko, former Interior Minister and former leader of Conservative Democrats of Slovakia
- Stanislav Pirošík, Socialisti.sk candidate in 2024 European Parliament election, former candidate of Resistance - Labour Party
- Ivan Stanković, leader of Patriotic Bloc
- Róbert Švec, leader of the Slovak Revival Movement
- Anna Záborská, leader of the Christian Union

==== Political Parties ====
- Christian Union
- Patriotic Bloc
- People's Party Our Slovakia
- Slovak Revival Movement

== Oppositions to campaigns ==
=== Ivan Korčok ===
==== First round ====
- Marián Kuffa, Roman Catholic Parish Priest of Žakovce, founder of Institute of Christ the High Priest

==== Second round ====
- Anton Andráš (KDH), former Interior Minister
- Ján Čarnogurský (KDH), former Prime Minister
- Ján Klepáč, former leader of the Christian Social Union
- Ján Kubiš, founding member of the KDH
- Jozef Kuzma (KDH), former MP
- Viliam Oberhauser, former leader of the Christian Social Union
- Gabriel Smatana, founding member of the KDH
- Ivan Tirpák (KDH), former president of the Commission for the Environment
- Milan Uhrík, leader of Republic

=== Igor Matovič ===
==== First round ====
- Lucia Ďuriš Nicholsonová, MEP and leader of Jablko
