= Opinion polling for the 2024 Slovak presidential election =

This page lists nationwide public opinion polls that have been conducted relating to the 2024 Slovak presidential election. Poll results are listed in the tables below in reverse chronological order, showing the most recent first. The highest percentage figure in each polling survey is displayed in bold, and the background shaded in the leading candidate's colour. In the instance that there is a tie, then no figure is shaded. Poll results use the date the survey's fieldwork was done, as opposed to the date of publication; however, if such date is unknown, the date of publication will be given instead.

== Opinion polls for the first round ==
=== Since nominations were closed ===
Date	Agency	Ivan Korčok	Peter Pellegrini	Štefan Harabin	Krisztián Forró	Igor Matovič	Ján Kubiš	Patrik Dubovský	Marian Kotleba	Milan Náhlik	Andrej Danko	Róbert Švec
**23 March 2024**	**First round election**	42.52%	37.03%	11.74%	2.91%	2.18%	2.04%	0.71%	0.57%	0.14%	0.08%	0.08%
23 March 2024 (Exit Poll)	RTVS + Median	34.9%	34.3%	15.0%	3.0%	4.5%	4.3%	0.5%	2.8%	0.5%	—	—
20 March 2024	**Róbert Švec drops out and endorses Štefan Harabin (remains on ballot)**											
16–19 March 2024	Ipsos	36.3%	37.5%	13.1%	4.3%	3.6%	2.5%	1.1%	0.9%	0.1%	—	0.8%
18 March 2024	**Andrej Danko drops out and endorses Štefan Harabin (remains on ballot)**											
13–18 March 2024	NMS	36.0%	34.2%	16.0%	2.7%	4.0%	2.8%	0.9%	2.2%	0.2%	0.5%	0.5%
11–17 March 2024	Sanep	33.1%	35.6%	12.0%	2.6%	5.2%	3.6%	1.9%	2.7%	0.5%	2.0%	0.8%
12–16 March 2024	Ipsos	36.6%	37.4%	11.3%	2.8%	4.3%	2.4%	—	1.8%	1.1%	0.9%	—
7–13 March 2024	Median	35.7%	34.2%	11.4%	2.7%	3.2%	3.2%	1.8%	2.3%	1.0%	2.3%	2.2%
7–11 March 2024	Focus	33.1%	34.4%	12.7%	3.2%	4.7%	4.5%	1.5%	1.8%	0.4%	3.1%	0.6%
26–29 February 2024	Sanep	32.7%	38.3%	10.2%	2.8%	5.8%	4.1%	1.3%	1.9%	0.6%	2.0%	0.3%
23–27 February 2024	Median	36.0%	32.7%	11.2%	2.7%	4.9%	3.2%	2.0%	2.1%	1.1%	2.2%	1.9%
16–21 February 2024	Ipsos	36.3%	40.2%	8.5%	3.0%	4.3%	3.4%	1.3%	1.7%	—	1.1%	—
14–21 February 2024	Focus	34.0%	35.2%	11%	3.1%	5.0%	4.3%	1.3%	2.4%	0.5%	3.2%	—
14–18 February 2024	NMS	34.6%	35.8%	10%	2.2%	6.6%	4.8%	1.1%	2%	1.5%	1.3%	—
5–12 February 2024	AKO	37.2%	39.0%	8.1%	2.4%	4.8%	3.0%	1.9%	0.9%	0.6%	2.1%	—

=== Before nominations were closed ===
Date	Agency	Peter Pellegrini	Ivan Korčok	Maroš Žilinka	Štefan Harabin	Peter Weiss	Robert Mistrík	Marian Kotleba	Ján Kubiš	Miriam Lexmann	Robert Fico	Ján Drgonec	Andrej Danko	Krisztián Forró	Ľudovít Ódor	Jozef Banáš	Milan Uhrík	Boris Kollár	Others
28 January 2024	Focus	38.1%	**35.6%**	—	10.9%	—	—	—	4.9%	—	—	—	3.3%	2.3%	—	—	—	—	—
22–25 January 2024	Ipsos	40.7%	**38.2%**	—	8.0%	—	—	1.6%	2.1%	—	—	—	1.7%	3.3%	—	—	—	—	3.3%
11–16 January 2024	AKO	40.6%	**37.7%**	—	8.0%	—	—	—	3.1%	—	—	2.2%	—	2.4%	—	—	—	—	—
16 January 2024	NMS	32.4%	**33.0%**	—	11.0%	—	—	—	4.3%	—	—	2.2%	1.8%	1.9%	—	—	—	—	4.1%
2 January 2024	SANEP	43.9%	**32.3%**	—	9.8%	—	—	—	9.9%	—	—	—	3.5%	0.6%	—	—	—	—	—
13–18 December 2023	Ipsos	25%	**16%**	—	7%	—	—	—	2%	2%	—	—	—	2%	—	—	—	—	—
13 November-17 December 2023	Median SK	30.3%	**23.3%**	2.1%	—	—	3.2%	—	—	2.5%	15.2%	—	—	—	4.9%	5.5%	4.2%	3.7%	5.1%
7–14 November 2023	AKO	40.0%	**30.4%**	—	8.9%	—	3.6%	—	5.8%	1.9%	—	—	—	—	—	—	—	—	9.5%
10 November 2023	Ipsos	19%	**14%**	8%	8%	—	3%	—	2%	—	—	—	—	—	—	—	—	—	—
July 2023	Ipsos	12%	11%	8%	7%	—	3%	—	3%	3%	**13%**	—	—	4%	—	—	—	—	—
21–28 June 2023	Focus	13%	**10%**	8%	4%	3%	2%	2%	2%	1%	—	—	—	—	—	—	—	—	—

=== Polls with Čaputová ===
Date	Agency	Zuzana Čaputová	Peter Pellegrini	Robert Fico	Štefan Harabin	Milan Uhrík	Maroš Žilinka	Marian Kotleba	Maroš Šefčovič	Mikuláš Dzurinda	Iveta Radičová	Jozef Banáš	Eduard Chmelár	Andrej Kiska	Boris Kollár	Ivan Korčok	Miroslav Lajčák	Peter Weiss	Robert Mistrík	Others
26-29 February 2024	Sanep	**14%**	**20%**	4.0%	—	—	—	—	—	—	—	—	—	—	—	9.0%	—	—	—	22.0%
14 March 2023	Ipsos	**30.0%**	—	—	**7.0%**	—	**7.0%**	3.0%	—	—	—	—	—	—	—	6.0%	—	3.0%	2.0%	—
1–8 February 2023	Focus	**18.3%**	**6.0%**	5.4%	2.5%	1.5%	1.5%	1.4%	1.4%	1.3%	1.3%	1.2%	1.2%	1.2%	1.0%	1.0%	1.0%	—	—	52.7%

== Opinion polls for the second round ==
Diagram

Pellegrini vs Korčok

Date	Agency	Peter Pellegrini	Ivan Korčok
**6 April 2024**	**Second round election**	**53.1**	46.9
6 April 2024 (Exit poll)	Median SK	48.9	**51.1**
30 March–2 April 2024	Ipsos	49.9	**50.1**
28 March–2 April 2024	NMS	48.3	**51.7**
28 March–2 April 2024	Focus	**50.8**	49.2
28–31 March 2024	Median SK	**51.1**	48.9
25–2 April 2024	SCIO	45.01	**54.99**
23 March 2024	**1st round of election**		
16–19 March 2024	Ipsos	**54.5**	45.5
13–18 March 2024	NMS	**50.9**	49.1
11–17 March 2024	Sanep	**54.9**	45.1
12–16 March 2024	Ipsos	**53.4**	46.6
7–13 March 2024	Median	**52.9**	47.1
7–11 March 2024	Focus	**56**	44
26-29 February 2024	Sanep	**54.1**	45.9
23–27 February 2024	Median	**51.7**	48.3
16–21 February 2024	Ipsos	**53.8**	46.2
14–21 February 2024	Focus	**54.9**	45.1
14–18 February 2024	NMS	**52.3**	47.7
5–12 February 2024	AKO	**53.7**	46.3
28 January 2024	Focus	**54.2**	45.8
22–25 January 2024	Ipsos	**54.7**	45.3
16 January 2024	NMS	**51.5**	48.5
2 January 2024	Sanep	**58.1**	41.9
15–22 November 2023	Focus	**60**	40
13–18 December 2023	Ipsos	**48**	27
10 November 2023	Ipsos	**40**	26
6–13 September 2023	Focus	**58**	42

=== Hypothetical polling ===
The polls listed below include candidates who decided not to run, withdrawn from election or failed to advance to second round.

Pellegrini vs Harabin

Date	Agency	Peter Pellegrini	Štefan Harabin
7–11 March 2024	Focus	72.9	27.1
14–21 February 2024	Focus	76.1	23.9
14–18 February 2024	NMS	71.0	29.0
5–12 February 2024	AKO	68.6	31.4
15–22 November 2023	Focus	84	16
10 November 2023	Ipsos	45	13

Korčok vs Harabin

Date	Agency	Ivan Korčok	Štefan Harabin
7–11 March 2024	Focus	56.1	43.9
14–21 February 2024	Focus	62.8	37.2
14–18 February 2024	NMS	59.8	40.2
5–12 February 2024	AKO	63.1	36.9
15–22 November 2023	Focus	67	33
6–13 September 2023	Focus	63	37

Pellegrini vs Kubiš

Date	Agency	Peter Pellegrini	Ján Kubiš
14–21 February 2024	Focus	**71.2**	28.8
15–22 November 2023	Focus	**74**	26
10 November 2023	Ipsos	**49**	19

Korčok vs Kubiš

Date	Agency	Ivan Korčok	Ján Kubiš
5–12 February 2024	AKO	**64.3**	35.7
15–22 November 2023	Focus	**62**	38
6–13 September 2023	Focus	**58**	42

Kubiš vs Harabin

Date	Agency	Ján Kubiš	Štefan Harabin
15–22 November 2023	Focus	**67**	33
6–13 September 2023	Focus	**66**	34

Pellegrini vs Matovič

Date	Agency	Peter Pellegrini	Igor Matovič
16–21 February 2024	Ipsos	**80.6**	19.4

Pellegrini vs Danko

Date	Agency	Peter Pellegrini	Andrej Danko
16–21 February 2024	Ipsos	**83.6**	16.4

Pellegrini vs Kotleba

Date	Agency	Peter Pellegrini	Marian Kotleba
16–21 February 2024	Ipsos	**88.5**	11.5

Korčok vs Matovič

Date	Agency	Ivan Korčok	Igor Matovič
16–21 February 2024	Ipsos	**86.5**	13.5

Korčok vs Danko

Date	Agency	Ivan Korčok	Andrej Danko
16–21 February 2024	Ipsos	**66.9**	33.1

Korčok vs Kotleba

Date	Agency	Ivan Korčok	Marian Kotleba
16–21 February 2024	Ipsos	**79.9**	20.1

Pellegrini vs Fico

Date	Agency	Peter Pellegrini	Robert Fico
6–13 September 2023	Focus	**65**	35

Pellegrini vs Mistrík

Date	Agency	Peter Pellegrini	Robert Mistrík
10 November 2023	Ipsos	**42**	18
6–13 September 2023	Focus	**68**	32

Pellegrini vs Žilinka

Date	Agency	Peter Pellegrini	Maroš Žilinka
10 November 2023	Ipsos	**51**	18

Korčok vs Fico

Date	Agency	Ivan Korčok	Robert Fico
6–13 September 2023	Focus	**50**	**50**

Čaputová vs Fico

Date	Agency	Zuzana Čaputová	Robert Fico
20 April 2023	Ipsos	**41**	27

Čaputová vs Harabin

Date	Agency	Zuzana Čaputová	Štefan Harabin
20 April 2023	Ipsos	**42**	21

Čaputová vs Mistrík

Date	Agency	Zuzana Čaputová	Robert Mistrík
20 April 2023	Ipsos	**36**	13

Čaputová vs Pellegrini

Date	Agency	Zuzana Čaputová	Peter Pellegrini
20 April 2023	Ipsos	**37**	28

Čaputová vs Weiss

Date	Agency	Zuzana Čaputová	Peter Weiss
20 April 2023	Ipsos	**39**	16

Čaputová vs Žilinka

Date	Agency	Zuzana Čaputová	Maroš Žilinka
20 April 2023	Ipsos	**39**	21

== Other polls ==
Polling firm	Fieldwork date	Sample size	Question	Answer				Lead
Polling firm	Fieldwork date	Sample size	Question	Certainly yes	Maybe	Certainly no	Don't know	Lead
Focus	25–31; May 2022	1,008	Would you vote for Zuzana Čaputová in the presidential election?	15%	31%	**46%**	8%	15%

Polling firm	Fieldwork date	Sample size	Question	Answer				Lead
Polling firm	Fieldwork date	Sample size	Question	Certainly yes	Probably yes	Probably no	Certainly no	Lead
AKO	20–23; Nov 2021	1,000	Would you vote for Zuzana Čaputová in the presidential election?	**44.9%**	15.9%	8.4%	30.8%	14.1%
