= Peter Pčolinský =

Slovak politician (born 1982)

Member of the National Council
- Incumbent
- Assumed office 5 March 2016

Personal details
- Born: 6 April 1982 (age 44) Nižný Hrabovec, Czechoslovakia
- Party: We Are Family
- Spouse: Adriana Pčolinská
- Relations: Vladimír Pčolinský (Brother)
- Education: Comenius University

Peter Pčolinský (born 6 April 1982) is a Slovak activist and politician. Since 2016, he has served as a member of the National Council and, since 2020, he has held the position of deputy speaker. He is one of the co-founders of the We are Family party.

== Early life ==
Pčolinský was born in 1982 in the village of Nižný Hrabovec, close to Vranov nad Topľou. He studied management at the Comenius University.

== Activism and political career ==
Pčolinský served as an aide to the Interior Ministers Vladimír Palko and Daniel Lipšic.

In 2012, Pčolinský was one of the key organizers of the anti-corruption protests sparked by the Gorilla scandal. In 2015, he co-founded, with Milan Krajniak, the 300 Movement, named after the 300 Spartans who heroically fell in the Battle of Thermopylae. Later that year, Pčolinský, Krajniak and Boris Kollár took control of a minor political party called NÁŠ KRAJ (OUR REGION), despite objections from some party leaders and transformed it into the We are Family party.

Pčolinský was successfully elected to the parliament on the We are Family list in both the 2016 and 2020 Slovak parliamentary elections. In October 2020, he was elected Deputy Chairman of the National Council.

== Personal life ==
His brother, Vladimír Pčolinský, was the director of the Slovak Information Service from 2020 until his arrest for alleged bribery in 2021. Peter Pčolinský defended his brother following the arrest and blamed the interior affairs minister Roman Mikulec for plotting against him.

His sister in law, Adriana Pčolinská, is also a Sme Rodina MP.
