= University of Central Europe =

Former private college in Skalica, Slovakia

- Stredoeurópska vysoká škola
- Other names: SEVŠ
- Type: Private university
- Active: 31 May 2005–June 2, 2021
- Academic affiliations: Erasmus Programme
- Location: Skalica, Slovakia; 48°50′50″N 17°13′57″E
- Website: www.sevs.sk (no longer online)

The University of Central Europe (Slovak: Stredoeurópska vysoká škola v Skalici (SEVŠ)) was a private university located in Skalica, Slovakia. The university was founded in 2005 with the ambition to become a "Slovak Cambridge", but struggled with financial problems and lost its accreditation in 2021.

In 2022 the university declared bankruptcy. The school offered education in international relations, environment and regional development.The number of students of the university peaked at 1,181 in 2013 and declined to the last available number of only 172 in 2018. In addition to the main campus in Skalica, the university had a campus in Košice until 2019.

== Controversy ==
In June 2020, the plagiarized diploma theses of the We Are Family party MP Petra Krištúfková as well as the party leader and Speaker of the National Council Boris Kollár defended at SEVŠ became public knowledge. Likewise, the thesis of Slovak Bratislava football club vice-president Ivan Kmotrík jr., the son of the businessman Ivan Kmotrík sr. who was the president of SEVŠ board, turned out to be plagiarized as well.

A government audit in 2021 found that several holders of SEVŠ diplomas never applied to study at the university and there is no proof they ever attended any classes.

== See also ==
- Epicode
- Jönköping University
