= László Gubík =

Slovak politician and activist

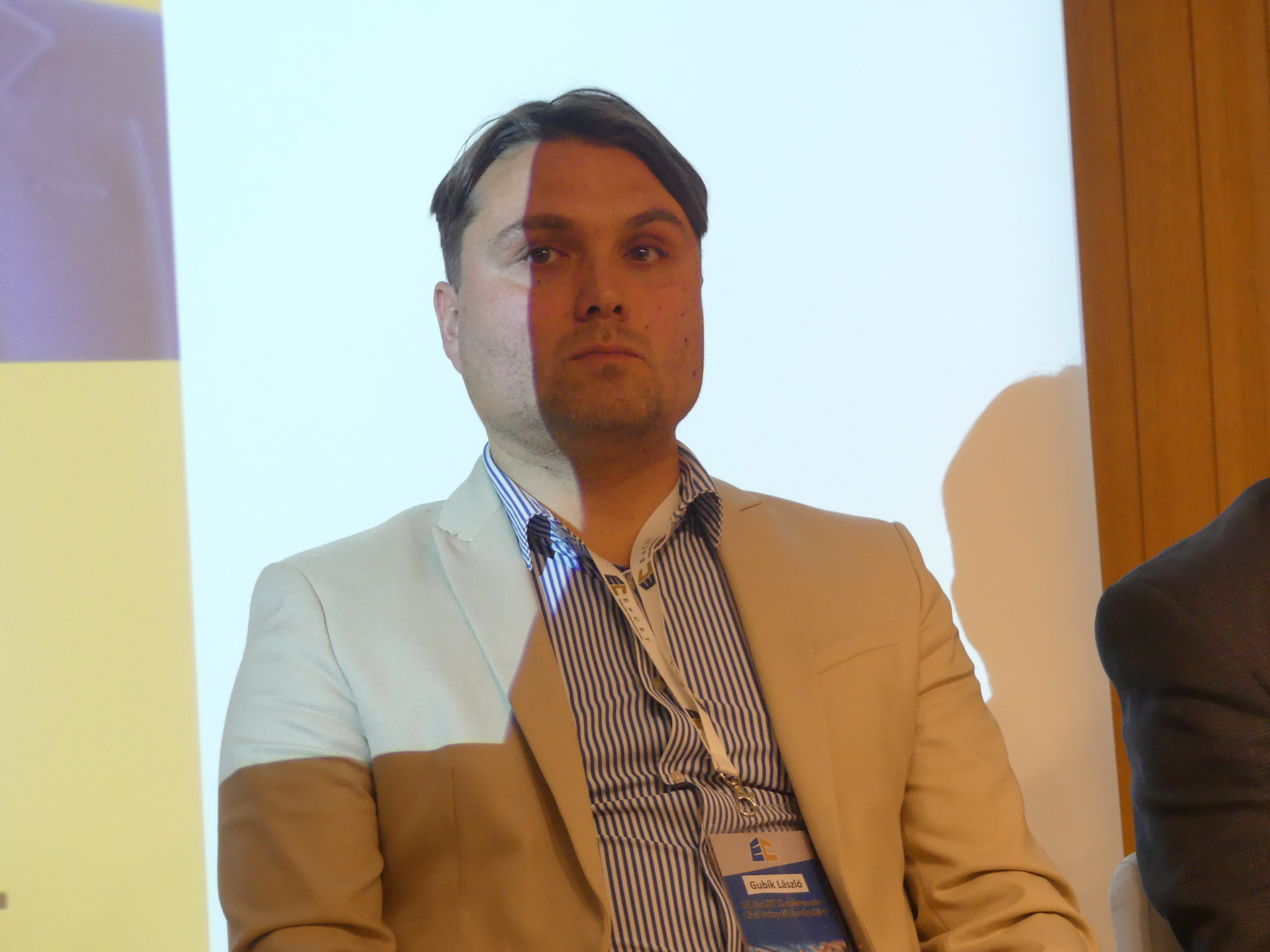

chairman Hungarian Alliance
- Incumbent
- Assumed office 28 September 2024
- Preceded by: Krisztián Forró

Personal details
- Born: Gubík László; 26 October 1986 (age 39) Levice, Czechoslovakia (now Slovakia)
- Citizenship: Czechoslovakia (1986–1992); Slovakia (1993–2011); Hungary (2011–2025); Slovakia (2025–)
- Party: Party of the Hungarian Community (2005–2019); Hungarian Alliance (2019–)
- Children: 1
- Education: Eötvös Loránd University
- Profession: politician, lawyer, activist

László Gubík (born 1986) is a Hungarian-Slovak activist, historian, lawyer, and politician living in Slovakia. Since September 2024, he has been the chairman of the political party Hungarian Alliance. He is also known as the founder and director of the Esterházy Academy and as the chairman of the Association for Common Goals (in Slovak: Združenia za spoločné ciele). In the past, he served as chairman of the youth organization Via Nova ICS.

In 2011, he accepted Hungarian citizenship, which led to the revocation of his Slovak citizenship. In June 2025, he regained Slovak citizenship.

== Biography ==
He was born on 28 September 1986 in Levice into a Hungarian family.

In 2006, he completed his secondary education at the Hungarian-language school in Levice. He subsequently studied law at Eötvös Loránd University (ELTE) in Budapest, and from 2009 to 2010 he completed a study stay at the University of Regensburg in Bavaria.

== Political career ==
=== Beginnings in Via Nova and SMK–MKP ===
He began his political activities in Via Nova ICS, the youth organization of the Party of the Hungarian Coalition (SMK–MKP), which he joined in 2005. He later worked as an activist and in 2007 became head of the SMK district organization in Levice. In 2011, he was elected chairman of Via Nova ICS, and in this position he was confirmed by the organization's congress in 2014.

He used his contacts in Hungary to establish cooperation with the then far-right party Jobbik. In 2012–2013, he took part in leadership training organized by the then far-right Jobbik, and the party's foundation also financially supported Via Nova events.

=== Acceptance of Hungarian citizenship ===
As a result of Gubík's decision to accept Hungarian citizenship in 2011, Slovak authorities revoked his Slovak citizenship, which for many years prevented him from running in elections in Slovakia. However, this step increased his media visibility and strengthened his political contacts in Hungary, especially with the right-wing faction of Fidesz.

=== Cooperation with Fidesz ===
In 2014, as a gesture of solidarity, he was placed in the symbolic 21st position on the candidate list of the right-wing coalition Fidesz–KDNP for the European Parliament elections in Hungary.

=== Activism and educational projects ===
Gubík founded and leads the Esterházy Academy in Martovce near Komárno, an educational center for young Hungarians in Slovakia with a focus on Hungarian history and cadre-based political education. He also organized the cultural-political festival MartFeszt, aimed at Hungarian youth, for which he obtained funding in Hungary. During this period, he was politically closest to the radical Fidesz politician László Kövér.

In 2020, he became chairman of the Association for Common Goals (in Slovak: Združenia za spoločné ciele), which manages the portal Felvidék.ma, focused on the community of Hungarians living outside Hungary's borders. The organization was founded by Miklós Duray, who directly handed over leadership to Gubík. The association belongs to a narrow group of organizations financed by Hungary.

Gubík gradually began coordinating these three institutions with the aim of strengthening political influence.

=== Hungarian Alliance ===
In the 2023 elections to the National Council, despite promising polling results, the Hungarian Alliance ended outside parliament with 4.38% of the vote. On 28 September 2024, Gubík was elected chairman of the party. In the 2024 European Parliament elections, the party received only 3.88%, which was insufficient to win a mandate. Gubík could not participate in these elections because he did not have Slovak citizenship at the time; he regained it only after the elections, in June 2025.

=== Political orientation after 2025 ===
At the beginning of 2025, Gubík declared that he was ready to cooperate with Péter Magyar if the Tisza party were to defeat Fidesz in parliamentary elections, and that in Slovakia he was prepared to enter a government with Progressive Slovakia.

During 2025, there was a visible political rapprochement between Gubík and the Christian Democratic Movement (KDH). He participated in the 36th annual ascent of Ďumbier organized by Christian Democratic Youth (KDMS). In the course of 2025, he was also active as a speaker at the Conservative Summit 2025 in Bratislava and at the Košice and Bratislava Hanus Days 2025, organized by the Ladislav Hanus Institute, which has personnel links to KDH. At the end of 2025, Gubík openly declared his political closeness to and willingness to cooperate with the political parties KDH and Christian Union (KÚ).

== Political relations and ideology ==
Gubík has close ties to the ideological wing of Fidesz, including László Kövér. In the past, he also cooperated with the radical Jobbik. He describes his political values as national, conservative, and Christian, and considers Christian socialism to be closest to him.

Among his historical role models are János Esterházy and Miklós Duray, whom he refers to as his "political grandfather."

== Controversies ==
In addition to the aforementioned close ties to radical politicians such as Kövér and Duray, and to the political environment of Viktor Orbán's Fidesz party, he is also known for irredentist allusions and ambiguous comments on territorial issues, for example regarding Ukraine or Slovakia.

In November 2021, when the then chairman of the Hungarian Alliance, Krisztián Forró, was banned from entering Ukraine, Gubík responded: "Never mind, Krisztián Forró! We'll still go to Mukachevo without a passport!" Later, in explaining the statement, he disagreed with the notion that Ukraine's territorial integrity is inviolable.

On the eve of the full-scale invasion of Ukraine by the Russian Federation in 2022, he shared a postcard from Mukachevo with the comment: "If Ukraine has already started a territorial diet, it could perhaps be slimmer by one more region. It can keep the rest."

Regarding autonomy in 2024, after being elected party chairman, he said: "Felvidék first. I believe in autonomous politics and an autonomous space in Felvidék (Upper Hungary). I do not consider us a governing party, nor an opposition party."

His participation in the Conservative Summit in November 2025 suggests a continuing political closeness between Gubík and radical conservative circles, as well as far-right and pro-Russian environments.
