= Ľudovít Goga =

Slovak businessman and politician

Member of the National Council
- In office 23 March 2016 – 25 October 2023

Personal details
- Born: 5 February 1969 (age 57) Bratislava, Czechoslovakia
- Party: We Are Family
- Education: University of Economics in Bratislava

Ľudovít Goga (born 5 February 1969) is a Slovak politician and businessman. From 2016 to 2023, he served as a Member of the National Council.

Goga was born on 5 February 1969 in Bratislava. He was raised by a single mother in humble conditions along with his half-brother Boris Kollár. He was educated at a grammar school in Bratislava and at the University of Economics in Bratislava, graduating in 1991. Following graduation he worked as a consultant for skiing resorts.

Goga entered politics along with his brother Boris Kollár. In the 2016 and 2020 elections, he was elected to the parliament on the list of the We Are Family party which was founded and led by Kollár.

In the parliament, Goga kept a rather low profile, being amongst the least known MPs. At the same time, he was the MP with the highest number of business trips, including to exotic destinations, which was a subject of criticism by political scientists. Within We are Family, Goga was in charge of developing foreign relations, in particular with the Identity and Democracy Party in the European Parliament.
