= 2024 Slovak presidential election =

- 23 March 2024 (first round); 6 April 2024 (second round)
- Opinion polls
- Turnout: 51.90% (first round) ▲3.16pp 61.12% (second round) ▲19.32pp
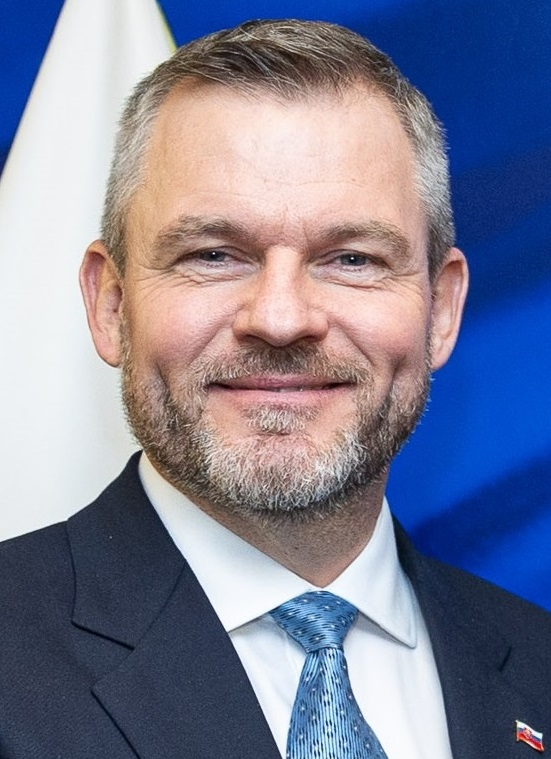

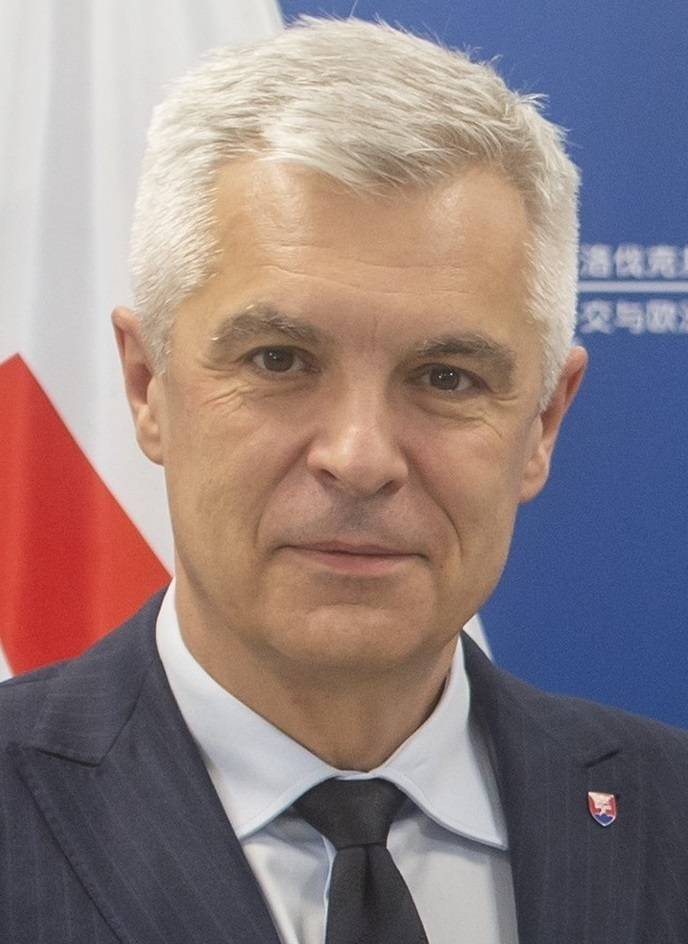
Nominee	Peter Pellegrini	Ivan Korčok
Party	Hlas	Independent
Popular vote	1,409,255	1,243,709
Percentage	53.12%	46.88%
President before election
Zuzana Čaputová
Independent
Elected President
Peter Pellegrini
Hlas

Presidential elections were held in Slovakia in March and April 2024. Incumbent president Zuzana Čaputová announced in June 2023 that she would not run for a second term.

In the first round held on 23 March, Ivan Korčok led with 43% of the votes followed by Peter Pellegrini with 37%. As no candidate received a majority, a runoff was scheduled between the two on 6 April. However, in the second round, Pellegrini defeated Korčok with 53% of the vote. He was sworn in as president on 15 June.Turnout was the highest in both rounds since the 1999 Slovak Presidential election, and the closest in history of direct presidential elections in Slovakia.

The election was widely regarded as a win for Slovakia's prime minister Robert Fico who saw his ally elected as President.

== Electoral system ==
The President of Slovakia is elected using the two-round system; if no candidate gains a majority in the first round, a runoff will be held between the top-two candidates.

== Candidates ==
=== Eligibility ===
Slovak citizens not sentenced for an intentional crime aged 40 or more are eligible to run for the office of president.

Each candidacy has to be supported by either 15 Members of the National Council of Slovakia or signatures of 15,000 citizens of Slovakia to be admissible. Candidates fulfilling eligibility criteria had until midnight 30 January 2024 to formally confirm their candidacy.

=== Official candidates ===
Name	Born	Public Office Experience	Affiliation and main endorsements	Alma mater and profession
Patrik Dubovský	1965 (age 58–59)		Affiliation: For the People; Endorsement: Slovakia, Christian Union	Comenius University historian
Krisztián Forró	31 January 1976 (age 48); Veľká Mača		Affiliation: Hungarian Alliance	Edutus University businessman
Štefan Harabin	4 May 1957 (age 66); Ľubica	Chairman of the Supreme Court (1998–2003, 2009–2014); Deputy Prime Minister of Slovakia (2006–2009); Minister of Justice (2006–2009)	Affiliation: Independent; Endorsement: Slovak National Party and other minor parties	Pavol Jozef Šafárik University judge
Ivan Korčok	4 April 1964 (age 59); Banská Bystrica	Minister of Foreign and European Affairs (2020–2022); Slovak Ambassador to the United States (2018–2020); Undersecretary of Foreign and European Affairs (2002–2005, 2015–2018); Slovak Ambassador to the European Union (2009–2015); Slovak Ambassador to Germany (2005–2009)	Affiliation: Independent; Endorsement: Progressive Slovakia, Christian Democratic Movement, Freedom and Solidarity and other minor parties	University of Economics in Bratislava, Comenius University diplomat
Marian Kotleba	7 April 1977 (age 46); Banská Bystrica	Member of the National Council (2016–2022); Governor of the Banská Bystrica Region (2013–2017)	Affiliation: Kotlebists – People's Party Our Slovakia	Matej Bel University teacher
Ján Kubiš	12 November 1952 (age 71); Bratislava	Minister of Foreign Affairs (2006–2009); Secretary General of the Organization for Security and Co-operation in Europe (1999–2005); Slovak Ambassador to the United Nations, General Agreement on Tariffs and Trade and other international organizations in Geneva (1993–1994)	Affiliation: Independent	Moscow State Institute of International Relations diplomat
Igor Matovič	11 May 1973 (age 50); Trnava	Member of the National Council (2010–2020, 2022–present); Deputy Prime Minister of Slovakia (2021–2022); Minister of Finance (2021–2022); Prime Minister of Slovakia (2020–2021)	Affiliation: Slovakia; Endorsement: Christian Union, For the People	Comenius University businessman
Milan Náhlik	1976 (age 47–48)		Affiliation: Independent	police officer
Peter Pellegrini	6 October 1975 (age 48); Banská Bystrica	Speaker of the National Council (2014–2016, 2023–2024); Member of the National Council (2006–2012, 2014–2016, 2020–2024); Deputy Speaker of the National Council (2020); Prime Minister of Slovakia (2018–2020); Deputy Prime Minister of Slovakia for Investment and Informatization (2016–2018); Minister of Education, Science, Research and Sport (2014); Undersecretary of Finance (2012–2014)	Affiliation: Voice – Social Democracy; Endorsement: Direction – Social Democracy	Matej Bel University, Technical University of Košice self-employed

=== Disqualified ===
- Marta Čurajová, lecturer, judicial reform advocate. Launched the campaign on 19 December 2023 as an independent candidate.
- Peter Kuťka, Entertainer, influencer. Launched the campaign on 12 December 2023 as an independent candidate.

=== Withdrawn ===
- Ján Drgonec, former justice of the Supreme Court, former MP for ANO. Announced candidacy in March 2023. Collection of required 15-thousand signatures was in progress as of November 2023. In January 2024, he stopped the signature collection.
- Beáta Janočková, civil and parental rights activist. Announced candidacy as an independent candidate on 13 November 2023, initiating the collection of 15-thousand signatures to support her candidacy.
- Miroslav Radačovský, MEP. Announced his candidacy on 10 January 2024. He withdrew his candidacy in early February.
- Andrej Danko, Deputy Speaker of the National Council. Withdrew candidacy on 18 March 2024 endorsing Štefan Harabin. Remained on the ballot.
- Róbert Švec, Chairman of the Slovak Revival Movement. Withdrew candidacy on 20 March 2024 endorsing Štefan Harabin. Remained on the ballot.

== Campaign ==
Milan Náhlik, Štefan Harabin, Marian Kotleba and Peter Pellegrini have expressed statements sympathetic with Russia in relation to its invasion of Ukraine and critical of the European Union, with Pellegrini supporting Ukraine opening negotiations with Russia. Meanwhile, Ivan Korčok has been supportive of the West and Ukrainian resistance against Russia. During the campaign, Pellegrini accused Korčok of being a warmonger who wants to send troops to Ukraine, which Korčok denied. Pellegrini also said that he was running for president "to rescue the government of [Prime Minister] Robert Fico." Fico also openly supported Pellegrini, calling him a “a moderate candidate who recognises the value of peace" and described Korčok as supporting "everything the West tells him without hesitation". Pellegrini and Fico's accusations were made despite the office of the president not having constitutional powers to deploy military forces abroad.

Korčok ran on the notion of "not letting Robert Fico take everything"

Following the results of the first round, Korčok said that he acknowledged a "need to reach out more to voters who supported the government parties,” adding that it was also clear that “they’re not satisfied with how this government is ruling, where it’s taking Slovakia.” Pellegrini congratulated Korčok for his first place and pledged to hold “several duels, as it should be” with Korčok before the second round, and “not to succumb” to an aggressive campaign style, having only engaged once in a debate prior to the first round of voting. He also noted that a majority of voters voted for nationalist candidates and not "a liberal, progressive" candidate, and predicted the second round of voting to be a tight race.

President Čaputová denounced war rhetoric used during the campaigning for the second round and defended both Pellegrini and Korčok from allegations that they were willing to deploy soldiers in Ukraine.

=== Endorsements ===
Candidate	Endorsement
Andrej Danko (Note: Candidate withdrew in favour of Harabin, but was still on the ballot.)	Peter Pellegrini
Patrik Dubovský	Ivan Korčok
Krisztián Forró	Peter Pellegrini
Štefan Harabin	No endorsement
Marian Kotleba	No endorsement
Ján Kubiš	Peter Pellegrini
Igor Matovič	Ivan Korčok
Milan Náhlik	Peter Pellegrinii
Róbert Švec	No endorsement

== Results ==
In the second round, Pellegrini carried 61 out of 79 districts.

Candidate	Party	First round		Second round	
Candidate	Party	Votes	%	Votes	%
Ivan Korčok	Independent	958,393	42.52	1,243,709	46.88
Peter Pellegrini	Voice – Social Democracy	834,718	37.03	1,409,255	53.12
Štefan Harabin	Independent	264,579	11.74		
Krisztián Forró	Hungarian Alliance	65,588	2.91		
Igor Matovič	Slovakia	49,201	2.18		
Ján Kubiš	Independent	45,957	2.04		
Patrik Dubovský	For the People	16,107	0.71		
Marian Kotleba	Kotlebists – People's Party Our Slovakia	12,771	0.57		
Milan Náhlik	Independent	3,111	0.14		
Andrej Danko	Slovak National Party	1,905	0.08		
Róbert Švec	Slovak Revival Movement	1,876	0.08		
Total		2,254,206	100.00	2,652,964	100.00
Valid votes		2,254,206	99.53	2,652,964	99.35
Invalid/blank votes		10,563	0.47	17,233	0.65
Total votes		2,264,769	100.00	2,670,197	100.00
Registered voters/turnout		4,364,071	51.90	4,368,697	61.12
Source: First Round, Second Round

== Aftermath ==
Following the results, Pellegrini pledged to be "a president of all Slovak citizens" and "be always by the side of Slovakia." Korčok conceded defeat and congratulated Pellegrini, while acknowledging that he was "disappointed" by the electoral result.

Pellegrini's victory is seen by analysts to be a gain for the government of Prime Minister Robert Fico, with Pellegrini having been acquiescent in Fico's efforts to overhaul the justice system, which had launched investigations into members of Fico's SMER party and place public broadcasting under state control, in addition to sharing his views on Ukraine and relations with Russia.
