= Petra Krištúfková =

Slovak politician (born 1977)

Member of the National Council
- In office 23 March 2016 – 25 October 2023

Personal details
- Born: 8 April 1977 (age 49) Bratislava, Czechoslovakia (now Slovakia)
- Party: We Are Family (Slovakia)
- Domestic partner(s): Róbert Dinič; Juraj Ondrejčák; Peter Havaši; Boris Kollár
- Children: 2
- Education: University of Central Europe

Petra Krištúfková (born 8 April 1977 in Bratislava) is a Slovak politician. She served as a member of the National Council from 2016 to 2023.

== Life ==
Krištúfková attended a Commerce Academy in Bratislava but did not graduate from high school due to becoming pregnant at the age of 17 with the mafia boss Róbert Dinič. She eventually did graduate high school in 2002. Following the killing of Dinič, Krištúfková was involved with other prominent mobsters Peter Havaši, Libor Jakšík and Juraj Ondrejčák. Due to the tendency of her romantic partners to die or become imprisoned in young age, Krištúfková became known as the "black widow of Slovak underworld".

In 2019, Krištúfková graduated in Environmental Protection at the University of Central Europe. Her final thesis was later found to be entirely plagiarized.

=== Political career ===
In 2015, Krištúfková joined the new party We are family, founded by the businessman Boris Kollár, her former romantic partner and father of her younger daughter. The following year, in 2016 Slovak parliamentary election Krištúfková got elected to the National Council. As an MP she served in the committee for overseeing military intelligence, nonetheless in 2018 she was removed from the post due to her connections to organized crime.

Krištúfková was returned to the National Council in the 2020 Slovak parliamentary election. After the election, she was nominated for the newly created post of Government representative for Family by the Labor Minister Milan Krajniak. Her nomination was criticized by the Slovak Member of the European Parliament Michal Šimečka who pointed out her past mafia connections, lack of education ane experience. Krištúfková resigned the post after only four days when it became known that she spent her 2009 summer holiday on the yacht of the convinced criminal Marián Kočner despite claiming she had never met him.
