= Kozárovce =

Kozárovce Garamkovácsi
- Municipality
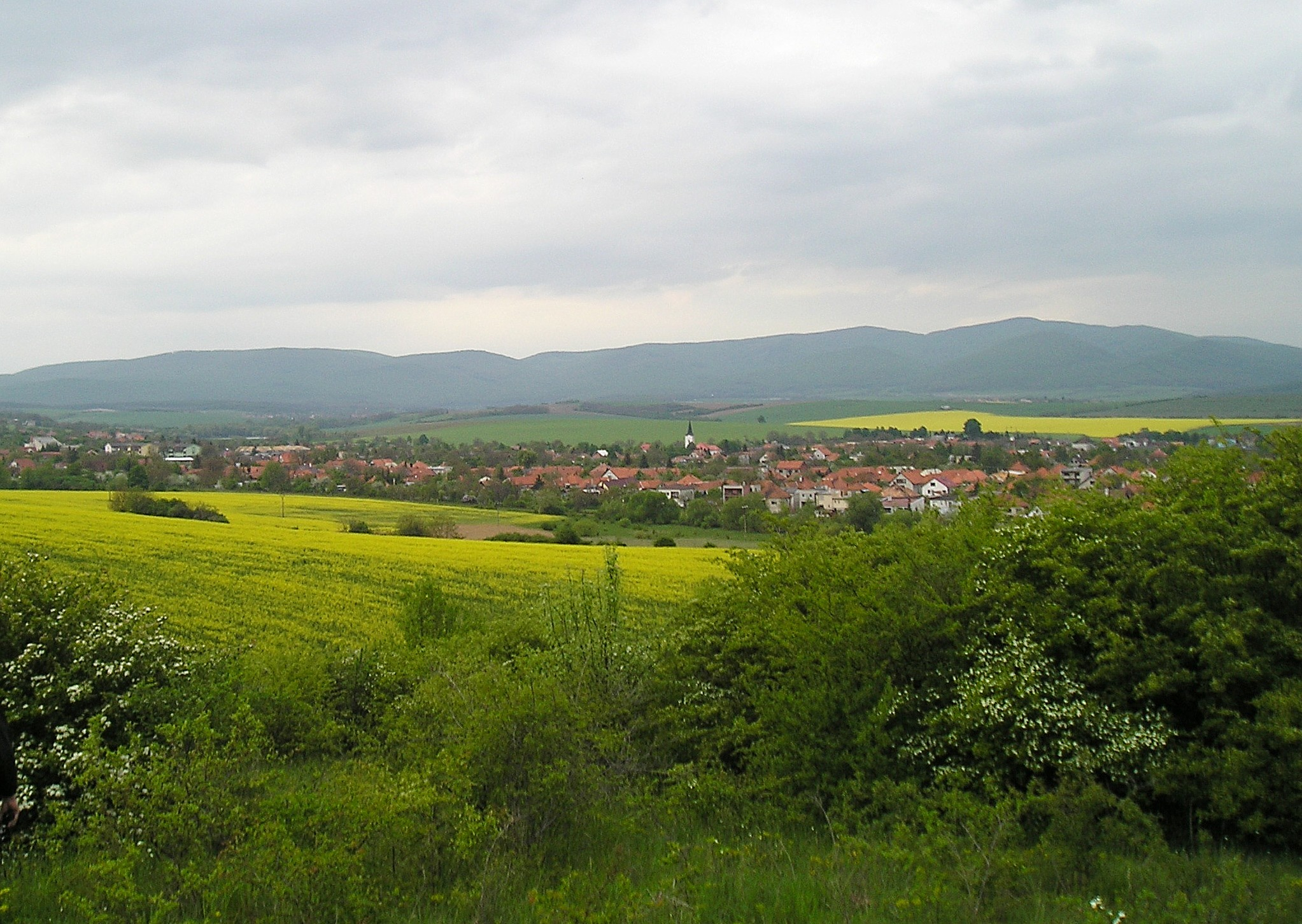
- Kozárovce from the south

- Flag Coat of arms

- Location of Kozárovce in the Nitra Region Location of Kozárovce in Slovakia
- Coordinates: 48.32°N 18.53°E
- Country: Slovakia
- Region: Nitra Region
- District: Levice District
- First mentioned: 1075

Area
  - Total: 21.82 km^{2} (8.42 sq mi)
- Elevation: 187 m (614 ft)

Population (2025)
  - Total: 2,063
- Time zone: UTC+1 (CET)
  - Summer (DST): UTC+2 (CEST)
- Postal code: 935 22
- Area code: +421 36
- Vehicle registration plate (until 2022): LV
- Website: www.kozarovce.sk

Kozárovce (Hungarian: Garamkovácsi) is an old village and municipality in the Levice District in the Nitra Region of Slovakia.

== History ==
In historical records the village was first mentioned in 1075.

== Geography ==
The municipality lies at an altitude of 187 metres (614 ft) and covers an area of 21.82 km^{2} (8.42 sq mi) (2025).

== Population ==
Population statistic (10 years)
Year	1995	2005	2015	2025
Count	1881	1979	2038	2063
Difference		+5.20%	+2.98%	+1.22%

Population statistic
Year	2024	2025
Count	2080	2063
Difference		−0.81%

It has a population of 2063 people (31 December 2025).

=== Ethnicity ===
Census 2021 (1+ %)
Ethnicity	Number	Fraction
Slovak	1960	94.14%
Romani	163	7.82%
Not found out	95	4.56%
Total	2082	

In year 2021 was 2082 people by ethnicity 1960 as Slovak, 163 as Romani, 95 as Not found out, 15 as Hungarian, 12 as Czech, 4 as Vietnamese, 4 as Russian and 1 as German.

Note on population: The difference values of population numbers in the table "Population statistic" and in the sections "Ethnicity" & "Religion" is caused by the use of various statistical methods.

=== Religion ===
Census 2021 (1+ %)
Religion	Number	Fraction
Roman Catholic Church	1634	78.48%
None	281	13.5%
Not found out	102	4.9%
Total	2082	

In year 2021 was 2082 people by religion 1634 from Roman Catholic Church, 281 from None, 102 from Not found out, 15 from Evangelical Church, 13 from Other, 7 from Christian Congregations in Slovakia, 6 from Calvinist Church, 5 from Apostolic Church, 5 from Ad hoc movements, 4 from Paganism and natural spirituality, 4 from Greek Catholic Church, 2 from Other and not ascertained christian church, 2 from Buddhism, 1 from Eastern Orthodox Church and 1 from Islam.

The village is approximately 94% Slovak 5% Romani and almost 1% Hungarian.

== Government ==
The village has its own birth registry.

== Facilities ==
The village has a public library a gym, swimming pool and soccer pitch. It also has a cinema.

== Genealogical resources ==
The records for genealogical research are available at the state archive "Statny Archiv in Banska Bystrica, Slovakia"

- Roman Catholic church records (births/marriages/deaths): 1826-1910 (parish B)

== Notable people ==
- Martina Holečková (born 1984), politician

== See also ==
- List of municipalities and towns in Slovakia
