= Dalibor Cicman =

Slovak businessman (born 1987)

- Dalibor Cicman
- Born: 15 April 1987 (age 39)
- Education: Bratislava University of Economics and Business; Pavol Jozef Šafárik University; Stanford University

Dalibor Cicman (born 15 April 1987) is a businessman who launched the company GymBeam that manufactures and sells sports nutrition, sportswear, and accessories. Cicman owns about 71 percent of the company's shares; before the 2025 funding round he held 83.25 percent. He also founded the logistics platform Boxpi. In 2025 he was included for the first time in the Forbes list of the richest Slovaks, with an estimated wealth of €150 million.

== Early life and education ==
Cicman was born on 15 April 1987 as the eldest son in family of entrepreneurs. As a child he went to a computer club and later to a programming club. He later used these skills to build websites on commission. In 2004 he started studying corporate financial management at the University of Economics in Bratislava, and later also studied applied informatics at Pavol Jozef Šafárik University in Košice at the same time. After receiving an engineering degree he went on to doctoral studies on implementing business intelligence systems in e-commerce. He founded GymBeam in Košice in 2014, during his doctoral studies. In 2021 he completed the Leadership Strategies programme at Stanford University.

== Career ==
Cicman started out programming websites on commission while still at school. By 2013 he was running e-commerce projects on 15 domains, which he sold off between 2013 and 2015.

=== GymBeam ===
He founded GymBeam on 1 May 2014, and a few months later the company bought the Slovak supplement brand BodyFit. In 2015 it entered the Czech and Hungarian markets. In 2018 the website Startitup named Cicman its Personality of the Year, and the same year he was included in the Slovak Forbes 30 Under 30 list. In 2020 GymBeam received €6 million from the Crowdberry platform and the state-owned Slovak Investment Holding. The same year Cicman was nominated for the Krištáľové krídlo award in the innovation and start-ups category and was a finalist of EY Entrepreneur of the Year in Slovakia. In 2022 the company's annual revenue passed €100 million. In 2023 Cicman received the Entrepreneur of the Year award of the Košice Region and won the national EY Entrepreneur of the Year 2023 award. GymBeam closed 2024 with consolidated revenue of €224 million, and in early 2025 it operated in 16 countries.

As the winner of the Slovak round, Cicman represented Slovakia at the EY World Entrepreneur of the Year 2024 final in Monte Carlo. In 2025 he entered the Forbes list of the richest Slovaks for the first time, in 35th place, with an estimated wealth of €150 million. The same year he received the E-commerce Personality of the Year award at the Upterdam Awards in Bratislava. In March 2026 a Forbes survey of chief executives of Slovak companies named him the most respected CEO of 2025.

At the end of 2025 GymBeam closed a €30 million funding round in which PortfoLion Capital Partners and the European Bank for Reconstruction and Development (EBRD) became shareholders; Rothschild & Co advised GymBeam on the deal. Cicman remained the majority shareholder. In December 2025 GymBeam bought KAJA Food, a German food manufacturer based near Düsseldorf with annual production of over €20 million. In February 2026 the company opened an automated distribution warehouse near Milan, which cost €32 million and uses 85 robots. According to Trending Topics, the GymBeam group had consolidated revenue of about €260 million in 2025. In 2026 GymBeam moved its headquarters to Vienna.

In 2025 Cicman founded Boxpi, a logistics platform for small and medium-sized online shops that builds on infrastructure originally developed for GymBeam. In its first year the service delivered almost five million parcels across Europe.

== Personal life ==
Cicman has been married to Mária Cicmanová since 2016, and they have one child. He lived in Košice, and since GymBeam moved its headquarters to Vienna in 2026 he has lived mainly in Vienna. He is a member of the Young Presidents' Organization (YPO), an international organization of chief executives of large companies.

Cicman supports education through the Dalibor Cicman Foundation. In 2025 the foundation donated €50,000 to Skyro, a Bratislava secondary school focused on artificial intelligence, to fund an online study programme.
