= GymBeam =

European fitness brand

GymBeam s.r.o.
- Type: retail and wholesale
- Founded: May 1, 2014
- Founder: Dalibor Cicman
- Headquarters: Košice, Slovakia Slovakia
- Area served: Czech Republic, Slovakia, Hungary, Romania, Croatia, Bulgaria, Ukraine, Slovenia, Poland, Germany, Greece, Serbia, Bosnia and Herzegovina, Italy, Austria, Switzerland
- Key people: Dalibor Cicman
- Production output: sports nutrition, healthy foods, fitness clothing, fitness accessories
- Revenue: ▲175 000 000 € (2023)
- Operating income: ▲11 082 012 € (2023, Slovakia)
- Total assets: ▲46 776 769 € (2023)
- Owner: Dalibor Cicman
- Number of employees: 535 (2023)
- Website: gymbeam.com

GymBeam is a fitness e-shop in Central and Eastern Europe which focuses on selling sports nutrition, healthy foods, fitness clothing, and accessories. Its portfolio includes over 9,000 products of its own production. The company was founded in Slovakia (as GymBeam.sk) in 2014 by Dalibor Cicman, who is the CEO. Since then, it has been based in Košice.

Since its founding, it has expanded into other Central and Eastern European countries. In 2025, it operated in 16 markets, including Slovakia, Hungary, Czechia, Romania, Croatia, Bulgaria, Ukraine, Slovenia, Poland, Germany, Greece, Serbia, Bosnia and Herzegovina, Austria, Switzerland, and Italy.

The company is led by founder Dalibor Cicman, with the management team also including Mária Cicmanová (CMO) and Róbert Čižmár (CTO).

== History ==
Dalibor Cicman came up with the idea to start GymBeam in 2013. The GymBeam.sk website was launched on May 1, 2014, and by December that year, the company had acquired the Slovak brand BodyFit, which it gradually transformed into GymBeam. Its first own product was the Magnum protein.

In February 2015, GymBeam expanded into the Hungarian (GymBeam.hu) and Czech markets (GymBeam.cz). By 2017, the company had established its headquarters on Rastislavova Street in Košice, where it also built its own sports nutrition warehouse covering an area of 7,740 m^{2} which is planned to be expanded. That same year, GymBeam migrated to the Magento 2.0 system and won the Shop of the Year award from Heureka.sk, continuing to receive additional awards in the competition every year since. June 2018 saw the launch of its first sub-brand, BeastPink. In August 2019, GymBeam secured a Slovak e-commerce investment worth 6 million euros through the CrowdBerry platform.

In 2020, during the COVID-19 pandemic, GymBeam adapted to changing demand by expanding its portfolio with vitamins, home workout accessories, and long shelf-life foods. The year 2021 was marked by further development, as the company automated its logistics, launched a new pick-up zone in its central warehouse, and purchased production lines for its own products. Additionally, it launched an internal platform called Boxpi, which connects e-commerce with payment and delivery methods and van drivers transporting goods across borders within the CEE region. That year, GymBeam also aired its first television commercial in Slovakia.

== Finance ==
GymBeam s.r.o in numbers
	2014	2015	2016	2017	2018	2019	2020	2021	2022	2023
Revenue (€)	250 392	2 467 767	5 000 067	10 000 408	13 455 734	19 578 499	34 795 660	54 106 437	87 902 536	135 019 537
Net profit (€)	–	25 291	34 999	39 024	83 680	106 465	182 739	2 042 711	3 045 791	11 082 012
Website traffic	81 070	2 114 308	4 425 576	7 640 097	11 575 560	17 849 012	34 256 645	43 502 684	51 287 409	
Number of employees	6	12	25	45	85	130	220	280	355	535

== Achievements ==
- 2015: winner of the MastersGate competition, Jumpers category
- 2017: 1st place in the Shop of the Year 2017 competition, Quality Award category: Sports Nutrition and Quality Award category: Sports and Fitness.
- 2018: Dalibor Cicman ranked in the Forbes 30 under 30 list, GymBeam 1st place in the Shop of the Year 2018 competition, Quality Award category: Sports Nutrition, Popularity Award category: Sports and Fitness, and Quality Award category: Sports and Fitness.
- 2019: 1st place in the Shop of the Year 2019 competition, Quality Award category: Sports Nutrition and Quality Award category: Sports and Fitness.
- 2020: 1st place in the Shop of the Year 2020 competition, Quality Award category: Sports Nutrition, Popularity Award category: Sports and Fitness, and Quality Award category: Sports and Fitness.
- 2021: 2nd place in the ranking of the best customer service e-shops in Slovakia.
- 2022: 1st place in the Shop of the Year Quality Award for Sports Nutrition and 2nd place in the Quality Award category for Sports and Fitness.
- 2023: 1st place in the Shop of the Year Quality Award, Sports Nutrition category.
- 2024: 1st place in the Shop of the Year Quality Award for Sports Nutrition and 2nd place in the Quality Award category for Sports and Fitness.
