= EPICODE Institute of Technology =

European higher education institution

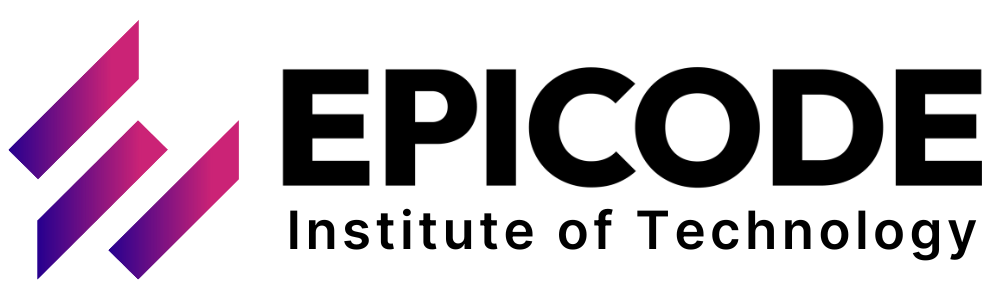
- Established: October 15, 2020; 4 years ago
- Focus: EdTech, Higher education
- Key people: Ivan Ranza (CEO); Guido Saracco (Chief Advisor on Education)
- Formerly called: Epicode (2020–2024)
- Location: Rome (Italy), Malta, Berlin (Germany)
- Website: epicode.com/en/

EPICODE Institute of Technology, commonly referred to as EPICODE, is a private European higher education Institution. It offers accredited degree programs, professional bootcamps, and corporate training. It provides vocational programs in Italian and English, for which it offers distance or blended learning in the areas of software development, data science, artificial intelligence, cybersecurity, digital marketing, game development and business. By 2025, EPICODE had trained over 6,500 students from more than 20 countries and partnered with over 1,000 companies, including Google, Vodafone, and Deloitte.

== History ==
The company was founded as "Epicode" during the pandemic on October 15, 2020, by Ivan Ranza, Marco Rosci, Claudio Vaccaro and Andrea Febbraio. It began by offering intensive technology education programs in Italy.

In 2021, the company raised a seed round of €700,000 and expanded its online bootcamps, training its first 1,000 students. In 2022, EPICODE acquired Strive School, a Berlin-based coding bootcamp, which supported its international expansion and the addition of programs in data science and cybersecurity. That same year, the company raised a Series A investment of €10 million.

In 2023, the research firm HolonIQ listed EPICODE among its Top 30 most innovative EdTech companies in Europe.

The company rebranded to "EPICODE Institute of Technology" in 2024 after it was officially accredited as a Higher Education Institution in Malta. Following the accreditation, it launched its first bachelor's degree in computer engineering and artificial intelligence.

At the same year, Guido Saracco, former Rector of the Politecnico di Torino, joined as Chief Advisor on Education.

In 2025, EPICODE was included in several rankings. The Financial Times placed it in the FT1000, ranking it second in the education sector among Europe's fastest-growing companies. TIME Magazine included it in its list of the World's Top EdTech Companies, and it was also recognized by Italian newspaper Il Sole 24 Ore. In the same year, the institution launched a bachelor's degree in business, economics and technology and a bachelor's degree in cybersecurity.

== Operations ==
EPICODE Institute of Technology's areas of training include, artificial intelligence, cybersecurity, software development, data analysis and marketing technology. The institution has reported training more than 6,500 students from over 20 countries.

It works with a network of more than 1,000 corporate partners for employee training and student job placement. These partners include Google, Vodafone, Intesa Sanpaolo, Capgemini, Deloitte, Almaviva, Jakala, EY, and Telecom Italia.
