= Žakovce =

- Municipality
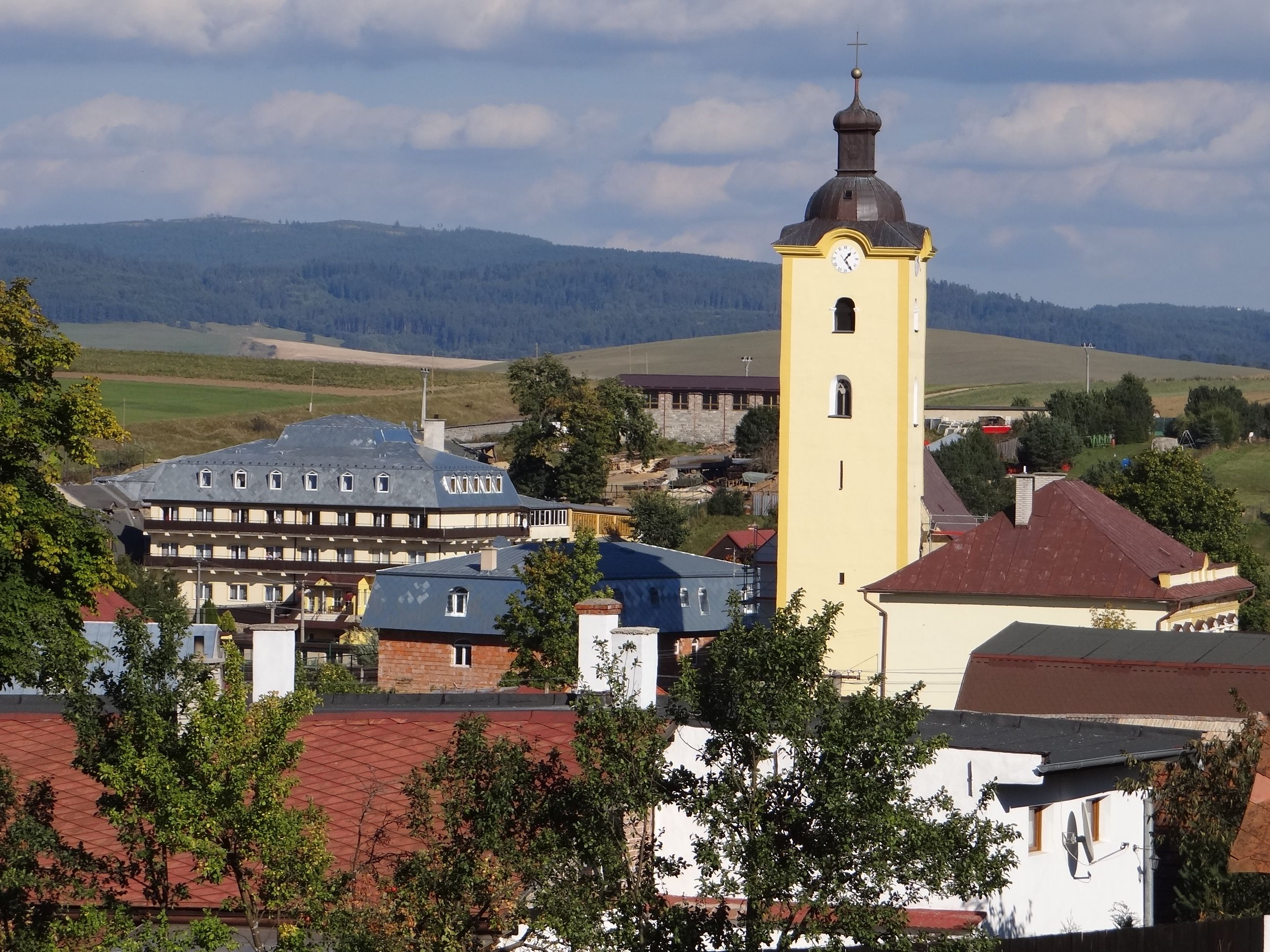

- Flag

- Location of Žakovce in the Prešov Region Location of Žakovce in Slovakia
- Coordinates: 49.08°N 20.40°E
- Country: Slovakia
- Region: Prešov Region
- District: Kežmarok District
- First mentioned: 1209

Area
  - Total: 16.03 km^{2} (6.19 sq mi)
- Elevation: 665 m (2,182 ft)

Population (2025)
  - Total: 863
- Time zone: UTC+1 (CET)
  - Summer (DST): UTC+2 (CEST)
- Postal code: 597 3
- Area code: +421 52
- Vehicle registration plate (until 2022): KK
- Website: www.obeczakovce.sk

Žakovce (Hungarian: Izsákfalva, German: Eisdorf) is a village and municipality in Kežmarok District in the Prešov Region of north Slovakia.

== History ==
In historical records the village was first mentioned in 1209. It was a village inhabited by Carpathian Germans from its foundation till January 1945.

== Geography ==
The municipality lies at an altitude of 665 metres (2,182 ft) and covers an area of 16.03 km^{2} (6.19 sq mi) (2025).

== Population ==
Population statistic (10 years)
Year	1995	2005	2015	2025
Count	577	724	872	863
Difference		+25.47%	+20.44%	−1.03%

Population statistic
Year	2024	2025
Count	863	863
Difference		−1.42%

It has a population of 863 people (31 December 2025).

=== Ethnicity ===
Census 2021 (1+ %)
Ethnicity	Number	Fraction
Slovak	812	93.01%
Rusyn	70	8.01%
Not found out	43	4.92%
Total	873	

In year 2021 was 873 people by ethnicity 812 as Slovak, 70 as Rusyn, 43 as Not found out, 6 as Czech, 4 as Russian, 3 as Ukrainian, 2 as German, 1 as Romani, 1 as Polish, 1 as Hungarian and 1 as Other.

Note on population: The difference values of population numbers in the table "Population statistic" and in the sections "Ethnicity" & "Religion" is caused by the use of various statistical methods.

=== Religion ===
Census 2021 (1+ %)
Religion	Number	Fraction
Roman Catholic Church	548	62.77%
Greek Catholic Church	186	21.31%
None	52	5.96%
Not found out	39	4.47%
Eastern Orthodox Church	22	2.52%
Evangelical Church	17	1.95%
Total	873	

In year 2021 was 873 people by religion 548 from Roman Catholic Church, 186 from Greek Catholic Church, 52 from None, 39 from Not found out, 22 from Eastern Orthodox Church, 17 from Evangelical Church, 2 from Christian Congregations in Slovakia, 2 from Apostolic Church, 2 from Ad hoc movements, 1 from Calvinist Church, 1 from Other and not ascertained christian church and 1 from Buddhism.

== Culture ==
The village was portrayed in the 2014 documentary film Lean a Ladder Against Heaven by Jana Ševčíková.

== Sources ==
- History Webpage by Thomas Reimer
- Historical website, based on the 2009 Eisdorf-Book.
- "800 Jahre Eisdorf: Erstes deutsches Dorf unter der Hohen Tatra," Inge Schmidt, ed., (Bietigheim-Bissigheim: Arbeitsgemeinschaft Eisdorf, 2009). Published by the association of the pre-1945 inhabitants and their descendants.
- "Osemstoročne Žakovce", Ivan Chalupecky & kol., Kežmarok: Vivit 2009. While the German book focuses on the 750 years of German life in Eisdorf, the Slovak book focuses more on the 50 years of Slovak/Ruthenian life of the new settlers, who mainly came from the village of Blažov, cleared to become part of the military training area of Javorina. The two groups met in 2009 in a moving 800 year celebration.
