= Nižný Hrabovec =

- Municipality
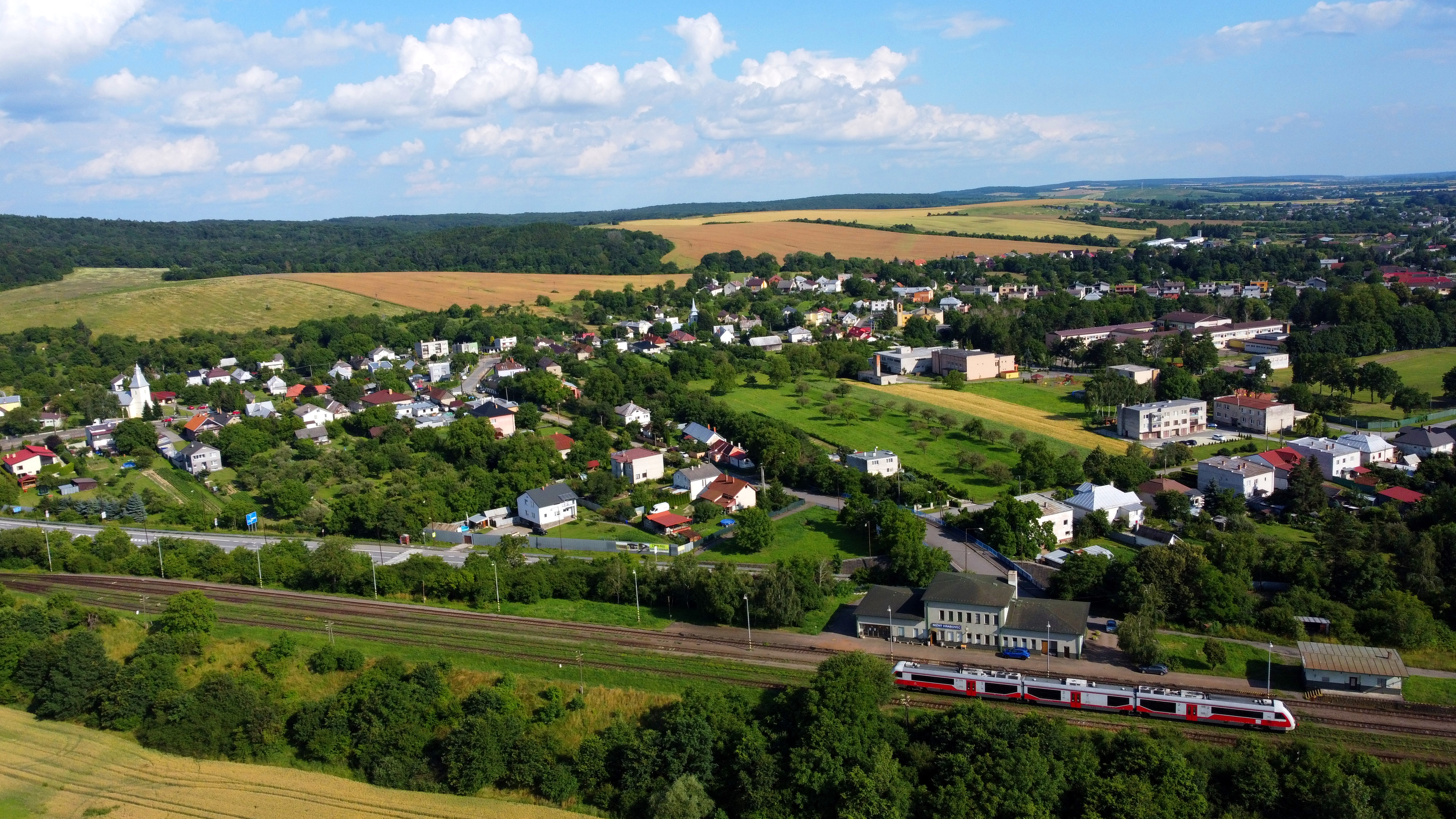

- Flag Coat of arms

- Location of Nižný Hrabovec in the Prešov Region Location of Nižný Hrabovec in Slovakia
- Coordinates: 48.85°N 21.77°E
- Country: Slovakia
- Region: Prešov Region
- District: Vranov nad Topľou District
- First mentioned: 1357

Area
  - Total: 10.79 km^{2} (4.17 sq mi)
- Elevation: 126 m (413 ft)

Population (2025)
  - Total: 1,547
- Time zone: UTC+1 (CET)
  - Summer (DST): UTC+2 (CEST)
- Postal code: 942 1
- Area code: +421 57
- Vehicle registration plate (until 2022): VT
- Website: www.niznyhrabovec.sk

Nižný Hrabovec (Hungarian: Alsógyertyán, until 1899: Alsó-Hrabócz; earlier i.a.: Slovak Nižssí Hrabowec/Hungarian Alsóhrabóc) is a village and municipality in the Vranov nad Topľou District in the Prešov Region of Slovakia.

== Geography ==
The municipality lies at an altitude of 126 metres (413 ft) and covers an area of 10.79 km^{2} (4.17 sq mi) (2025).

== Population ==
Population statistic (10 years)
Year	1995	2005	2015	2025
Count	1377	1609	1643	1547
Difference		+16.84%	+2.11%	−5.84%

Population statistic
Year	2024	2025
Count	1570	1547
Difference		−1.46%

It has a population of 1547 people (31 December 2025).

=== Ethnicity ===
Census 2021 (1+ %)
Ethnicity	Number	Fraction
Slovak	1446	88.98%
Not found out	166	10.21%
Romani	90	5.53%
Total	1625	

In year 2021 was 1625 people by ethnicity 1446 as Slovak, 166 as Not found out, 90 as Romani, 14 as Rusyn, 5 as Czech, 1 as Irish, 1 as Ukrainian, 1 as Russian, 1 as Romanian, 1 as Polish, 1 as Hungarian and 1 as Greek.

Note on population: The difference values of population numbers in the table "Population statistic" and in the sections "Ethnicity" & "Religion" is caused by the use of various statistical methods.

=== Religion ===
Census 2021 (1+ %)
Religion	Number	Fraction
Roman Catholic Church	1027	63.2%
Greek Catholic Church	279	17.17%
Not found out	153	9.42%
None	117	7.2%
Evangelical Church	22	1.35%
Total	1625	

In year 2021 was 1625 people by religion 1027 from Roman Catholic Church, 279 from Greek Catholic Church, 153 from Not found out, 117 from None, 22 from Evangelical Church, 6 from Eastern Orthodox Church, 6 from Jehovah's Witnesses, 6 from Christian Congregations in Slovakia, 5 from Calvinist Church, 2 from Ad hoc movements, 1 from Other and 1 from United Methodist Church.
