= Malý Horeš =

Municipality of Slovakia

Malý Horeš Kisgéres
- Municipality
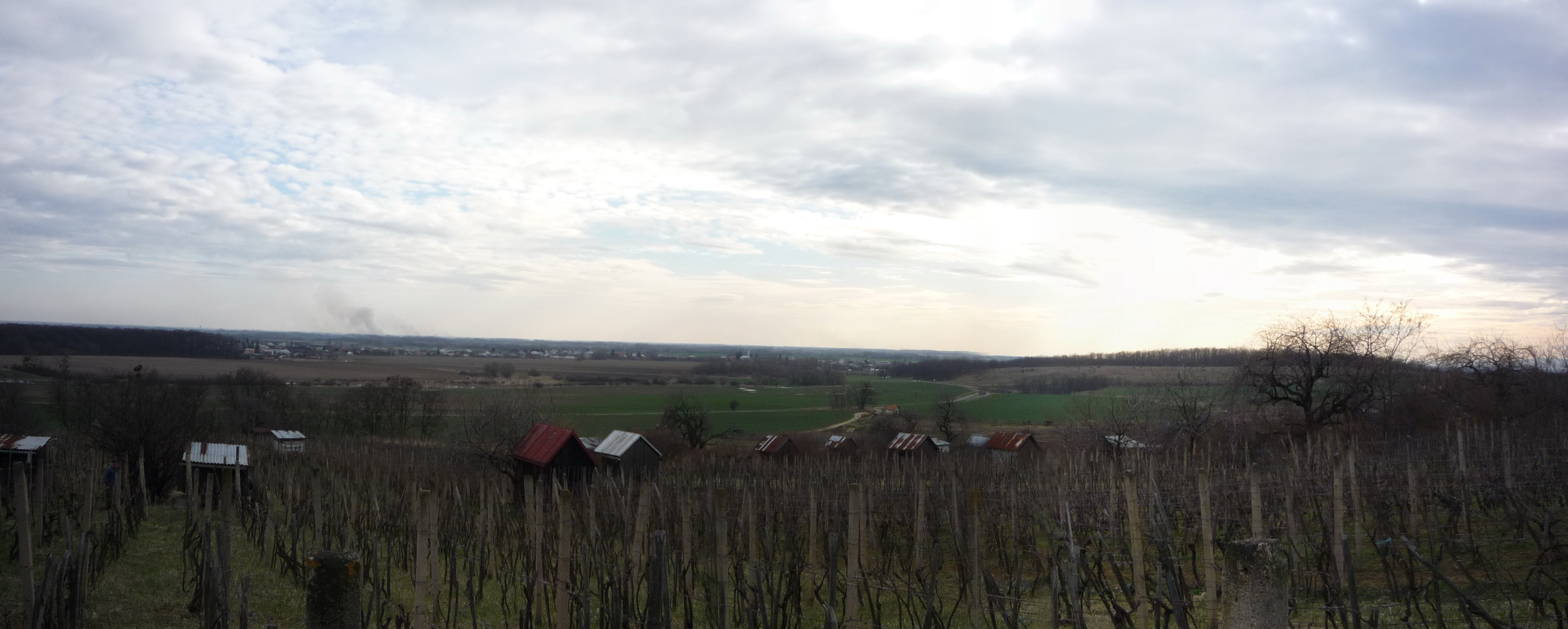

- Flag

- Location of Malý Horeš in the Košice Region Location of Malý Horeš in Slovakia
- Coordinates: 48.40°N 21.95°E
- Country: Slovakia
- Region: Košice Region
- District: Trebišov District
- First mentioned: 1214

Area
  - Total: 19.20 km^{2} (7.41 sq mi)
- Elevation: 99 m (325 ft)

Population (2025)
  - Total: 1,060
- Time zone: UTC+1 (CET)
  - Summer (DST): UTC+2 (CEST)
- Postal code: 765 2
- Area code: +421 56
- Vehicle registration plate (until 2022): TV
- Website: www.malyhores.sk

Malý Horeš (Hungarian: Kisgéres) is a village and municipality in the Trebišov District in the Košice Region of south-eastern Slovakia.

== History ==
In historical records the village was first mentioned in 1214.

== Geography ==
The municipality lies at an altitude of 99 metres (325 ft) and covers an area of 19.20 km^{2} (7.41 sq mi) (2025).

== Population ==
Population statistic (10 years)
Year	1995	2005	2015	2025
Count	1158	1120	1100	1060
Difference		−3.28%	−1.78%	−3.63%

Population statistic
Year	2024	2025
Count	1068	1060
Difference		−0.74%

It has a population of 1060 people (31 December 2025).

=== Ethnicity ===
Census 2021 (1+ %)
Ethnicity	Number	Fraction
Hungarian	1009	92.48%
Slovak	100	9.16%
Not found out	56	5.13%
Total	1091	

In year 2021 was 1091 people by ethnicity 1009 as Hungarian, 100 as Slovak, 56 as Not found out, 1 as Czech, 1 as Ukrainian, 1 as Romani, 1 as Rusyn and 1 as Russian.

Note on population: The difference values of population numbers in the table "Population statistic" and in the sections "Ethnicity" & "Religion" is caused by the use of various statistical methods.

=== Religion ===
Census 2021 (1+ %)
Religion	Number	Fraction
Calvinist Church	729	66.82%
Roman Catholic Church	116	10.63%
Jehovah's Witnesses	99	9.07%
None	47	4.31%
Greek Catholic Church	46	4.22%
Not found out	27	2.47%
Evangelical Church	17	1.56%
Total	1091	

In year 2021 was 1091 people by religion 729 from Calvinist Church, 116 from Roman Catholic Church, 99 from Jehovah's Witnesses, 47 from None, 46 from Greek Catholic Church, 27 from Not found out, 17 from Evangelical Church, 6 from Ad hoc movements, 3 from Other and not ascertained christian church and 1 from Christian Congregations in Slovakia.

== Facilities ==
The village has a public library and a football pitch
