= Martina Holečková =

Slovak politician (born 1984)

Martina Bajo Holečková

Member of the National Council
- Incumbent
- Assumed office 25 October 2023

Personal details
- Born: Martina Holečková; 6 February 1984 (age 42) Kozárovce, Czechoslovakia
- Party: Christian Democratic Movement (2016–2024); Independent (Parliamentary group Freedom and Solidarity) (2025–)
- Children: 2
- Education: University of Trnava

Martina Bajo Holečková (born 6 February 1984) is a Slovak politician. Since 2023 she has served as a Member of the National Council of Slovakia.

== Early life and career ==
Holečková was born on 6 February 1984 in the village of Kozárovce, where she still resides. She studied law at the University of Trnava. Holečková has worked for the Pallottines missions as a manager of development projects in Slovakia and Sub-Saharan Africa. She is also active as a mediator.

== Political career ==
Holečková became a member of the municipal council in Kozárovce from 2014 until 2022. She became a member of Christian Democratic Movement in 2016 and its party leadership council in 2020.

In 2017, Holečková became a member of the assembly of the Nitra Region in 2017. She ran for the post of governor in the 2022 Slovak regional elections, finishing fourth with 15.65% of the vote. She retained her regional assembly seat and became the Deputy Governor.

Holečková won a parliamentary seat in the 2023 Slovak parliamentary election, after which she became chairwoman of the Christian Democratic Movement's parliamentary faction. In the parliament, she let the opposition to the government reform of the Criminal Code, which decreased the length of the statute of limitation for rape. In an emotional appeal, Holečková begged her fellow MPs to consider the impact on the victims of sexual violence.

In June 2024, Holečková was replaced as the chair of the parliamentary faction by Marián Čaučík after saying in an interview that she is not personally interested in changing the status quo in the legality of abortion. In September 2024 Holečková announced she left the Christian Democratic Movement due to ideological disagreements with the party leadership.

In January 2025, Holečková announced she joined the Freedom and Solidarity party.

== Personal life ==
In October 2024 Holečková married and started using her married name Martina Bajo Holečková. She has a son from a previous relationship. In November 2024, she announced she was expecting her second baby with her husband.

Holečková resides in her hometown of Kozárovce. In addition to her native Slovak language, she is fluent in English, French and Polish.
