= Jozef Banáš =

Slovak writer and politician

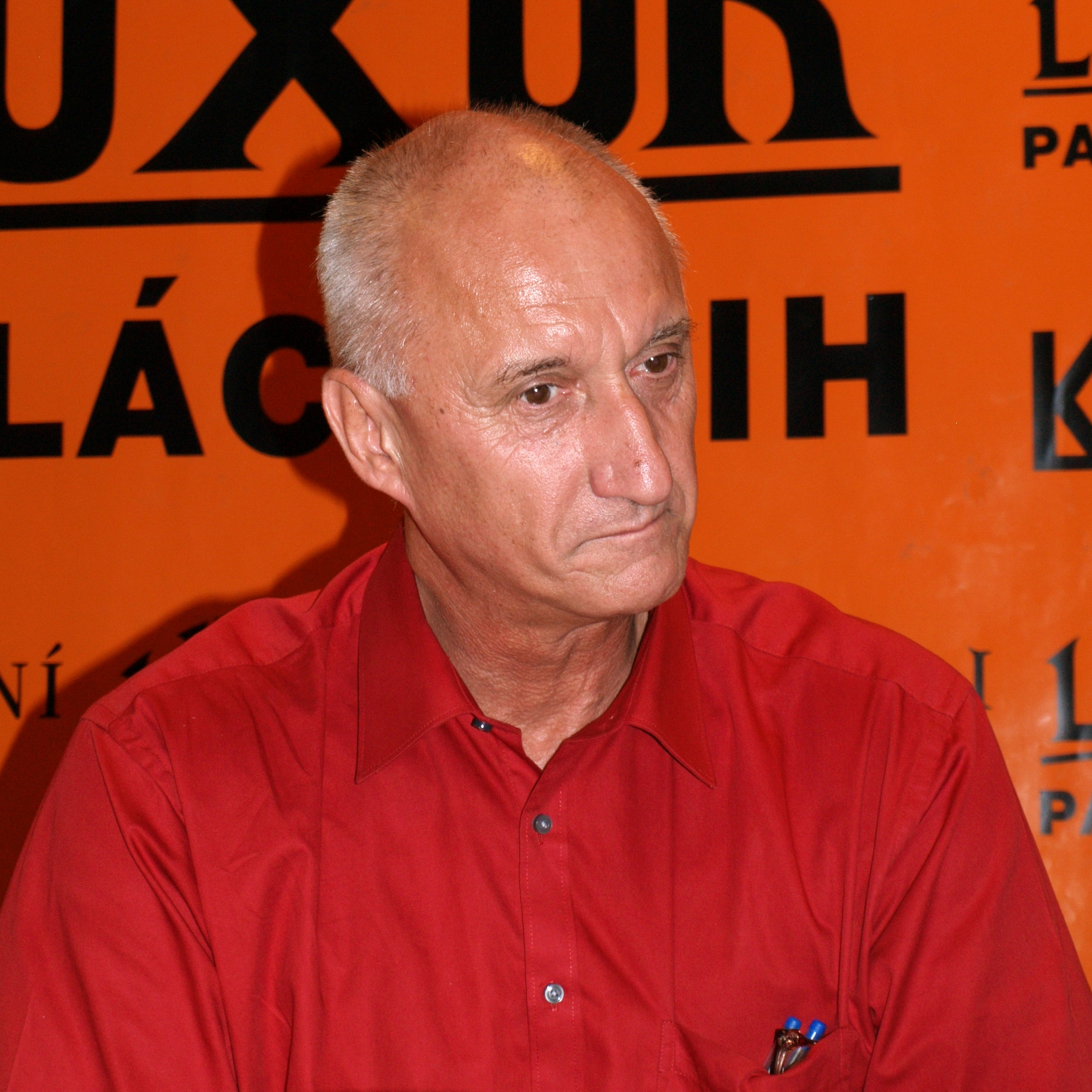
- Born: 27 September 1948 (age 77); Bratislava, Czechoslovakia
- Occupations: Writer, Journalist, Diplomat, Politician

Jozef Banáš (born 27 September 1948) is a Slovak novelist, journalist, diplomat and politician.

== Professional career ==
- 1972 - graduated at the University of Economics in Bratislava with major in foreign trade
- 1973-1976 - business consultant at Chirana Export Piešťany
- 1977-1992 - Ministry of Foreign Affairs, Prague
- 1983-1988 - embassy in Berlin, NDR, press attaché
- 1990-1992 - embassy in Wien, deputy chief of mission
- 1992 - Raiffeisenleasing Wien
- 1993-1994 - Tatraleasing Bratislava, chief executive officer
- 1994-2001 - Slovak International Tabak, industrial politics management

== Works ==
- 1978 – Nebráňme vtákom lietať (Don't stop the birds from flying), TV staging, scenario
- 1979 – Čisté vody (Clear waters), TV staging
- 1982 – Mimoriadny rýchlik (Extraordinary express), TV staging, scenario
- 1983 – Kirchhoffov zákon (Kirchoff's Law), TV staging, scenario
- 1985 – Začiatok sezóny (Start of the season), movie scenario
- 1990 – Tréning na štátnika (Training for statesman), theatre comedy
- 1996 – No Comment, theatre comedy
- 2001 – Lepší ako včera (Better than yesterday), book of short stories
- 2006 – Politicum tremens (co-author Bohumil Hanzel), humorous book about National Council of Slovakia
- 2007 – Idioti v politike (Idiots in politics), satiric book about politics
- 2007 – Delírium P. (Delirium P.), theatre comedy
- 2008 – Zóna nadšenia (Zone of enthusiasm), political thriller
- 2009 – Zastavte Dubčeka! (Stop Dubček !), novel
- 2010 – Deň do večnosti (A day to eternity), poetry collection
- 2010—Kód 9 (Code 9), novel
- 2011 – Sezóna potkanov (Rat season), novel
- 2013 – Kód 1 (Code 1), novel
- 2015 – Dementi (Morons), novel about Banáš's readers
- 2020 - Nádherná Smrť v Altaji ("Amazing Death in Altay mountains"), novel

Besides his literal ventures, he is known as a political journalist and essayist. His essays and thoughts gained international acclaim.

== Political career ==
- 1976 - entered Communist Party of Czechoslovakia (KSČ)
- 2001-2002 - general secretary of the Aliancia nového občana (ANO) party
- 2002-2006 - elected deputy of National Council as ANO candidate. He was the vice-chairman of the Committee on European Integration; member of the Safety and Defence Committee and of the Permanent Delegation of the National Council of Slovakia to the Parliamentary Assembly of the Council of Europe; member of the Foreign Affairs Committee of the National Council and leader of the Permanent Delegation of the National Council at the Parliamentary Assembly of NATO.
- 2003 - vice-chairman of The Parliamentary Assembly of the Council of Europe
- 2004 - after he did not become the lead candidate for ANO in the European Parliament elections, he announced that he was leaving ANO and to become an independent deputy in the National Council
- 2004 - joined the deputies club of The Slovak Democratic and Christian Union party (SDKÚ)
- 2004 - joined SDKÚ
- 11.11.2004 - elected in Venice as a vice-chairman of the NATO Parliamentary Assembly, making him the first Slovak elected to this position

== Personal life ==
He is married and has two daughters. His younger daughter, Adela Vinczeová, is a prominent moderator and entertainer in Slovakia. According to his daughter Adela, Banáš is a lapsed Catholic.
