= Milan Krajniak =

Slovak politician (born 1973)

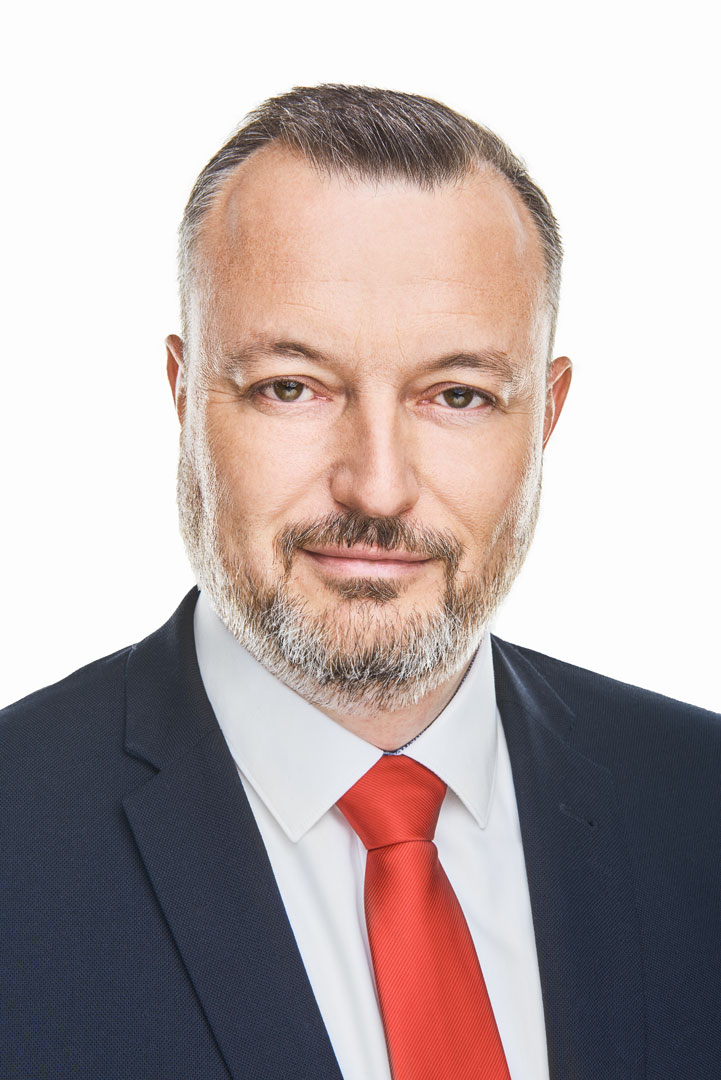

Minister of Labour, Social Affairs and Family
- In office 9 April 2021 – 15 April 2023
- Prime Minister: Eduard Heger
- Preceded by: Andrej Doležal (acting)
- Succeeded by: Soňa Gaborčáková
- In office 21 March 2020 – 17 March 2021
- Prime Minister: Igor Matovič
- Preceded by: Ján Richter
- Succeeded by: Andrej Doležal (acting)

Member of the National Council
- In office 15 May 2023 – 25 October 2023
- In office 18 March 2021 – 8 April 2021
- In office 23 March 2016 – 21 March 2020

Chairman of Christian Union
- Incumbent
- Assumed office 26 October 2024
- Preceded by: Anna Záborská

Personal details
- Born: 30 January 1973 (age 53) Bojnice, Czechoslovakia (now Slovakia)
- Party: Christian Union (2024–present)
- Other political affiliations: We Are Family (2016–2024); NOVA (2012–2016); KDH (until 2012)
- Spouse: Andrea Krajniaková (m. 1998)
- Children: 1
- Education: University of Ss. Cyril and Methodius

Milan Krajniak (born 30 January 1973) is a Slovak politician. He served as Minister of Labour, Social Affairs and Family from 21 March 2020 to 15 April 2023. Krajniak led Christian Union for the 2024 European parliament election.

== Early life ==
Krajniak studied political science at the University of Ss. Cyril and Methodius in Trnava. He was the chairman of the Civic Democratic Youth between 1995 and 1997.

== Political career ==
=== Advisor to the Ministry of Interior ===
Between 2010 and 2012, Krajniak was an advisor to the Minister of the Interior, Daniel Lipšic, but resigned from his position afterwards.

=== We Are Family ===
Since 2016, Krajniak has been a member of the National Council of the Slovak Republic and vice-chairman of the We Are Family. He was also a member of the Defense and Security Committee and the Permanent Delegation of the Slovak Republic to the NATO Parliamentary Assembly.

=== 2019 Slovak presidential election ===
During a press conference on 31 May 2018, together with chairman of We Are Family Boris Kollár, Krajniak announced his president candidacy for the 2019 Slovak presidential election. He collected 15,000 signatures needed for candidacy on 11 August 2018, and got his last signature in Spišská Nová Ves.

=== Minister of Labour, Social Affairs, and Family ===
As Minister of Labour, Social Affairs and Family, Krajniak took up his position a few weeks after the 2020 Slovak parliamentary election during the COVID-19 pandemic. He implemented a parental bonus to the pension system and implemented a parental bonus, which children would contribute to their parents' from taxes

At the press conference on 15 March 2021, Krajniak announced his resignation, citing the reason to resolve the coalition crisis quickly. He addressed this gesture to the coalition partners. Zuzana Čaputová accepted Krajniak's resignation two days later and temporarily entrusted the function to Transport Minister Andrej Doležal. Krajniak returned to parliament as a deputy on 18 March 2021.

== Personal life ==
Krajniak married his wife Andrea on 21 November 1998.
