= Krisztián Forró =

Slovak politician

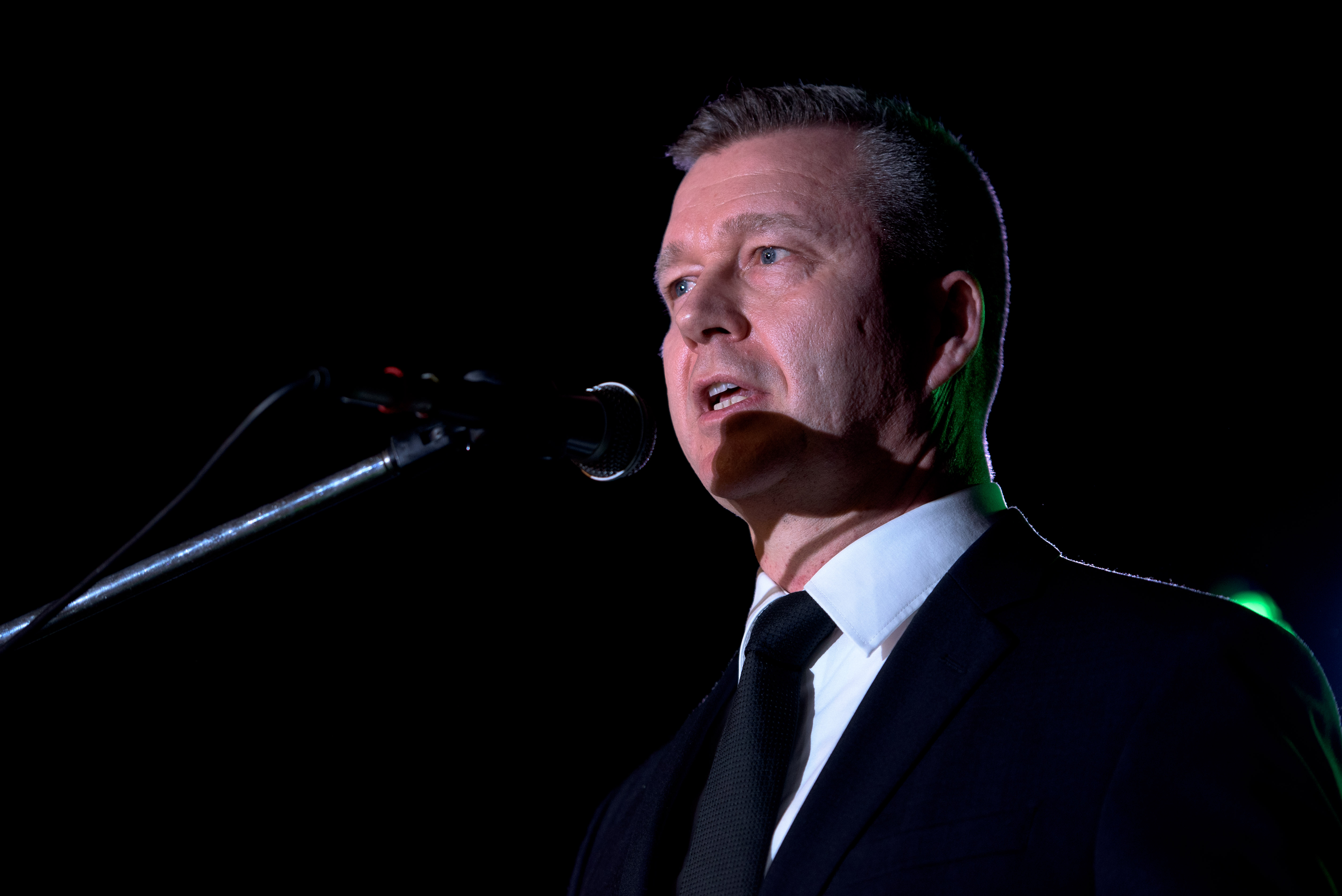
- Forró in 2024

Chairman of the Hungarian Alliance
- In office 7 October 2021 – 28 September 2024
- Preceded by: Moses Szabolcs
- Succeeded by: László Gubík

Chairman of SMK
- In office 11 August 2020 – 27 September 2021
- Preceded by: József Menyhart

Personal details
- Born: 31 January 1976 (age 50) Veľká Mača, Czechoslovakia
- Party: Alliance (2021–present)
- Other political affiliations: SMK (2004–2021)
- Education: Edutus University

Krisztián Forró (born 31 January 1976) is a Slovak businessman and politician. He has served as a representative of the Trnava Region since 2013 and chairman of Hungarian Alliance from 2021 to 2024.

== Biography ==
In 2020, Forró was elected as chairman of SMK.

In the 2024 Slovak presidential election, Forró announced his president candidacy as a member of Hungarian Alliance. He got 65,588 votes, 2.91% of the vote.

Forró speaks Hungarian and Slovak as his native languages, alongside English and German. He is married to Szilvia Fodor with three sons.
