= Christian Union (Slovakia) =

Slovak political party

Conservatives – Christian Union Konzervatívci – Kresťanská únia
- Abbreviation: Konzervatívci
- Leader: Milan Krajniak
- Deputy Leaders: Ľubomír Šteiniger; Richard Vašečka
- Founder: Tomáš Černý
- Founded: 8 February 2019; 7 years ago (Christian Union)
- Registered: 27 August 1998; 28 years ago (Independent Forum)
- Split from: Christian Democratic Movement (Christian Union)
- Headquarters: Partizánska 1248/2, Bratislava-Staré Mesto
- Membership (2023): 65 ▲
- Ideology: Christian right National conservatism Social conservatism
- Political position: Right-wing
- National affiliation: OĽaNO and Friends (since 2023)
- European affiliation: European Christian Political Party
- Colours: Blue; Yellow; Red
- National Council: 2 / 150
- European Parliament: 0 / 15

Website
- smekonzervativci.sk

The Conservatives – Christian Union (Slovak: Konzervatívci – Kresťanská únia, Konzervatívci), previously Independent Forum (Slovak: Nezávislé fórum) from 1998 to 2019 and Christian Union (Slovak: Kresťanská únia) from 2019 to 2026, is a Slovak right-wing conservative political party. The chairwoman of the party since 2024 is Milan Krajniak. At present, it has one deputy of the National Council of the Slovak Republic, Richard Vašečka, elected on the candidate of the coalition OĽaNO and Friends.

== Foundation and history ==
=== Christian Union ===
==== Transformation of NF to KÚ, elections to EP 2019 and NR SR 2020 ====
On 8 February 2019, the party was renamed (registered on 27 August 1998), when on 7 January 2019, the statute and seat of this party changed and on February 8, 2019, it was renamed to the name Christian Union. This transformation of this entity de facto created a new party, but de jure not This step, as the fragmentation of Christian forces and the promotion of Anna Záborská's personal ambitions, was criticized by the chairman of KDH, Alojz Hlina. The founders did so so that they could avoid collecting 10,000 signatures to form a new political party.

In the 2019 European Parliament election, the party won 3.85% of the vote and did not win any seats.

After the elections, the need to unite Christian political forces with KDH or KDŽP was discussed. In the end, the merger did not take place in the autumn of 2019, as President Alojz Hlina offered the Christian Union only 2 seats as a KDH candidate. On the contrary, the KU came closer to the OĽANO movement, on whose candidate list OĽaNO in the parliamentary elections 19 candidates for the KÚ ran, while its chairwoman Anna Záborská ran from 4th place. NOVA and Zmena Zdola did the same with OĽaNO in order to avoid an increased clause for electoral coalitions.

OĽaNO, together with the KÚ, also offered the pre-election procedure to the KDH, to which it offered half the seats on the candidate and, after the elections, its own parliamentary club. KDH rejected this offer.

==== Election period 2020–2024 ====
In the parliamentary elections in February 2020, OĽANO-NOVA-KÚ-ZZ party became the winner of the parliamentary elections, which so far only the Smer-SD and HZDS parties have succeeded in Slovakia. Five members of the Christian Union were elected as deputies.

== Party Politicians ==
=== Party leadership ===
- Milan Krajniak – Chairman

=== Other politicians ===
- Anna Záborská
- Richard Vašečka
- Branislav Škripek
- Ján Szőllős
- Katarína Hatráková
- Radovan Marcinčin

== Election results ==
=== National Council ===
Election	Leader	Votes	%	Rank	Seats	+/–	Status
2020	Igor Matovič (Note: Igor Matovič of OĽaNO served as OĽaNO–KÚ–NOVA–ZZ electoral leader while Anna Záborská served as chairwoman of Christian Union.)	721,166	25.03	1st	5 / 150		OĽaNO–SR–SaS–ZĽ (2020–2022)
2020	Igor Matovič	721,166	25.03	1st	5 / 150		OĽaNO–SR–ZĽ (2022–2023)
2020	As a part of the OĽaNO–KÚ–NOVA–ZZ list, which won 53 seats in total.						
2023	Igor Matovič	264,137	8.9	4th	2 / 150	▼3	Opposition
2023	Running in coalition with the OĽaNO and For the People, which won 16 seats in total.						

=== European Parliament ===
Election	List leader	Votes	%	Rank	Seats	+/–	EP Group
2019	Unclear	37,974	3.85	9th	0 / 14	New	–
2024	Milan Krajniak	9,313	0.63	12th	0 / 15	0	–
