= Róbert Švec =

Slovak politician

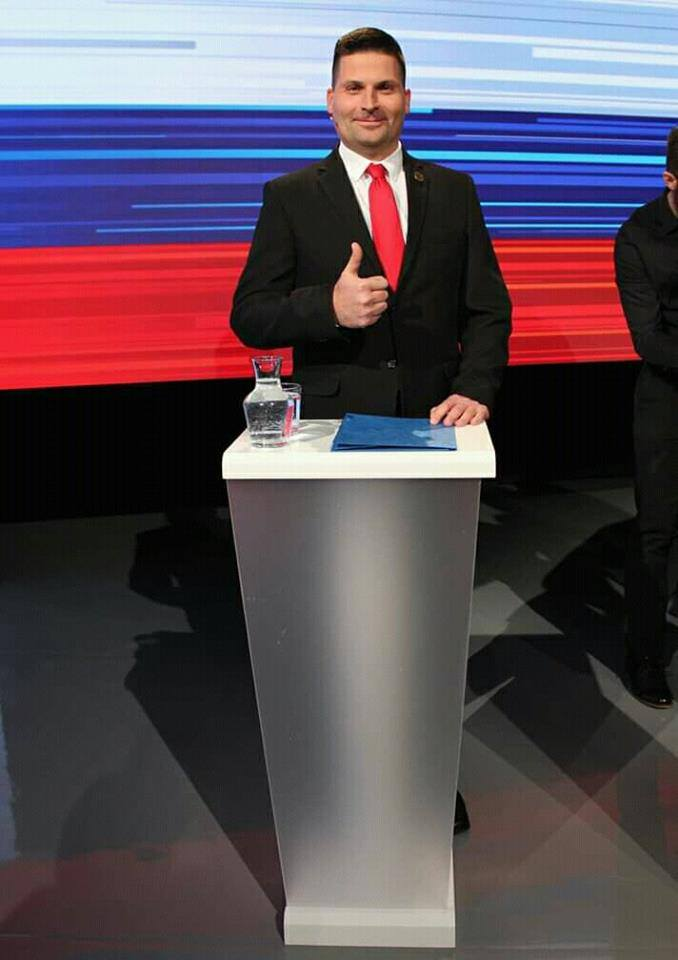
- Švec in the RTVS station (2019)

Chair of Slovak Revival Movement
- Incumbent
- Assumed office 15 May 2019

Personal details
- Born: 21 August 1976 (age 50) Nitra, Czechoslovakia
- Party: Slovak Revival Movement (from 2019)
- Education: University of Trnava

Róbert Švec (born 21 August 1976) is a Slovak politician who has served as chairman of the Slovak Revival Movement since 2019.

== Early and personal life ==
Born 21 August 1976 in Nitra, Švec studied political science at the University of Trnava.

== Political career ==
In the 2019 Slovak presidential election, Švec ran as an independent candidate for the President of Slovakia. On 28 January 2019, he submitted more than 18,000 signatures confirming his candidacy for the presidency. During the first round in March 2019, Švec received 6,567 votes and did not advance to the second round.

After the 2019 presidential election, Švec founded his political party, the Slovak Revival Movement (SHO), and became its chairman. He ran as the leader of SHO candidates in the 2020 Slovak parliamentary election, but the party did not win any seat.

Švec was about to ran his candidacy once again in the 2024 Slovak presidential election, this time as a member of the Slovak Revival Movement. However, he was ruled ineligible due to an insufficient number of valid signatures.

== Controversy ==
=== Promotion of fascist historical figures ===
Švec and the Slovak Revival Movement have repeatedly glorified the president of World War II era Slovak Republic and convinced war criminal Jozef Tiso.

=== Anti–democratic rhetorics ===
In an interview with JOJ, Švec declared that Slovakia should withdraw from the European Union and NATO and band the Intersex and LGBT symbols. He further declared that Slovakia should curb media freedom "so that our youth does not grow up under the influence of decadent culture and tabloids."

=== Signature forgery ===
Švec was prevented from running in the 2024 Slovak presidential election because the election committee found about 10,000 out of 15,000 total signatures of Slovak citizens supporting his candidacy likely forged. The following years, activists led by Švec delivered 400,000 signatures to the president of Slovakia Peter Pellegrini demanding a referendum to discontinue sanctions against Russia implemented after the Russian invasion of Ukraine. The president refused to do so, citing suspicions that of some of the signatures being created by the Generative AI.
