= We Are Family (Slovakia) =

Right-wing populist political movement in Slovakia

We Are Family Sme rodina
- Abbreviation: Sme Rodina
- Leader: Boris Kollár
- Deputy Leaders: Petra Krištúfková; Marián Labanič; Jozef Lukáč; Jozef Vašuta
- Founder: Boris Kollár
- Founded: 6 July 2011
- Headquarters: Leškova 5, 811 04 Bratislava
- Youth wing: The Young Help
- Membership (2021): ▲1,309
- Ideology: National conservatism; Right-wing populism
- Political position: Right-wing to far-right
- National affiliation: Sme rodina a Sulíkovci
- European affiliation: Identity and Democracy Party (2019–2023)
- Colours: Blue and red
- Slogan: "We are normal" (2023)
- National Council: 0 / 150
- European Parliament: 0 / 15
- Regional governors: 0 / 8
- Regional deputies (Note: Also with coalitions): 55 / 419
- Mayors: 135 / 2,904
- Local councillors: 539 / 20,462

Website
- hnutie-smerodina.sk

We Are Family (Slovak: Sme rodina) is a national-conservative and right-wing populist political party in Slovakia founded in 2011. It is led by businessman Boris Kollár who was Speaker of the National Council from 2020 to 2023.

It won seats in the National Council in the 2016 and 2020 parliamentary elections, serving in the opposition from 2016 to 2020 and as the junior government party from 2020 to 2023. It did not win any seats in the 2019 European Parliament election. It was a member of the Eurosceptic Identity and Democracy, which is an alliance of political parties in Europe.

== History ==
Former party logo

The party was originally registered on 6 July 2011 as Party of Citizens of Slovakia (Strana občanov Slovenska). In November 2015 the party was taken over by Boris Kollár, who renamed it "We Are Family – Boris Kollár" (Sme Rodina – Boris Kollár). The party received 7% of the vote in the 2016 parliamentary election, winning 11 seats in the National Council. The party joined the pan-European Identity and Democracy Party in February 2019 and dropped Boris Kollár from its name in November of the same year.

In the 2023 parliamentary elections, We Are Family received 2% of the vote and lost all of its seats in the National Council.

== Election results ==
=== National Council ===
Election	Leader	Votes	%	Rank	Seats	+/–	Status
2016	Boris Kollár	172,860	6.62	6th	11 / 150	New	Opposition
2020	Boris Kollár	237,531	8.24	3rd	17 / 150	▲6	Coalition government
2023	Boris Kollár	65,673	2.21	11th	0 / 150	▼17	No seats

=== European Parliament ===
Election	Leader	Votes	%	Rank	Seats	+/–	Group
2019	Peter Pčolinský	31,840	3.23	10th	0 / 14		

=== President ===
Election	Candidate	First round			Second round		
Election	Candidate	Votes	%	Rank	Votes	%	Rank
2019	Milan Krajniak	59,464	2.77	7th			
