= Boris Kollár =

Slovak businessman and politician (born 1965)

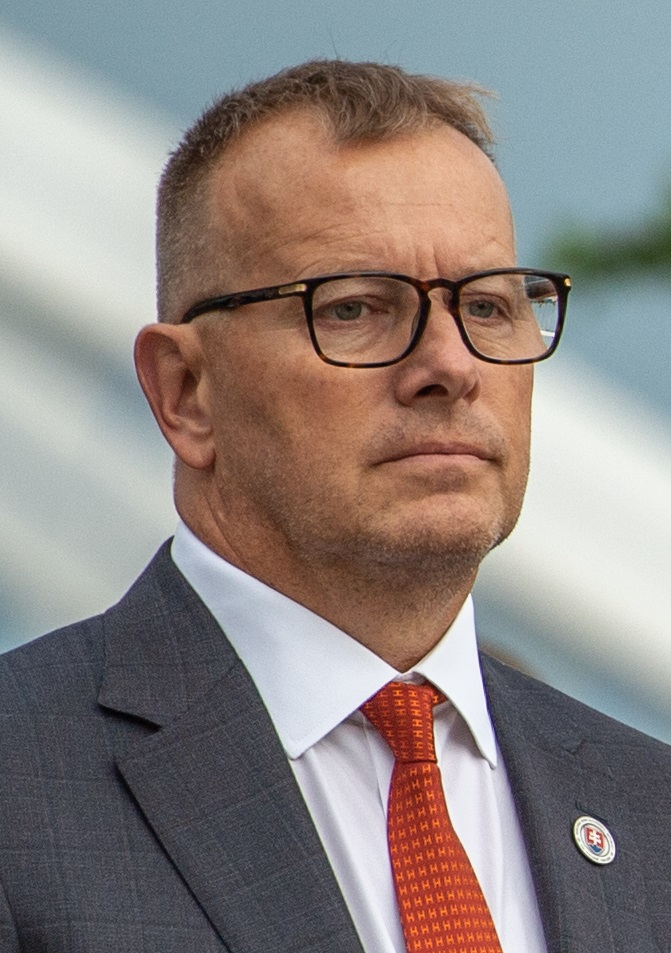
- Kollár in 2022

Speaker of the National Council
- In office 20 March 2020 – 25 October 2023
- President: Zuzana Čaputová
- Preceded by: Andrej Danko
- Succeeded by: Peter Pellegrini

Member of the National Council
- In office 23 March 2016 – 25 October 2023

Personal details
- Born: 14 August 1965 (age 61) Bratislava, Czechoslovakia
- Party: We Are Family (since 2015)
- Children: 19
- Education: University of Central Europe

Boris Kollár (born 14 August 1965) is a Slovak businessman and politician. He served as a Member of the National Council from 2016 to 2023 and a Speaker of the National Council from 2020 to 2023. He has 17 children.

== Biography ==
=== Early life and education ===
Boris Kollár was born on 14 August 1965 in Bratislava. As a child, he was raised by a single mother after his father abandoned the family when Boris was just two years old. The family was poor and Kollár had to share a room with his grandmother, while his mother shared the only other room of their small apartment with his half brother Ľudovít Goga.

Following education at the grammar school in Bratislava, Kollár supported his family with a variety of odd jobs - working as a cashier at a theatre, ice-cream seller and operating a fastfood truck. After the Velvet Revolution, he earned a small fortune by importing computers from abroad and selling them to local companies and public institutions. He also earned money by trading foreign currencies, although he rejects the widespread allegation of having worked as a fartsovka.

In spite of being a member of the supervisory board of the Academy of Fine Arts and Design from 2010 to 2014, Boris Kollár had no collage degree until 2015, when he graduated from the University of Central Europe at the age of 49.

=== Business career ===
In 1990, Boris Kollár used the money earned through computer import to start a business in operating the skiing resort at Donovaly. In addition, he has been the owner of the radio station Fun Rádio since 1999, where he co-hosted the erotic talk show K-fun from 2004 to 2005. Since 2019, he also owns another radio station Rádio Vlna.

=== Political career ===
In 2015, Boris Kollár launched the political party We Are Family (Slovak: Sme Rodina) by renaming and repurposing an existing minor party named Our Land (Náš Kraj). His party won 11 seats in the National Council during the 2016 Slovak parliamentary election.

According to the New York Times, Kollár is a representative of generation of Central and Eastern European businessmen turning populist politicians in similar fashion to the US president Donald Trump.

In 2019, Kollár welcomed Marine Le Pen in Bratislava to announce the common intention to create a fraction in the European Parliament following the 2019 European Parliament election. This alliance, however, ended in a failure because We Are Family failed to win any MEP seats.

The party fared even better in the 2020 Slovak parliamentary election, winning 17 seats and becoming the third strongest party in parliament. The party joined the government coalition with Ordinary People and Independent Personalities, Freedom and Solidarity and For the People parties, resulting in Kollár becoming the speaker of the National Council.

In 2023 Slovak parliamentary election, We Are Family failed to reach the representation threshold in the midst of a domestic violence scandal Boris Kollár and one of his former romantic partners were involved. In response to the electoral defeat, Kollár announced he would reconsider his further involvement in politics.

== Controversy ==
=== Allegations of mafia connections ===
In 2016, a source turned over to SME material linking Boris Kollár to the Slovak mafia. Kollar rejected the accusation as an attempt to discredit him. New allegations of mafia connections emerged in 2023.

=== Domestic abuse ===
In June 2023, Kollár's former romantic partner and mother of two of his children Barbara Richterová sent a letter to all members of the National Council accusing Kollár of severely beating her at his home in Florida. In reaction, Kollár admitted to slapping Richterová, claiming it was response to her actions endangering their child. In response to Kollár's admission a group of MPs unsuccessfully attempted to remove him from the position of the speaker.

Former mobster Tomáš Rajecký, who had vacationed in the past with Kollár testified that Kollár also abused his former partners Petra Krištúfková and Monika Péter both of whom served as deputies for his We Are Family parties. Both denied being victims of domestic violence by Kollár.

=== Homophobia ===
Kollár frequently posts homophobic content on social media. He was nominated for the "Homophobe of the year" nomination by the Institute of Human rights in 2015 and 2017. He was also nominated in 2020, but the nomination was withdrawn after Kollár's messages to a transgender model Paris Nemec were made public. In the messages, Kollár expressed desire to engage in a homosexual intercourse with the model, which was interpreted by the Institute as an expression of a positive attitude towards a member of the LGBTI community.

=== Plagiarism ===
In June 2020, the Aktuality.sk website revealed that Kollár's final thesis contains entire pages of plagiarized text. Further investigations found over half of Kollár's thesis was plagiarized. In reaction to the findings, Kollár apologized but argued that "every student is trying to make studying easier".

University rectors as well as politicians, including Kollár's coalition partners Ján Mičovský and Ondrej Dostál, called for his resignation in connection to the plagiarism scandal.

In March 2021 the police decided not to start a criminal prosecution over Kollár's thesis.

=== Promotion of Fake News ===
Boris Kollár used his social media channels to spread Fake News related to 2015 European migrant crisis and particularly the actions of Angela Merkel. He also spread hoaxes about a Ukrainian refugee attacking Slovak police.

Kollár promoted the hoaxes about the European Union regulating the shape of bananas and cucumbers. He also promoted fake news that EU banned phone chargers.

The We Are Family party advertised on the internet website Hlavné Správy, which is, according to the political scientist Tomáš Kriššák, associated with spreading hoaxes and fake news. The content paid by the party was not marked as paid advertisement.

=== The Clear Day affair ===
In 2017, the director of the Clear Day facility for youth battling drug addiction accused an unnamed politician of writing "lewd messages" to an underaged girl living at the facility. In response to the allegation, Boris Kollár admitted to communication with the girl and published the messages that according to him show that he was unaware the girl was underage.

== Personal life ==
In addition to a villa in Bratislava, Boris Kollár owns property in Thailand and Spain. In the past, he owned two luxury villas in Florida.

He has fathered 17 children with 14 different women.

In 2006, Kollár was in a relationship with the Czech actress Kateřina Brožová. Following their breakup, he was briefly in relationship with the actress Karin Haydu. He was also romantically involved with We Are Family MPs Petra Krištúfková and Monika Péter.

Kollár's large family was a subject of BBC coverage.

Political offices
Preceded by Andrej Danko	Speaker of the National Council; 2020–2023	Succeeded by Peter Pellegrini
