= 2024 European Parliament election in Slovakia =

- 8 June 2024

All 15 Slovak seats in the European Parliament
- Turnout: 34.39% (▲11.65 pp)
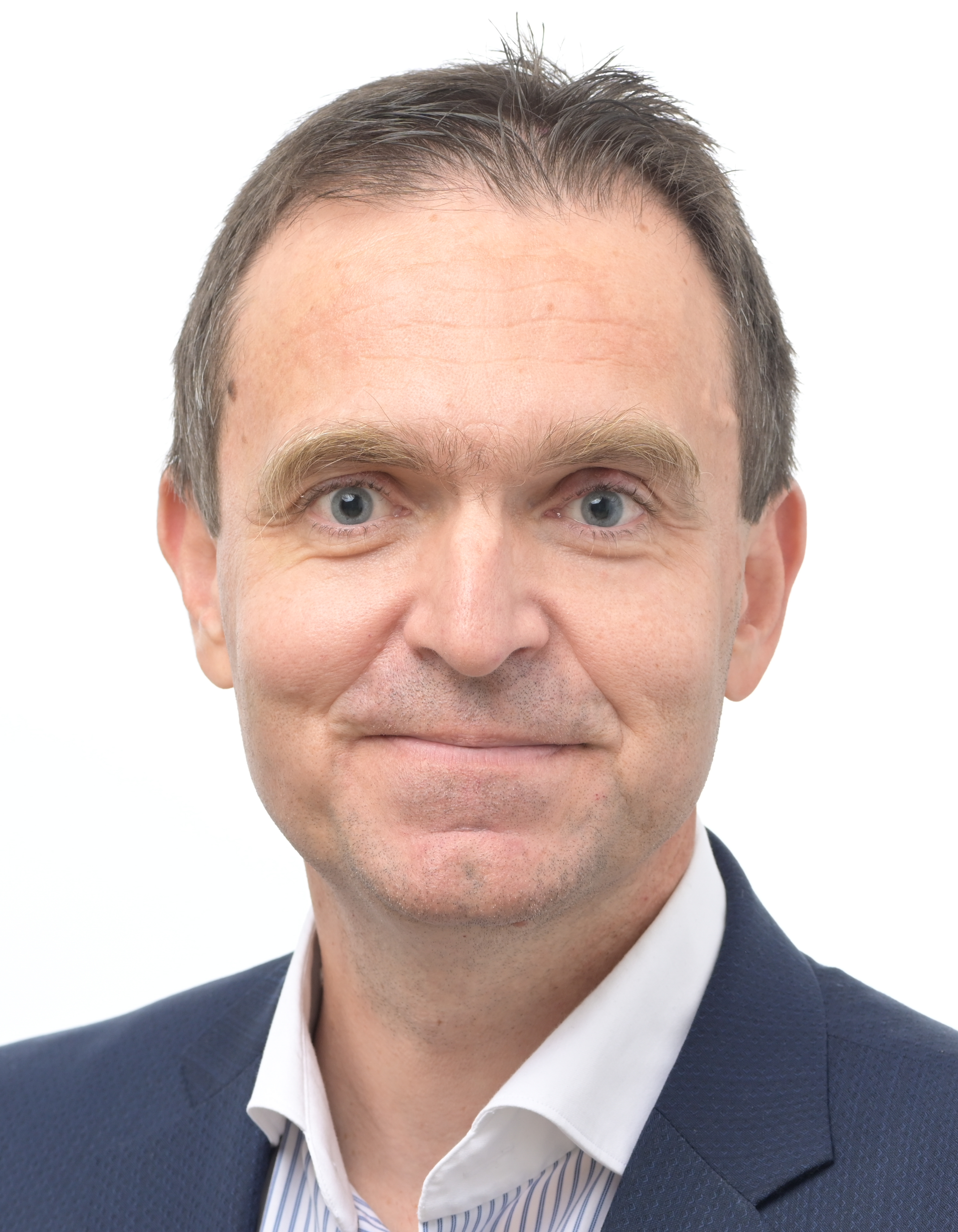

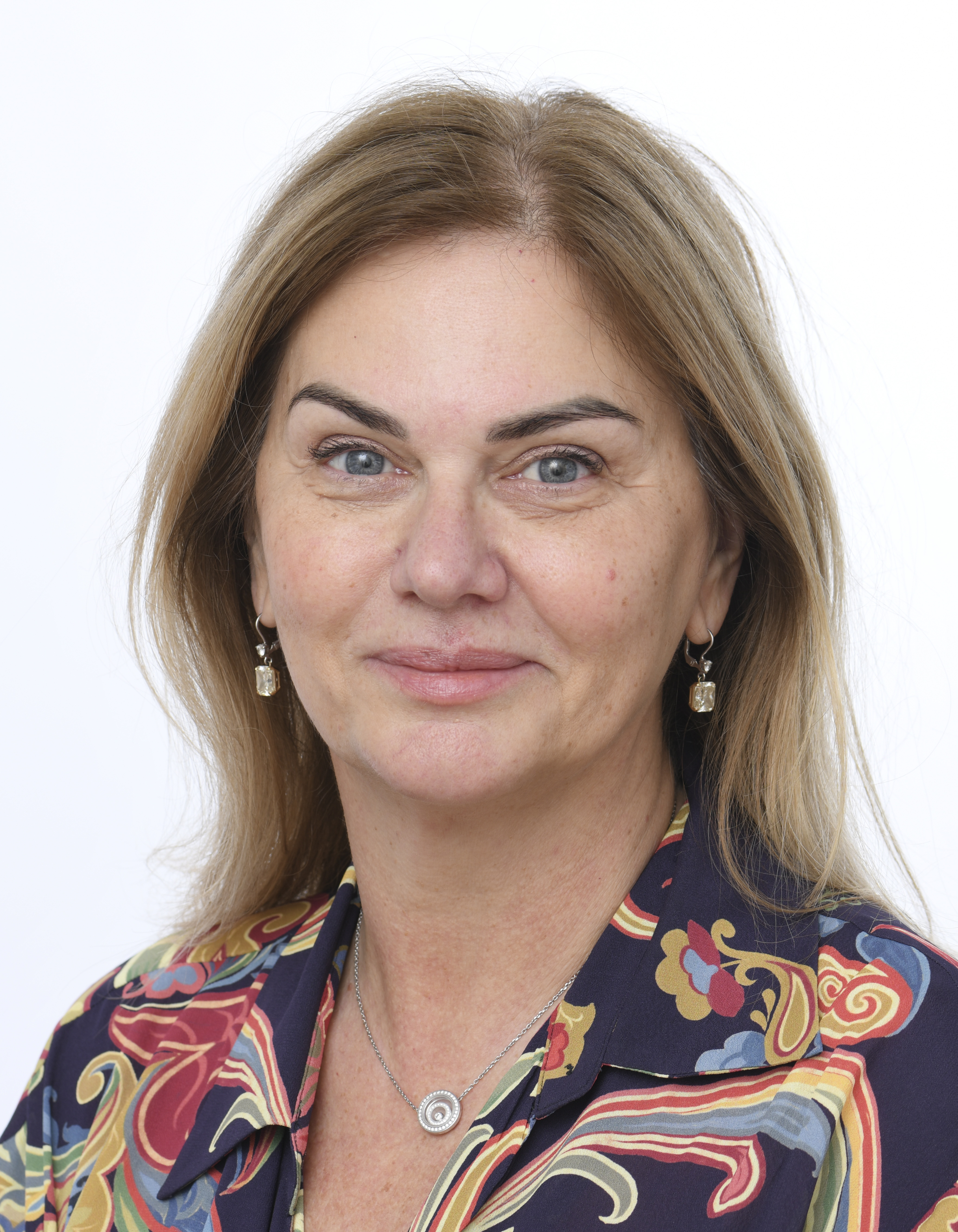

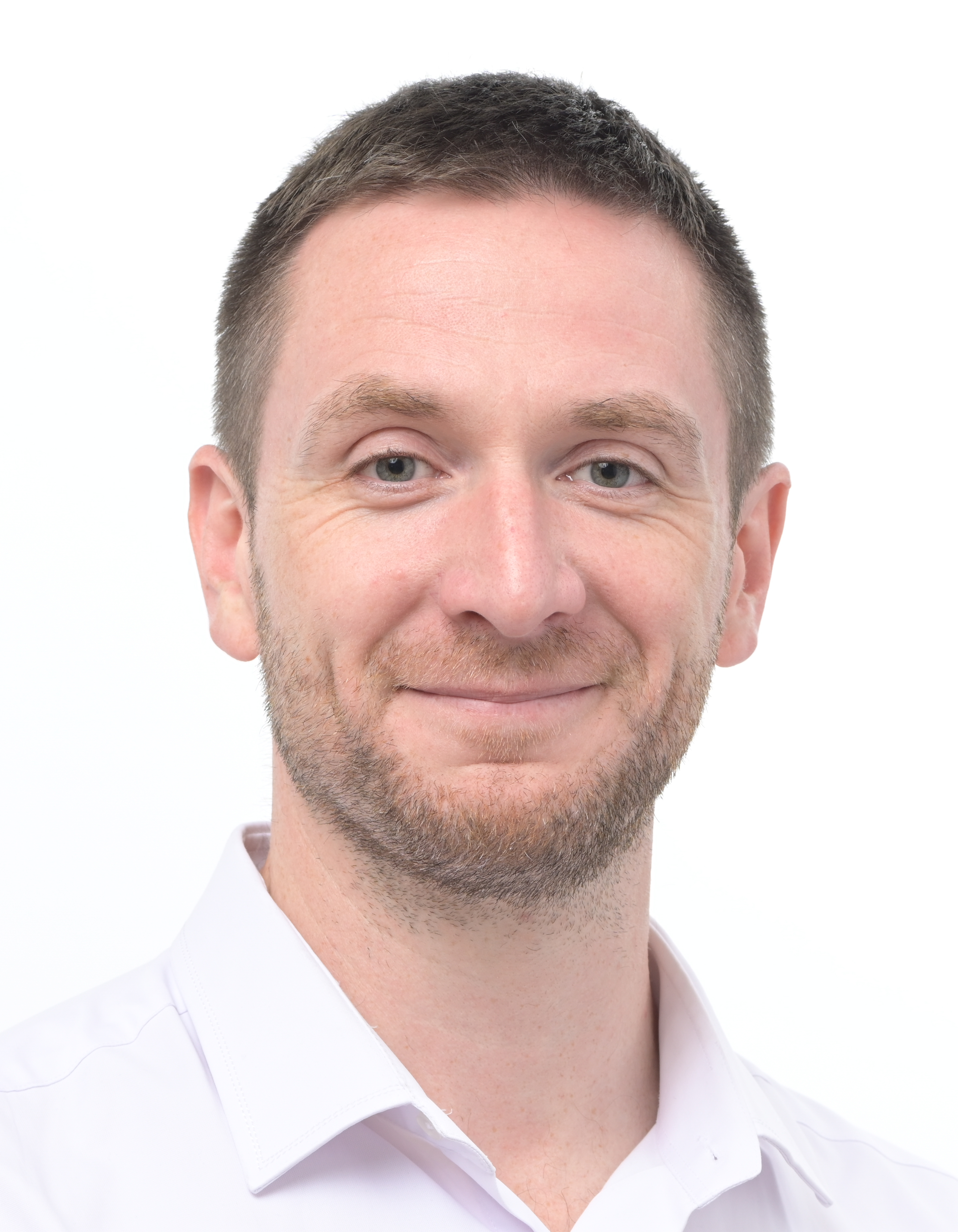

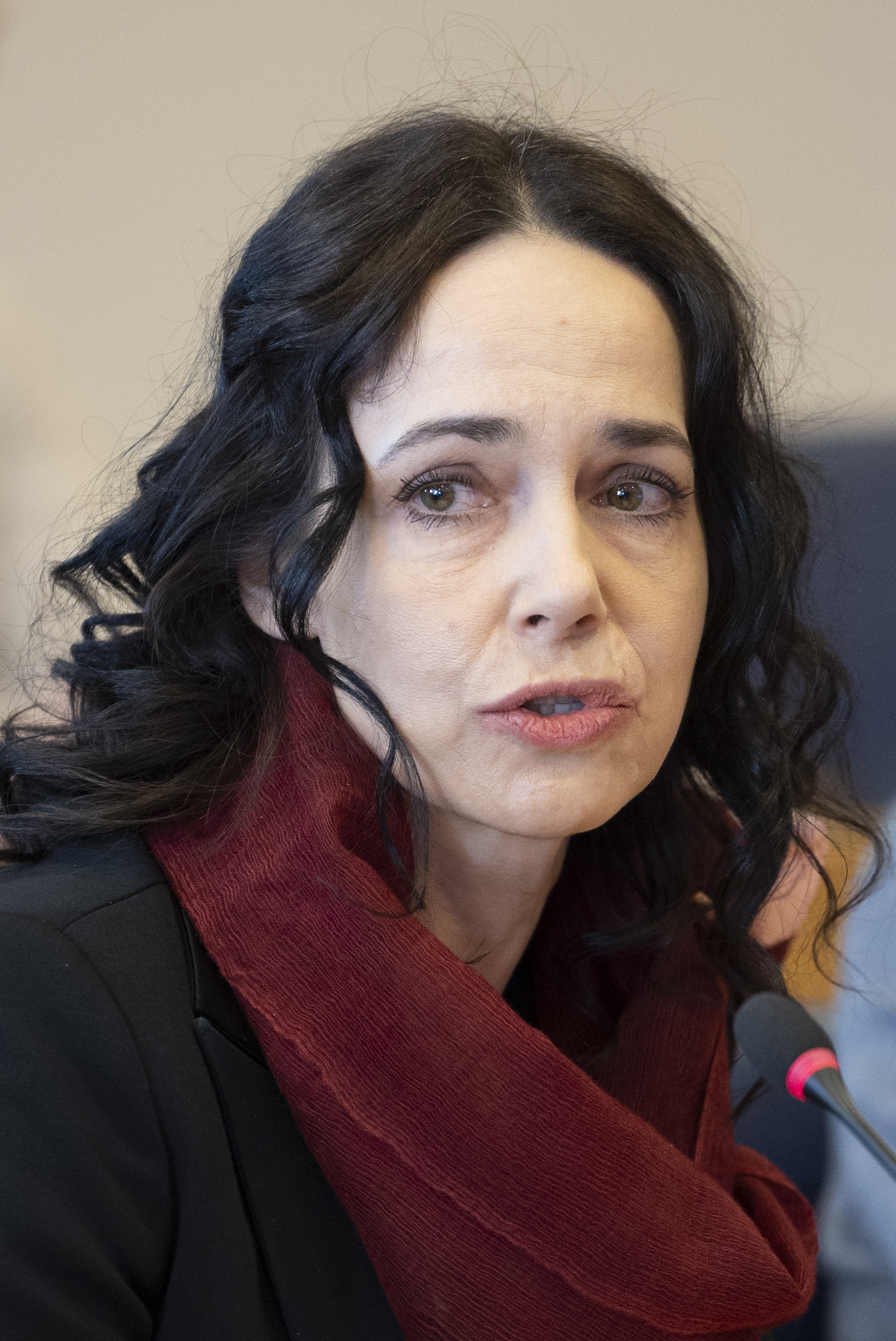
	First party	Second party	Third party
Leader	Ľudovít Ódor	Monika Beňová	Milan Uhrík
Party	PS	Smer	Republic
Alliance	ALDE	NI	NI
Last election	2 seats, 20.11% (Note: Percentage for joint 2019 PS–SPOLU list. Seats for PS only.)	3 seats, 15.72%	New (Note: Milan Uhrík was elected as a MEP for ĽSNS but left the party in 2021)
Seats won	6	5	2
Seat change	▲4	▲2	New
Popular vote	410,844	365,794	185,137
Percentage	27.82%	24.77%	12.53%
	Fourth party	Fifth party
Leader	Branislav Becík	Miriam Lexmann
Party	Hlas	KDH
Alliance	NI	EPP
Last election	New	2 seats
Seats won	1	1
Seat change	New	▼1
Popular vote	106,076	105,602
Percentage	7.18%	7.15%
- Results of the election, showing vote strength by district

The 2024 European Parliament election in Slovakia was held on 8 June 2024 as part of the 2024 European Parliament election. This was the fifth European Parliament election held in Slovakia, and the first to take place after Brexit.

== Background ==
The Slovak government and the European Union have clashed over domestic legal reforms.

== Electoral system ==
Compared to last election, Slovakia is entitled to two more MEP: one already assigned in 2020 in the occasion of the redistribution post Brexit, and one assigned in 2023 after a pre-election assessment of the Parliament composition based on the most recent population figures. The 15 members are elected through semi-open list proportional representation in a single nationwide constituency with seats allocated through largest remainder method and a 5% electoral threshold.

Both Slovak citizens and other non-Slovak EU citizens residing in the country are entitled to vote in the European elections in Slovakia. No registration is needed for Slovak citizens, while other EU citizens residing in Slovakia are required to register in their municipality no later than 40 days before the election day. Slovak citizens residing abroad cannot vote from abroad but can vote if present on the day of the election in Slovakia with a Slovak passport. In addition, those eligible to vote must turn 18 years old by election day at the latest.

== Outgoing delegation ==
The table shows the detailed composition of the Slovak seats at the European Parliament as of 16 February 2024.

EP Group	Seats	Party	Seats	MEPs
European People's Party	4 / 14	Christian Democratic Movement	2	Miriam Lexmann; Ivan Štefanec
European People's Party	4 / 14	Slovakia	1	Peter Pollák
European People's Party	4 / 14	Democrats	1	Vladimír Bilčík
Renew Europe	4 / 14	Progressive Slovakia	2	Martin Hojsík; Michal Wiezik
Renew Europe	4 / 14	Jablko	1	Lucia Ďuriš Nicholsonová
Renew Europe	4 / 14	Independents	1	Jozef Mihál
Progressive Alliance of Socialists and Democrats	1 / 14	Independents	1	Róbert Hajšel
European Conservatives and Reformists	1 / 14	Freedom and Solidarity	1	Eugen Jurzyca
Non-Inscrits	4 / 14	Direction – Social Democracy	2	Monika Beňová; Katarína Roth Neveďalová
Non-Inscrits	4 / 14	Slovak PATRIOT	1	Miroslav Radačovský
Non-Inscrits	4 / 14	Republic	1	Milan Uhrík
Total			14	
Source: European Parliament

=== Retiring incumbents ===
Name	Party	First elected	Terms	Date announced	Source
Róbert Hajšel	Direction – Social Democracy	2019	1	9 February 2024	
Vladimír Bilčík	SPOLU	2019	1	19 April 2024	

== Running parties ==
Party		European Party	Group	2019 result	Top candidate
PS	Progressive Slovakia	ALDE	RE	20.1	Ľudovít Ódor
Demokrati	Democrats	EPP	EPP	20.1	Jaroslav Naď
Smer–SD	Direction – Social Democracy	PES (suspended)	NI	15.7	Monika Beňová
ĽSNS	Kotlebists − People's Party Our Slovakia	APF	−	12.1	Marian Kotleba
KDH	Christian Democratic Movement	EPP	EPP	9.7	Miriam Lexmann
SaS	Freedom and Solidarity	ECR	ECR	9.6	Richard Sulík
SK−ZĽ−NOVA	Slovakia − For the People − NOVA	EPP	EPP	5.3	Peter Pollák
MSZ	Hungarian Alliance	EPP	−	5.0	József Berényi
SNS	Slovak National Party: Life – National Party; National Coalition / Independent Candidates	ID	−	4.1	Andrej Danko
KÚ	Christian Union	ECPM	−	3.9	Milan Krajniak
KSS	Communist Party of Slovakia	PEL	−	0.6	Ján Chalabala
SOS	Common Citizens of Slovakia	−	−	0.6	Andrej Krajiček
SĽS	Slovak People's Party Andrej Hlinka	−	−	0.3	Jozef Sásik
Hlas–SD	Voice – Social Democracy	PES (suspended)	−	−	Branislav Becík
REPUBLIKA	Republic: Alternative for Slovakia; HOME National Party	−	NI	−	Milan Uhrík
PATRIOT	Slovak PATRIOT	−	NI	−	Miroslav Radačovský
Volt	Volt Slovakia	Volt	−	−	Lucia Kleštincová
SDKÚ-DS	Slovak Democratic and Christian Union – Democratic Party	−	−	−	Branislav Rybárik
SPS	Slovak Pirate Party	PPEU	−	−	Zuzana Šubová
S.sk	Socialisti.sk	−	−	−	Artur Bekmatov
ZR	Common Sense	−	−	−	Ján Baránek
MySlovensko	MySlovensko	−	−	−	Štefan Panenka
SOSK	We Unite the Citizens of Slovakia	−	−	−	Libuša Nicholson
SRDCE–SNJ	SRDCE Patriots and Pensioners – Slovak National Unity	−	−	−	Jozef Tokár

== Opinion polls ==
Polling firm	Date	Sample size	PS Renew	Democrats EPP	Smer NI	ĽSNS NI	Život NI	SNS ID	KDH EPP	SaS ECR	KÚ ECR	OĽaNO EPP	ZĽ EPP	MA EPP	SR ID	Hlas NI	Republika NI	Others	Lead
Ipsos	30 May–4 Jun 2024	1,225	21.9; 4	5.2; 1	24.6; 4	1.0; 0	3.2; 0		6.3; 1	5.7; 1	1.5; 0	4.4; 0		5.1; 1	—N/a	11.2; 2	8.7; 1	1.2 (Note: Common Sense 0.7%)	2.7
NMS	30 May–3 Jun 2024	1,020	23.2; 5	3.3; 0	22.1; 4	0.7; 0	3.1; 0		5.0; 1	6.4; 1	1.2; 0	3.2; 0		3.7; 0	—N/a	11.9; 2	11.0; 2	5.1	1.1
Median	21–27 May 2024	640	20.6	4.9	22.5	1.4	2.3		7.2	7.0	—N/a	6.6		3.3	—N/a	14.0	9.4	0.8	1.9
Ipsos	14–21 May 2024	414	23.5; 4	3.4; 0	24.4; 4	1.7; 0	4.0; 0		7.1; 1	5.7; 1	—N/a	5.3; 1		4.8; 0	—N/a	10.3; 2	9.0; 2	0.8	0.9
NMS	9–13 May 2024	1,020	23.4; 5	3.5; 0	17.3; 4	0.9; 0	3.0; 0		4.8; 0	7.4; 1	1.6; 0	4.8; 0		3.1; 0	—N/a	11.2; 2	12.6; 3	6.3 (Note: Common Sense 2.2, MySlovensko 0.8, KSS 0.7, SOS 0.5, Slovak PATRIOT 0.4, SDKÚ-DS 0.4, Socialisti.sk 0.3, SOSK 0.3, Volt 0.3, SRDCE 0.2, Piráti 0.2, SĽS 0.0)	6.1
AKO	7–14 May 2024	1,000	25.6; 4	3.4; 0	17.6; 3	1.0; 0	5.2; 1		7.0; 1	6.7; 1	0.6; 0	2.7; 0		3.7; 0	—N/a	14.4; 3	8.5; 2	3.6	8.0
NMS	18–24 April 2024	1,010	24.3; 5	4.4; 0	19.8; 4	0.7; 0	3.2; 0		4.6; 0	7.0; 1	0.8; 0	3.6; 0		2.9; 0	—N/a	12.0; 3	10.7; 2	5.8 (Note: Common Sense 2.2, MySlovensko 0.6, Piráti 0.6, Slovak PATRIOT 0.6, SOS 0.5, SDKÚ-DS 0.4, Socialisti.sk 0.3, SOSK 0.2, SRDCE 0.2, Volt 0.1, KSS 0.1, SĽS 0.0%)	4.5
AKO	9–16 April 2024	1,000	27.2; 5	2.7; 0	15.2; 3	1.0; 0	4.1; 0		6.7; 1	6.5; 1	0.8; 0	3.2; 0		5.0; 1	—N/a	14.2; 3	7.5; 1	5.9 (Note: Common Sense 1.5, SRDCE 1.2, SOSK 0.7, KSS 0.7, SDKÚ-DS 0.5, Piráti 0.5, MySlovensko 0.5, SĽS 0.3, SOS 0.1, Volt 0.1, Slovak PATRIOT 0.0, Socialisti.sk 0.0)	12.0
Ipsos	23 Feb – 5 Mar 2024	1,502	24.6; 5	2.3; 0	26.7; 5	2.1; 0	4.8; 0		8.2; 2	4.6; 0	4.9; 0			2.4; 0	—N/a	11.8; 2	6.4; 1	1.2	2.1
2023 elections	30 Sep 2023	2,967,896	17.96	2.21	22.95	0.84	5.63		6.82	6.32	8.90			4.39	2.93	14.70	4.75	1.60	4.99
2020 elections	29 Feb 2020	2,881,511	6.97		18.29	7.97		3.16	4.65	6.22	25.03		5.77	3.91	8.24	—N/a	—N/a	9.34	6.74
2019 elections	25 May 2019	985,680	20.11; 4		15.72; 3	12.07; 2	2.07; 0	4.09; 0	9.70; 2	9.62; 2	3.85; 0	5.26; 1	—N/a	4.96; 0	3.23; 0	—N/a	—N/a	9.32	4.29

== Results ==
Results of the election, showing vote strength by municipality.

Party	Votes	%	Seats	+/–
Progressive Slovakia	410,844	27.82	6	+4
Direction – Social Democracy	365,794	24.77	5	+2
Republic	185,137	12.53	2	New
Voice – Social Democracy	106,076	7.18	1	New
Christian Democratic Movement	105,602	7.15	1	–1
Freedom and Solidarity	72,703	4.92	0	–2
Democrats	69,204	4.69	0	–2
Hungarian Alliance	57,350	3.88	0	0
Slovakia − For the People	29,385	1.99	0	–1
Slovak National Party	28,102	1.90	0	0
Common Sense	13,867	0.94	0	New
Christian Union	9,313	0.63	0	0
Kotlebists – People's Party Our Slovakia	7,103	0.48	0	–2
Slovak PATRIOT	5,412	0.37	0	New
Communist Party of Slovakia	2,232	0.15	0	0
Volt Slovakia	1,923	0.13	0	New
Socialisti.sk	1,800	0.12	0	New
HEART Patriots and Pensioners	1,274	0.09	0	New
MySlovensko	1,214	0.08	0	New
We Unite the Citizens of Slovakia	1,143	0.08	0	New
Common Citizens of Slovakia	588	0.04	0	New
Slovak People's Party of Andrej Hlinka	486	0.03	0	0
Slovak Democratic and Christian Union	416	0.03	0	–
Total	1,476,968	100.00	15	+1
Valid votes	1,476,968	98.13		
Invalid/blank votes	28,208	1.87		
Total votes	1,505,176	100.00		
Registered voters/turnout	4,377,093	34.39		
Source: Statistical Office of the Slovak Republic

Popular vote
PS	27.82%
Smer-SD	24.77%
Republika	12.53%
Hlas-SD	7.18%
KDH	7.15%
SaS	4.92%
Demokrati	4.69%
MH	3.88%

=== European groups ===
Party	Seats	+/–
Renew Europe	6	+4
Non-Inscrits	6	+6
Europe of Sovereign Nations Group	2	New
European People's Party Group	1	-4
Total	15	+1

=== Results by region ===
Region	PS	Smer	Republic	Hlas	KDH	SaS	Democrats	Hungarian Alliance	Other parties
Bratislava Region	44.87	18.21	8.33	3.76	5.44	8.09	5.78	0.72	8.44
Trnava Region	27.80	23.17	11.99	5.10	5.48	4.29	4.71	11.23	6.09
Trenčín Region	24.81	30.85	14.95	7.77	5.83	4.40	4.32	0.02	6.94
Nitra Region	23.44	26.01	12.50	8.67	4.41	3.63	3.91	11.71	5.60
Žilina Region	24.81	26.57	14.88	7.51	9.06	4.57	4.73	0.03	7.72
Banská Bystrica Region	24.54	26.69	13.58	9.26	5.08	4.06	3.99	5.16	7.52
Košice Region	25.46	23.99	12.06	7.67	7.19	4.88	4.93	5.48	8.23
Prešov Region	19.74	25.22	13.46	8.97	14.23	3.94	4.52	0.05	9.79
Total	27.82	24.77	12.53	7.18	7.15	4.92	4.69	3.80	7.06
