= Ábel Ravasz =

Slovak politician

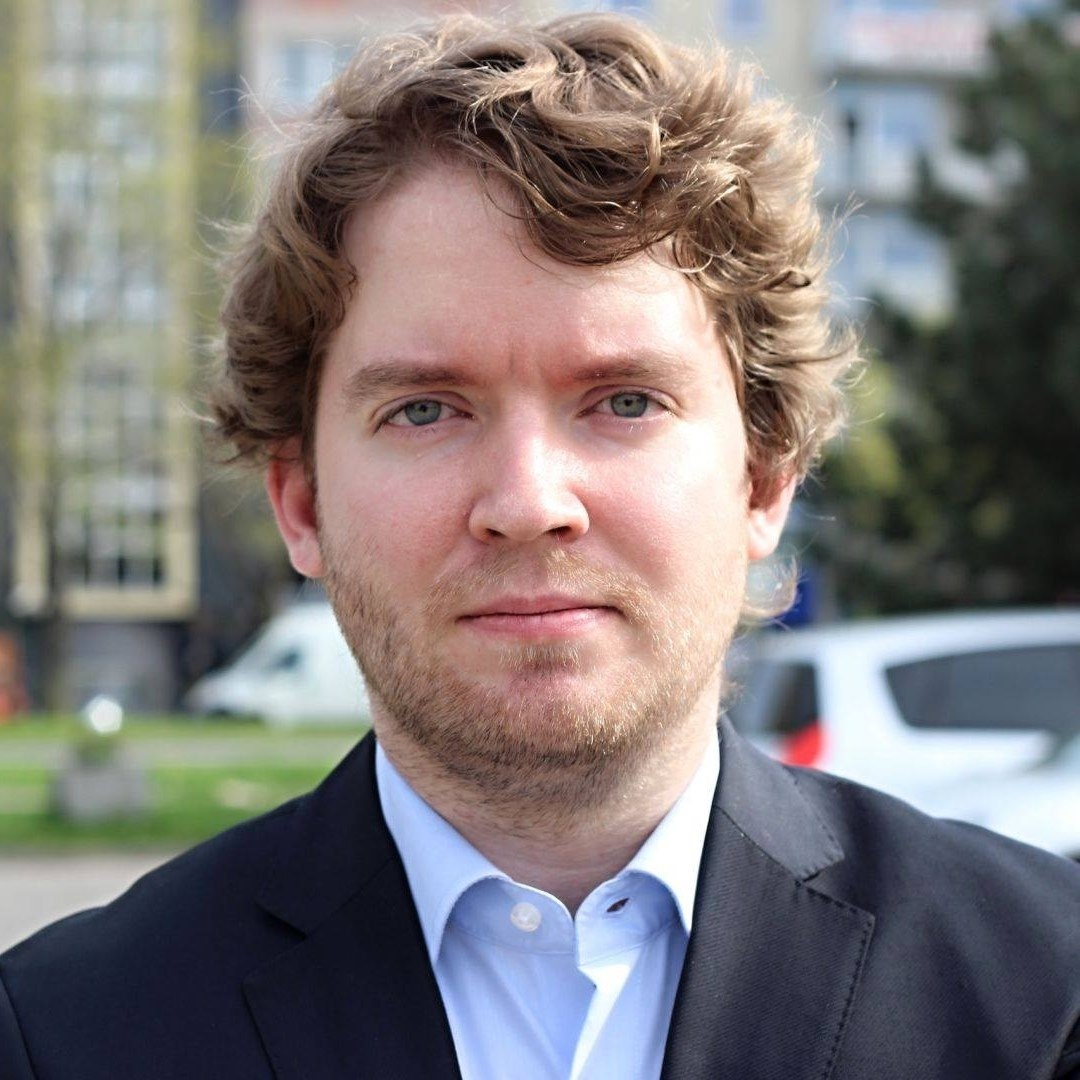
- Ábel Ravasz in 2019

Plenipotentiary for Roma Communities
- In office 6 April 2016 – 1 April 2020
- Preceded by: Peter Pollák
- Succeeded by: Andrea Bučková

Personal details
- Born: 14 January 1986 (age 40) Dunajská Streda, Czechoslovakia (now Slovakia)
- Party: Most-Híd (2016-2020)
- Children: 1
- Education: Columbia University

Ábel Ravasz (born January 14, 1986, Dunajská Streda) is a Slovakia-based sociologist and politician. Between 2016 and 2020, he worked as the Slovak government's plenipotentiary for Roma communities. He currently works as advisor to Slovakia's minister of education, Tomáš Drucker.

== Background ==
His father, Marián Ravasz, is an architect. His mother, Ilona Németh, is a visual artist and university professor. He belongs to the Hungarian community in Slovakia.

He studied sociology at the Eötvös Loránd University in Budapest (2006 – 2011), political science and economy at the Corvinus University of Budapest (2004 – 2012). In 2012, he became the recipient of a Fulbright Scholarship for Graduate Studies in the USA, and in 2014, he attained a master's degree in sociology at the Columbia University in New York City.

== Career ==
In 2013, he became the co-founder of the NGO Purt, an interethnic network of Roma, Hungarian and Slovak activists supporting marginalized communities in the Gemer region.

In 2014, he founded the Mathias Bel Institute, an NGO specializing in the research of minority communities and activism in the area of minority rights.

In 2016, he was named the Slovak government's plenipotentiary for Roma communities, a position he held until 2020. As such, he was the initiator of several legislative changes, including compulsory preschool education for all 5-year-olds, the founding of the country's new Fund for the Support of Minority Cultures, and others.

Between 2016 and 2020, he was vice-chairman of the interethnic Most–Híd party. In 2023 he ran for office on the Sloboda a Solidarita party ticket.

In 2025, he became the recipient of Columbia University's GSAS Outstanding Recent Alumni Award.
