= Lucia Kleštincová =

Co-President of Volt Slovakia
- In office 3 February 2024 – today

Personal details
- Born: 18 July 1985 (age 40) Bratislava
- Party: Volt
- Education: master's degree in Management in Public Administration
- Alma mater: London School of Economics and Political Science; University of Economics in Bratislava

Lucia Kleštincová (born 18 July 1985 in Bratislava) is a European policy and digitalisation expert, career coach for women in leadership positions, citizen activist author and co-chair of the Volt Slovakia party. She is her party's lead candidate in the 2024 European elections.

== Childhood and education ==
Kleštincová was born in Bratislava on 18 July 1985 and grew up in Petržalka, Bratislava.

From 2003, she studied at the Faculty of International Relations at the University of Economics in Bratislava. She graduated in 2008 with the Rector's Award for the best student. In 2006, she completed an Erasmus exchange programme at the Faculty of Management at the University of Ghent in Belgium and in 2008 a Leonardo da Vinci stay in Granada, Spain.

During her studies at university, she gained experience in the field of public administration and diplomacy, for example in the Department of Protocol and International Relations of the National Council of the Slovak Republic, in the Department of Human Rights of the Ministry of Foreign Affairs of the Slovak Republic or in the Consular Section of the Embassy of the Slovak Republic in London. At the consulting firm Weastra, she was involved in providing strategic advice to companies wishing to establish themselves on the Central European markets. She then left her post at the Embassy of the Republic of Turkey in Bratislava due to an offer for further studies. In the 2009/2010 academic year, she studied at the London School of Economics and Political Science, where she received her MSc. in management in Public Administration.

In 2016, Kleštincová completed the IT Business Agility programme at the Solvay Brussels School of Economics and Management. She has participated in several project management and leadership courses. She is particularly interested in promoting female leadership and soft skills as a key to reforming the functioning of organisations and the state. In 2020, she was certified as a coach through the ICF-accredited Executive, Careers and Life Coaching programme at Kingstown College in Dublin.

== Career ==
After graduating in London, Kleštincová worked as an analyst and consultant at the IT company PosAm from 2010 to 2013, working on e-government support and also leading pro bono projects aimed at connecting universities with labour market needs and introducing graduate employability monitoring in practice.

In 2013, Kleštincová was recruited by the European institutions following a selection procedure. In the following ten years, she worked as a policy advisor for the promotion of industrial competitiveness at the European Commission (Directorate-General for Internal Market, Industry, Entrepreneurship and SMEs). She worked on measures to promote the digital single market, the use of technology to modernise industry and public administration. She worked as an advisor on digitalisation and skills in the Department of Tourism and in the Department of Electronic Public Procurement. During the Slovak Presidency of the Council of the EU, she was seconded to the Representation of the Slovak Republic to the European Institutions and worked in the team for proposals in the field of electronic public administration. Following the Brexit referendum, her role as Senior Management Adviser to the European Commission in the field of competitiveness expanded to include the coordination of preparations for the UK's withdrawal from the EU single market.

As part of activities aimed at bringing a new quality of leadership to the European institutions, she chaired a strategic working group on improving the quality of work with talent, chaired an expert group on the use of data in the public policy-making process and founded several groups to support the personal and professional development of women, including the Club of Slovenian Women in the European Commission. Following these activities, she was also nominated as a member of Commissioner Helena Dalli's Task Force on Gender Equality and as a representative of the European Commission at G20 level as part of the Empower project on women's empowerment in G20 countries.

In recent years, Kleštincová has focused on career coaching, specialising in female leadership, burnout prevention and social impact. She also works as a facilitator, speaker or workshop leader for organisations pursuing similar goals.

== Political activity ==
In the 2019 European Parliament elections, she ran for the Progressive Slovakia - Democrats (Slovakia). With 20.11% of the vote, the coalition came first in the election. Lucia received 14,894 preferential votes, moving her from the original tenth place on the coalition's list of candidates to eighth place, but still did not enter the European Parliament.

In March 2023, she became co-chair of the Volt Slovakia party of the pan-European political movement Volt Europa. In November 2023, Kleštincová was elected the lead candidate for the 2024 European elections.

== Projects and lecture activities ==
Lucia Kleštincová is involved in projects to support and modernise education in Slovakia by linking education and practice and supporting women who want to better express their talents and mission in their organisations, rise to leadership positions or get involved in the IT sector.

- Connecting universities with the labour market: Kleštincová was the founder and leader of the project under the auspices of the Institute for Economic Policy and the main partner of the project at PosAm. The aim of the project was to draw the attention of the general and professional public to the need to monitor the practical application of graduates as a necessary condition for the future improvement of higher education. Kleštincová also led the project's media campaign entitled "Don't have a salami", in which several well-known Slovak personalities participated (e.g. Michal Truban, Michal Meško, Matúš Vallo). As part of the campaign, hundreds of thousands of secondary school students were able to learn more about current trends on the labour market and in-demand qualifications.
- Teacher 2020: She co-founded the Teacher 2020 initiative, which aims to improve the status of teachers, including the financial income of teachers, increase the popularity of the teaching profession, attract excellent people to the Slovak education system and ensure quality teachers for pupils and students in Slovakia.
- You too in IT: She is an ambassador of the initiative for women interested in working in the IT sector. In addition to a series of one-day events, the initiative also co-operates with other important projects to promote women in IT. For example, the Mini Tech MBA for women. The project aims to promote the careers of women in IT and show that women belong in IT.

Lucia Kleštincová regularly lectures on education, the new leadership culture, supporting women and mental health in the workplace, and modernising public administration through a new talent management policy. She regularly participates in conferences such as Profesia Days or career workshops at schools, where she shares her experience of career planning in Brussels and in European institutions, for example at Profesia Days 2022 Bratislava.

== Publications ==
- Podcast Lights on Europe
- Lights on Europe: On values guiding the careers of leaders who shine. 2020. ISBN 978-2-9602675-0-1

== Awards ==
- 2008: Prize of the Rector of the Bratislava University of Economics for the best student
- 2020: Santander-CIDOB 35 under 35
