= Judita Laššáková =

Slovak politician (born 1977)

Judita Laššáková MEP
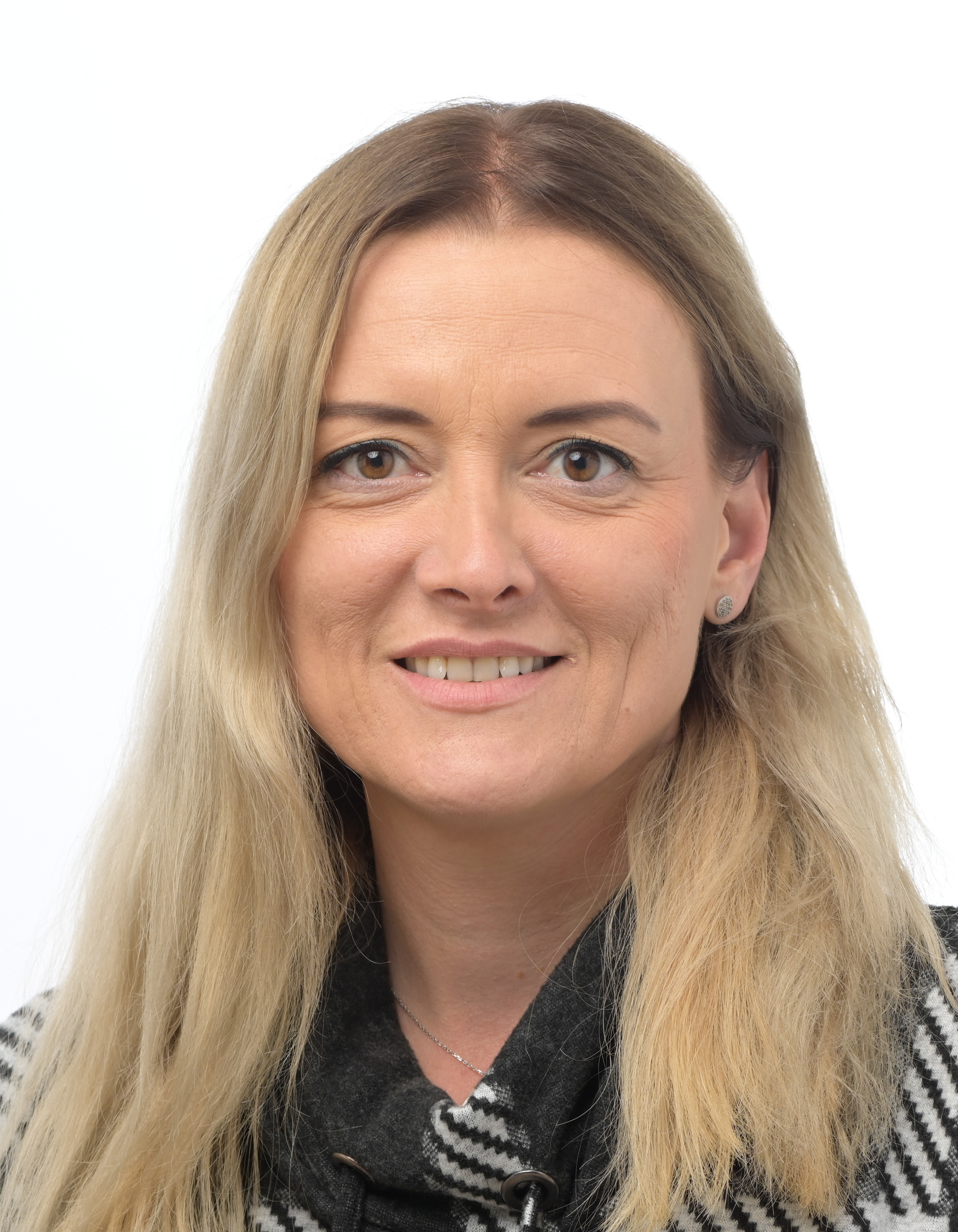
- Laššáková in 2024

Member of the European Parliament for Slovakia
- Incumbent
- Assumed office 16 July 2024

Personal details
- Born: 4 December 1977 (age 48) Bratislava, Czechoslovakia
- Party: Smer–SD (2024–); Slovak National Party (until 2023)
- Relations: Mercedes Galisová (niece)
- Education: Pan-European University

Judita Laššáková (born 4 December 1977) is a Slovak politician of Smer–SD who was elected member of the European Parliament in 2024. She previously worked as assistant to MEPs Miroslav Radačovský and Lívia Járóka.

== Biography ==
Laššáková was born on 4 December 1977 in Bratislava and grew up in Nové Zámky. She studied law at the Pan-European University. She became popular on social media during the COVID-19 pandemic, when she was a face of the protests against lockdowns and vaccination. Since then, she has established herself as a host of far-right media online broadcasts. In 2022 she unsuccessfully ran for the mayor on Nové Zámky.

Laššáková is married.
