= 2019 European Parliament election in Slovakia =

- 25 May 2019

All 14 Slovak seats in the European Parliament
- Turnout: 1,006,351 (22.74%) ▲9.69 pp
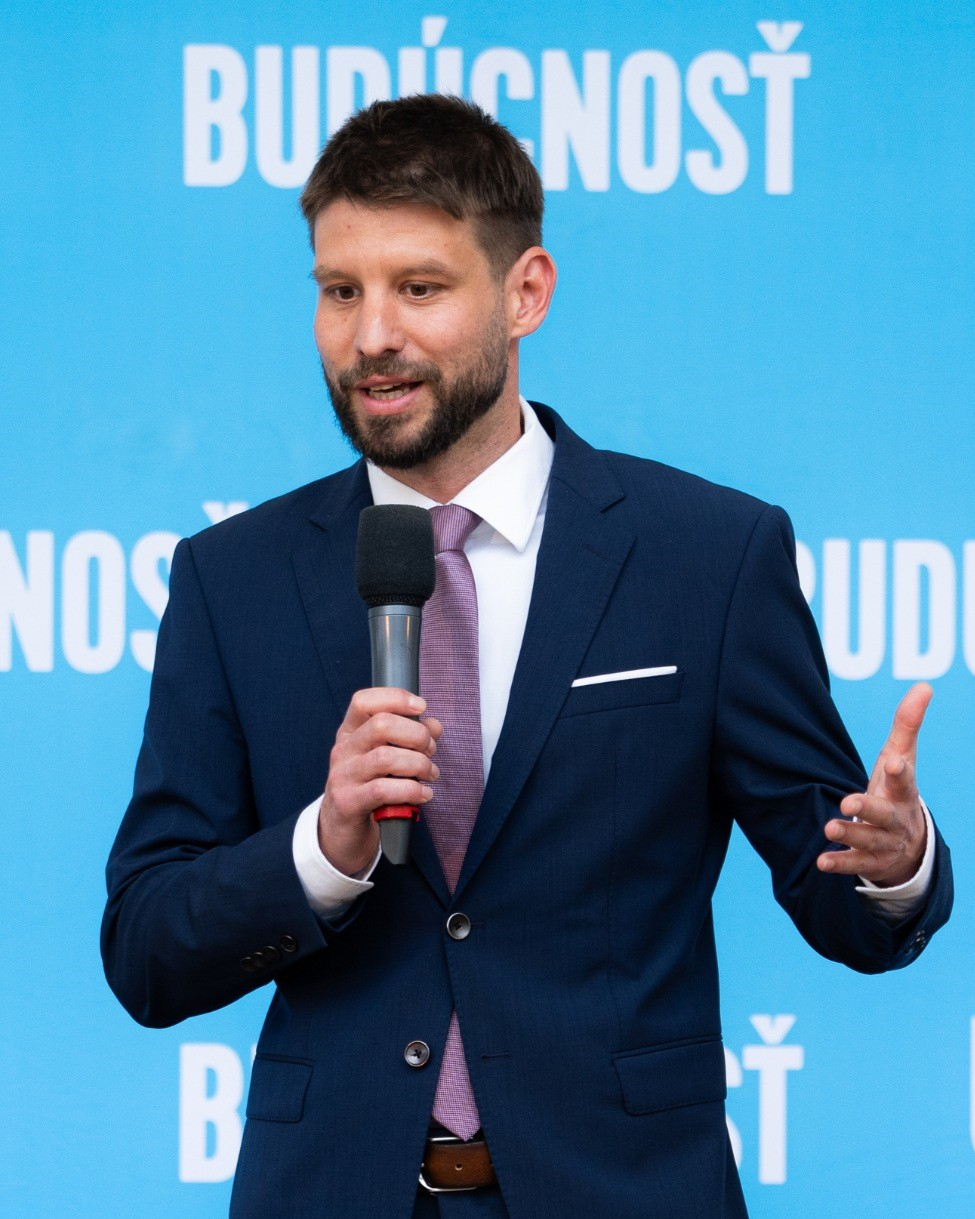

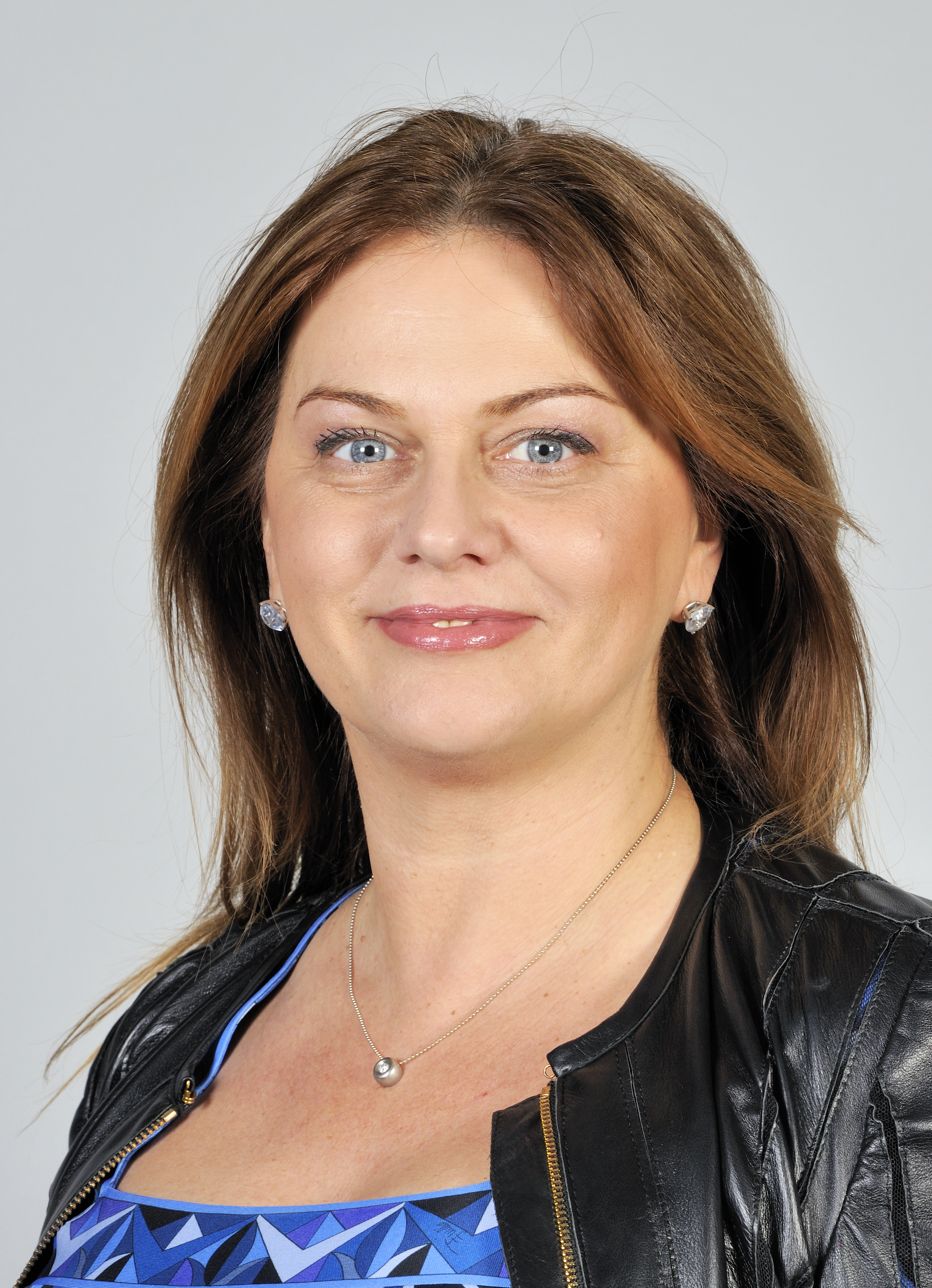

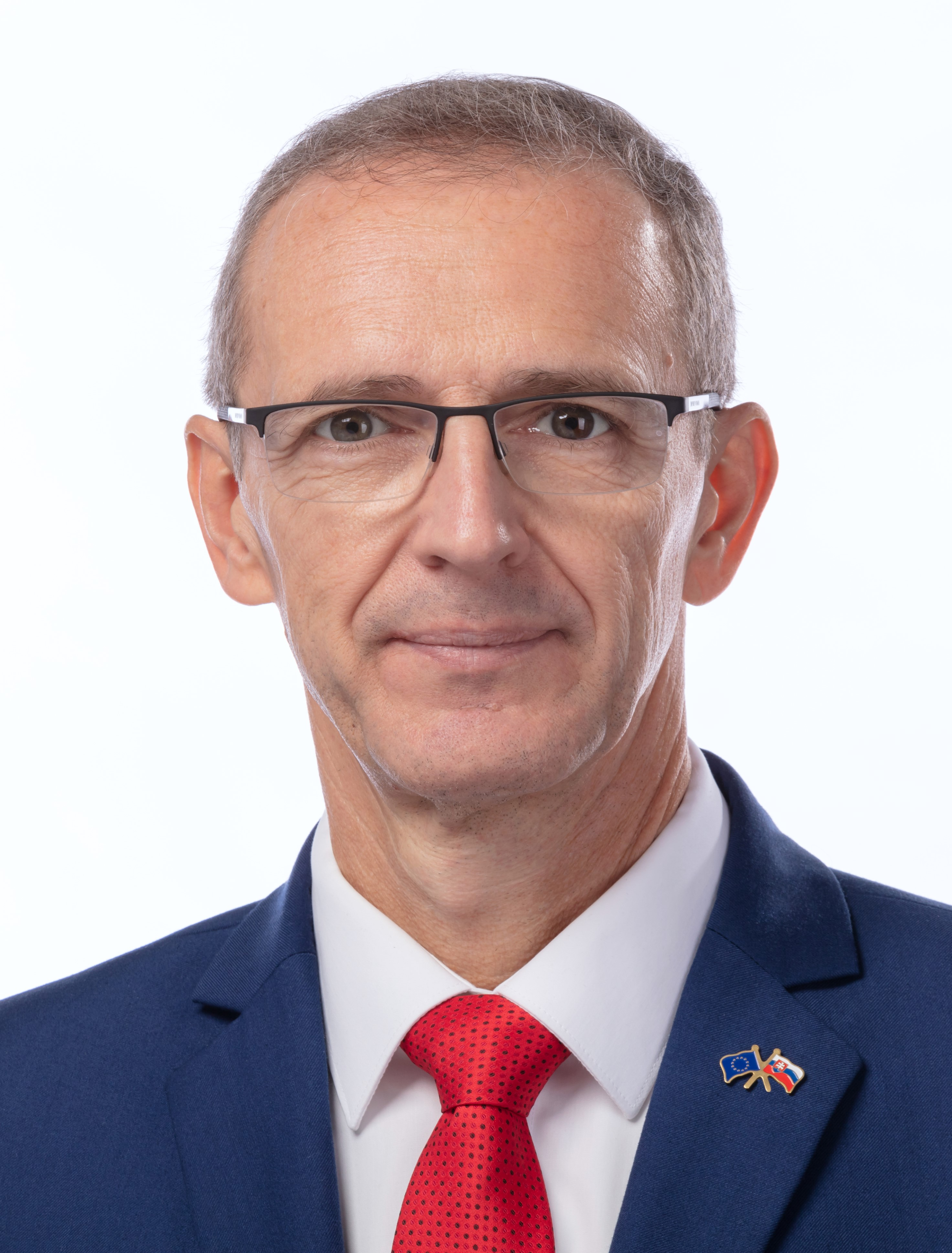

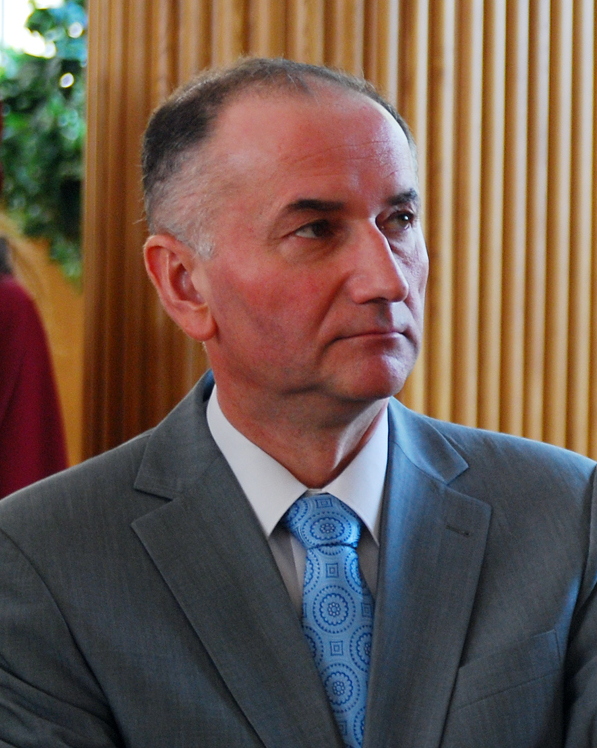

| | First party | Second party | Third party |
|---|---|---|---|
| Leader | Michal Šimečka | Monika Beňová | Martin Beluský |
| Party | PS / Spolu-OD | Smer-SD | ĽSNS |
| Alliance | ALDE / EPP | S&D | APF |
| Last election | New party | 4 seats, 24.1% | 0 seat, 1.7% |
| Seats won | 4 | 3 | 2 |
| Seat change | ▲4 | ▼1 | ▲2 |
| Popular vote | 198,255 | 154,996 | 118,995 |
| Percentage | 20.11% | 15.72% | 12.07% |
| Swing | ▲20.11 | ▼8.38 | ▲10.33 |
| | Fourth party | Fifth party | Sixth party |
| Leader | Ivan Štefanec | Eugen Jurzyca | Michal Šipoš |
| Party | KDH | SaS | OĽaNO |
| Alliance | EPP | ECR | EPP |
| Last election | 2 seats, 10.9% | 1 seat, 6.7% | 1 seat, 7.5% |
| Seats won | 2 | 2 | 1 |
| Seat change | Steady | ▲1 | Steady |
| Popular vote | 95,588 | 94,839 | 51,834 |
| Percentage | 9.70% | 9.62% | 5.26% |
| Swing | ▼3.52 | ▲2.95 | ▼2.20 |
- Results by district

Elections for the 2019 European Parliament election took place in Slovakia on 25 May 2019. Thirty-one parties featured on the electoral list. The election was won by alliance of Progressive Slovakia and TOGETHER - Civic Democracy. It was the first election since 2006 that was won by some other party than Direction – Social Democracy.

== Main contesting parties ==
| Name | | Ideology | Leader |
|---|---|---|---|
| PS/Spolu-OD | Progressive Slovakia-Together – Civic Democracy; Progresívne Slovensko - Spolu-občianska demokracia | Social liberalism | Michal Truban; Miroslav Beblavý |
| Smer-SD | Direction - social democracy Smer - sociálna demokracia | Left-wing populism | Robert Fico |
| ĽSNS | People's Party - Our Slovakia; Ľudová strana - naše Slovensko | Neo-nazism | Marian Kotleba |
| KDH | Christian Democratic Movement; Kresťanskodemokratické hnutie | Christian democracy | Alojz Hlina |
| SaS | Freedom and Solidarity; Sloboda a Solidarita | Liberalism | Richard Sulík |
| OĽaNO | Ordinary people and independent personalities Obyčajní ľudia a nezávislé osobnosti | Populism | Igor Matovič |
| SMK-MKP | Party of the Hungarian Community; Strana maďarskej komunity - Magyar Közösség Pártja | Hungarian minority interests | József Menyhárt |
| SNS | Slovak National Party; Slovenská národná strana | National conservatism | Andrej Danko |
| KÚ | Christian Union; Kresťanská únia | Christian right | Anna Záborská |
| SR | We Are Family; Sme rodina | Right-wing populism | Boris Kollár |

== Results ==
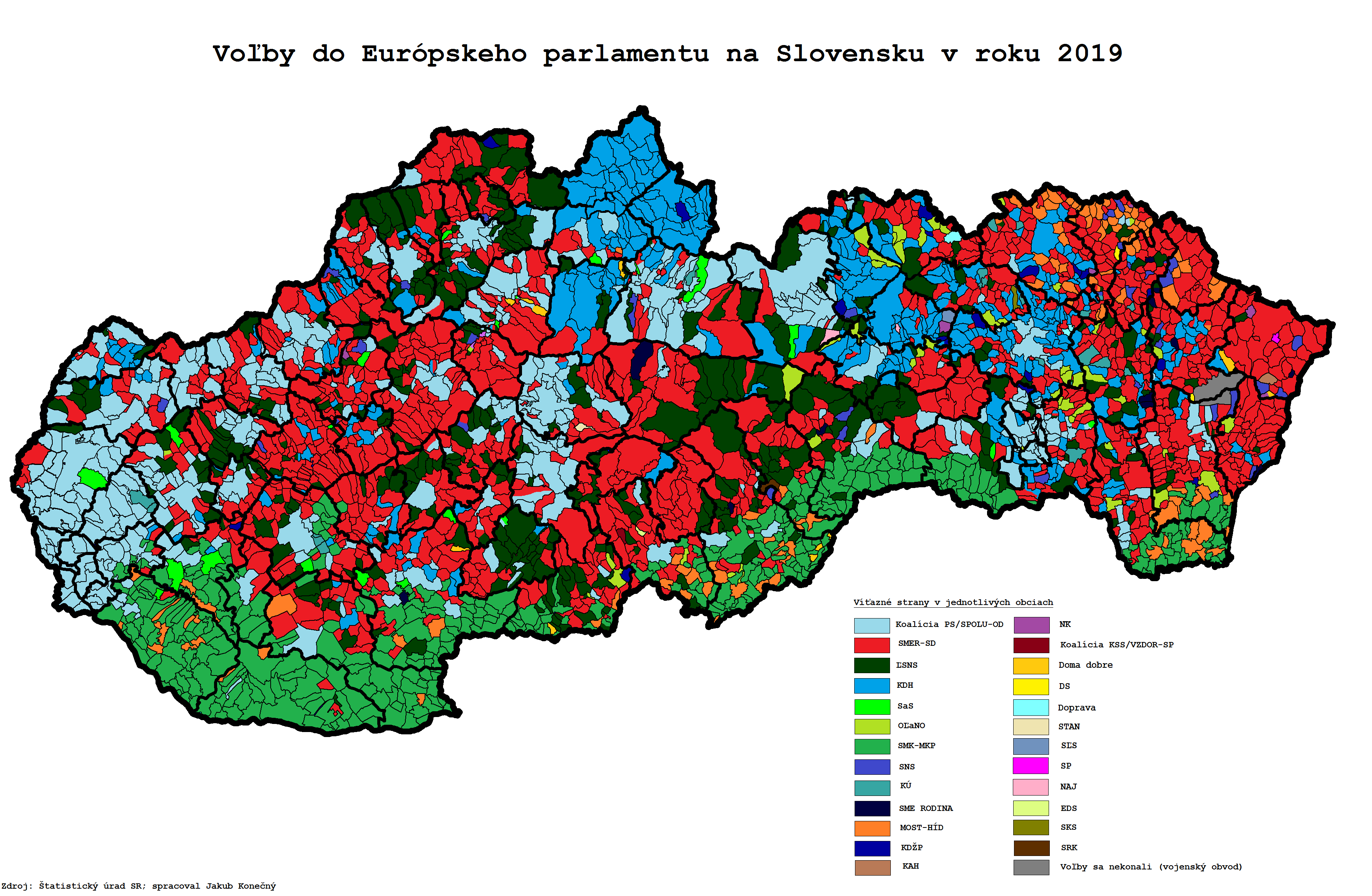
Results of the election, showing vote strength by municipality.

| Party | Votes | % | +/– | Seats | +/– |
|---|---|---|---|---|---|
| Progressive Slovakia–SPOLU | 198,255 | 20.11 | New | 4 | New |
| Direction – Social Democracy | 154,996 | 15.72 | −8.38 | 3 | –1 |
| People's Party Our Slovakia | 118,995 | 12.07 | +10.33 | 2 | +2 |
| Christian Democratic Movement | 95,588 | 9.70 | −3.52 | 2 | 0 |
| Freedom and Solidarity | 94,839 | 9.62 | +2.95 | 2 | +1 |
| Ordinary People and Independent Personalities | 51,834 | 5.26 | −2.20 | 1 | 0 |
| Party of the Hungarian Community | 48,929 | 4.96 | −1.57 | 0 | –1 |
| Slovak National Party | 40,330 | 4.09 | +0.48 | 0 | 0 |
| Christian Union | 37,974 | 3.85 | New | 0 | New |
| We Are Family | 31,840 | 3.23 | New | 0 | New |
| Most–Híd | 25,562 | 2.59 | −3.24 | 0 | –1 |
| Christian Democracy – Life and Prosperity | 20,374 | 2.07 | New | 0 | New |
| CORRECTION - Andrej Hryc | 8,460 | 0.86 | New | 0 | New |
| Slovak Green Party | 7,845 | 0.80 | New | 0 | New |
| National Coalition | 7,145 | 0.72 | –0.77 | 0 | 0 |
| Communist Party of Slovakia–VZDOR | 6,199 | 0.63 | –0.89 | 0 | 0 |
| Good Home | 6,124 | 0.62 | New | 0 | New |
| Democratic Party | 5,092 | 0.52 | New | 0 | New |
| Transportation | 3,998 | 0.41 | New | 0 | New |
| Mayors and Independent Candidates | 2,976 | 0.30 | New | 0 | New |
| Slovak People's Party Andrej Hlinka | 2,953 | 0.30 | New | 0 | New |
| Labour Party | 2,657 | 0.27 | New | 0 | New |
| Hungarian Christian Democratic Alliance | 2,270 | 0.23 | +0.02 | 0 | 0 |
| Direct Democracy | 2,222 | 0.23 | –0.20 | 0 | 0 |
| Voice of the People | 2,101 | 0.21 | New | 0 | New |
| Independence and Unity | 2,016 | 0.20 | New | 0 | New |
| European Democratic Party | 1,452 | 0.15 | –0.52 | 0 | 0 |
| Tolerance and Coexistence Party | 918 | 0.09 | New | 0 | New |
| Slovak National Unity – Patriotic Party | 621 | 0.06 | New | 0 | New |
| Slovak Conservative Party | 603 | 0.06 | New | 0 | New |
| Party of the Roma Coalition | 512 | 0.05 | New | 0 | New |
| Total | 985,680 | 100.00 | – | 14 | +1 |
| Valid votes | 985,680 | 97.95 | | | |
| Invalid/blank votes | 20,671 | 2.05 | | | |
| Total votes | 1,006,351 | 100.00 | | | |
| Registered voters/turnout | 4,429,801 | 22.72 | | | |
Source: Volby

Popular vote
| PS-Spolu | 20.11% |
| Smer-SD | 15.72% |
| ĽSNS | 12.07% |
| KDH | 9.70% |
| SaS | 9.62% |
| OĽaNO | 5.26% |
| SMK-MKP | 4.96% |
| SNS | 4.09% |
| KÚ | 3.85% |
| SR | 3.23% |

=== European groups ===
| European group | | Seats 2014 | Seats 2019 | Change |
| European People's Party | EPP | 6 | 5 | 1 ▼ |
| Progressive Alliance of Socialists and Democrats | S&D | 4 | 3 | 1 ▼ |
| European Conservatives and Reformists | ECR | 2 | 2 | 0 |
| Alliance of Liberals and Democrats for Europe | ALDE | 1 | 2 | 1 ▲ |
| Non-Inscrits | NI | 0 | 2 | 2 ▲ |
| | | 13 | 14 | |

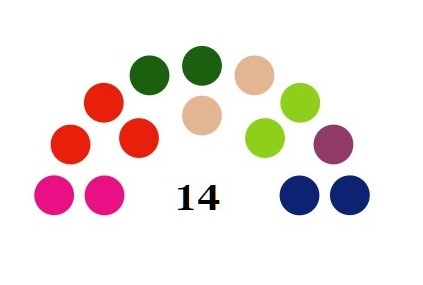
Seat distribution

=== Elected members ===
PS – ALDE

1. Michal Šimečka, by 81,735 preferential votes
2. Martin Hojsík, by 27,549 preferential votes

SPOLU – EPP

1. Michal Wiezik, by 29,998 preferential votes (now he is member of PS and Renew Europe)
2. Vladimír Bilčík, by 26,202 preferential votes

Smer – S&D

1. Monika Beňová, by 89,472 preferential votes
2. Miroslav Číž, by 51,362 preferential votes
3. Robert Hajšel, by 13,773 preferential votes

ĽSNS – APF

1. Milan Uhrík, by 42,779 preferential votes (now he is leader of movement Republika)
2. Miroslav Radačovský, by 42,276 preferential votes (now he is leader of Slovak patriot)

KDH – EPP

1. Ivan Štefanec, by 33,128 preferential votes
2. Miriam Lexmann, by 27,833 preferential votes

SaS – AECR

1. Lucia Ďuriš Nicholsonová, by 52,331 preferential votes (now she left SaS and she became independent on slovak national level, on EU level she became member of Renew Europe)
2. Eugen Jurzyca, by 33,540 preferential votes

OĽaNO – EPP

1. Peter Pollák, by 23,815 preferential votes

Slovakia (14)
| Michal Šimečka | RE |
| Michal Wiezik | EPP |
| Martin Hojsík | RE |
| Vladimír Bilčík | EPP |
| Monika Beňová | S&D |
| Miroslav Číž | S&D |
| Robert Hajšel | S&D |
| Milan Uhrík | NI |
| Miroslav Radačovský | NI |
| Ivan Štefanec | EPP |
| Miriam Lexmann | EPP |
| Lucia Ďuriš Nicholsonová | ECR |
| Eugen Jurzyca | ECR |
| Peter Pollák | EPP |

=== Post-election changes of European political parties ===
On 5 June, Peter Pollák announced that he is switching from AECR to EPP.

Lucia Ďuriš Nicholsonová switched from ECR to Renew Europe.

Michal Wiezik switched from EPP to Renew Europe.

| EPP | S&D | RE | ECR | G–EFA | GUE/NGL | ID | Non-inscrits |
|---|---|---|---|---|---|---|---|
| 4 | 3 | 4 | 1 | 0 | 0 | 0 | 2 |

== Opinion polls ==
| Date | Polling firm | Sample size | Smer–SD | SaS | OĽaNO | SNS | Kotleba–ĽSNS | Sme Rodina | Most–Híd | KDH | SMK-MKP | KSS | SZS | PS | PD | DOPRAVA | Lead |
|---|---|---|---|---|---|---|---|---|---|---|---|---|---|---|---|---|---|
| 25 May 2019 | Election | | 15.7% | 9.6% | 5.3% | 4.1% | 12.1% | 3.2% | 2.6% | 9.7% | 5.0% | 0.6% | 0.8% | 20.1% | 0.2% | 0.4% | 4.4% |
| 18 April – 9 May 2019 | Phoenix | 1,087 | 22.5% | 14.3% | 13.9% | 8.1% | 13.8% | 12.3% | 5.0% | 9.9% | 0.0% | 0.0% | 0.0% | 11.8% | 0.0% | 5.2% | 8.2% |
| 1–15 March 2019 | Focus | 1,590 | 21.6% | 11.3% | 11.0% | 6.0% | 12.9% | 9.2% | 4.0% | 8.9% | 3.2% | 1.8% | 1.1% | 8.1% | 0.0% | 0.0% | 8.7% |

== Parties ==
1. SMER
2. Kresťanská demokracia (Christian Democracy)
3. Kotleba – People's Party Our Slovakia
4. Korektúra
5. Slovak National Party
6. We Are Family
7. Ordinary People
8. Starostovia a nezávislí kandidáti
9. Strana práce
10. Strana tolerancie a spolunažívania
11. Hlas ľudu
12. Maďarská kresťanskodemokratická aliancia
13. Doprava
14. Christian Democratic Movement
15. Slovak Green Party
16. Most–Híd
17. PRIAMA DEMOKRACIA
18. Strana rómskej koalície - SRK
19. Slovak Conservative Party
20. Slovenská národná jednota
21. Party of the Hungarian Community
22. Doma dobre
23. Communist Party of Slovakia and VZDOR
24. EURÓPSKA DEMOKRATICKÁ STRANA
25. Freedom and Solidarity
26. Slovenská ľudová strana Andreja Hlinku
27. NAJ – Nezávislosť a Jednota
28. Kresťanská únia
29. Progressive Slovakia and TOGETHER – Civic Democracy
30. Demokratická strana
31. Národná koalícia
