= Volt Slovakia =

Political party in Slovakia

Volt Slovakia Volt Slovensko
- Abbreviation: Volt
- Spokesperson: Andrea Danihelová
- Co-chairs: Rick Zedník; Lucia Kleštincová
- Founded: May 2023
- Registered: 12 February 2024
- Headquarters: Bratislava
- Ideology: Social liberalism; Pro-Europeanism; European federalism
- European political alliance: Volt Europa
- Colors: Purple
- National Council: 0 / 150
- European Parliament: 0 / 15

Website
- www.voltslovensko.org

Volt Slovakia (Slovak: Volt Slovensko, Volt) is a political party in Slovakia and the Slovak branch of Volt Europa, a federalist and progressive European political alliance, which advocates for greater European cooperation across Europe.

== Policies ==
The party's declared goal is to regain trust in politics and break with the old structures of politics in Slovakia. To this purpose, the party wants to focus on cross-border cooperation and Europe to solve problems such as climate change or economic recovery after the COVID-19 pandemic.

The party is committed to a tolerant, open society and LGBTQ rights.

The party supports sanctions against Russia and arms deliveries to Ukraine in the context of the Russo-Ukrainian war.

== History ==
Volt Slovakia was founded in May 2023 by Rick Zedník and Lucia Kleštincová and began the process of official registration as a party. To do so, the movement needs 10,000 signatures of support, which it must submit to the Ministry of the Interior. In December 2023, the movement announced that it had collected the necessary signatures. The founding party conference took place in Bratislava on 3 February 2024. Lucia Kleštincová and Rick Zedník were elected as Co-Presidents and additionally Zuzana Púčiková as Interim Co-President for the campaign for the European elections. The party was officially registered by the Ministry of the Interior on 12 February 2024. The party is preparing to participate in the European elections 2024, in which it is running with a list of 10 candidates. The top candidate is Lucia Kleštincová, who was elected in November 2023.

== Elections ==
=== 2024 European elections ===
The top candidate for the European elections in 2024 is Lucia Kleštincová, who was elected in November 2023. At its founding party conference on 3 February 2024, the party's complete list of 10 candidates was elected. It is based on gender parity with alternating representation. The party's programme is the one adopted by Volt Europa in November 2023, which is shared by all national Volt parties.

== Election results ==
=== European Parliament ===
Election	List leader	Votes	%	Rank	Seats	+/–	EP Group
2024	Lucia Kleštincová	1,923	0.13%	15th	0 / 15	New	–
