= Miroslav Číž =

Slovak politician (1954–2022)

Miroslav Číž MEP
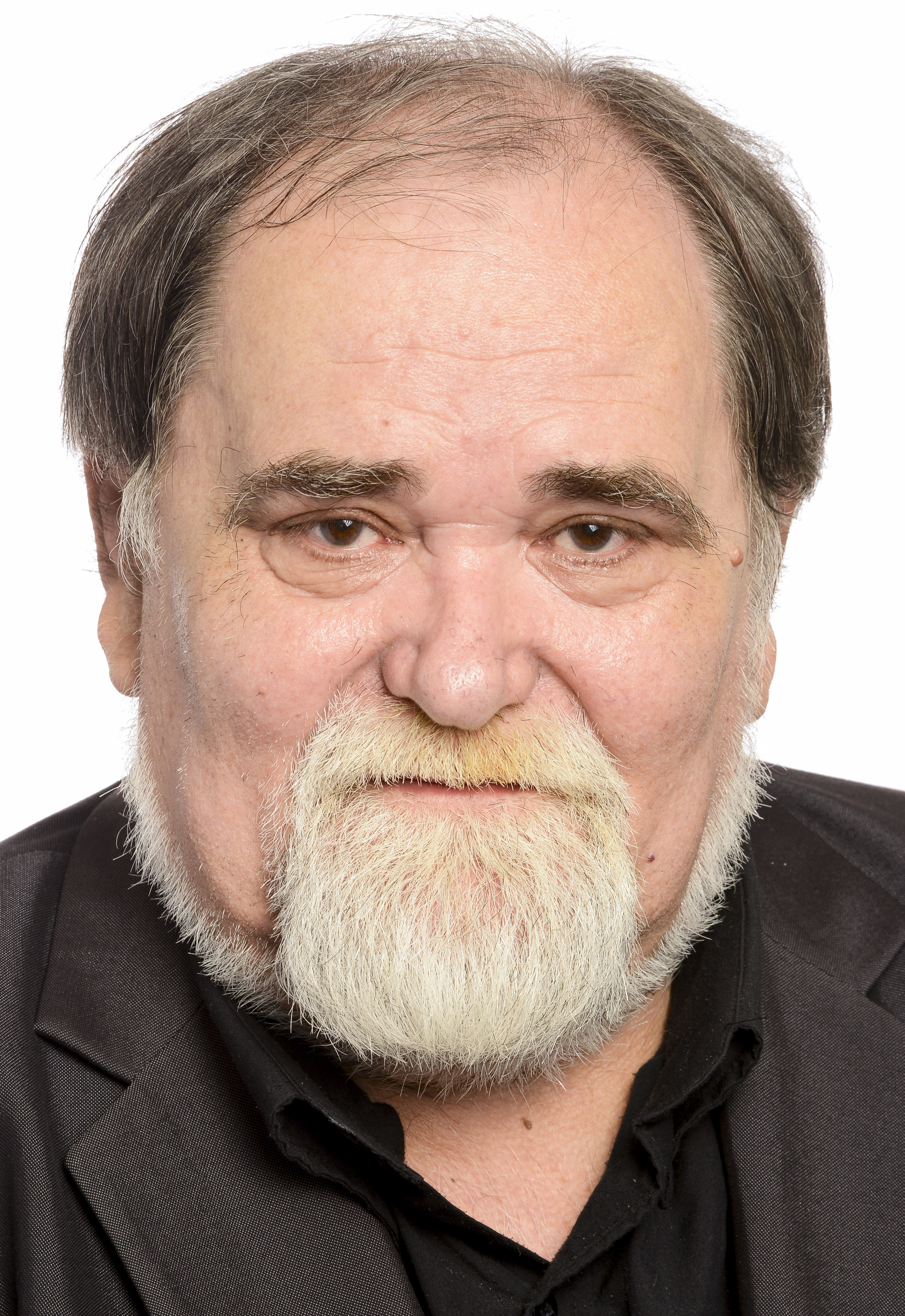

Member of the European Parliament for Slovakia
- In office 2 July 2019 – 29 December 2022
- Succeeded by: Katarína Roth Neveďalová

Member of the National Council
- In office 15 October 2002 – 28 June 2019

Personal details
- Born: 11 February 1954 Banská Štiavnica, Czechoslovakia
- Died: 29 December 2022 (aged 68)
- Party: Communist Party (1972–1990); Party of the Democratic Left (1990–1999); Direction-Social Democracy (1999–2022)

Miroslav Číž (11 February 1954 – 29 December 2022) was a Slovak politician who served as a Member of the European Parliament from 2019 until his death in 2022.

Číž was born in Banská Štiavnica. He studied law at the Comenius University, graduating in 1978. He later taught at the university.

During socialism, he served as a high-ranking official of the National Committees of the Communist Party of Czechoslovakia. After the fall of the regime, he remained in the Communist Party of Slovakia, which was later renamed the Party of the Democratic Left. In the 1990s, he held several official positions in the National Council of Slovakia. In 1999, he was in the group of members of the Democratic Left, led by Robert Fico, who left the party and founded the Direction party. Thus, since 2002 he has been a member of the National Council and from 2006 to 2010 and 2014 to 2016 he was its Deputy Speaker.

Číž died on 29 December 2022, at the age of 68. His seat was taken by Katarína Roth Neveďalová.

== Chicken leg incident ==
The incident regarding chicken legs happened on 18 June 2019, in the canteen of the National Council (Slovakia). The canteen has a menu consisting of various meals, from which MPs can choose. After voting in the parliament, at approximately 2 pm Číž asked the serving cook for a chicken leg from the menu. The cook told him that the canteen was out of chicken legs and offered him to choose from among the rest of the available meals. According to another MP that was around at that moment, Oto Žarnay, Číž started yelling at the cook for not having chicken legs. After a while he asked for the chef of the canteen. Číž then yelled at him as well and finally threatened the chef that he would make sure he gets fired.

"He shouted that it was outrageous and in 30 years he had not experienced such a thing that they do not have the food he chose in the parliamentary canteen. The cook, tried to explain to him in a decent way that she had other dishes to choose from, which he vehemently refused and wanted a chicken leg. He also said that she should be ashamed that they no longer had the chicken leg, and let her apologize to him."says Žarnay.
