= Róbert Hajšel =

Slovak politician

Róbert Hajšel MEP
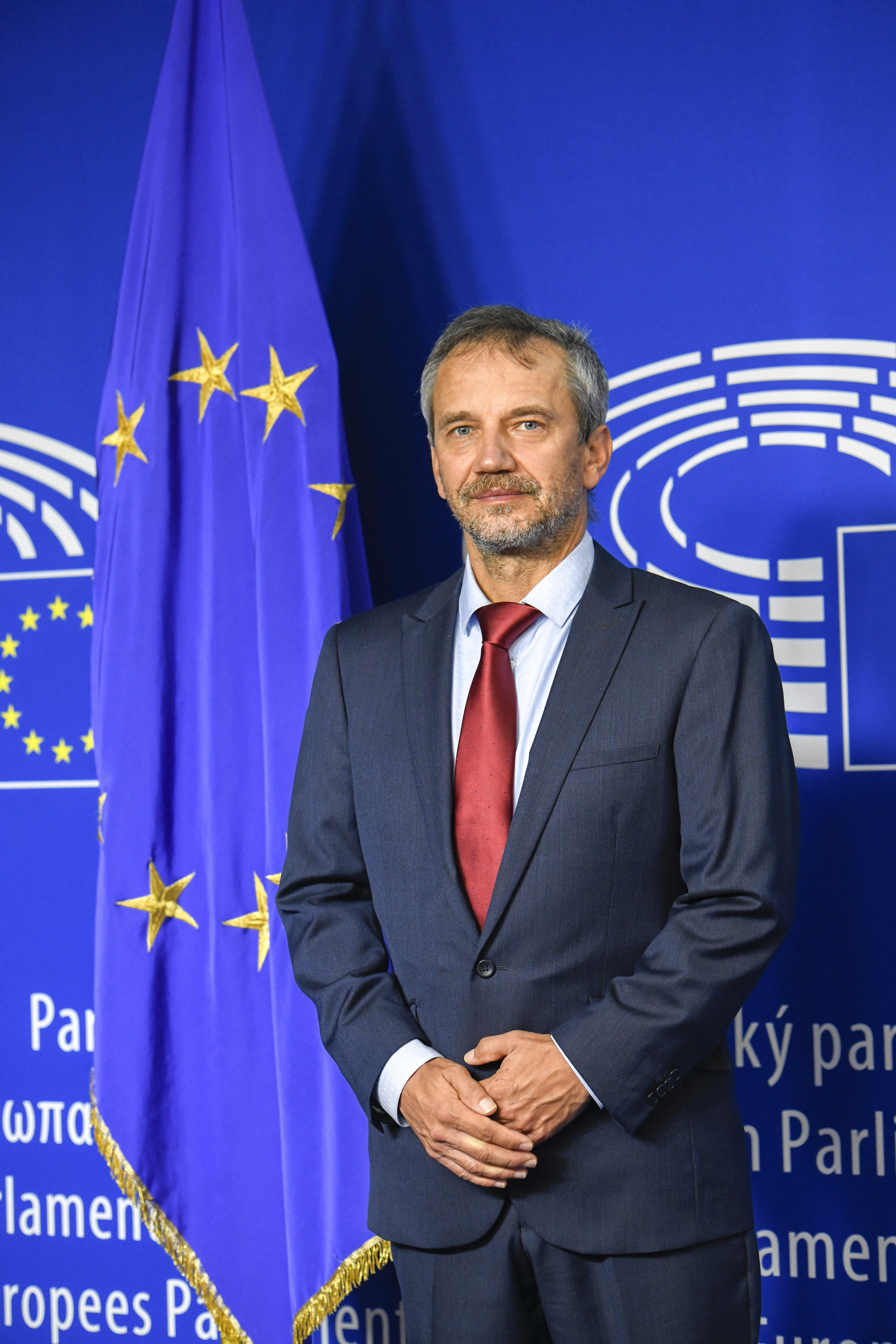

Member of the European Parliament for Slovakia
- In office 2 July 2019 – 15 July 2024

Personal details
- Born: 28 March 1967 (age 59) Slovakia
- Party: [independent]
- Occupation: Politician

Robert Hajšel (born 28 March 1967) is a Slovak politician who was elected as a Member of the European Parliament in 2019.
