= VZDOR =

Far-left political party in Slovakia

RESISTANCE – Labor Party VZDOR – strana práce
- Leader: Miroslav Pomajdík
- Founded: 20 February 2014
- Headquarters: Valaská Dubová 102, Valaská Dubová
- Membership (2020): 40
- Ideology: Communism; Marxism–Leninism
- Political position: Far-left
- International affiliation: ICOR

Website
- www.vzdor.org

VZDOR – strana práce (lit. 'RESISTANCE – Labor Party') is a far-left political party in Slovakia, formed in 2014. It contested the European Parliament election in 2019 in conjunction with the Communist Party of Slovakia.
