= Vladimír Bilčík =

Slovak politician

Vladimír Bilčík MEP
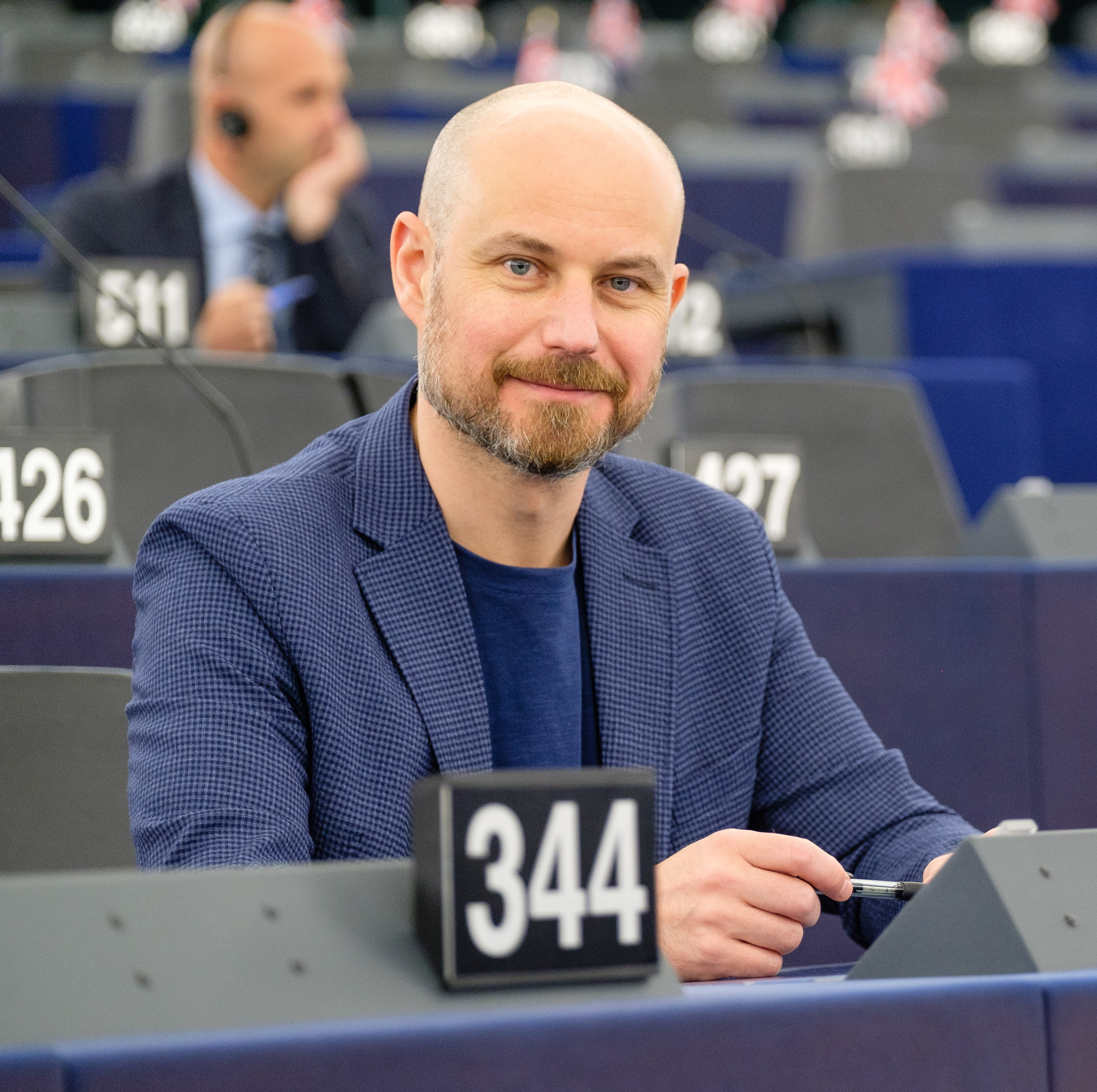

Member of the European Parliament for Slovakia
- In office 2 July 2019 – 15 July 2024
- Parliamentary group: European People´s Party

Personal details
- Born: 27 May 1975 (age 50) Bratislava, Czechoslovakia (now Slovakia)
- Party: Democrats (from 2019 to 2023)
- Children: 2
- Education: Swarthmore College (BA); St Antony's College, Oxford (MPhil); Comenius University (DPhil)
- Website: Official website
- Nickname: Mr. Serbia

Vladimír Bilčík (born 27 May 1975) is a Slovak university lecturer and politician of the Slovak party Democrats. He has served as a Member of the European Parliament from 2019 to 2024. During the 2019 European Parliament election in Slovakia, Bilčík ran as the leader of Democrats, as part of a coalition with Progressive Slovakia. He got 26,202 preferential votes in total.

== Political career ==
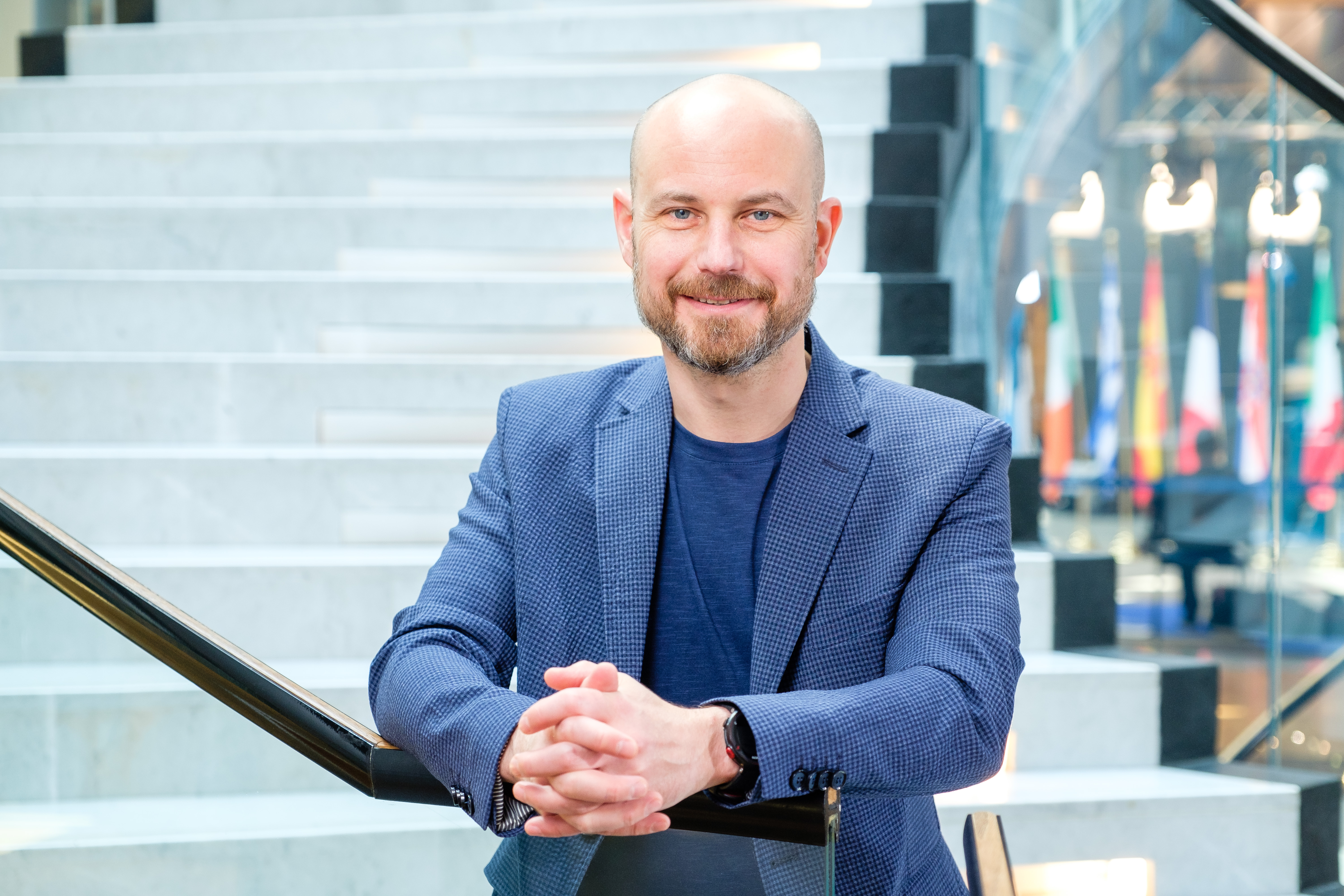
Vladimír Bilčík in the European Parliament

Bilčík has been a member of the Committee on Constitutional Affairs (AFCO), where he serves as his parliamentary group's coordinator; the Committee on Civil Liberties, Justice and Home Affairs (LIBE), within which he engages in the protection of the rule of law, the fight against misinformation, and the hybrid threats; and the Committee on Foreign Affairs (AFET), where he serves as the Parliament's rapporteur for relations with Serbia. Bilčík is part of the Democracy, Rule of Law & Fundamental Rights Monitoring Group.

In 2020, Bilčík joined the Special Committee on Foreign Interference in all Democratic Processes in the European Union.

Since 2021, Bilčík has been part of the Parliament's delegation to the Conference on the Future of Europe. He later negotiated a parliamentary resolution calling for the murderers of Maltese journalist Daphne Caruana Galizia to be brought to justice.

As the EPP shadow rapporteur, Bilčík works on the European Media Freedom Act - an important piece of legislation which aims to protect media pluralism and independence in the EU. Since 2023, he has been part of the Centre for European Policy Studies/Heinrich Böll Foundation High-Level Group on Bolstering EU Democracy, chaired by Kalypso Nicolaïdis.
