= Martin Hojsík =

Slovak politician

Martin Hojsík MEP
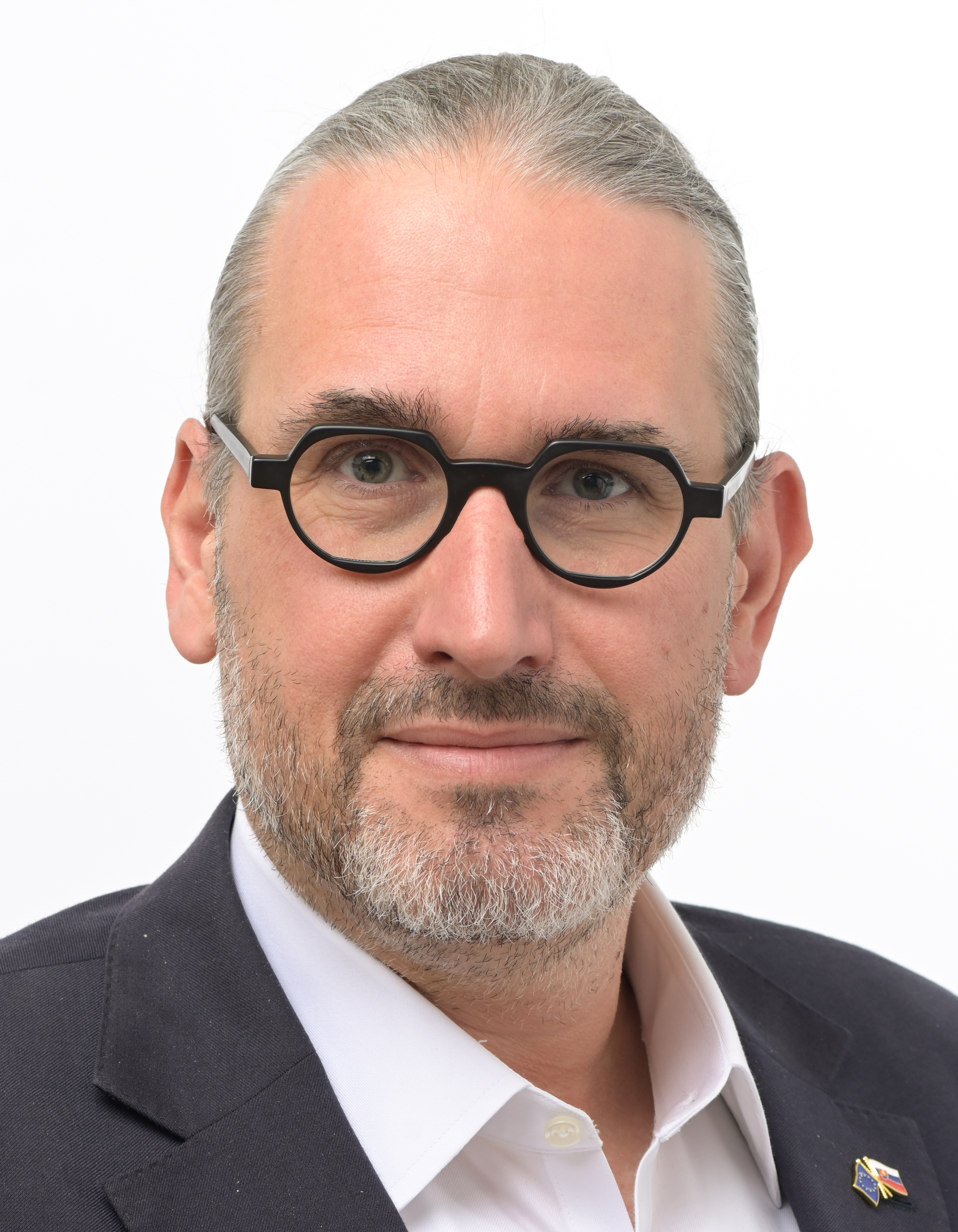
- Official portrait, 2024

Vice-President of the European Parliament
- Incumbent
- Assumed office 18 October 2023 Serving with See list
- President: Roberta Metsola
- Preceded by: Michal Šimečka

Member of the European Parliament for Slovakia
- Incumbent
- Assumed office 2 July 2019

Personal details
- Born: 27 January 1977 (age 49) Bratislava, Czechoslovakia
- Party: Progressive Slovakia
- Other political affiliations: Renew Europe
- Education: Comenius University

Martin Hojsík (born 27 January 1977) is a Slovak environmental activist and politician elected as a Member of the European Parliament in 2019. In addition to his committee assignments, Hojsík is a member of the European Parliament Intergroup on the Welfare and Conservation of Animals and a member of the political group Renew Europe. He is also a vice chairman of the political party Progressive Slovakia and their expert on environmental issues and sustainability.

In 2020, Hojsík appeared in the chart of American political opinion magazine Politico "20 MEPs to watch in 2020" and in the series of articles "Changemakers", where he was named as one of the MEPs, who will be the main leaders of positive changes in the fight against pesticides.

He was the chief program officer (CPO) and executive board member of the international charity FOUR PAWS. In the past, he worked on global campaigns for ActionAid International and Greenpeace International to change corporate behavior and public policies, and on communication campaigns for Greenpeace national offices

He studied genetics at the Faculty of Natural Science at Comenius University in Bratislava and has been an environmental and social movement activist since 1993.

== Background ==
Hojsík was born on 27 January 1977 in Bratislava, where he also grew up. He attended the Grammar School Vazovova. After graduation, he studied at Comenius University. During his career as an environmental expert, he has worked and lived in several countries, such as the Netherlands, South Africa, Thailand, and Austria.

In addition to Slovak, he speaks four other languages - Czech, Russian, English and German.

== Education and career ==
From 1995 to 2001, he studied genetics at the Faculty of Natural Science at Comenius University in Bratislava. In his master's thesis, he focused on the importance of selected chemomutagens for dedifferentiation, callogenesis, organogenesis and gene expression in groundnut (Arachis hypogaea L.). He holds a certificate from Schumacher College with a focus on leadership and teamwork.

=== Greenpeace ===
Hojsík has dedicated much of his life to Greenpeace, an international non-profit organization for environmental protection. He worked there for almost two decades, from 1995 to 2013. First, from 1995 to 1997, he held the position of an external project manager for energy efficiency at Greenpeace Czechoslovakia, where he was in charge of media communication, logistics and coordination of volunteers. After 2001, he worked for Greenpeace Central and Eastern Europe, where, among other things, he organized anti-toxin campaigns in Central and Eastern Europe and helped establish Greenpeace's regional headquarters in Poland and Hungary. Hojsík also worked on environmental policy issues, the implementation of the Aarhus Convention and the pollution of the Danube river.

From 2005 to 2009, he worked as an activist for Greenpeace International, dealing with cases such as illegal exports of electrical waste to Asia (China, India, Pakistan) and Africa (Ghana, Nigeria), as well as budget planning, management and training of volunteers. From 2009 to January 2013, he was in charge of managing the water management project for Greenpeace International based in the Netherlands. In this position, he created the multi-year strategy for the Greenpeace Detox campaign. In 2011 and 2012, he ran the Greenpeace Shop Window. He also worked at Greenpeace International as a campaign consultant and led training in this area.

==== ActionAid International ====
From 2013 to 2015, he worked at ActionAid International, based in Johannesburg. He developed and managed the Tax Power Multi Country Campaign, which was focused on promoting change in tax laws in developing countries. He coordinated communication with civic initiatives, trade unions, policy makers, and international institutions.

==== FOUR PAWS ====
Since 2015, he has been the chief programme officer and executive board member of FOUR PAWS, an animal rights organization that seeks to eliminate mistreatment of animals and animal cruelty. During his days in FOUR PAWS, Hojsík was responsible for the organization and implementation of program related strategies, projects, campaigns and their respective monitoring, evaluation and controlling. For example, he launched a campaign to help bears, which included the establishment of shelters for bears, which are often kept in inappropriate conditions despite the laws.

== Career in politics ==
Martin Hojsík has become politically involved in 2000 as a member of Small Grants committee at Slovak Ministry of Environment. In the years 2002 - 2006, he was a member of Advisory Committee to the Environment Committee of Slovak Parliament. As a member of National convent of SR on EU, in 2004 he coordinated a campaign aimed at toxic chemicals. In the years 2003 - 2004, as held a position of a member of National Coordination Committee of Initial assistance to the Slovak Republic to meet its obligations under the Stockholm Convention on Persistent Organic Pollutants (POPs). In 2015, he was a member of state delegation at the 3rd UN Conference on Financing for Development.

In 2016, he joined the board of OZ Progressive Slovakia, and since 2018, he has been a member of the political movement of the same name. In 2019, he ran for the European Parliament as a coalition candidate of the non-parliamentary movement Progressive Slovakia (PS) and the party of Civic Democracy (SPOLU) In 2020, he also joined the Committee of Inquiry on the Protection of Animals during Transport.

In 2021, Hojsík drafted a non-binding motion calling for a pan-European strategy to address soil conservation. This led to the passage of a 2025 law in the European Parliament setting a goal of healthy soil by 2050, obliging member countries to monitor their soils and address issues of soil contamination.
