= Katarína Roth Neveďalová =

Slovak politician

Katarína Roth Neveďalová MEP
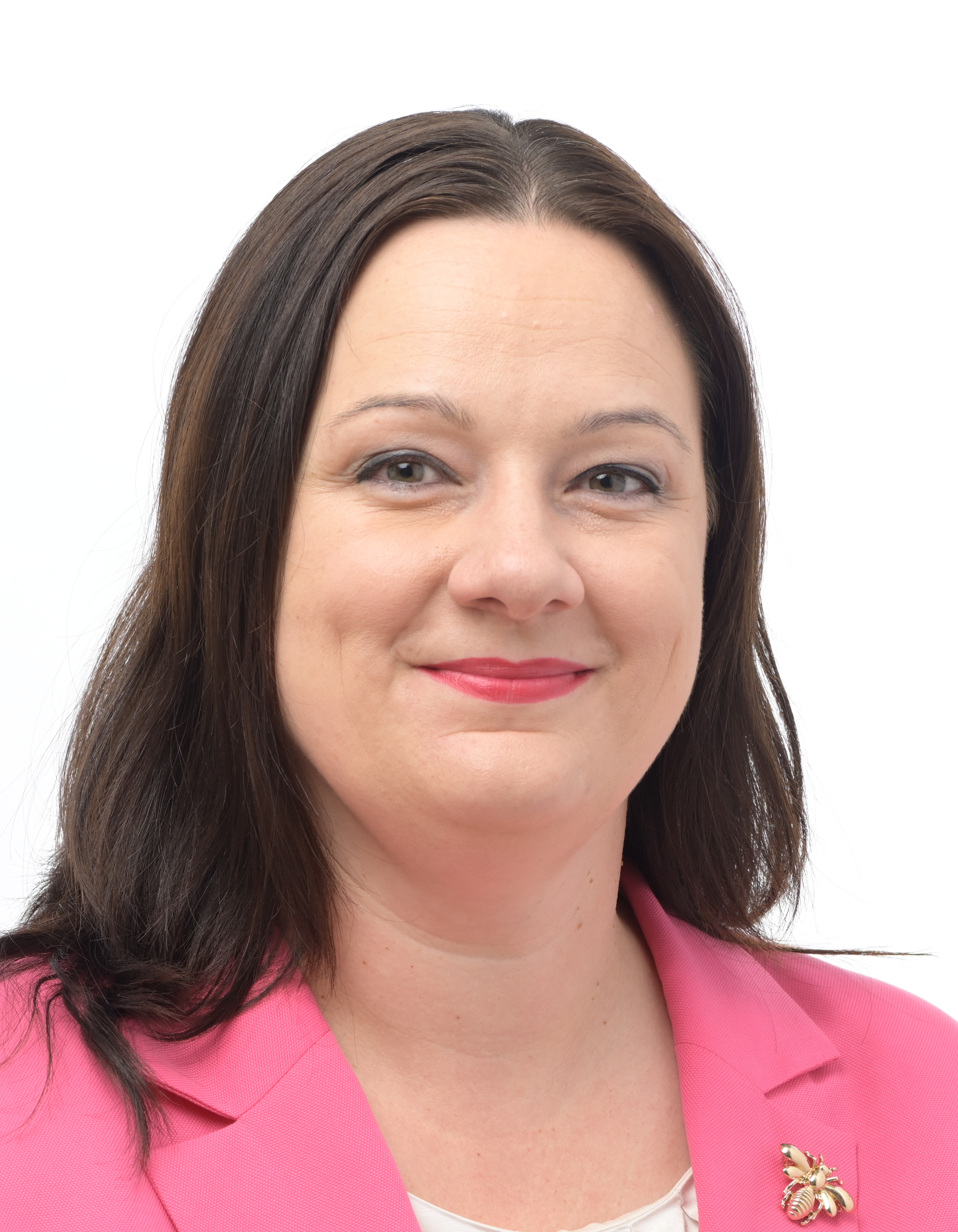
- Katarína Roth Neveďalová in 2024

Member of the European Parliament for Slovakia
- Incumbent
- Assumed office 30 December 2022
- Preceded by: Miroslav Číž
- In office 14 July 2009 – 1 July 2014

Personal details
- Born: 10 November 1982 (age 43) Nitra, Czechoslovakia (now Slovakia)
- Party: Direction – Social Democracy
- Website: Katarína Neveďalová MEP

Katarína Roth Neveďalová (born 10 November 1982) is a Slovak politician from Direction – Slovak Social Democracy.

Between 2009 and 2014 she was a Member of the European Parliament, where she was a member of the Progressive Alliance of Socialists and Democrats (S&D). She became vice-president of the Party of European Socialists in 2012.

She returned to the European Parliament in 2022 after the death of Miroslav Číž.

== Biography ==
Neveďalová was born in Nitra, Slovakia and grew up in Čeľadice.

She studied international relations and media communication and graduated from the Business Academy in Nitra.

Neveďalová is married.

== See also ==
- List of members of the European Parliament for Slovakia, 2019–2024
