= Slovak Green Party =

Slovak Green Party Strana zelených Slovenska
- Leader: Natália Hanulíková
- Founded: 2006
- Dissolved: 19 January 2022
- Split from: SZ
- Headquarters: Zimný štadión 638/43, Senica
- Membership (2019): ▼420
- Ideology: Green politics

Website
- www.stranazelenychslovenska.sk

The Slovak Green Party (Slovak: Strana zelených Slovenska, SZS), founded in 2006 was an environmentalist political party in Slovakia without parliamentary representation. It is not a member of the European Green Party.

== History ==
Until January 2006 the Slovak member of the European Green Party, had officially the name of Strana zelených na Slovensku (Green Party in Slovakia, SZS), before becoming Strana zelených (Green Party, SZ).

On 21 August 2006 a splinter group registered officially as Strana zelenej alternatívy (Green Party Alternatives, SZA), then changed its name on 26 September 2006 to the present Strana zelených Slovenska. It took part in the local elections in December 2006 in a coalition with the Slovak Democratic and Christian Union – Democratic Party and gained two seats in the municipal council in Senica.

The party did not take part in parliamentary elections until those of 2016 when its 42 candidates led by its leader the psychologist Natália Hanulíková (26 years old) got 17,541 votes (0.67%) and no seat.
