= Michal Wiezik =

Slovak politician

Michal Wiezik MEP
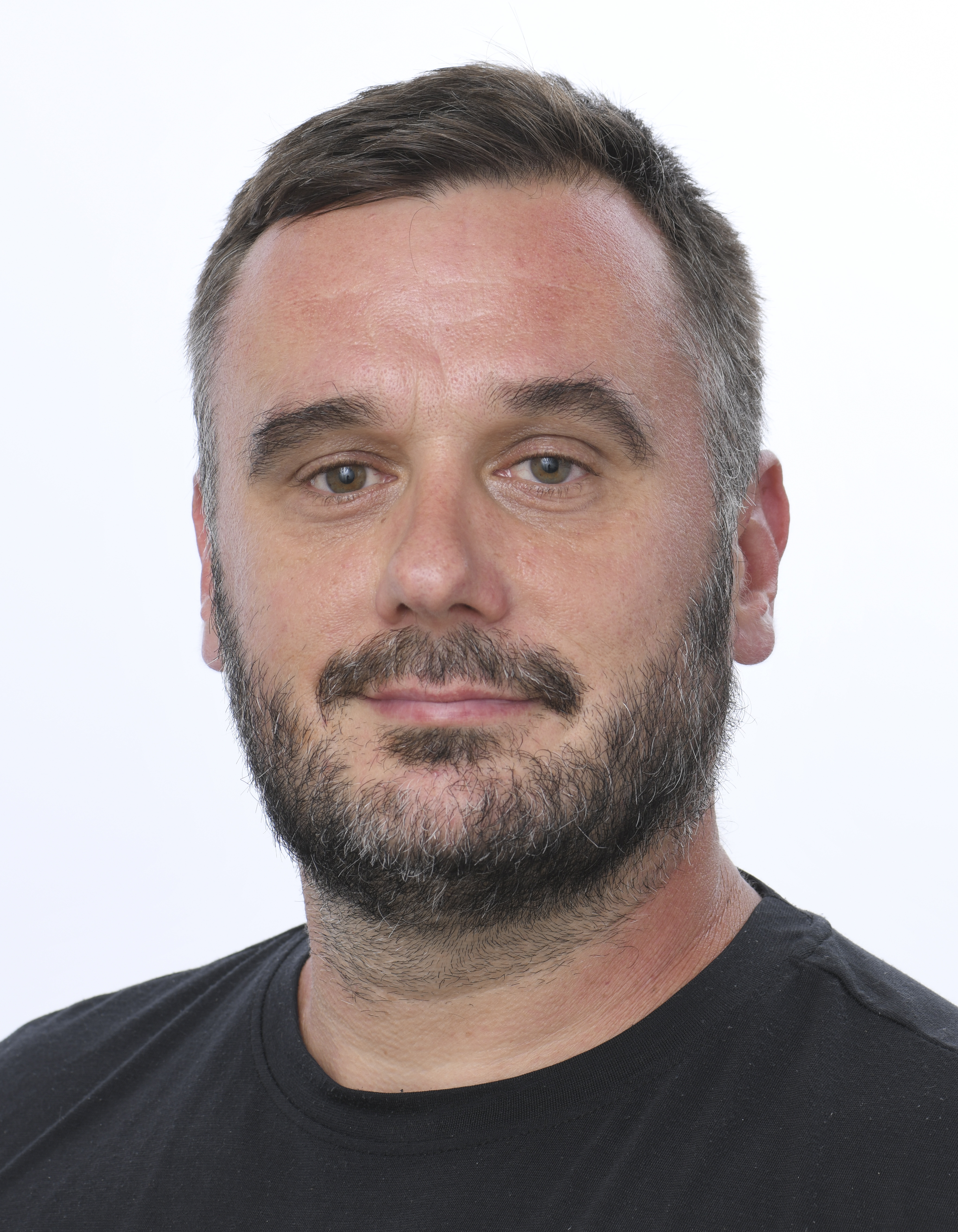
- Michal Wiezik in 2024

Member of the European Parliament for Slovakia
- Incumbent
- Assumed office 2 July 2019

Personal details
- Born: 14 June 1979 (age 46) Martin, Czechoslovakia
- Party: Progressive Slovakia (2021–present); Democrats (until 2021)
- Other political affiliations: Renew Europe (since 2021); Alliance of Liberals and Democrats for Europe (since 2021); European People's Party Group (2019–2021); European People's Party (2019–2021)
- Website: www.michalwiezik.sk

Michal Wiezik (born 14 June 1979) is a Slovak environmentalist and politician who was elected as a Member of the European Parliament in 2019.

== Early life and education ==
Born 14 June 1979 in Martin, Wiezik attended Viliam Paulíny Tóth grammar school and studied environmental protection at the Technical University in Zvolen. Following his studies, he obtained PhD. at the same university and became a professor there. In August 2023, he criticised the university for admitting a far right politician Miroslav Suja to its PhD program, despite Suja having no previous track record in environmental studies.

== Political career ==
Apart from his committee assignments, Wiezik is part of the European Parliament Intergroup on Climate Change, Biodiversity and Sustainable Development. He is also part of the European Parliament Intergroup on Seas, Rivers, Islands and Coastal Areas.

On 6 December 2021, Wiezik left Democrats to join Progressive Slovakia. He later left the European People's Party to join the Renew Europe group.

In the 2023 Slovak parliamentary election, Wiezik won the mandate but did not enter the National Council of Slovakia, thus remained in the European Parliament.

== Personal life ==
Wiezik lives in Zvolen.
