= Eugen Jurzyca =

Slovak economist and politician (born 1958)

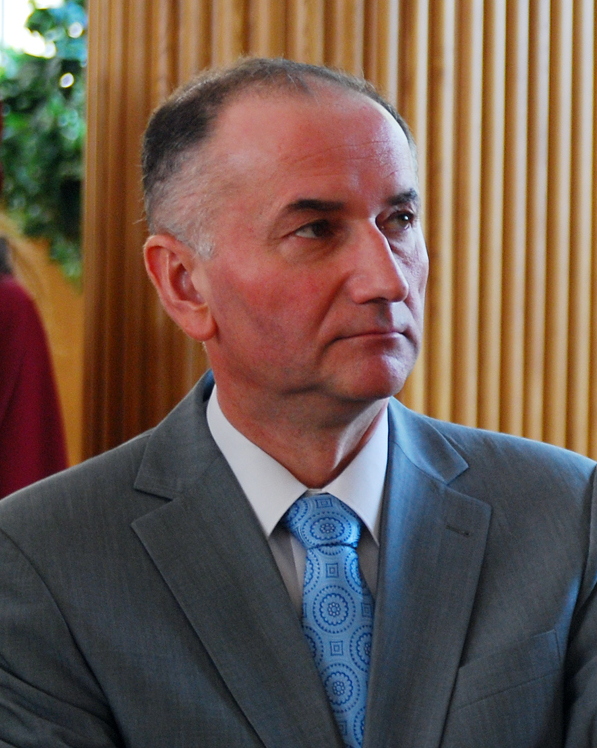
- Jurzyca in 2011

Member of the European Parliament for Slovakia
- In office 2 July 2019 – 15 July 2024

Member of the National Council of the Slovak Republic
- In office 1 July 2014 – 30 June 2019

Minister of Education of Slovakia
- In office 9 July 2010 – 4 April 2012
- Preceded by: Ján Mikolaj
- Succeeded by: Dušan Čaplovič

Personal details
- Born: February 8, 1958 (age 68) Bratislava, Czechoslovakia
- Party: SaS, European Conservatives and Reformists
- Education: University of Economics in Bratislava; Edmund A. Walsh School of Foreign Service

Eugen Jurzyca (born 8 February 1958) is a Slovak economist and a politician who has been a Member of the European Parliament (MEP) for Slovakia and has served as a Member of the Bureau of the European Conservatives and Reformists Group since July 2019. During the period of Iveta Radičová government (8 July 2010 – 4 April 2012) he served as the Minister of Education of Slovakia. After the 2014 European Parliament election in Slovakia, he replaced outgoing Member of the Parliament (MP) and became MP for Slovak Democratic and Christian Union – Democratic Party (SDKÚ-DS). In January 2015 he became a member of Freedom and Solidarity (SaS) and was re-elected as MP in 2016. Jurzyca is well-known for promoting public debt reduction, evidence-based policymaking and favorable business environment.

== Biography ==
At the turn of 1999 and 2000, he co-founded Slovak economic think-tank INEKO, Business Alliance of Slovakia (PAS) and Slovak branch of Transparency International. Later positions include Member of the Bank Board of the Slovak National Bank, Deputy Chairman of the Antimonopoly Office and a member of the Government Economic Council. He is the recipient of the highest state honor, Order of Ľudovít Štúr of the second class, awarded in 2005 by the President of Slovakia. He was a member of the panel at the Organisation for Economic Co-operation and Development in Kyiv, Ukraine and at the European Commission "Baltic Booster Conference". In 1996 and 1997, Jurzyca was a panel member at OECD seminars for competition in Almaty, Kazakhstan, Kyiv and Istanbul, Turkey.

== Personal life ==
Eugen Jurzyca is married with two children.

== See also ==
- Slovak politics
- Government of Slovakia
