= Ivan Štefanec =

Slovak politician

Ivan Štefanec MEP
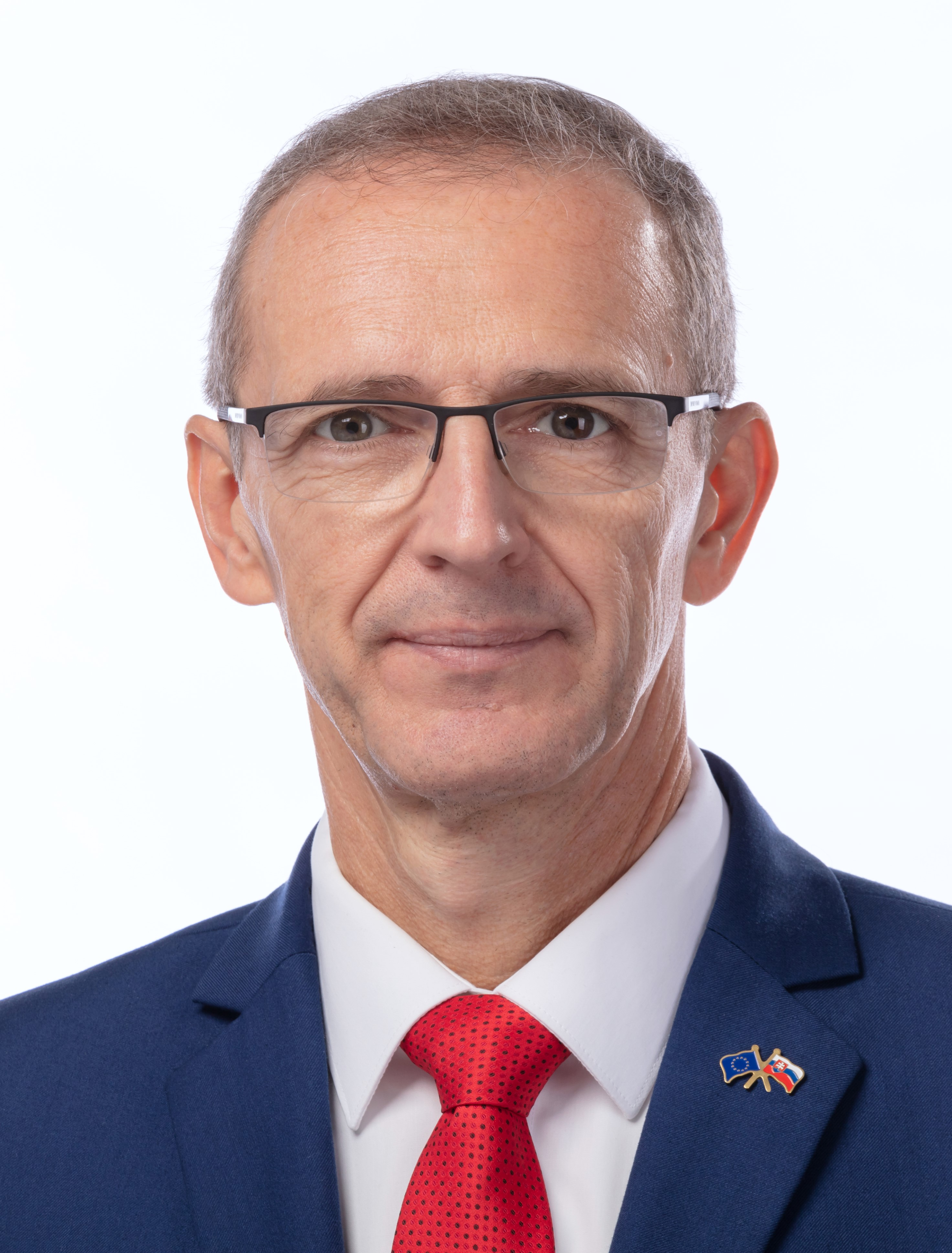
- Ivan Štefanec

Member of the European Parliament for Slovakia
- In office 2 July 2014 – 15 July 2024

Personal details
- Born: 30 September 1961 (age 65) Považská Bystrica, Czechoslovakia
- Party: KDH (2015–2025); European People's Party (EPP)
- Education: University of Economics in Bratislava
- Occupation: Politician
- Profession: Manager
- Website: ivanstefanec.sk

Ivan Štefanec (born 30 September 1961 in Považská Bystrica) is a Slovak politician and business manager, former member of the Slovak Parliament and current member of the European Parliament for Christian Democratic Movement.

== Early life and education ==
Štefanec was born in Považská Bystrica, Slovakia. After graduating from high school in 1979, he studied at the University of Economics in Bratislava studying Economic Mathematics from 1979 to 1983. Štefanec later supplemented his studies with a postgraduate English studies at Comenius University in Bratislava between 1987 and 1989. From 1991 until 1992, he became one of the first Czechoslovak students to use the opportunity to study abroad and graduated from Rochester Institute of Technology with the first MBA program for managers in Central and Eastern Europe. Among many reputable professors, Štefanec was taught by Douglas North who won the Nobel Prize in Economics in 1993. The following year in 1994, he finished his scientific postgraduate studies at the University of Economics in Bratislava, Faculty of Business and Informatics in Bratislava.

== Career ==
Štefanec started working as a researcher and later as a project manager at the engineering plant Považské Strojárne, Považská Bystrica in 1983. He worked of Ernst & Young CS Consulting from 1992 until 1993 and his professional career has been intertwined with the company Coca-Cola since 1994. Štefanec started as chief financial officer and deputy general manager and successfully ran the company Coca-Cola Beverages Slovakia as the general manager for five years. Under his leadership, Coca-Cola Beverages Slovakia was awarded with the National Quality Prize 2001.

Štefanec was appointed the EU integration manager of Coca-Cola HBC in Vienna in January 2003, which incorporated the preparation of the company for EU Enlargement in all accessible countries. He also served as president of the Business Alliance of Slovakia from its discovery in 2001 until 2005.

== Political career ==
=== Career in national politics ===
Štefanec was appointed European Commissioner by the Slovak Democratic and Christian Union in 2003. After the 2004 wind disaster in the High Tatra Mountains, he led the Government Committee for the recovery and development of the High Tatras. Štefanec was appointed as the Plenipotentiary for adoption of the Euro in Slovakia in 2005. He was a member of the Slovak National Council from 2006 until 2014, specifically focusing on Economic issues and European affairs. Štefanec was appointed the chairman of the Parliamentary Committee on European Affairs in 2018. On 19 February 2015, Štefanec left SDKÚ-DS and joined Christian Democratic Movement in 2015.

=== Member of the European Parliament (2014–2024) ===
At the 2014 European Parliamentary election, Štefanec was elected a member of the European Parliament for the SDKÚ-DS and subsequently joined the EPP Group. His priority topics were the Digital Single Market, SMEs, employment, and red tape reduction.

Štefanec served as a member of the Committee on the Internal Market and Consumer Protection, the Delegation for relations with Japan and a substitute in the Committee on Industry, Research, and Energy, the Delegation to the Euronest Parliamentary Assembly, the Delegation to the OACPS-EU Joint Parliamentary Assembly, the Delegation to the Africa-EU Parliamentary Assembly, the Delegation to the EU-Ukraine Parliamentary Association Committee, and the Subcommittee on Human Rights. From 2016 until 2017, Štefanec was a member of the temporary Committee of Inquiry into Emission Measurements in the Automotive Sector and from 2020 until 2022 was a member of the temporary Committee on Artificial Intelligence in a Digital Age.

In addition, Štefanec held the position of the President of SME Europe and is the European Investment Fund Programming Committee Co-chair. He was also a member of the European Internet Forum; the European Parliament Intergroup on Integrity (Transparency, Anti-Corruption and Organized Crime); and the European Parliament Intergroup on Disability.

In his first term, Štefanec was a member of the Committee on the Internal Market and Consumer Protection, the Delegation for relations with the countries of South Asia, and the Committee of Inquiry into Emission Measurements in the Automotive Sector. He served as a substitute for the Committee on Budgets, the Delegation to the EU-Ukraine Parliamentary Association Committee, the Delegation to the Euronest Parliamentary Assembly, the Subcommittee on Human Rights, the Committee of Inquiry to investigate alleged contraventions and maladministration in the application of Union law in relation to money laundering, tax avoidance, and tax evasion, and the Special Committee on financial crimes, tax evasion, and tax avoidance.

== Awards ==
- 2003 – Dale Carnegie Leadership Award
- 2011 – Taiwanese Friendship Medal of Diplomacy
