= Peter Pollák =

Slovak politician

Peter Pollák MEP
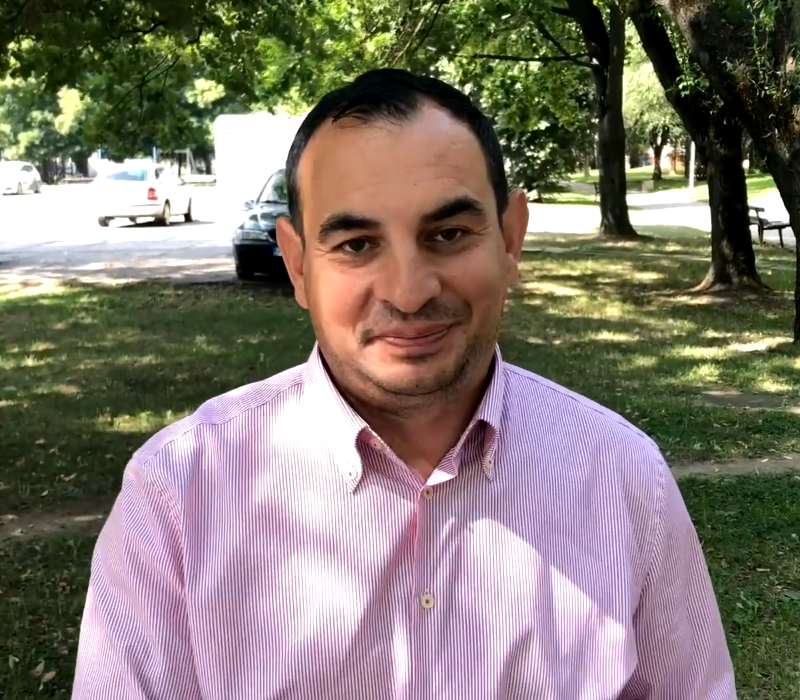
- Pollák in 2019

Member of the European Parliament for Slovakia
- In office 2 July 2019 – 15 July 2024

Member of the National Council
- In office 4 April 2012 – 23 March 2016

Personal details
- Born: 20 April 1973 (age 53) Levoča, Czechoslovakia
- Party: OĽaNO
- Education: Catholic University in Ružomberok
- Website: peterpollak.sk

Peter Pollák (born 20 April 1973) is a Slovak politician who has served as a Member of the European Parliament.

== Early life and education ==
Born 20 April 1973 in Levoča, Pollák is of Romani origin. His father worked as an excavator in the Czech Republic whilst his mother was a cleaner in a kindergarten. Pollák has four siblings, three of whom are educated although his brothers did not obtain a diploma.

== Political career ==
During the 2012 Slovak parliamentary election, Pollák ran in the eighth place of the OĽaNO candidates and finished 14th by winning 6072 preferential votes. He became the first member of Romani origin. Pollák also works as a member of the Permanent Delegation of the Slovak Republic to the OSCE Parliamentary Assembly.
