= Zuzana Čaputová =

President of Slovakia from 2019 to 2024

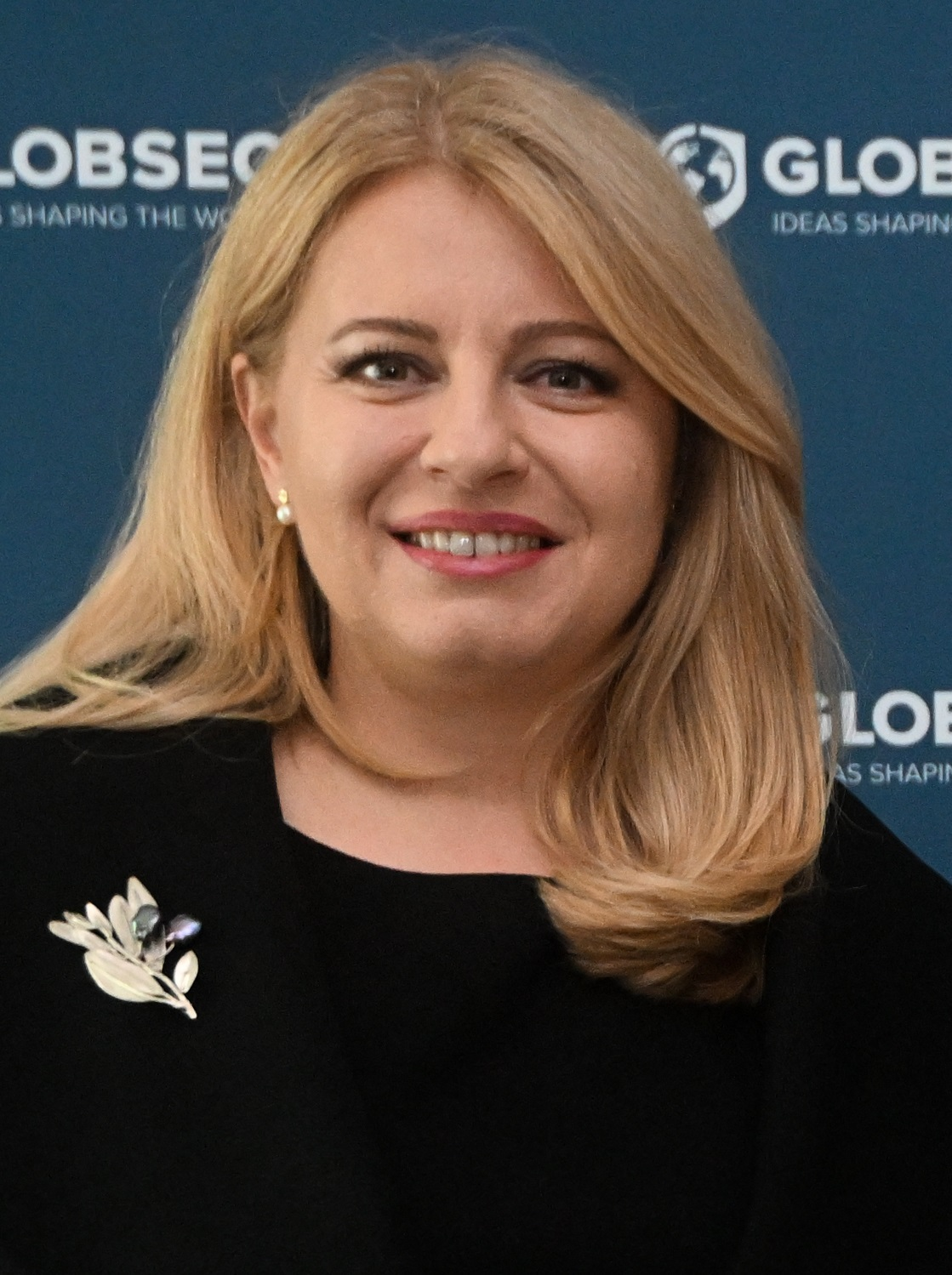
- Čaputová in 2023

5th President of Slovakia
- In office 15 June 2019 – 15 June 2024
- Prime Minister: Peter Pellegrini; Igor Matovič; Eduard Heger; Ľudovít Ódor; Robert Fico
- Preceded by: Andrej Kiska
- Succeeded by: Peter Pellegrini

Personal details
- Born: Zuzana Strapáková; 21 June 1973 (age 53) Bratislava, Czechoslovakia
- Party: Progressive Slovakia (2017–2019)
- Spouse: Ivan Čaputa (divorced)
- Domestic partner: Juraj Rizman (2020–2026)
- Children: 2 daughters
- Education: Comenius University (Mgr.)

Zuzana Čaputová (Note: Slovak pronunciation: [ˈzuzana ˈtʂaputɔʋaː]) (née Strapáková; born 21 June 1973) is a Slovak politician, lawyer, and environmental activist who served as the fifth president of Slovakia from 2019 to 2024. Čaputová is the first woman to hold the presidency, as well as the youngest president in the history of Slovakia, elected at the age of 45.

Čaputová first became known by prevailing in a decade-long struggle against the situating of a toxic landfill in her hometown of Pezinok. For this, Čaputová was awarded the 2016 Goldman Environmental Prize. She won the 2019 Slovak presidential election with 58% of the vote in the run-off. She did not seek re-election in the 2024 Slovak presidential election.

== Early life and education ==
Čaputová was born into a working-class family in Bratislava. She grew up in the nearby town of Pezinok, in what was Czechoslovakia for the first two decades of her life. Čaputová described her upbringing as having occurred within "an open-minded house". Čaputová studied at the Comenius University Faculty of Law in Bratislava, graduating in 1996. Between 1998 and 1999 she completed the training cycle "General Management – Management of Change" and in 1999 the ARK – Mediation course, accredited by the Ministry of Education of Slovakia.

== Early career ==
After concluding her education, Čaputová worked in the local government of Pezinok, first as an assistant in the legal department, and later as a deputy to the town mayor. She later moved into the non-profit sector at the Open Society Foundations, where she handled public administration and the issue of abused and exploited children. Subsequently, she worked as a project manager at the civic association EQ Klub on local community development.

Between 2001 and 2017, Čaputová worked with Via Iuris, a civic organization, as a lawyer (since 2010), and with Greenpeace on campaign planning. In Pezinok, for more than ten years, she was at the forefront of a public campaign against the authorization of another landfill that would aggravate pollution of the soil, air, and water in the city and its surrounding areas. The fight against the landfill culminated in 2013, when the Supreme Court of Slovakia ruled that the new landfill was illegal and violated environmental norms. Čaputová has run her own law firm and authored and co-authored several publications. She is a fellow of the Environmental Law Alliance Worldwide (ELAW), a network of environmental lawyers and jurists.

== Political activities ==
As a co-founding member of Progressive Slovakia, a non-parliamentary liberal party, Čaputová served as its deputy chair until March 2019, after which she resigned due to her presidential candidacy. Čaputová was the party's candidate in the 2019 Slovak presidential election and proceeded to be elected president in the second round, after receiving over 58% of the vote and beating her opponent Vice President of the European Commission Maroš Šefčovič, an independent who was supported by the long-dominant Smer–SD party.

== Presidency ==
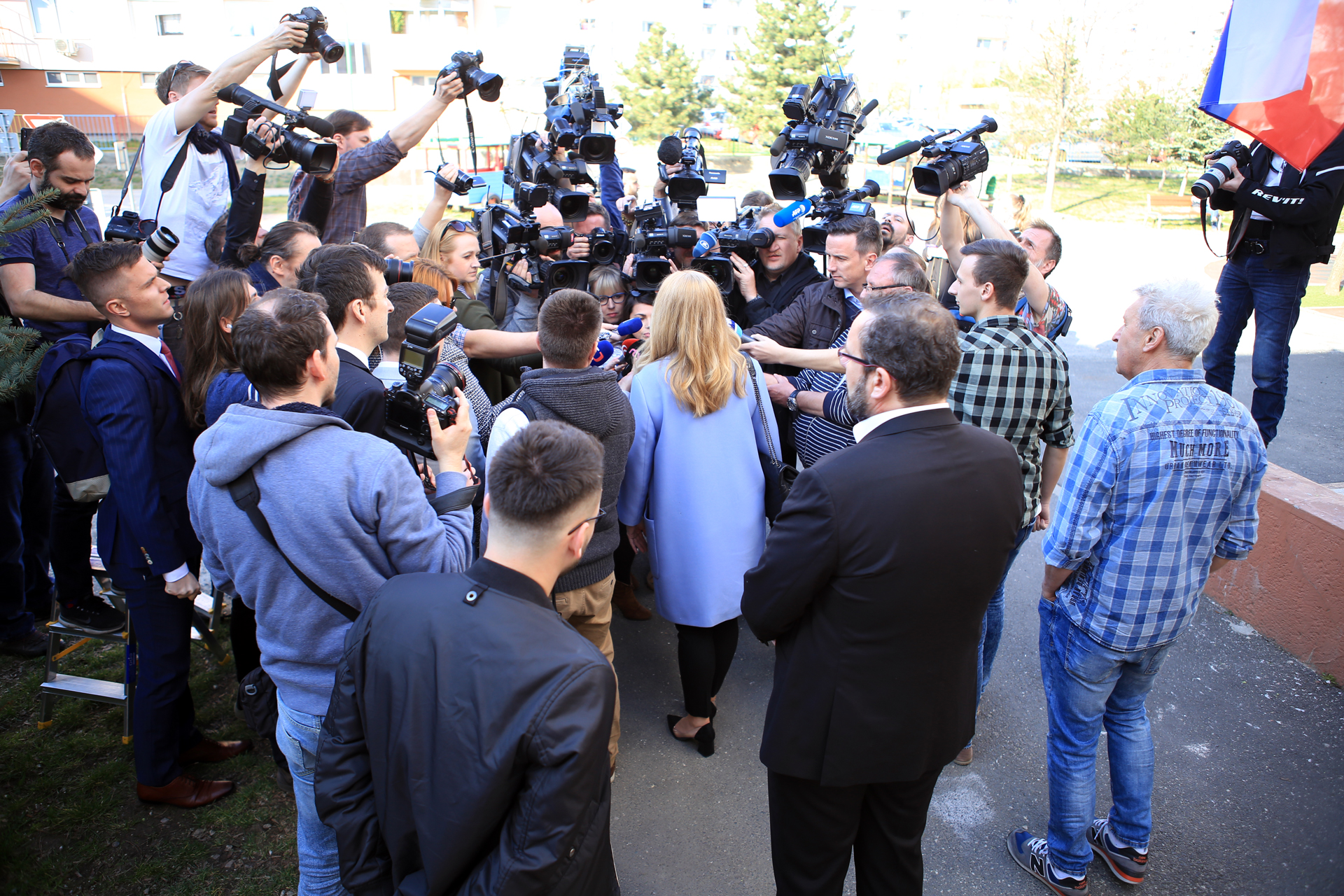
Čaputová speaking to reporters during presidential campaign, 2019

In a press conference held on 29 March 2018, Čaputová announced her bid for the Slovak presidency in the 2019 presidential race as the candidate of Progressive Slovakia. Robert Mistrík, another strong contender, withdrew from the race and endorsed her on 26 February 2019. She said she had felt compelled to run for the Presidency after the murder of Ján Kuciak, an investigative journalist.

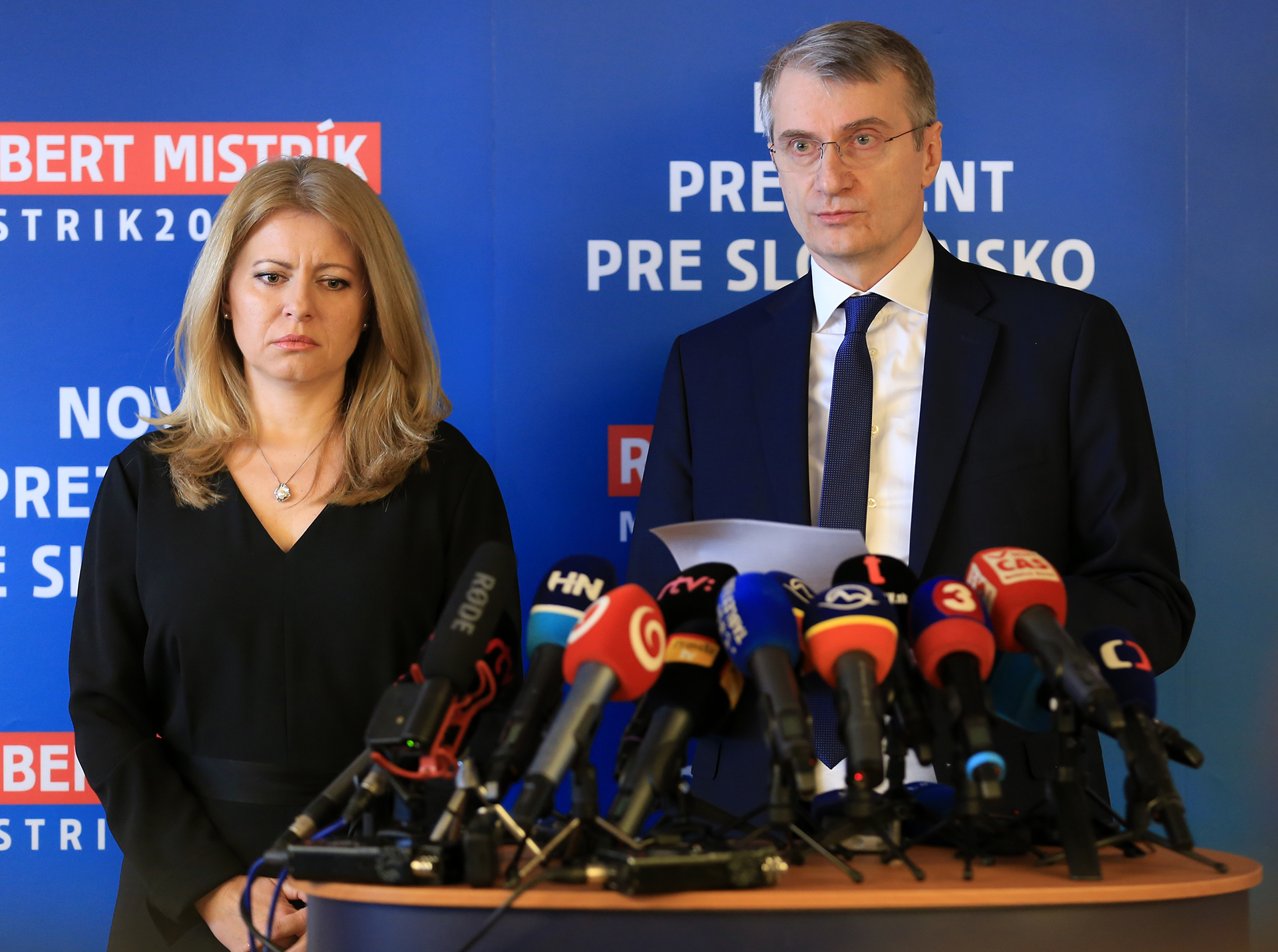
Čaputová and Robert Mistrík, initially a front-runner who withdrew from the race and endorsed her

Čaputová won the first round of the election on 16 March 2019, with 40.57% of the vote. She then defeated her second-place opponent, Maroš Šefčovič, by around 58% to 42% in the second run-off round on 30 March 2019. The second-round turnout of just 41.79% was the lowest for any round of voting in that type of election in Slovakia. The number of votes with which Čaputová was elected to office was also the lowest for any directly elected Slovak president to date. Her presidential inauguration took place on 15 June 2019 during a special session of the National Council in Bratislava.

She was rated as the most trusted politician in the country in both 2020 and 2021, with 83% and 58% of citizens polled saying they saw her as trustworthy, respectively. A December 2019 poll in the neighboring Czech Republic showed that she had a higher approval rating there (54% approval, 18% disapproval) than incumbent President Miloš Zeman (46% approval, 50% disapproval).

A poll in late May 2022 reported that 15% of voters would "certainly" vote for her, with additional 34% considering a vote for her in the 2024 Slovak presidential election. In 2023, Čaputová was mentioned as a possible candidate to replace NATO Secretary-General Jens Stoltenberg following his expected retirement that same year. On 20 June 2023, Čaputová announced that she would not run for re-election, citing the stress created by four major crises during her term: the COVID-19 pandemic, Russia's war in Ukraine, the energy crisis, and soaring inflation. Her decision was commented on by Czech President Petr Pavel with regret and her predecessor Andrej Kiska with sadness. Similar positions were expressed by centre-right and former coalition parties. Opposition headed by SMER-SSD, HLAS-SD, and SNS welcomed her decision.

== Political positions ==
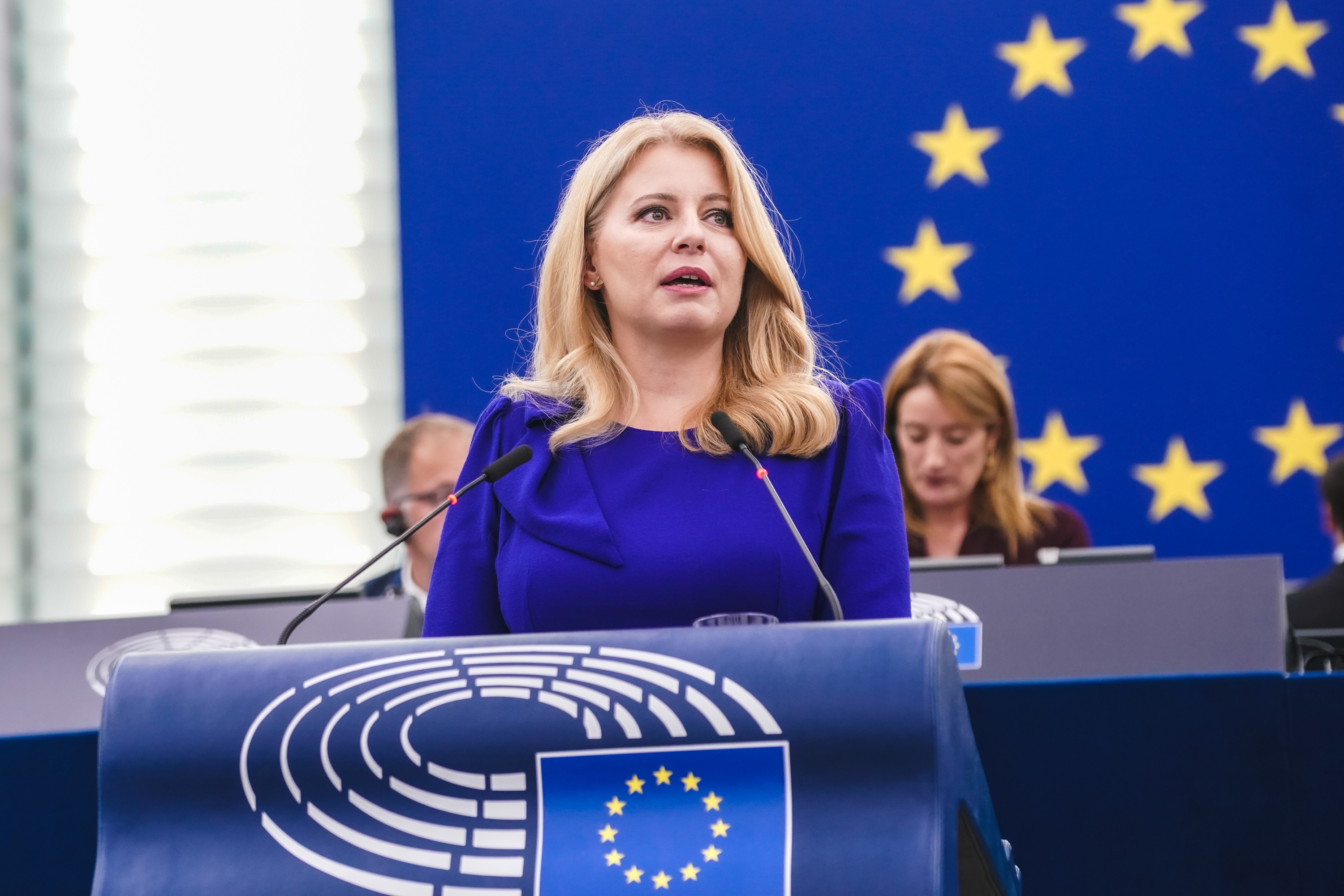
Čaputová speaks to the European Parliament in 2022

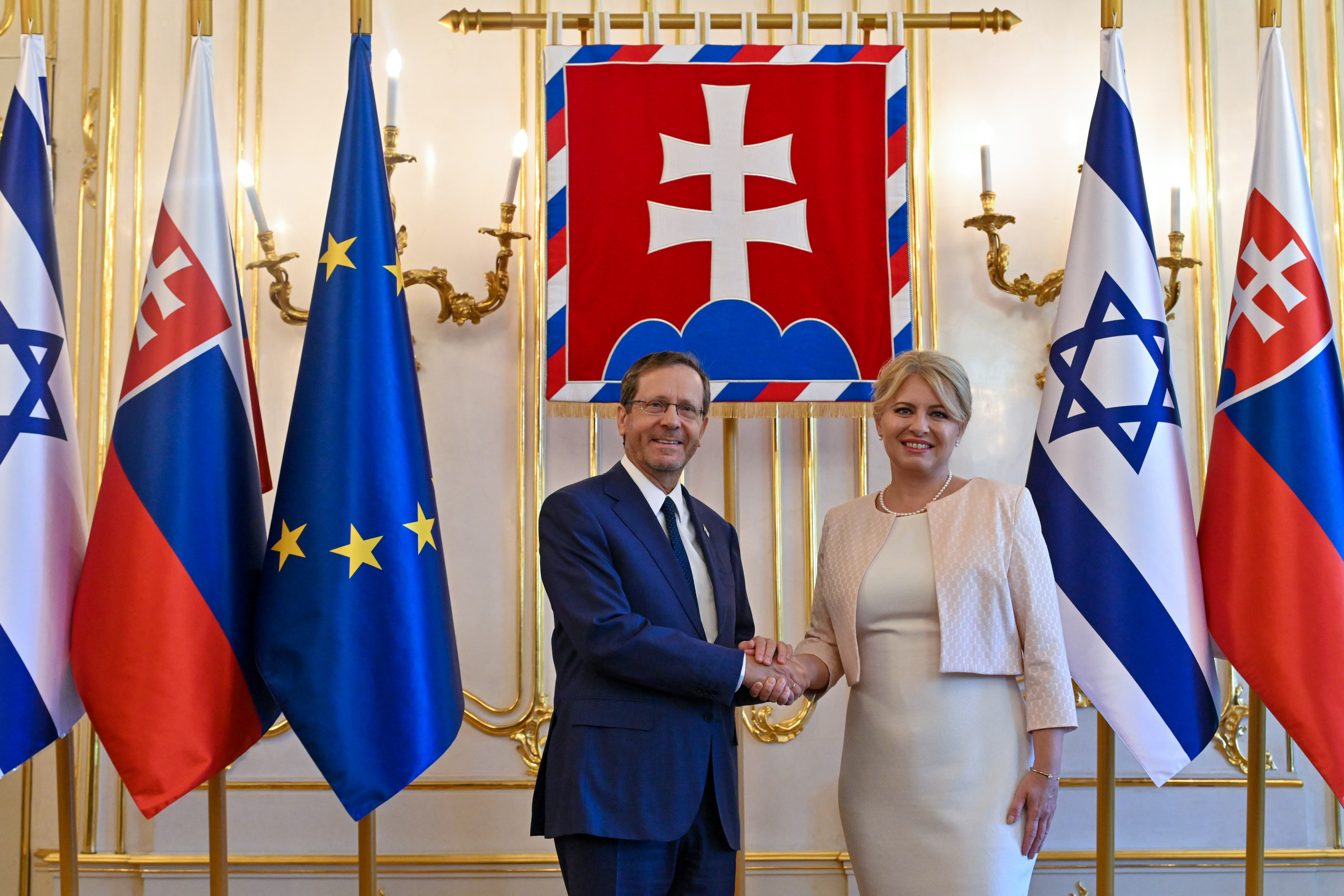
Čaputová with Israeli President Isaac Herzog in the Grassalkovich Palace, 2023

=== Equality ===
On her campaign website, Čaputová says that "justice in Slovakia does not always apply equally to everyone". In keeping with her statements during the campaign, she plans to introduce changes to Slovakia's police and judicial system. She campaigned for the police force to be an independent institution without political influence, headed by an impartial professional with proven service. She further claims that it is necessary to transform the prosecutor's office into a publicly managed institution.

=== Environment ===
Čaputová is an environmental campaigner who has been compared to American activist Erin Brockovich. Climate change mitigation is one of her highest priorities, and for that reason she is ending subsidies for coal and other fossil fuels. Čaputová has promised to phase out coal mining and power generation by 2023, and brought her nation into the Powering Past Coal Alliance. Čaputová holds that environmental protection should include stopping illegal deforestation and that 5% of the most environmentally valuable territory should remain as a strictly protected zone.

=== LGBT rights ===
Čaputová has stated that she supports registered partnerships for same-sex couples, and educating the general public on these relationships. In a discussion organized by Sme, she lectured on the possibility of adoption by gay couples: "I prefer the child to have a biological mother and a biological father. If he were to grow up in institutional care, I think he'd be better off with two loving beings, even if they were of the same sex."

=== Abortion and reproductive rights ===
Čaputová supports maintaining the status quo regarding abortion and reproductive rights, saying: "If there is an extreme situation and the dilemma is between deciding whether to adopt a legal norm that will intrude upon the personal lives of citizens or leave it to women's responsibility and their personal choice, I choose the responsibility of a woman."

== Personal life ==
Čaputová is divorced and has two daughters. She practices Zen yoga. Čaputová continued to reside in Pezinok during her presidency.

== Awards and recognition ==
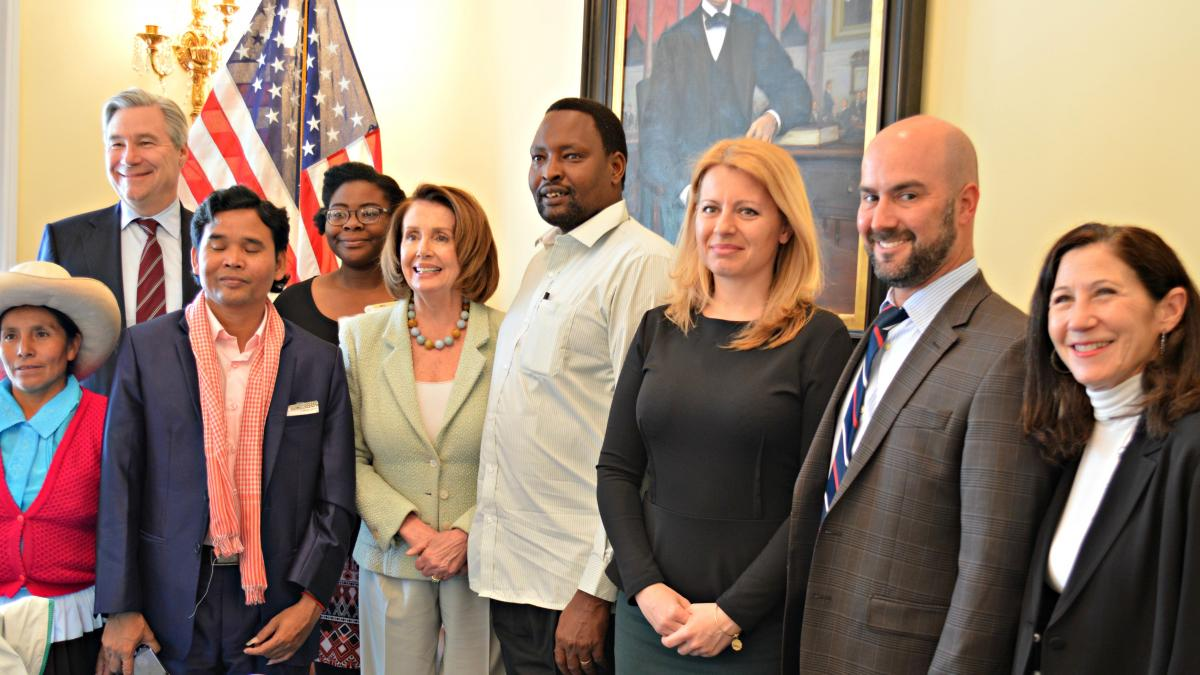
Čaputová (third from the right) with the other 2016 winners of the Goldman Prize, along with U.S. politician Nancy Pelosi.

For her strong and resolute leadership regarding the Pezinok landfill affair, Čaputová was awarded the Goldman Environmental Prize in 2016. Laureates of this prize are selected by an international jury and experts from around the world who have distinguished themselves for having a lasting and significant impact on environmental protection. The Goldman award was delivered to Čaputová in San Francisco. Her long and eventually triumphant struggle has been compared to that of the American Erin Brockovich. The text of the prize states that she was awarded for her "relentless campaigning against the opening of a landfill in the town of Pezinok, which, if opened, would further aggravate potential health hazards and would contribute to urban pollution". In recognition of her efforts for the European democracy, Čaputová was awarded the European Prize for Political Culture in August 2019. In 2023, she was awarded the Kaiser Otto Prize.

In 2023, she was ranked 84th in Forbes' list of the World's 100 Most Powerful Women. Čaputová was also recognized as one of the 100 Influential Women in Oncology by OncoDaily.

== Honours ==
=== National honours ===
- Slovakia: Order of Andrej Hlinka
- Slovakia: Order of Ľudovít Štúr
- Slovakia: Milan Rastislav Štefánik Cross
- Slovakia: Pribina Cross

=== Foreign honours ===
- Greece: Grand Cross of the Order of the Redeemer (6 September 2022)
- Netherlands: Grand Cross of the Order of the Netherlands Lion (7 March 2023)
- Ukraine: Order of Prince Yaroslav the Wise (9 March 2024)
- Poland: Recipient of the Order of the White Eagle (16 April 2024)
- Austria: Grand Star of the Decoration of Honour for Services to the Republic of Austria (29 May 2024)
- Czech Republic: Grand Cross with Collar of the Order of the White Lion (12 June 2024)

== Photo Gallery ==
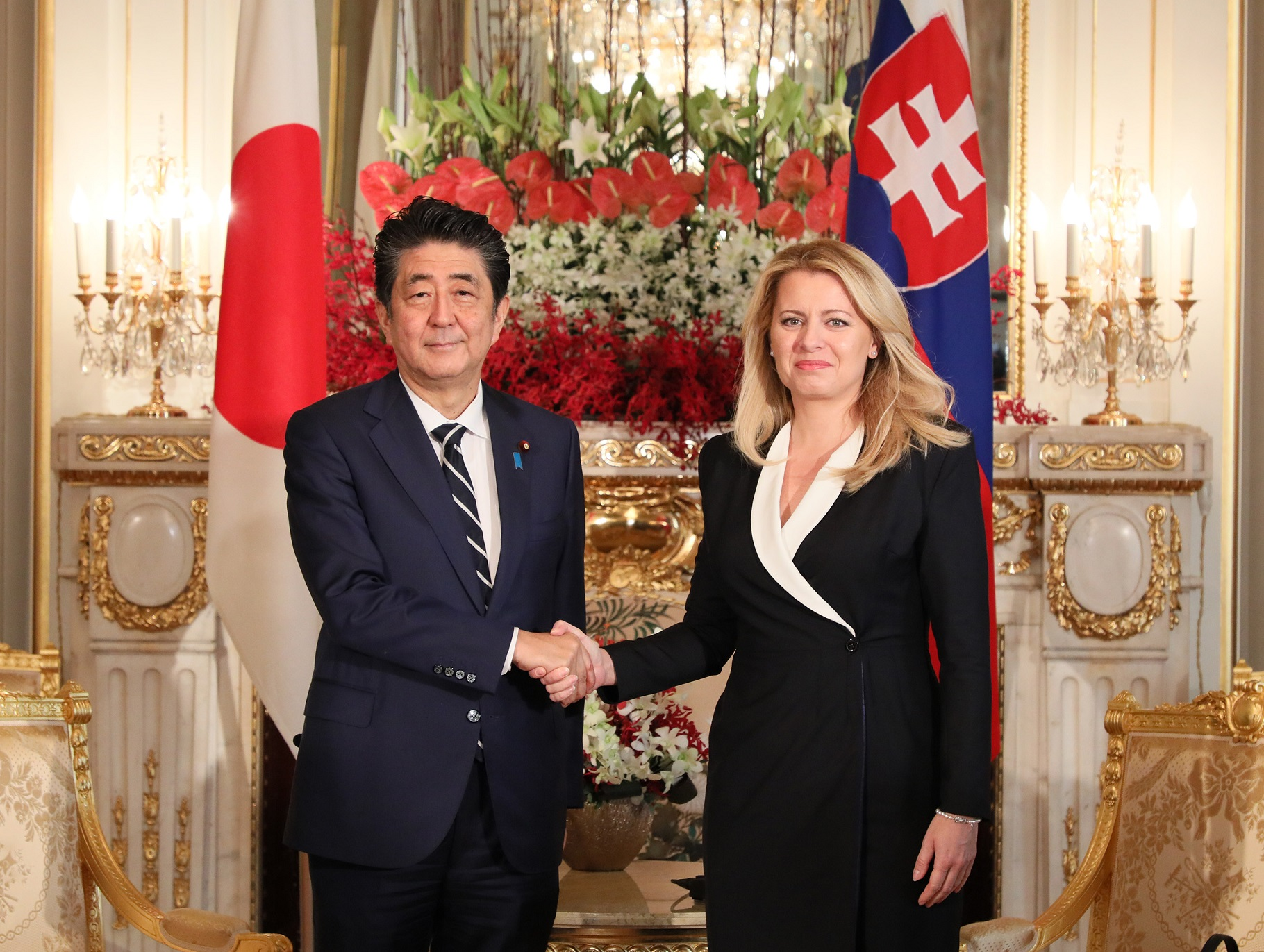
Čaputová with Japanese Prime Minister Shinzo Abe at the Akasaka Palace, Tokyo, 2019

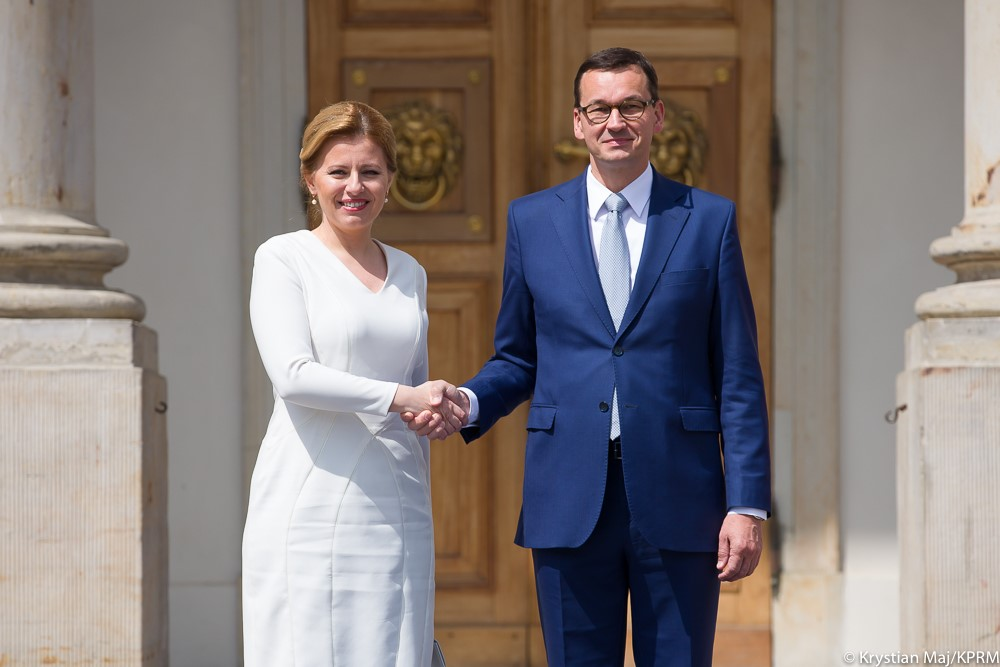
Čaputová with Polish Prime Minister Mateusz Morawiecki, in Warsaw on 15 July 2019

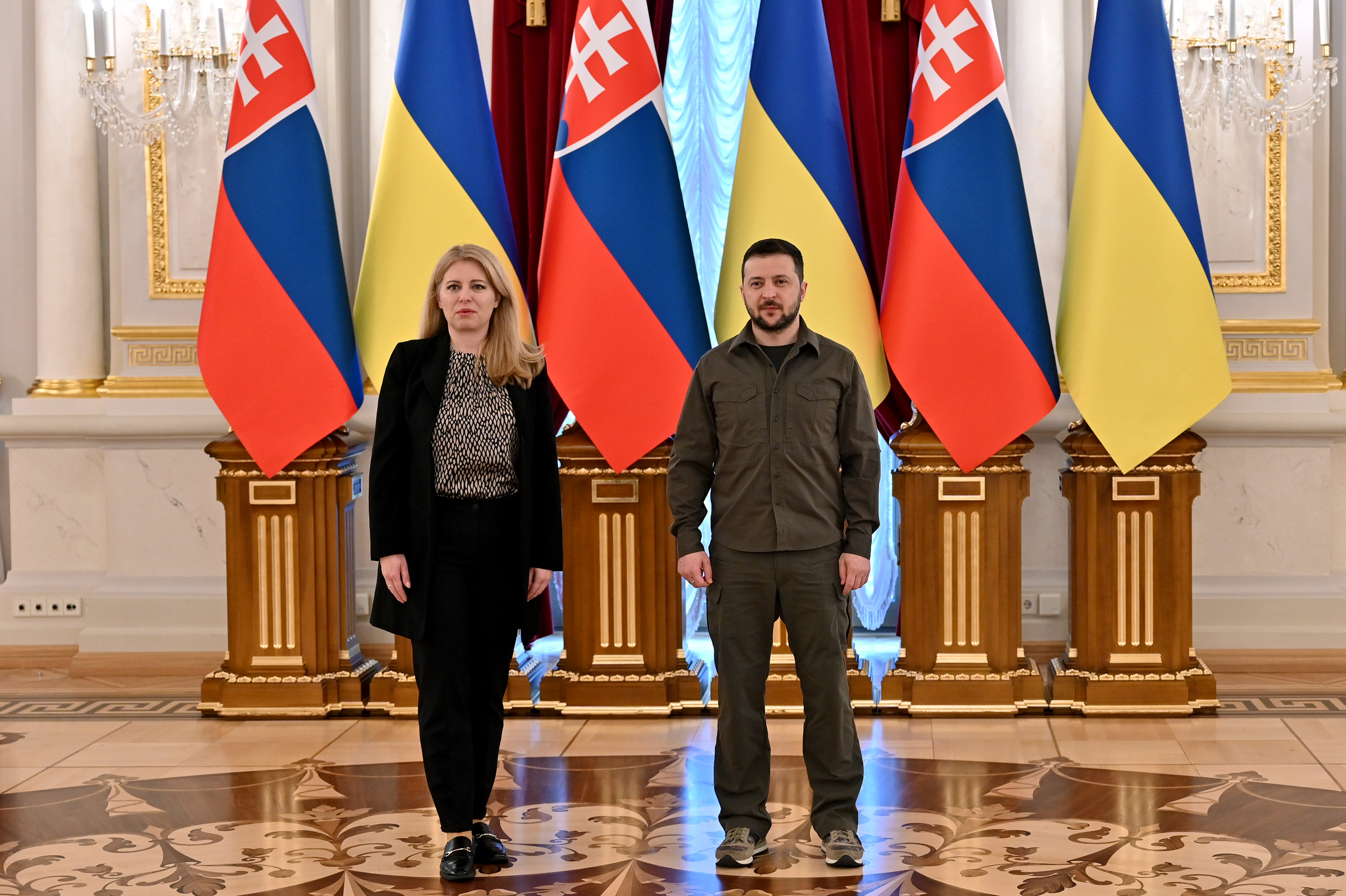
Čaputová with Ukrainian President Volodymyr Zelenskyy, in Kyiv on 31 May 2022

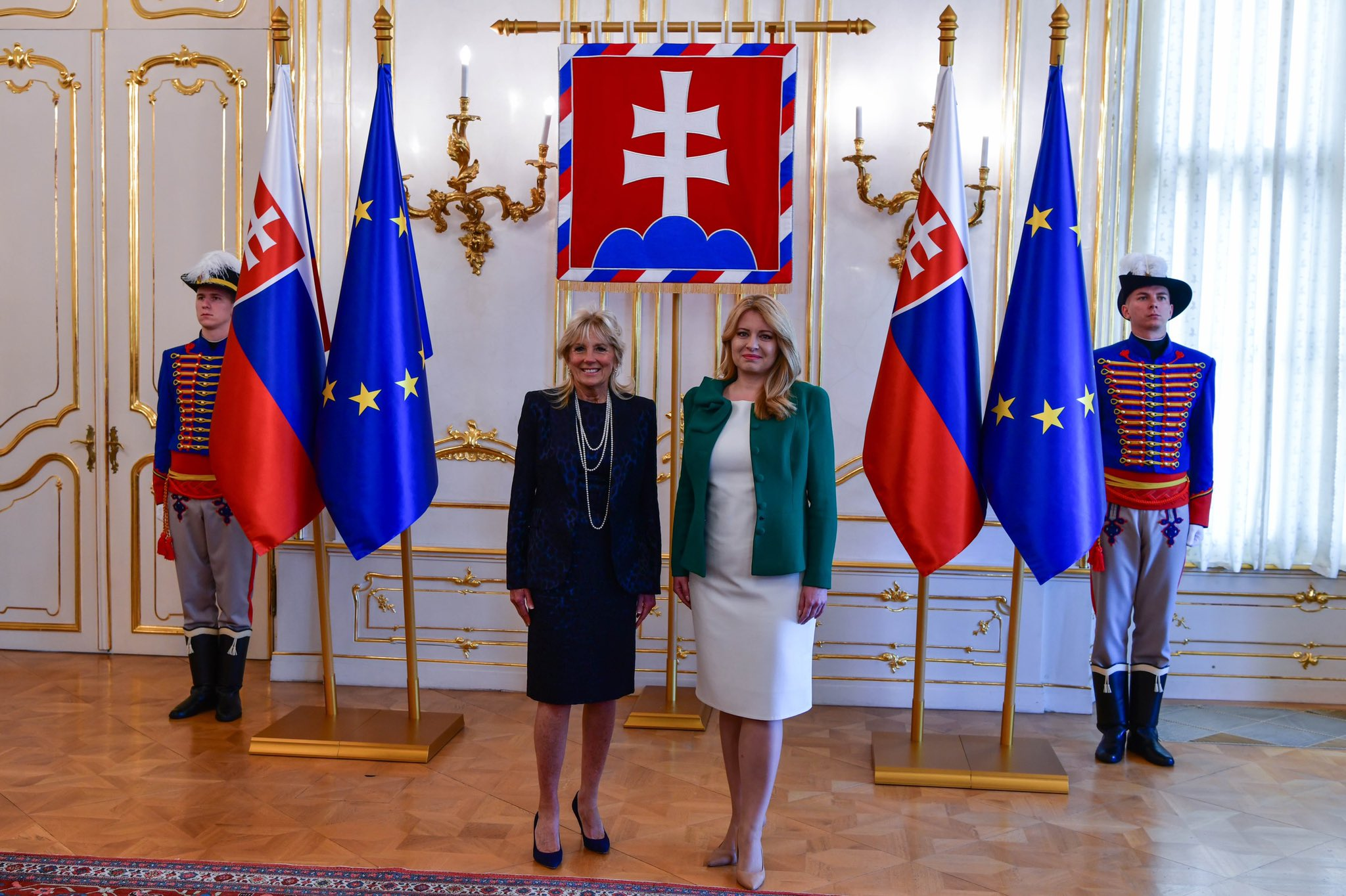
Čaputová with the first lady of the United States Jill Biden in the Grassalkovich Palace, 2022

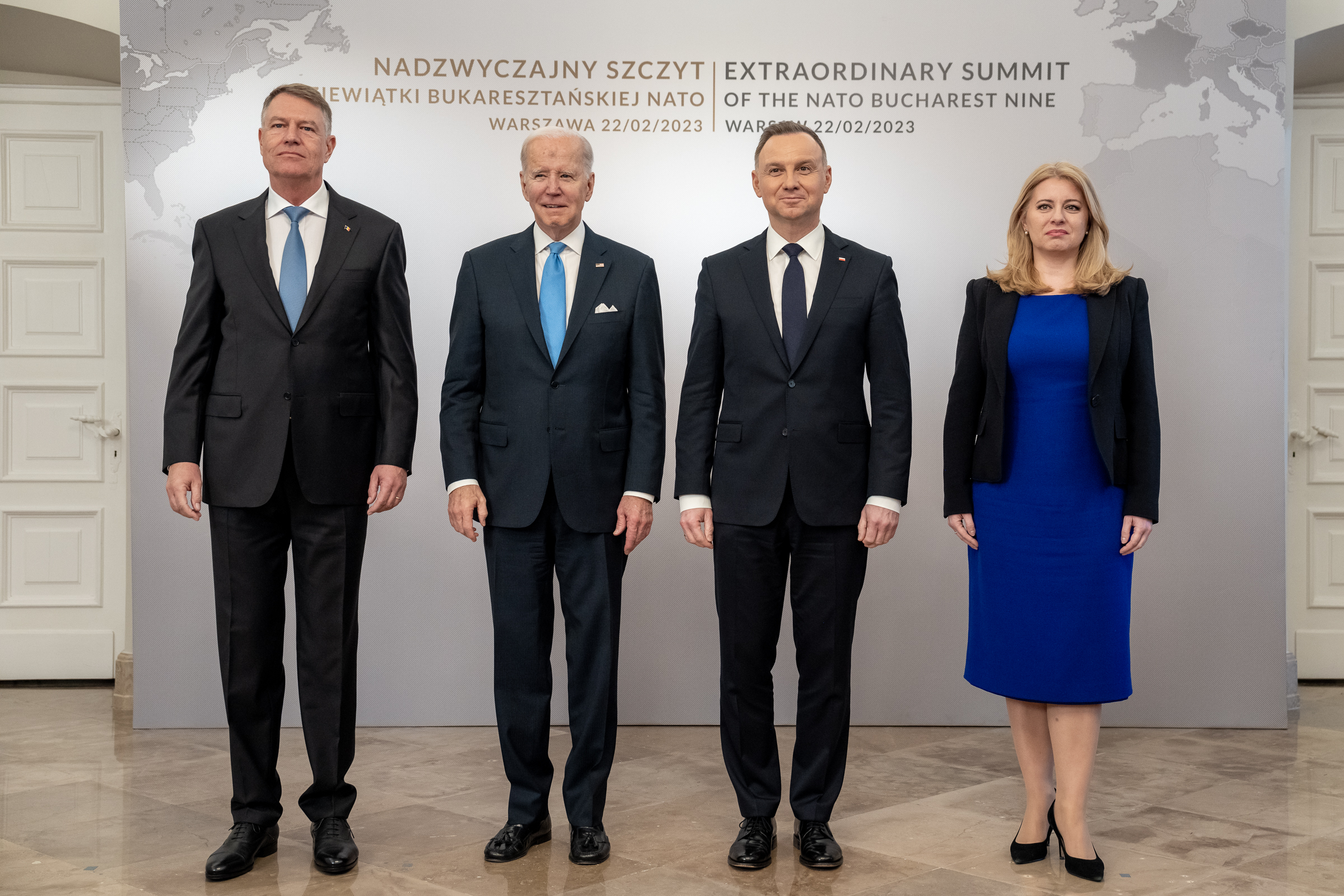
Čaputová with U.S. President Joe Biden, Romanian President Klaus Iohannis and Polish President Andrzej Duda at the Bucharest Nine summit in Warsaw, 2023

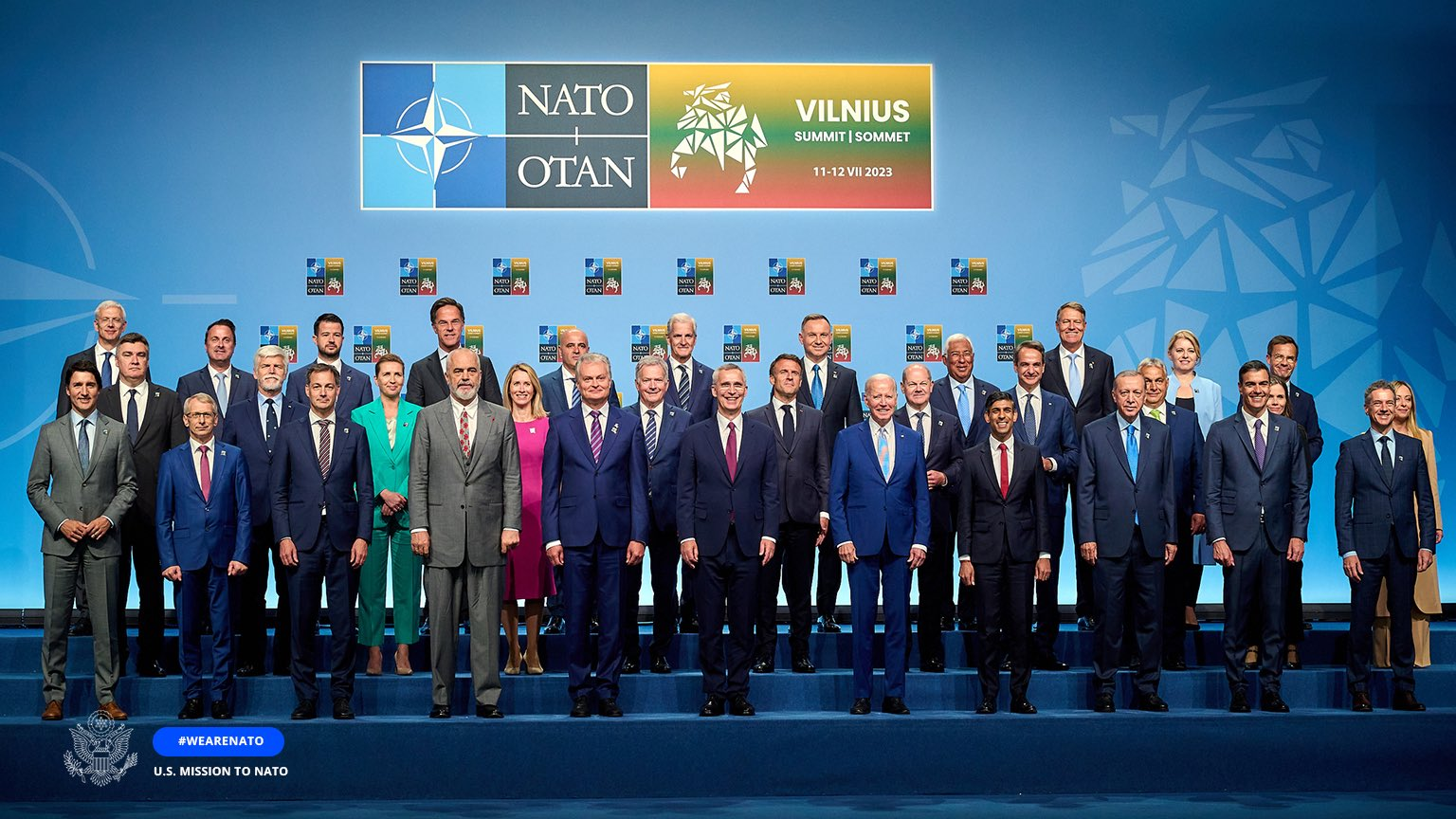
Family photo of the NATO Summit in Vilnius with Zuzana Čaputová, 2023

== See also ==
- List of elected and appointed female heads of state and government
- List of international trips made by Zuzana Čaputová

== Notes ==
Political offices
Preceded by Andrej Kiska	President of Slovakia; 2019–2024	Succeeded by Peter Pellegrini
