= Miyamae =

Miyamae (written: 宮前) is a Japanese surname. Notable people with the surname include:

- Ami Miyamae (宮前 杏実; born 1997), member of the Japanese idol girl group SKE48
- Maki Miyamae (宮前 真樹; born 1973), Japanese pop singer
- Shinzan Miyamae Roshi (宮前 心山; 1935–2021), Japanese Zen Buddhist rōshi

== See also ==
- Miyamae-ku, Kawasaki, a ward of Kawasaki in Kanagawa Prefecture, Japan
- Miyamae Station, a railway station in Wakayama Prefecture, Japan
