= Lalanath de Silva =

Sri Lankan-born environmental lawyer

Dr. Lalanath de Silva is a Sri Lankan born environmental lawyer, who currently serves as the Executive Director of the Environmental Law Alliance Worldwide. He served as the first Head of the Independent Redress Mechanism of the Green Climate Fund (GCF) established as the main funding mechanism under the United Nations Framework Convention on Climate Change (UNFCCC). He was appointed to this position by the 24-member board of the GCF and is one of the four board-appointed officials of the fund.

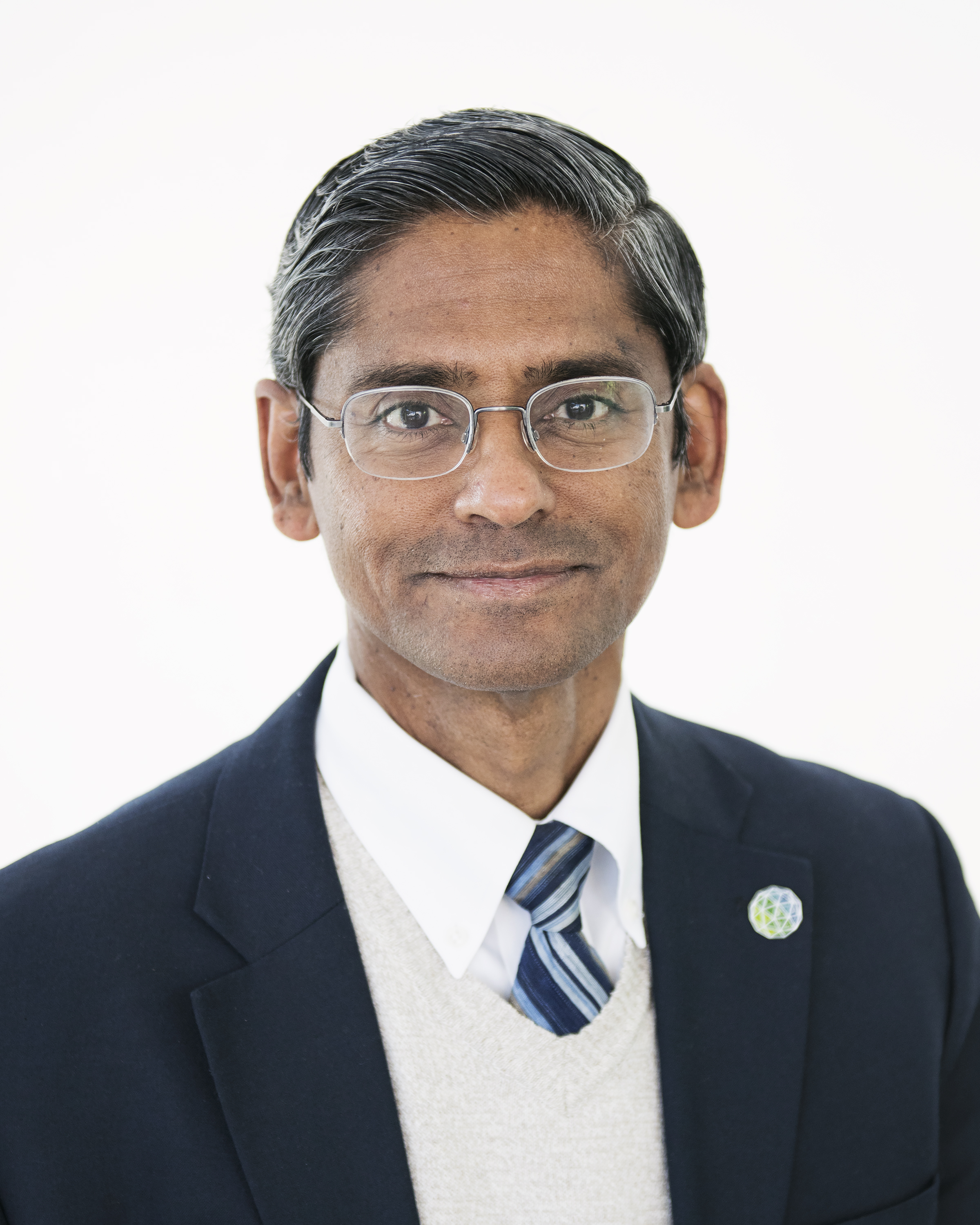

== Background and Education ==
He was born in Colombo, Sri Lanka. He graduated from the Sri Lanka Law College with Honours, winning the Hector Jayawardene Gold Medal for the Best Address to the Jury and the A.B Cooray Memorial Prize for Civil Procedure and Pleadings. He was admitted to the bar in 1982 by the Supreme Court of Sri Lanka and practiced as a litigator (advocate) pioneering environmental law in that country. In 1990, he obtained a Master of Laws degree in Law and Marine Affairs from the University of Washington, School of Law and was awarded a Humphrey fellowship at that University by the US Government. He obtained his PhD from the University of Sydney, Law School in 2014 defending his thesis on “International Conflict Related Environmental Claims- A Critical Analysis of the UN Compensation Commission”.

== Career ==
De Silva’s early career was as a litigator and lawyer in private practice in Sri Lanka. His practice included commercial and company law, human rights, administrative law and environmental law. As a law student, he co-founded the first-ever public interest environmental law firm in the developing world in 1981 – the Environmental Foundation (Gte) Ltd and led it as its President and Executive Director for ten years, growing it to an organization with 15 professional lawyers and scientists serving communities affected by environmental issues. Later he co-founded the Public Interest Law Foundation. After his return from his Humphrey Fellowship in USA, he was appointed by the Ministry of Environment as the first Legal Consultant in 1994. During his time at the Ministry, he was responsible for drafting and facilitating the enactment of much of Sri Lanka’s environmental regulations. Returning to private practice of the law, de Silva established environmental law courses in the Faculty of Law at the Colombo University and also litigated landmark environmental cases setting valuable precedents, including transforming the vehicular emission control regime in the country.

In 2002 he was appointed as a Legal Officer of the environmental claims unit of the United Nations Compensation Commission (UNCC) in Geneva, established by the UN Security Council to process war reparations claims from the first Gulf war in 1991. He handled the terrestrial and maritime claims from Saudi Arabia against Iraq and the Cultural heritage Claims from Iran.

After that work was concluded, in 2005, he was appointed as the Director of the Access Initiative by the World Resources Institute (WRI) in Washington DC. Later he was appointed as the Director of the Environmental Democracy Practice at WRI. During his tenure at WRI, he worked with civil society organizations and other stakeholders in over 50 countries to improve laws and policies on access to environmental information, public participation and access to justice and developed the novel environmental democracy index with data from 70 countries indexed against the UNEP’s Guidelines on Principle 10 of the Rio Declaration.

In 2012, he was appointed by the Board of the Asian Development Bank as a member of the Compliance Review Panel (CRP) of that Bank – one of the accountability mechanisms of the bank where people adversely affected by projects can file their grievances. During his tenure as a member of the CRP he led and contributed to compliance reviews in several Asian countries. In 2016 he was appointed by the Board of the Green Climate Fund to his current post as the Head of the Independent Redress Mechanism which is today regarded by other accountability mechanisms, international financial institutions and civil society as a leading mechanism with improved and modern mandates and procedures.

== Personal life ==
De Silva is married and has two daughters. He is also a composer and conductor having written several choral, orchestral and chamber works that have been performed around the world.
