= 2019 Slovak presidential election =

- 16 March 2019 (first round); 30 March 2019 (second round)
- Turnout: 48.74% (first round) ▲5.35pp 41.80% (second round) ▼8.67pp
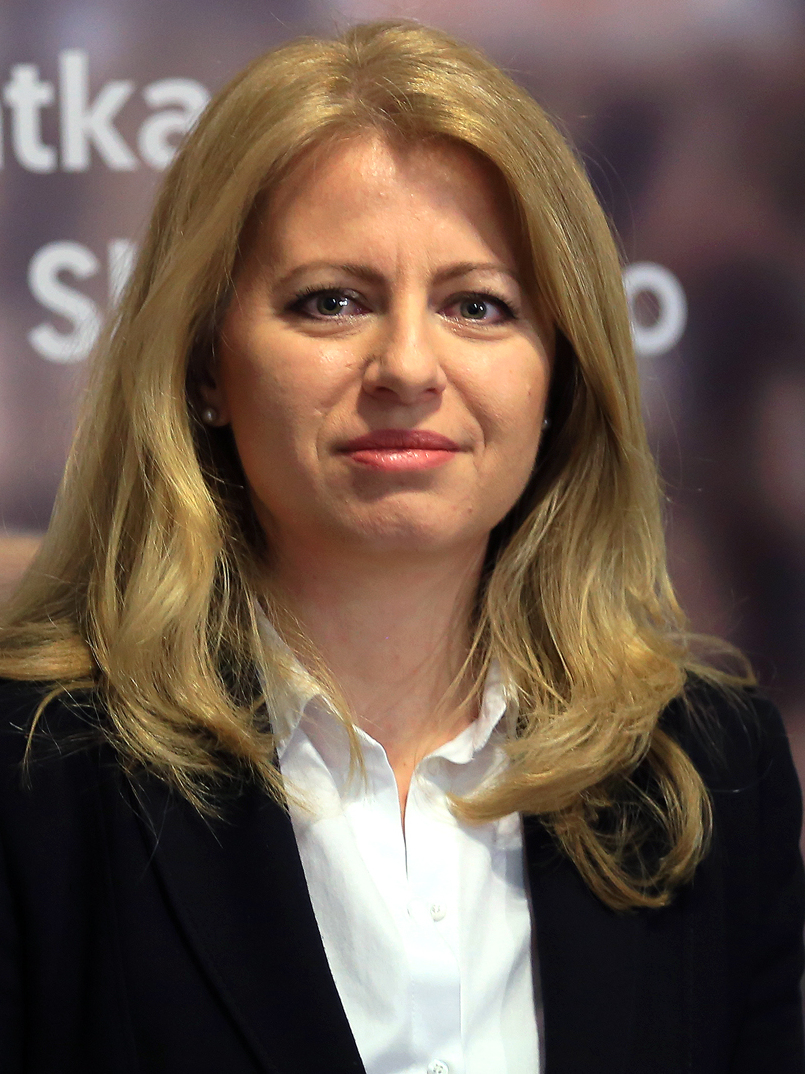

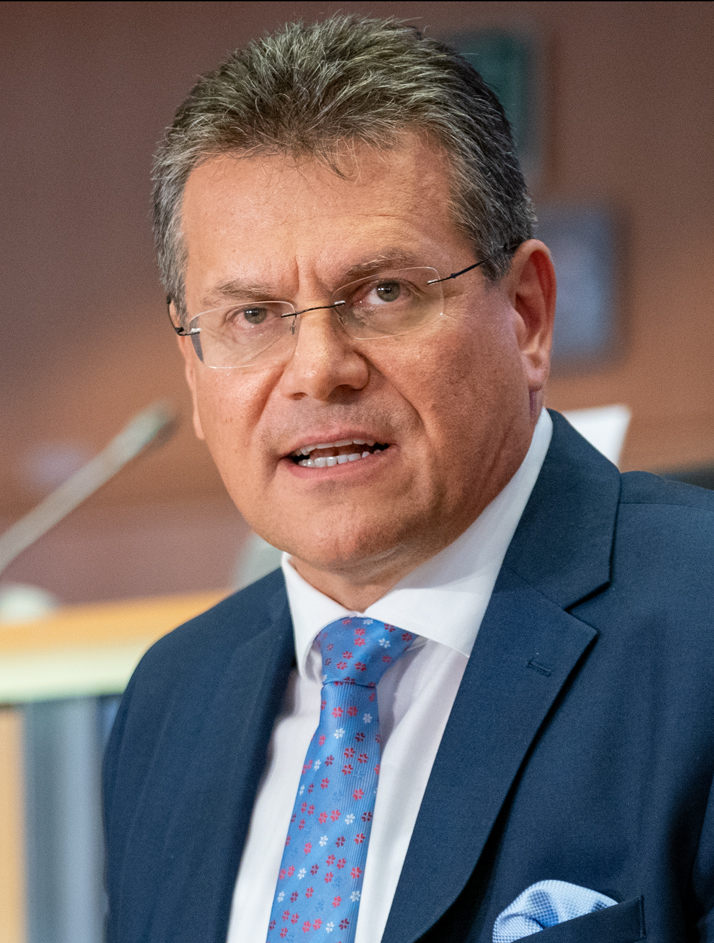
Nominee	Zuzana Čaputová	Maroš Šefčovič
Party	PS	Independent (Note: Although Šefčovič was officially an independent, his campaign was endorsed and funded by Smer.)
Popular vote	1,056,582	752,403
Percentage	58.41%	41.59%
President before election
Andrej Kiska
Independent
Elected President
Zuzana Čaputová
PS

Presidential elections were held in Slovakia in March 2019. Incumbent President Andrej Kiska did not run for a second term.

Fifteen candidates contested the first round on 16 March, of which two later formally withdrew their bids before voting took place, but their names still had to remain on the ballot papers. Zuzana Čaputová of the Progressive Slovakia party finished ahead of the other candidates, receiving 40.6% of the votes, but failed to achieve the necessary threshold of 50%+1 vote from all registered voters to avoid a run-off. Maroš Šefčovič, the vice president of the European Commission for the Energy Union, who was running as an independent supported by the Direction – Social Democracy (SMER–SD) party, came in as the runner-up with 18.7% of the vote and earned a place in the run-off as well.

In the second round on 30 March, Čaputová was elected with 58.4% of the vote to Šefčovič's 41.6%. She became the first woman to be elected to the presidency and became Slovakia's youngest-ever president upon her inauguration which took place on 15 June 2019.

== Background ==
Andrej Kiska was elected president in March 2014. He won the run-off with a large majority against then-prime minister Robert Fico.

Polls indicated that he was Slovakia's most trusted politician and that he would have likely been the frontrunner in the election, had he chosen to present himself as a candidate. He had originally planned to announce whether he would run for a second term in September 2018. but moved it on 15 May 2018. Freedom and Solidarity had announced it would support Kiska's candidacy. However, Kiska announced on 15 May 2018 that he would not run for re-election, arguing that this move might end "the era of political confrontation" his country faced and citing a desire to spend more time with his family. Kiska is notably pro-European.

Kiska's decision had been rumoured since February 2018 and political parties had already started to look for candidates.

- The socially and economically liberal party Freedom and Solidarity was speculated to nominate Robert Mistrík. He later withdrew.
- Veronika Remišová of the Christian-Democrat Ordinary People and Independent Personalities polled at 7.9% of the vote.
- Andrej Danko of the Slovak National Party polled at 13%.
- The anti-immigration party We Are Family had its candidate selected in May 2018.
- The governing coalition's biggest party Smer-SD, as of May 2018 still lacked a candidate. In January 2019, it was announced that the party candidate would be Maroš Šefčovič.
- The far-right Kotleba-ĽSNS nominated its leader Marian Kotleba on 31 May 2018.
- The centre-right Hungarian minority party Most-Híd nominated its leader Béla Bugár on 9 June 2018.

== Electoral system ==
The president of the Slovak Republic has been elected for a five-year term, and by popular vote since the elections in 1999. Its role is limited, but not just ceremonial. The president has the power to nominate the prime minister, to veto bills (unless confirmed by a two-thirds majority), and to nominate judges on the highest tiers of the judicial branch.

The president is elected through a two-round method; if no candidate reaches 50%+1 votes in the first round, the top two candidates of the first round take part in a second round.

For a candidacy to be valid, the Constitution of Slovakia requires the collection of 15,000 signatures of Slovak citizens, or the support of 15 of the 150 MPs in the legislature. The candidate must be an eligible voter over 40 years old, must resign from any other conflicting public office, and is limited to two terms in office.

== Candidates ==
Candidates who claimed 15,000 citizen signatures or have 15 MP signatures by midnight of 31 January 2019 were as follows:

Name	Party	Age	Date of candidacy announcement	Date of candidacy confirmation
Béla Bugár	Most–Híd	60	9 June 2018	6 September 2018
Zuzana Čaputová	PS	45	29 May 2018	24 January 2019
Martin Daňo	Independent	42	16 February 2018	24 January 2019
Štefan Harabin	Independent	61	18 April 2018	15 November 2018
Eduard Chmelár	Independent	47	23 April 2018	28 January 2019
Marian Kotleba	Kotleba-ĽSNS	41	31 May 2018	30 January 2019
Milan Krajniak	We Are Family	46	31 May 2018	11 August 2018
František Mikloško	Independent	71	6 June 2018	25 January 2019
Maroš Šefčovič	Independent	52	18 January 2019	31 January 2019
Róbert Švec	Independent	42	27 May 2018	25 November 2018
Bohumila Tauchmannová	Independent	60	1 March 2018	19 September 2018
Juraj Zábojník	Independent	56	19 February 2018	13 August 2018
Ivan Zuzula	SKS	64	31 January 2019	31 January 2019

=== Declined to run ===
- Andrej Kiska, 4th President
- Robert Fico, Former Prime Minister
- Peter Pellegrini, Then-Prime Minister
- Miroslav Lajčák, Minister of Foreign Affairs
- Iveta Radičová, Former Prime Minister
- Andrej Danko, Speaker of the National Council of Slovak Republic
- Boris Kollár, Member of Parliament and leader of We Are Family
- Imrich Béreš, Former Member of Parliament
- Marek Maďarič, Former Minister of Culture

=== Withdrawn ===
- Oskar Fegyveres, a witness in the kidnapping of Michal Kováč Jr., decided to endorse František Mikloško
- Gabriela Drobová, CEO & founder of FashionTV, former presenter and producer on Markíza
- József Menyhárt, leader of the Party of the Hungarian Community, decided to endorse Robert Mistrík
- Robert Mistrík, researcher, entrepreneur and co-founder of SaS, decided to endorse Zuzana Čaputová

== Campaign ==
During the campaign, Šefčovič (a Roman Catholic) spoke against any changes in LGBT rights status in Slovakia, strongly opposing both civil partnerships or same-sex adoptions. He criticised his opponent Čaputová (who is in favour of both) as a candidate who is forcing a "new ultraliberal agenda" on Slovakia, comparing the second round of elections to a referendum on such an agenda, which he considers to be "in exact contradiction to traditional Christian values". He also stated that "we can not support any further steps towards civil unions or same-sex adoptions because these would go precisely against our traditional Christian values", calling this stance as his "very natural position" due to his Christianity. According to his opinion, discussions about "such experiments bring great unrest to society".

Šefčovič has also criticised his opponent Čaputová for her opinions on the European migrant crisis and related policies. He asserted the importance of a speedy deportation policy, so that "people who do not have any business here are sent to their home countries as quickly as possible". Furthermore, he argued out that "it has to be Slovaks who decide who comes to our country".

Štefan Harabin ran on a platform of "traditional Slovak culture based on Christianity and family, formed by a man–father and woman–mother" and rejecting "gender ideology".

During the campaign Harabin accused Muslim migrants of "killing and raping European women in Germany and France" and claimed his opponents wanted to destroy Slovak culture. He also condemned NATO, European Union institutions as well as homosexuals. According to Globsec, Harabin was the most favoured candidate by "pro-Kremlin disinformation channels" on Facebook, receiving 174 positive and no negative posts.

== Opinion polls ==
=== First round ===
Date	Agency	Iveta Radičová	Andrej Danko	Veronika Remišová	Igor Matovič	Béla Bugár	Marian Kotleba	Štefan Harabin	Milan Krajniak	Maroš Šefčovič	Peter Pellegrini	Eduard Chmelár	Robert Mistrík	František Mikloško	Zuzana Čaputová	Martin Daňo	Marian Čaučík	Other/ Abstain
16 Mar 2019	First round election	N/A	N/A	N/A	N/A	3.1%	10.4%	14.3%	2.8%	18.6%	N/A	2.7%	N/A	5.7%	40.6%	0.5%	N/A	
26 Feb - 1 March 2019	Phoenix Research	—N/a	—N/a	—N/a	—N/a	9.1%	7.8%	15.2%	7.1%	19.8%	—N/a	5.1%	—N/a	6.7%	18.5%	2.5%	—N/a	8.2%
27–28 Feb 2019	AKO	—N/a	—N/a	—N/a	—N/a	4.1%	5.6%	11.4%	2.4%	16.7%	—N/a	1.5%	—N/a	3.1%	52.9%	—N/a	—N/a	—N/a
26-28 Feb 2019	Focus	—N/a	—N/a	—N/a	—N/a	3.2%	8.2%	12.0%	2.4%	22.1%	—N/a	2.5%	—N/a	3.5%	44.8%	0.9%	—N/a	—N/a
27 February 2019	Restartup	—N/a	—N/a	—N/a	—N/a	7.6%	9.1%	9.8%	5.2%	13.5%	—N/a	3.2%	—N/a	5.2%	37.9%	2.7%	—N/a	—N/a
22-25 Feb 2019	AKO	—N/a	—N/a	—N/a	—N/a	5.9%	4.5%	11.7%	6.1%	17.1%	—N/a	2.2%	16.8%	3.9%	27.5%	2.6%	—N/a	—N/a
21-26 Feb 2019	FOCUS	—N/a	—N/a	—N/a	—N/a	5.8%	8.5%	13.0%	4.3%	20.4%	—N/a	2.0%	13.1%	4.3%	26.3%	0.7%	—N/a	—N/a
11-23 Feb 2019	Median	—N/a	—N/a	—N/a	—N/a	6.5%	7.5%	10.5%	5.5%	20.5%	—N/a	3.0%	15.0%	5.0%	23.5%	1.0%	—N/a	—N/a
13–19 Feb 2019	MVK	—N/a	—N/a	—N/a	—N/a	7.6%	7.0%	8.7%	3.5%	32.8%	—N/a	2.2%	—N/a	8.9%	27.6%	0.5%	—N/a	1.1%
13–19 Feb 2019	MVK	—N/a	—N/a	—N/a	—N/a	6.3%	6.5%	8.3%	3.1%	30.3%	—N/a	1.7%	14.2%	7.3%	19.4%	0.3%	—N/a	2.5%
12–15 Feb 2019	AKO	—N/a	—N/a	—N/a	—N/a	6.5%	8.2%	12.1%	5.6%	19.7%	—N/a	3.5%	18.2%	2.9%	17.4%	2.3%	—N/a	1.5%
7–12 Feb 2019	Focus	—N/a	—N/a	—N/a	—N/a	7.4%	8.9%	13.6%	6.3%	20.1%	—N/a	3.5%	17.1%	4.5%	14.4%	1.0%	—N/a	3.1%
8–12 Feb 2019	AKO	—N/a	—N/a	—N/a	—N/a	7.4%	6.9%	12.8%	7.8%	18.2%	—N/a	5.0%	15.8%	5.5%	14.7%	1.7%	—N/a	3.2%
28 January 2019	Restartup	—N/a	—N/a	—N/a	—N/a	7.8%	9.5%	12.6%	6.1%	12.5%	—N/a	3.6%	16.3%	6.5%	10.2%	3.5%	—N/a	—N/a
16–23 Jan 2019	Focus	—N/a	7.8%	—N/a	—N/a	10.1%	8.2%	11.7%	7.0%	16.5%	—N/a	2.3%	16.5%	6.7%	9.0%	0.1%	—N/a	4.1%
10–15 Jan 2019	AKO	—N/a	7.5%	—N/a	—N/a	11.0%	7.3%	13.0%	10.1%	19.4%	—N/a	4.3%	—N/a	—N/a	18.5%	1.2%	—N/a	—N/a
Aug–Sep 2018	AKO	—N/a	9.7%	—N/a	4.6%	8.6%	4.7%	8.8%	4.4%	—N/a	11.9%	10.8%	12.1%	7.1%	6.9%	2.7%	1.9%	5.8%
24–30 Apr 2018	Focus	13.9%	12.1%	7.8%	—N/a	5.3%	5.0%	4.6%	—N/a	2.8%	—N/a	1.4%	1.0%	—N/a	—N/a	—N/a	0.5%	45.9%

=== Second round ===
Date	Agency	Maroš Šefčovič	Zuzana Čaputová
30 Mar 2019	Second round election	41.59%	58.41%
28–29 March 2019	Focus	44.8%	55.2%
17–19 March 2019	Median	39.5%	60.5%
16 March 2019	Focus	35.6%	64.4%
26–28 February 2019	Focus	36.0%	64.0%
27 February 2019	Restartup	35.5%	64.5%
12–15 February 2019	AKO	45.1%	54.9%
7–12 February 2019	Focus	51.9%	48.1%
16–23 January 2019	Focus	58.0%	42.0%

Hypothetical polling

Čaputová vs Harabin

Date	Agency	Zuzana Čaputová	Štefan Harabin
26–28 February 2019	Focus	72.4%	27.6%
27 February 2019	Restartup	71.1%	28.9%

Šefčovič vs Harabin

Date	Agency	Maroš Šefčovič	Štefan Harabin
27 February 2019	Restartup	61.6%	38.4%
16–23 January 2019	Focus	65.4%	34.6%

Šefcovič vs Mistrík

Date	Agency	Maroš Šefčovič	Robert Mistrík
12–15 February 2019	AKO	44.7%	55.3%
7–12 February 2019	Focus	49.2%	50.8%
16–23 January 2019	Focus	50.1%	49.9%

Mistrík vs Harabin

Date	Agency	Robert Mistrík	Štefan Harabin
16–23 January 2019	Focus	63.8%	36.2%

==== Kiska's Second term ====
This lists polls that asked people if they want Andrej Kiska as president for Second term.

Date	Agency	For	Against
24–30 April 2018	Focus	42.7	42.6

== Results ==
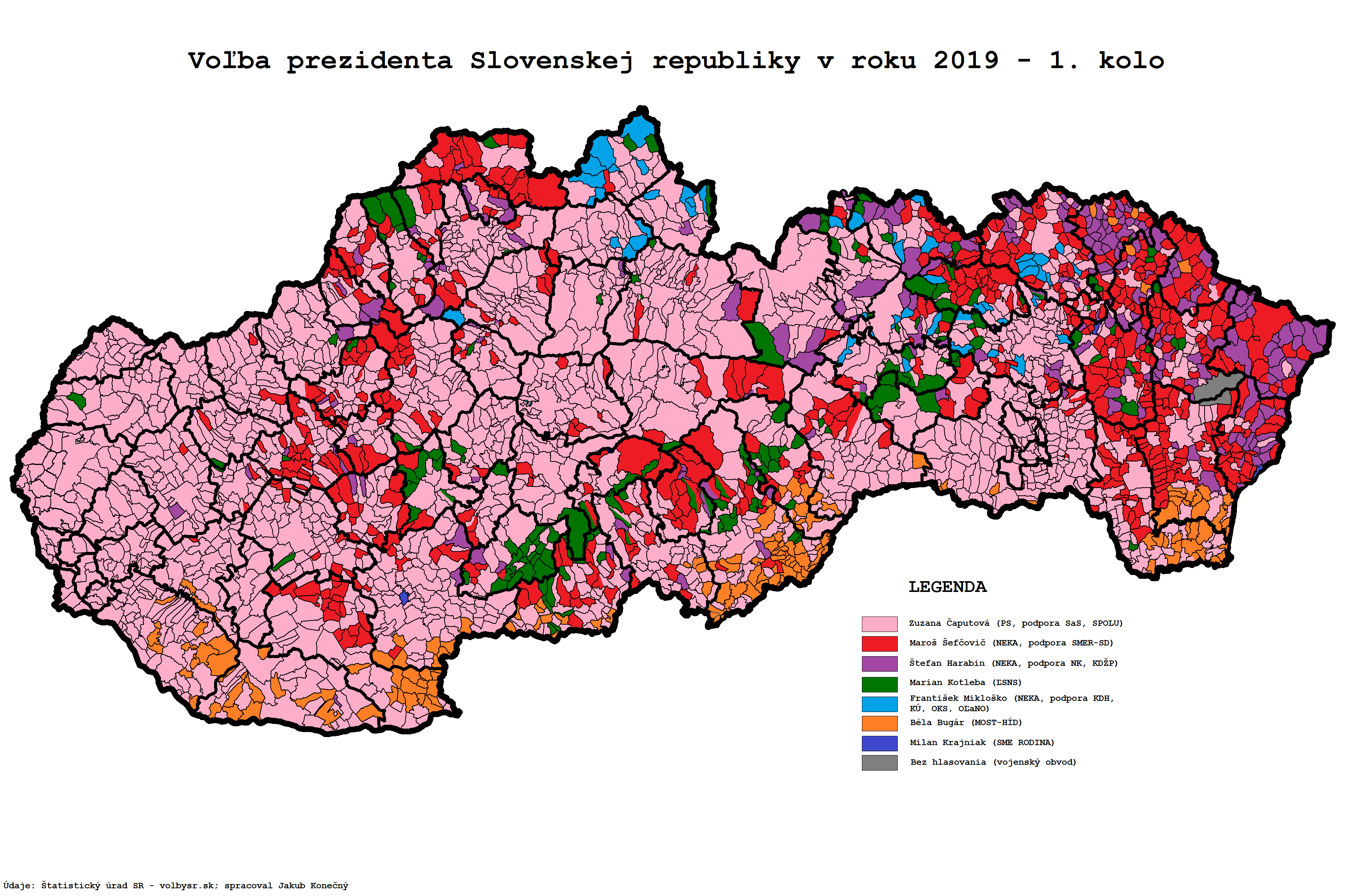
The results of the first round of 2019 presidential elections in Slovakia in the level of municipalities. Municipalities are coloured in the colour of winning candidate (with most votes in each municipality), in cases with split wins, all winning candidates' colours are given

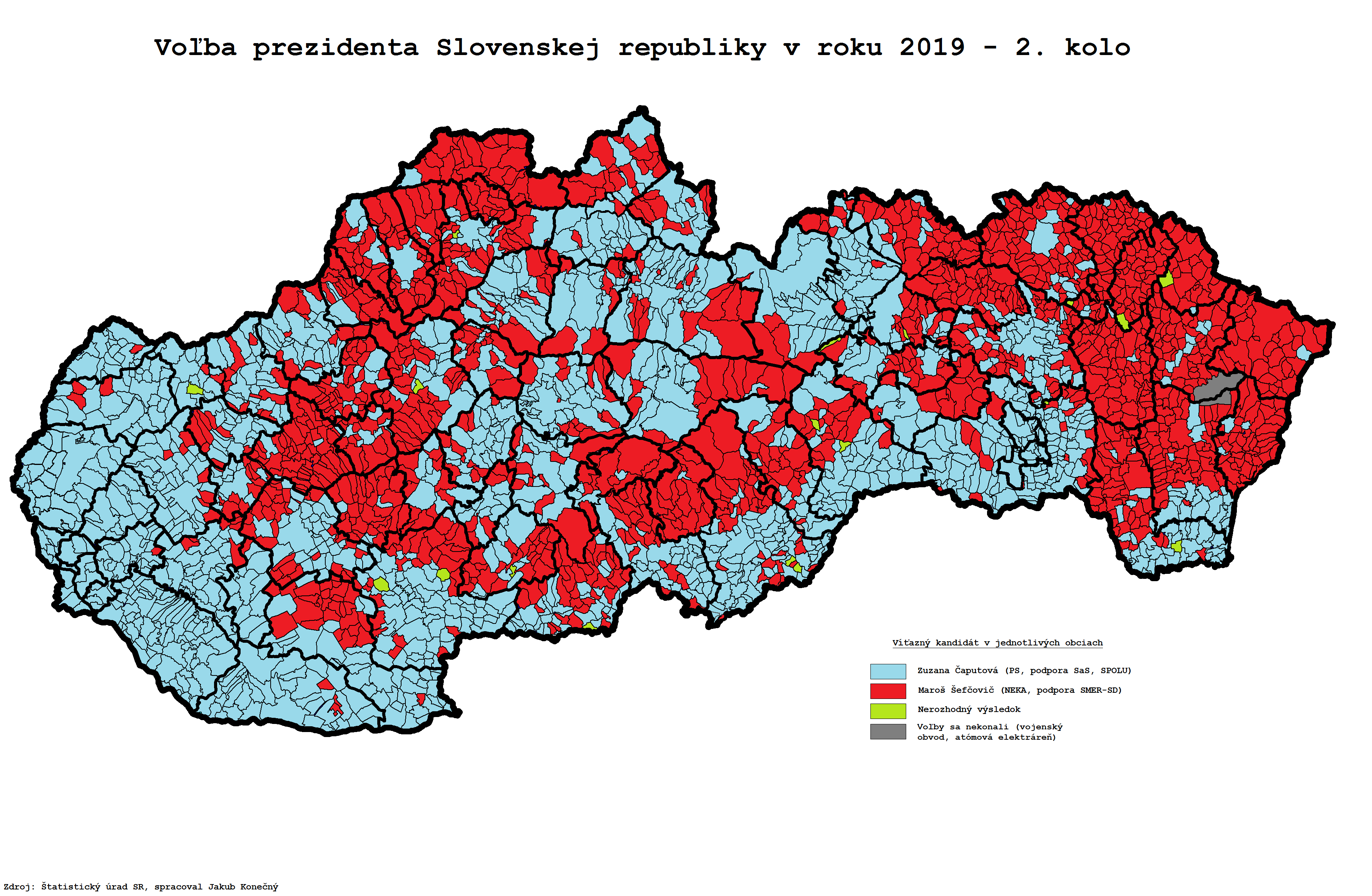
The results of second round of Presidential election in Slovakia in 2019 in the municipality level. The municipalities are coloured in the colour of winning candidate (red: Maroš Šefčovič, blue: Zuzana Čaputová, green: tie, gray: no election held (military district).)

Zuzana Čaputová of the Progressive Slovakia party finished far ahead of the other candidates, receiving 41% of the vote, but failed to achieve the necessary threshold of 50%+1 vote from all registered voters to avoid a run-off. Maroš Šefčovič, the vice president of the European Commission for the Energy Union, who was running as an independent supported by the governing Smer-SD, was the runner-up with 19% of the vote and earned the other place in the run-off. Voter turnout in the first round was 49%, the highest first round turnout since direct voting for the presidency was introduced in 1999.

In the second round, Čaputová won election to the presidency, receiving 58% of the vote to Šefčovič's 42%. She became the first woman to be elected to the position and became Slovakia's youngest-ever president upon her inauguration on 15 June 2019. The second round turnout of just 42% was the lowest for any round of a presidential election in Slovakia. The number of votes with which Čaputová was elected to office is also the lowest for any directly elected Slovak president to date.

Candidate	Party	First round		Second round	
Candidate	Party	Votes	%	Votes	%
Zuzana Čaputová	Progressive Slovakia	870,415	40.57	1,056,582	58.41
Maroš Šefčovič	Independent (Direction – Social Democracy)	400,379	18.66	752,403	41.59
Štefan Harabin	Independent	307,823	14.35		
Marian Kotleba	Kotleba – People's Party Our Slovakia	222,935	10.39		
František Mikloško	Independent	122,916	5.73		
Béla Bugár	Most–Híd	66,667	3.11		
Milan Krajniak	We Are Family	59,464	2.77		
Eduard Chmelár	Independent	58,965	2.75		
Martin Daňo	Independent	11,146	0.52		
Róbert Švec	Independent	6,567	0.31		
Juraj Zábojník	Independent	6,219	0.29		
Ivan Zuzula	Slovak Conservative Party	3,807	0.18		
Bohumila Tauchmannová	Independent	3,535	0.16		
Robert Mistrík (Note: Candidate withdrew, but was still on the ballot.)	Independent	3,318	0.15		
József Menyhárt	Party of the Hungarian Community	1,208	0.06		
Total		2,145,364	100.00	1,808,985	100.00
Valid votes		2,145,364	99.37	1,808,985	97.92
Invalid/blank votes		13,495	0.63	38,432	2.08
Total votes		2,158,859	100.00	1,847,417	100.00
Registered voters/turnout		4,429,033	48.74	4,419,883	41.80
Source: Statistics.sk (first round), (second round)
