= Maroš Šefčovič =

Slovak politician and diplomat (born 1966)

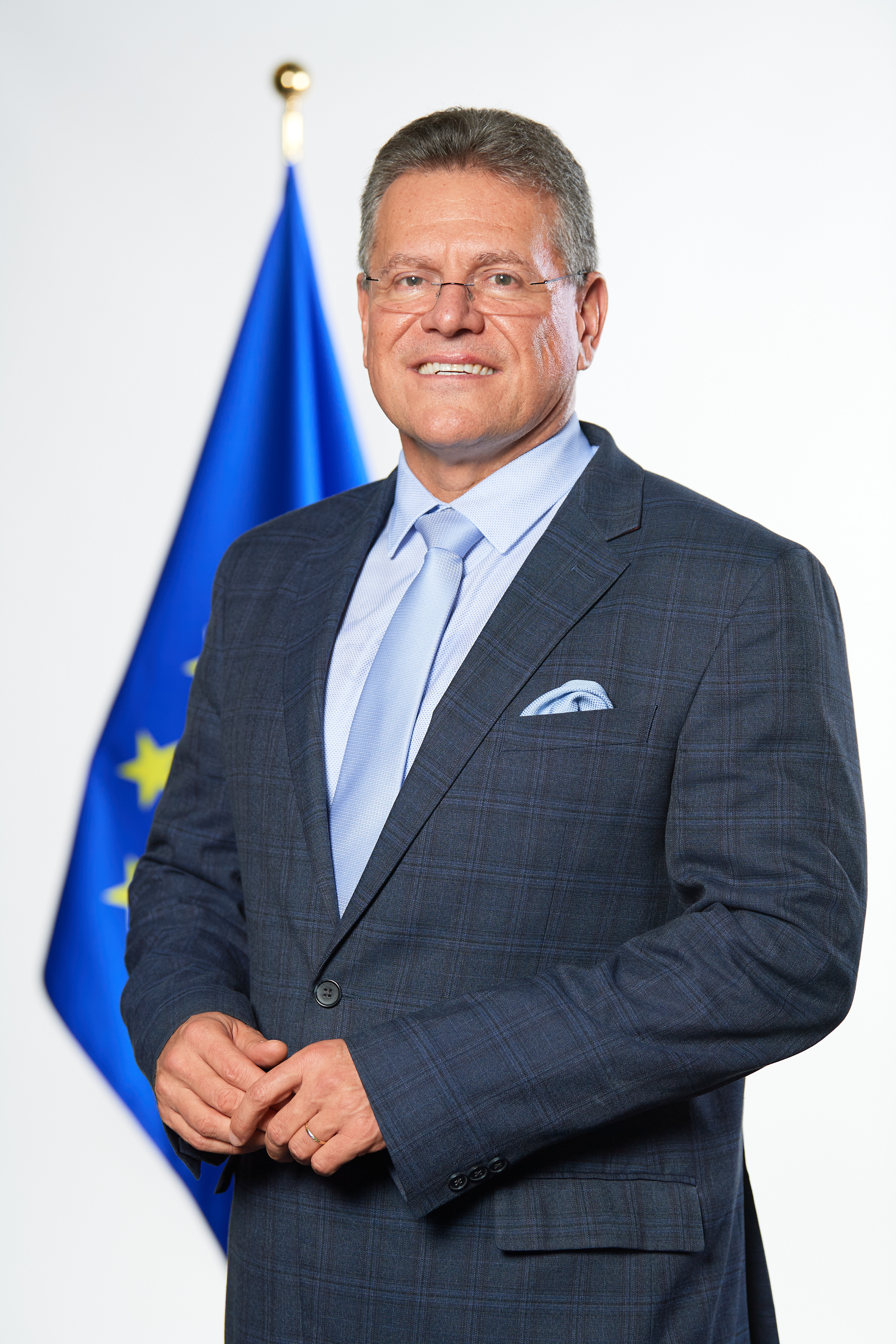
- Official portrait, 2024

European Commissioner for Trade and Economic Security and for Interinstitutional Relations and Transparency
- Incumbent
- Assumed office 1 December 2024
- Commission: Von der Leyen II
- Preceded by: Valdis Dombrovskis (Trade); Věra Jourová (Transparency)

Executive Vice-President of the European Commission for the European Green Deal
- In office 22 August 2023 – 30 November 2024; Acting: 22 August 2023 – 5 October 2023
- Commission: Von der Leyen I
- Preceded by: Frans Timmermans
- Succeeded by: Teresa Ribera

Vice-President of the European Commission for Interinstitutional Relations
- In office 1 December 2019 – 30 November 2024
- Commission: Von der Leyen I
- Preceded by: Frans Timmermans
- Succeeded by: Himself, as commissioner
- In office 9 February 2010 – 1 November 2014
- Commission: Barroso II
- Preceded by: Margot Wallström (Institutional Relations and Communication Strategy); Siim Kallas (Administrative Affairs, Audit and Anti-Fraud)
- Succeeded by: Frans Timmermans

European Commissioner for Climate Action Acting
- In office 22 August 2023 – 9 October 2023
- Commission: Von der Leyen I
- Preceded by: Frans Timmermans
- Succeeded by: Wopke Hoekstra

European Commissioner for Digital Single Market Acting
- In office 3 July 2019 – 30 November 2019
- Commission: Juncker
- Preceded by: Andrus Ansip
- Succeeded by: Office abolished Margrethe Vestager (Executive Vice President)

European Commissioner for Health and Consumer Policy Acting
- In office 16 October 2012 – 28 November 2012
- Commission: Barroso II
- Preceded by: John Dalli
- Succeeded by: Tonio Borg

European Commissioner for Energy
- In office 1 November 2014 – 30 November 2019
- Commission: Juncker
- Preceded by: Günther Oettinger
- Succeeded by: Kadri Simson

European Commissioner for Education, Training, Culture and Youth
- In office 1 October 2009 – 9 February 2010
- Commission: Barroso I
- Preceded by: Ján Figeľ
- Succeeded by: Androulla Vassiliou (Education, Culture, Multilingualism and Youth)

Ambassador of Slovakia to the European Union
- In office 2004 – 30 September 2009

Ambassador of Slovakia to Israel
- In office 1999–2002

Personal details
- Born: 24 July 1966 (age 60) Bratislava, Czechoslovakia (now Slovakia)
- Party: Smer–SD (1999–present)
- Other political affiliations: KSČ (before 1990)
- Spouse: Helena Šefčovičová
- Children: 3
- Education: Moscow State Institute of International Relations; Comenius University

Maroš Šefčovič (Note: Slovak pronunciation: [ˈmarɔʂ ˈʂeftʂɔʋitʂ]) (born 24 July 1966) is a Slovak diplomat and politician serving as European Commissioner for Trade and Economic Security; Interinstitutional Relations and Transparency (2024–2029) in the Von der Leyen Commission II. Prior to that, he was the Executive Vice-President of the European Commission for the European Green Deal from 2023 to 2024, as well as Vice-President of the European Commission for Interinstitutional Relations since 2019, previously holding the office from 2010 to 2014. He has been a member of the European Commission since 2009. Šefčovič also stood for office in the 2019 Slovak presidential election, which he lost to Zuzana Čaputová.

Šefčovič served as European Commissioner for Education, Training, Culture and Youth from 2009 to 2010 and Vice-President of the European Commission for Interinstitutional Relations and Administration from 2010 to 2014. He served as European Commissioner for Energy from 2014 to 2019. In 2019, Šefčovič was appointed Vice-President for Interinstitutional Relations and Foresight.

He is currently the longest serving EU Commissioner, and the second longest serving ever, after Wilhelm Haferkamp.

== Early life and studies ==
Born in Bratislava, Šefčovič originally enrolled at the University of Economics in his hometown in 1984, but left the university after one year to pursue a degree in Russia at Moscow State Institute of International Relations, where he studied from 1985 to 1990.

In June 1987, Šefčovič became a candidate for membership of the Communist Party of Czechoslovakia. After the two-year candidacy period, during which he had to secure three approvals from other party members and undertook to "deepen his knowledge of Marxism–Leninism", he filed an application for party membership in May 1989. The party approved his application on 1 June 1989 and he became an official member.

In 2000, he obtained a PhD in international law at Comenius University in Bratislava. The subject of his dissertation thesis was Sources of the EU law and respective legislative procedures.

== Diplomatic career ==
Šefčovič is a former diplomat, having served in Zimbabwe, Canada, as well as the Slovak ambassador to Israel (1999–2002). He was also the Permanent Representative of the Slovak Republic to the European Union (2004–2009).

== Political career ==
=== European Commission ===
==== 2009–2010: European Commissioner for Education, Training, Culture and Youth ====
Šefčovič replaced Ján Figeľ as European Commissioner for Education, Training, Culture and Youth on 1 October 2009.

==== 2010–2014: Vice-President for Interinstitutional Relations and Administration ====
Šefčovič's responsibilities included the administration of the Commission and management of some of the Commission's Internal Services; in particular consolidation of administrative reform, personnel and administration, European Schools and security. From 19 April 2014 to 25 May 2014, José Manuel Barroso was an Acting Commissioner in Šefčovič's stead while he was on electoral campaign leave for the 2014 elections to the European Parliament.

==== 2014–2019: European Commissioner for Energy ====
Šefčovič was appointed Vice-President of the European Commission for Energy Union in 2014. In July 2015, he brokered an agreement between fifteen countries from central, eastern and southeast Europe to speed up the building of gas links, improve security of supply, reduce their reliance on Russia and develop a fully integrated energy market.

When digital single market Andrus Ansip stepped down from the European Commission to take up his seat in the European Parliament following the 2019 elections, the Commission's President Jean-Claude Juncker announced that Ansip's portfolio would be transferred to Šefčovič.

==== 2019–2024: Vice-President for Interinstitutional Relations and Foresight ====
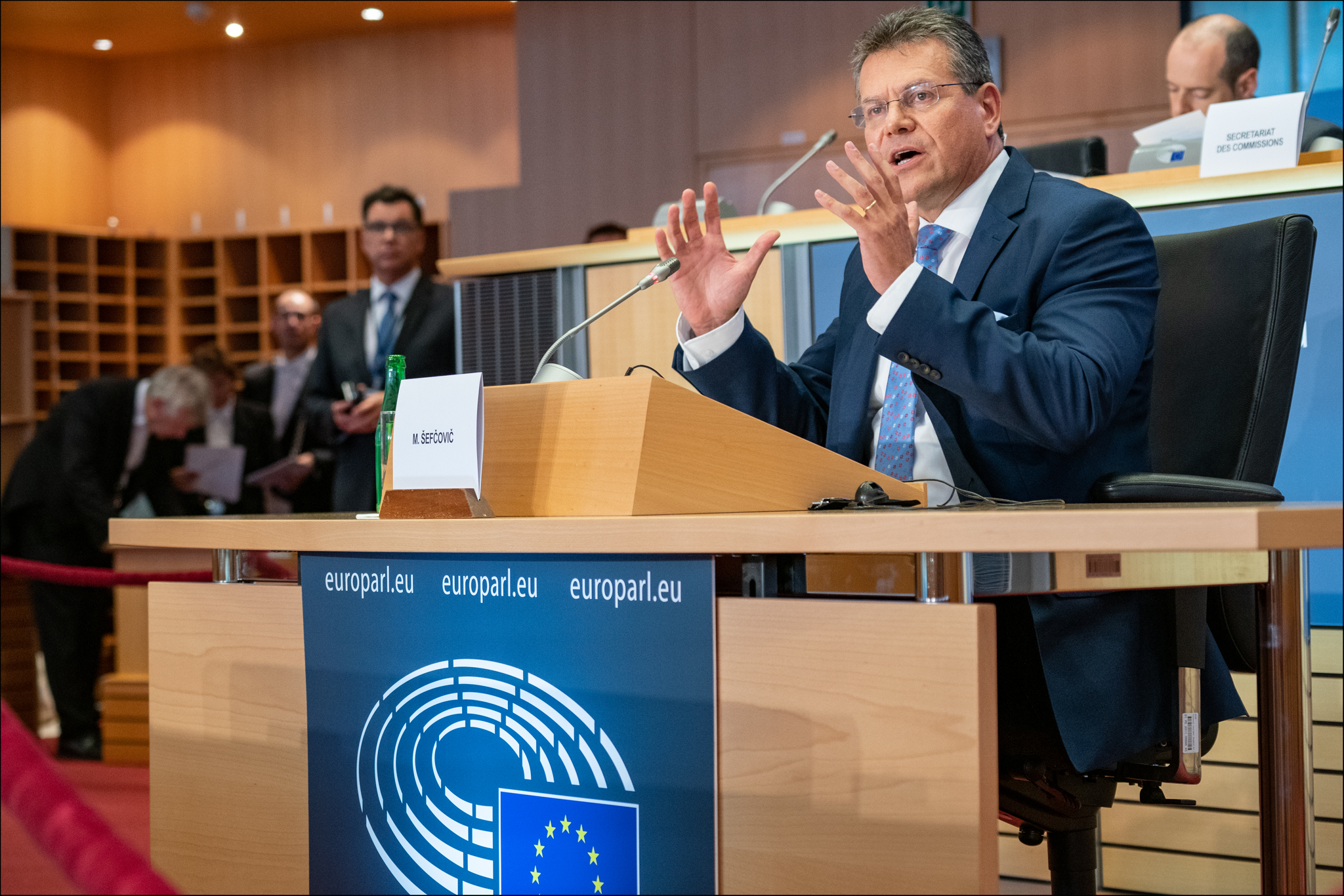
Šefčovič testifies before the European Parliament in 2019

In September 2019, newly-elected president of the European Commission Ursula von der Leyen named Šefčovič as vice-president for interinstitutional relations and foresight. From 2021, he served as co-chairman and represented the European Union in the Partnership Council established by the EU-UK Trade and Cooperation Agreement. In 2023, von der Leyen appointed Šefčovič to replace Frans Timmermans as European Commissioner for Climate Action.

==== 2023–2024: Executive Vice-President for the European Green Deal ====
On 22 August 2023, after Frans Timmermans resigned from the European Commission to run in the 2023 Dutch general election for the GroenLinks–PvdA alliance, Šefčovič succeeded him as Executive Vice-President for the European Green Deal. The position of European Commissioner for Climate Action was also assigned to Šefčovič on a temporary basis until a permanent successor has been chosen by the Netherlands.

On 19 July 2024, following EU pressure, Serbian President Aleksandar Vučić, German Chancellor Olaf Scholz and Maroš Šefčovič met and signed an agreement regarding the European Union's access to "critical raw materials" mined in Serbia, representing a further step towards facilitating the Jadar mining project. If completed, the project could supply 90% of Europe's current lithium needs.

==== 2024– : European Commissioner for Trade and Economic Security ====
Šefčovič was appointed European Commissioner for Trade and Economic Security in 2024.

In 2025, he has announced an agreement on future trade framework with Ukraine, giving Ukraine favourable treatment to its exports to the EU, while protecting the agrifood sector in several Member States fearing the excessive influx of Ukrainian products by committing Ukraine to gradually align its agricultural production standards with those of the EU by 2028 and a safeguard mechanism. The agreement increased the quotas for some agrifood products, such as eggs, sugar and wheat, and abolished them for the least sensitive ones, such as whole milk powder and fermented milk.

In September 2025, Šefčovič voiced support for closer trade relations between the EU and India, saying, "We are fully aware of the enormous potential for our mutual trade. It's about strategic choices. And clearly, India is a strategic partner, from any angle you would look at it."

=== 2019 Slovak presidential campaign ===
On 18 January 2019, Šefčovič announced that he would stand as a candidate in the 2019 Slovak presidential race, with support of the Smer–SD party.

In the first round of the election held on 16 March, Šefčovič received 18.66% of the vote and came in second place after Zuzana Čaputová, who received 40.57% of votes. They both qualified for the second round run-off, which took place on 30 March. Šefčovič was defeated by Čaputová, receiving 41.59% of the vote versus 58.41% of votes for his opponent.

== Other activities ==
- GLOBSEC, Member of the International Advisory Council

== Political positions ==
=== LGBT stance and other social issues ===
During his presidential campaign, Šefčovič repeatedly spoke against legislative changes which would improve the status of LGBT rights in Slovakia, strongly opposing both civil partnerships and same-sex adoptions. He dubbed his opponent Čaputová (who is in favour of both) as a candidate who is forcing a "new ultraliberal agenda" on Slovakia, comparing the second round of elections to a referendum on such an agenda, which he considered to be "in exact contradiction to traditional Christian values". He also stated that "we cannot support any further steps towards civil unions or same-sex adoptions because these would go precisely against our traditional Christian values", calling this stance as his "very natural position" due to his Christianity. According to his opinion, discussions about "such experiments bring great unrest to society". Šefčovič supported and welcomed the position of the Slovak parliament and government not to ratify the Istanbul Convention (aimed against violence against women and domestic violence), citing his concerns about so-called "gender ideology".

=== International relations and foreign policy ===
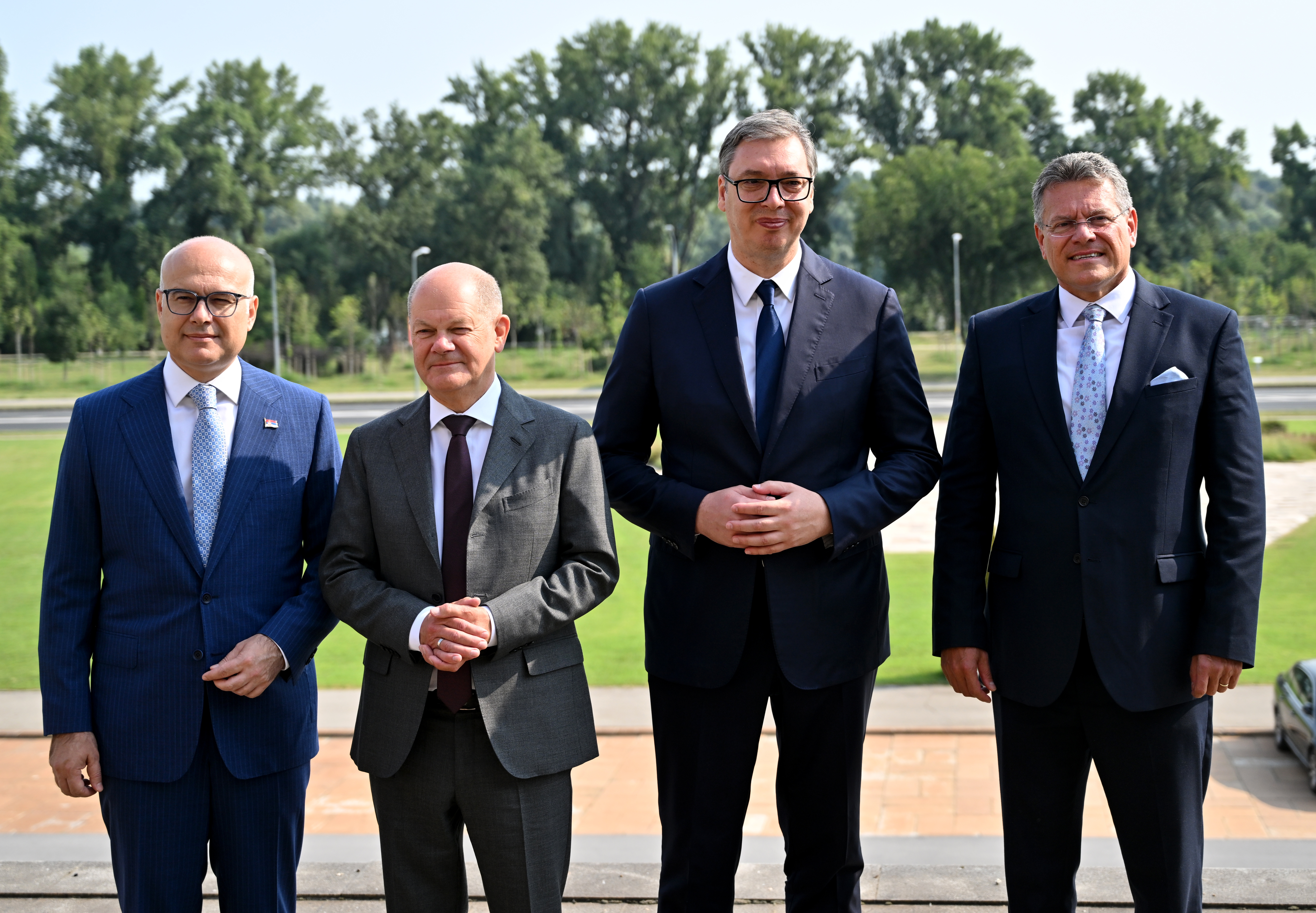
Šefčovič with Olaf Scholz, Aleksandar Vučić and Miloš Vučević in July 2024

Šefčovič also criticised his opponent Čaputová for her opinions on the migrant crisis and related policies. He emphasised the importance of a speedy deportation policy, so that "people who do not have any business here are sent to their home countries as quickly as possible". Furthermore, he pointed out that "it has to be Slovaks who decide who comes to our country". Šefčovič has criticized Angela Merkel's actions in this area, labeling her "latest decisions which opened door to mass migration" as something that was not "thought-out very well".

In the matter of Russia–EU relations, Šefčovič emphasised that he does not consider Russia to be any kind of threat. He also criticised imposed sanctions, stating that people are suffering from them.

When asked about the Venezuelan presidential crisis, Šefčovič refused to identify either Nicolás Maduro or Juan Guaidó as legitimate president, stating that "leaning on one or the other side might worsen the situation".

=== European Union ===
Šefčovič rejects the idea of EU federalization, saying he is "against creating a European superstate", and considers tax policy, autonomous migration policy, and family law issues to be "red lines" which should not be crossed by the European Union.

== Personal life ==
Šefčovič is married to Helena Šefčovičová, with whom he has three children: Helena, Martina, and Maroš.

Political offices
| Preceded by Ján Figeľ | Slovak European Commissioner; 2009–present | Incumbent |
| Preceded by Ján Figeľ | European Commissioner for Education, Training, Culture and Youth; 2009–2010 | Succeeded by Androulla Vassiliou as European Commissioner for Education, Culture, Multilingualism and Youth |
| Preceded by Margot Wallström as European Commissioner for Institutional Relations and Communication Strategy | European Commissioner for Interinstitutional Relations and Administration; 2010–2014 | Succeeded by Frans Timmermans as European Commissioner for Better Regulation, Interinstitutional Relations, Rule of Law and Charter of Fundamental Rights |
| Preceded by Siim Kallas as European Commissioner for Administrative Affairs, Audit and Anti-Fraud | European Commissioner for Interinstitutional Relations and Administration; 2010–2014 | Succeeded by Frans Timmermans as European Commissioner for Better Regulation, Interinstitutional Relations, Rule of Law and Charter of Fundamental Rights |
| Preceded by John Dalli | European Commissioner for Health and Consumer Policy; Acting; 2012 | Succeeded by Tonio Borg |
| Preceded by Günther Oettinger as European Commissioner for Energy | European Commissioner for the Energy Union; 2014–present | Incumbent |
| Preceded by Andrus Ansip | European Commissioner for Digital Single Market; Acting; 2019–present | Incumbent |
