= Robert Mistrík =

Slovak scientist and politician

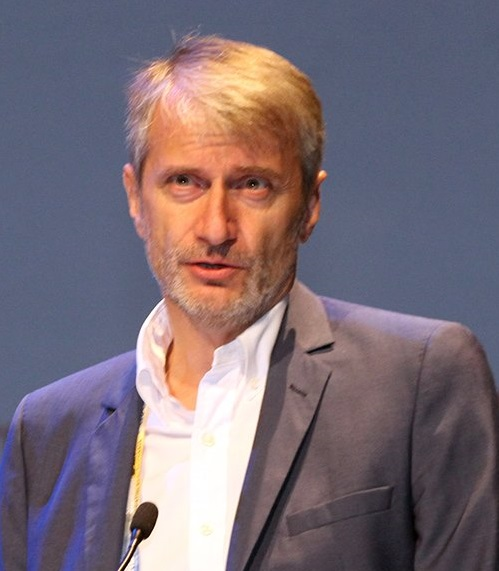

Personal details
- Born: 13 August 1966 (age 60) Banská Bystrica, Czechoslovakia (now Slovakia)
- Party: Freedom and Solidarity (2010-2012); Independent
- Spouse: Zuzana Mistríková
- Children: Two sons
- Education: Slovak Technical University; University of Vienna

Robert Mistrík (Slovak pronunciation: [ˈrɔbert ˈmistriːk], born 13 August 1966) is a Slovak chemist, scientist, businessman, and politician.

== Early life ==
Mistrík was born on 13 August 1966 in Banská Bystrica. He attended Gymnázium Jozefa Gregora Tajovského in Banská Bystrica. In 1991, he graduated with a degree in Analytical Chemistry from the Faculty of Chemical Technology of the Slovak University of Technology in Bratislava. After completing a PhD at the University of Vienna in 1994, Mistrík continued his scientific career as a visiting scholar at the National Institute of Standards and Technology in Gaithersburg, Maryland.

== Early career ==
In 1998, Mistrík founded the mass spectrometry, metabolomics and chemical analysis firm HighChem, which he still manages. Mistrík served as a member of the scientific steering committee in the METAcancer consortium, focused on the search for breast cancer biomarkers. He is the author of a patent for the identification of small molecules, including novel diagnostic markers of insidious diseases, as well as Mass Frontier software.

On 3 February 2009, Mistrík became the laureate of the scientific award "Head of the Year" for the most significant innovation. In 2014, he was re-elected director by members of the international Metabolomics Society.

Mistrík leads the development of a cloud-based spectral tree database called mzCloud, which enables the identification of multiple scientific problems. He is also the co-author of the method of searching mass spectra via Google, published in Nature Biotechnology. It was an achievement that a scientist from a Slovak institution managed after 14 years.

== Political career ==
=== Freedom and Solidarity ===
In 2009, Mistrík co-founded Freedom and Solidarity as a member of the preparatory committee. He was a member of the party until 2012.

=== 2019 Slovak presidential election ===
On 15 May 2018, Mistrík announced his candidacy as President of Slovakia in the 2019 Slovak presidential election, only to rule out after the announcement of Zuzana Čaputová as new President of Slovakia.

=== Doping of Matej Tóth ===
In 2017, Mistrík served on a panel of experts involved in the case of Slovak race walker Matej Tóth, who had been accused of doping. Mistrík also led a domestic public presentation of expert arguments proving Tóth's innocence, who was cleared of all suspicions and cleared by the IAAF.
