= Zen yoga =

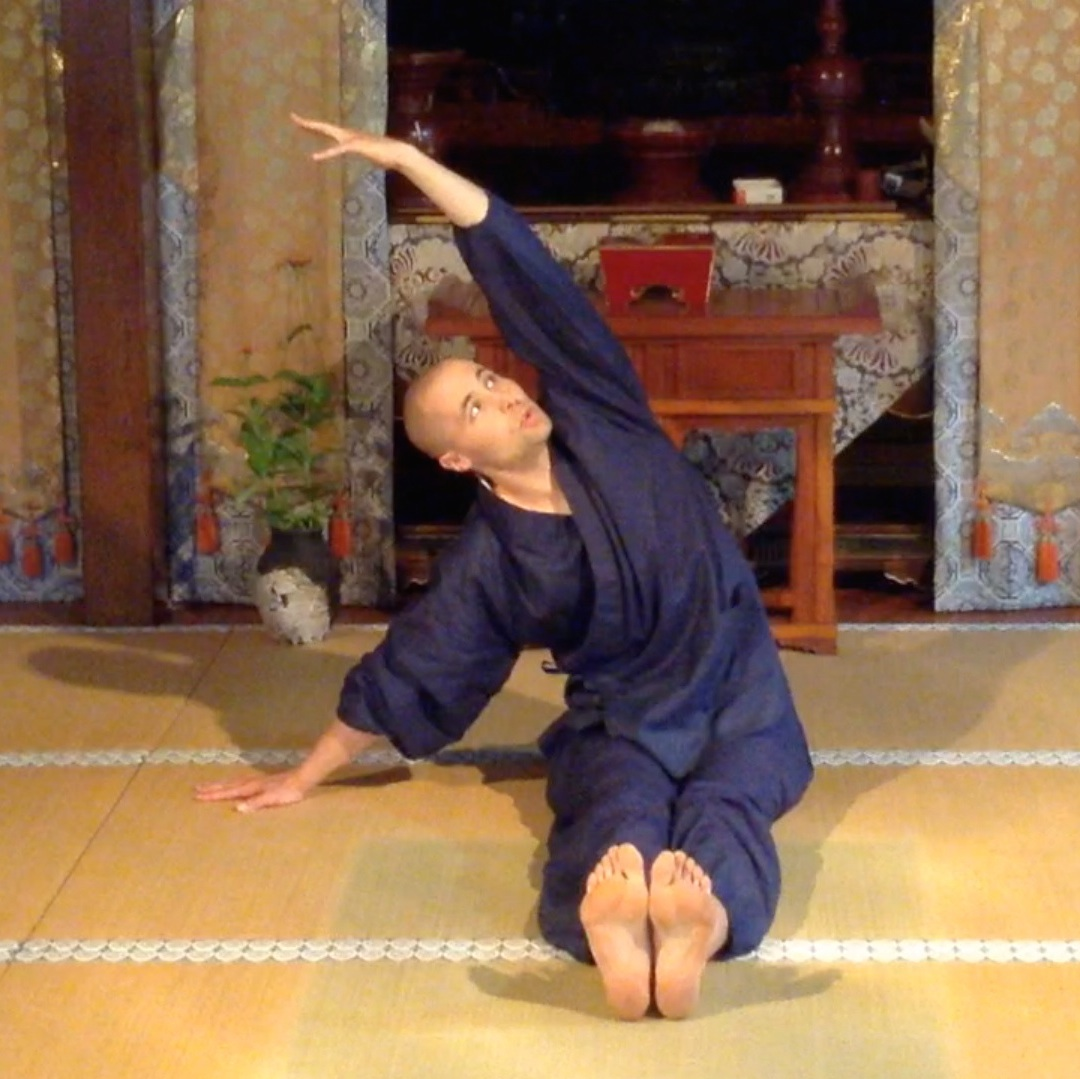
Matt Shinkai Kane teaching Zen Taiso at Gyokuryuji temple, Japan

Zen Yoga refers to a blend of yoga and Zen practices, as taught by several modern teachers.

Aaron Hoopes combines the different philosophies of various Eastern health and fitness traditions, creating this form of yoga to increase accessibility to people who are less athletic. The philosophies of yoga, qigong, and tai-chi are combined to help increase flexibility, improve the flow of breathing, and open joints. The philosophy of Zen is incorporated through being mindfully aware of the present moment. The basic principle of Zen Yoga is that simple breathing, movement and stretching exercises are available to anyone regardless of age, fitness, or health.

Oki-do yoga, which was developed by Japanese master Oki Masahiro (1921–1985) based on "Indian Yoga, the Chinese Yin-Yang principles and the Japanese Zen tradition," is also referred to as Zen Yoga.

The Zenway Sangha, a lay Rinzai organisation founded by Shinzan Miyamae, has integrated yoga practices in their teachings. According to Zenway teacher Julian Skinner, Zen practice in general, and Zen Yoga in particular, emphasize three intertwined areas – physical alignment, the flow of energy in the body and awareness or mindfulness (Japanese “nen” 念).

The Zenyoga association in Croatia founded by Žarko Andričević and his senior students offers a combination of Zen and yoga. International affiliates include groups in Celje (Slovenia), Berlin (Germany) and Cape Cod (USA).
