= Shinzan Miyamae Roshi =

Japanese Zen Buddhist (1935–2021)

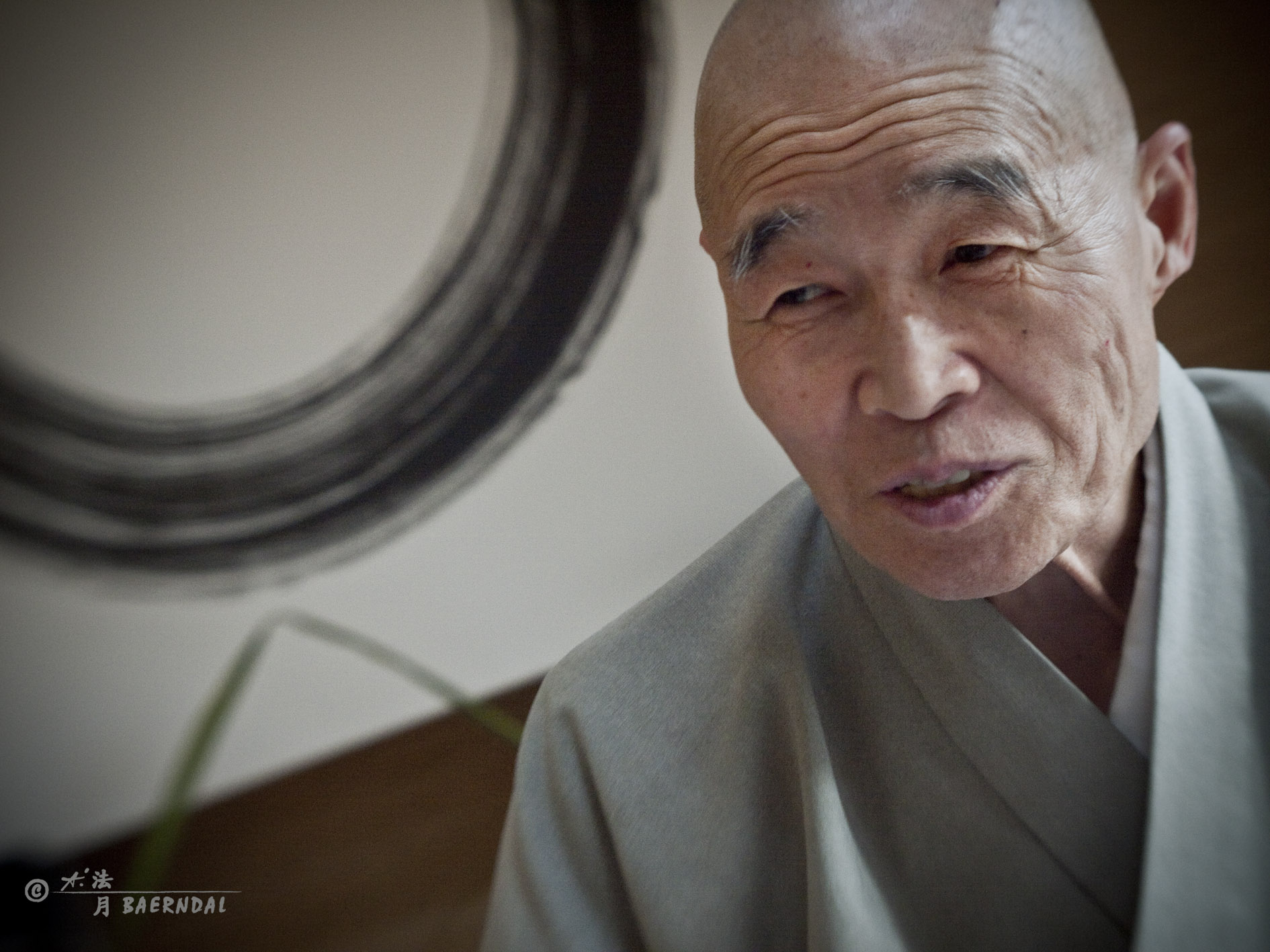
- Title: Rōshi

Personal life
- Born: Junichi Miyamae; 1935 Niigata, Japan
- Died: 2021 (aged 85–86)

Religious life
- Religion: Zen Buddhism
- School: Rinzai (Zendo Kyodan)
- Lineage: Inzan
- Dharma name: Shinzan

Senior posting
- Students: Ven. Geshin Unsan, John Wittmayer (Shinko Jion) Melody Cornell Eshin Roshi (Shinzan’s dharma heir), Julian Daizan Skinner Rōshi, Matt Shinkai Kane, Barbara Jikai Gabrys, Tomio Yugaku Ameku

Shinzan Miyamae (宮前 心山, 1935–2021) was a Japanese Rinzai Zen Buddhist rōshi (teacher). He restored Gyokuryuji, the hermitage of Edo-period Zen Master Bankei Yotaku Zenji in Gifu, Japan and taught there from 1990 to his death.

== Biography ==
Miyamae was born Niigata, Japan, in 1935. He obtained an economics degree from Doshisha University with a degree in economics, and after a failed business and suicidal thoughts turned to religion was later ordained a Zen monk by Mitsui Daishin Rōshi (1903–1992).

Later he founded Zendo Kyodan (禅道教団 – Zenways Sangha), a primarily lay-based Rinzai organization and restored Gyokuryuji, the hermitage of Bankei Yōtaku (1622–1693) with the intention of focusing on what he believed to be the true orientation of the Rinzai School, the development of spiritual insight.

The Buddhist establishment in Japan considers him a maverick over his willingness to teach former members of the Doomsday Cult Aum Shinrikyo

Long critical over the system of charges for funerals that help to support Rinzai temples and train monks, by mutual agreement with Myoshinji, he withdrew from the Myoshinji branch of the Rinzai Zen sect in 2005 and taught as an independent monk. In May 2007 he named Julian Daizan Skinner Rōshi as a teacher, presenting him with inka In November 2009 he named Melody Cornell Eshin Rōshi as a teacher and in June 2017 he also named Matt Shinkai Kane as a teacher, presenting them both with inka (transmission). In May 2018 he confirmed his Dharma transmission to Tomio Yugaku Ameku and Barbara Jikai Gabrys, naming them both as a teacher and presenting them with inka.

Roshi died in Japan in 2021.
