= Environmental Law Alliance Worldwide =

US-based non-profit organization

- Abbreviation: ELAW
- Formation: 1989
- Founded at: Eugene, Oregon
- Type: nonprofit organization legal organization
- Purpose: environment and public health
- Website: elaw.org

The Environmental Law Alliance Worldwide (ELAW) is a public interest, nonprofit, environmental organization that helps communities protect the environment and public health through law. ELAW helps partners strengthen and enforce laws to protect themselves and their communities from toxic pollution and environmental degradation. ELAW provides legal and scientific tools and support that local advocates need to challenge environmental abuses.

== History ==
ELAW was founded in 1989 by lawyers from Australia, Canada, Chile, Ecuador, Indonesia, Malaysia, Peru, the Philippines, Sri Lanka, and the United States. The founders were gathered at the University of Oregon's Public Interest Environmental Law Conference. ELAW's U.S. office is in Eugene, Oregon.

== Grants ==
ELAW has received grants from the MacArthur Foundation and the Charles Stewart Mott Foundation for projects in conservation and sustainable development.

== See also ==
- Biodiversity
- Sustainability
