= Foreign trade of Communist Czechoslovakia =

Foreign trade played an important role in the national economy of Communist Czechoslovakia as opposed to the economic system of the Soviet Union.

== History and timeline ==
=== 1948–1953 ===
After the 1948 coup d'état, foreign trade enterprises successfully carried out the government's policy of rapidly redirecting the bulk of the country's foreign trade to communist states in the period from 1948 to 1953.

Many observers contended, however, that the new system had seriously adverse effects on the economy. Isolating domestic producers of export products—primarily manufactured goods—from developments abroad slowed the introduction of new technology, the upgrading of the appearance of products, and the development of sales and service staffs with adequate parts inventories. Isolation hampered the development of export industries and products, reinforcing the autarkic bias of the Soviet model.

=== 1953–1960 ===
After Joseph Stalin's death in 1953, Czechoslovak trade with the Western world gradually revived, although it still was far below prewar levels. More than two-thirds of the foreign trade continued to be with Comecon member states. Because of its relatively advanced industrial position within Comecon, Czechoslovakia initially had a secure market for its machinery and equipment exports. As years passed, however, the Soviet Union absorbed growing portions of Czechoslovakia's export capacity and very soon the country came to depend on the Soviet Union for imports of raw materials as well.

=== 1960–1980 ===
By the 1960s, it became clear that the country's dependence on foreign trade was substantial and that a restructuring of the economy was necessary.

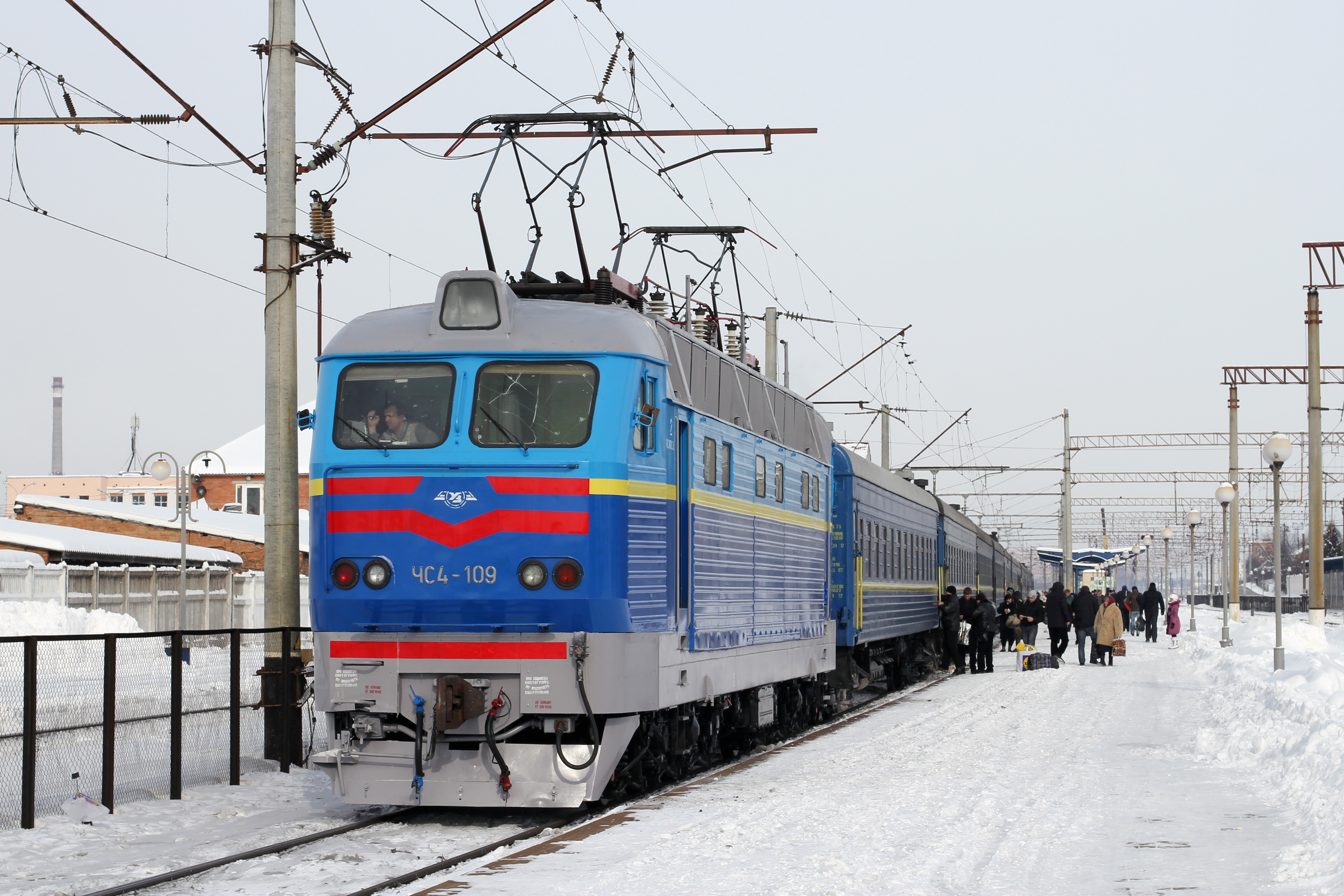
Škoda Works ChS4, built in 1969, is an example of a locomotive exported to the Soviet Union and still used in modern Ukraine.

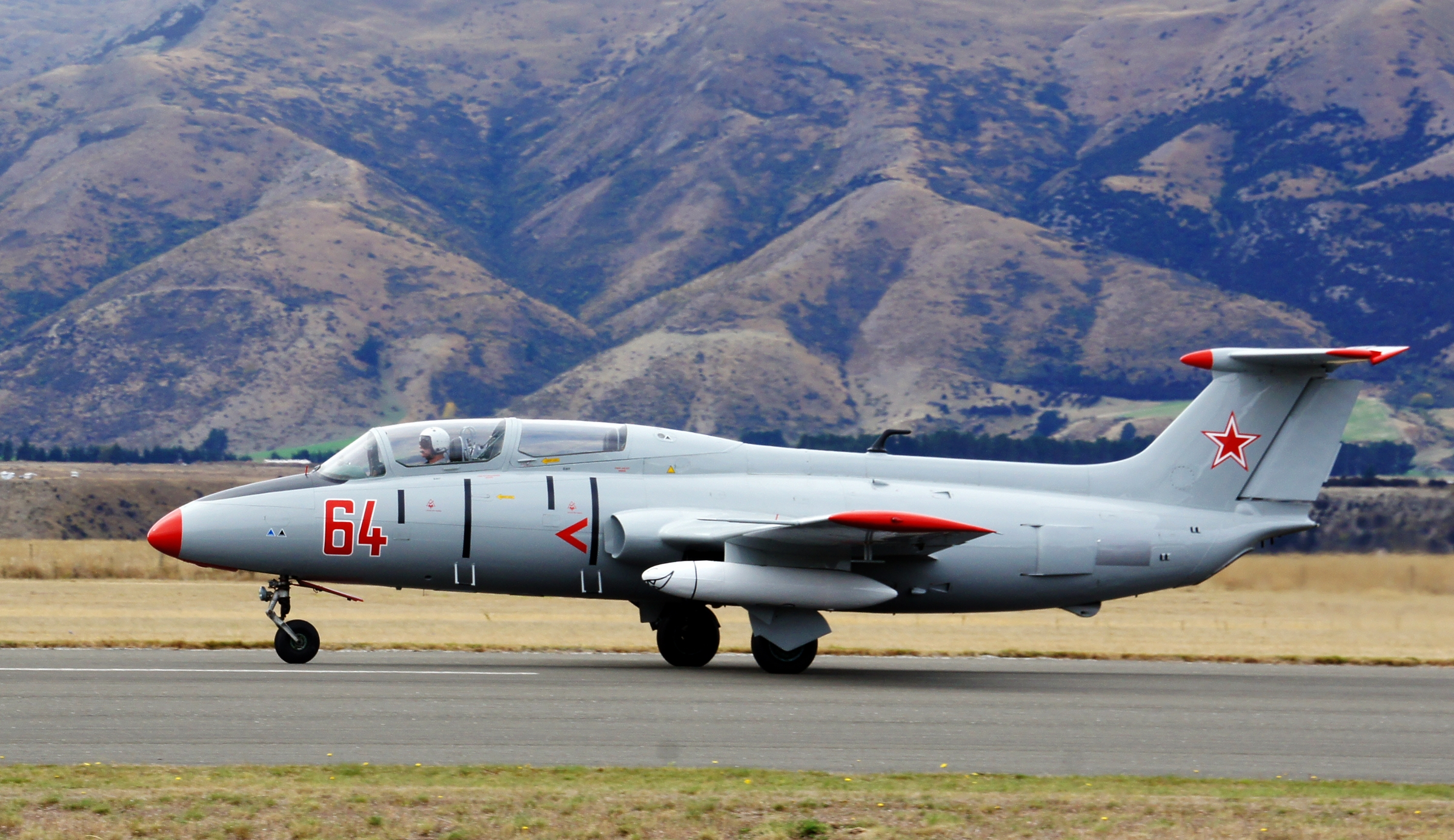
Aero L-29 Delfín became the standard jet trainer for the air forces of Warsaw Pact nations in the 1960s.

In the 1970s, the government authorized a number of large enterprises to deal directly, or through affiliations with Czechoslovak foreign trade companies, with foreign purchasers of their products. To encourage further export and modernization, the central authorities permitted Czechoslovak firms to retain a regulated portion of export proceeds. Authorities also acknowledged that the economy seriously lagged behind the non-communist industrialized countries in application of new technologies. In response, they increased imports of Western products and processes that incorporated advanced technology.

In the mid-1970s, the terms of trade for Czechoslovakia began to deteriorate rapidly. In 1975 the pricing system used to set values on imports and exports in trade between communist countries was adjusted to make them more current and closer to world prices. The adjustment raised the price of fuels and raw materials (primarily Czechoslovak imports) much more than it did manufactured goods (the country's main export). The same trend manifested itself in trade with Western industrialized countries.

During the late 1970s, the terms of trade continued to worsen; greater and greater quantities of exports were required to purchase the same volume of imports. The combination of worsening terms of trade and the difficulty of expanding exports caused Czechoslovakia's trade imbalance to grow in almost every area. Between 1975 and 1979, the country's excess of imports over exports was nearly US$1.2 billion with the Soviet Union, US$690 million with Eastern Europe, and US$3.3 billion with noncommunist developed countries. These imbalances emerged despite efforts to conserve fuel and raw material use, to slow the volume of other imports, and to increase exports.

During the 1970s, Czechoslovakia, like other countries of Eastern Europe, turned to West European credit sources to obtain financial help for imports as well as longer-term investments in modern technology.

Czechoslovakia did not publish information on these credits. However, one Western estimate placed Czechoslovakia's hard currency debt to the West at the end of 1979 at US$4 billion gross and about US$3.1 billion net. Czechoslovak officials had been much more prudent in building up a foreign currency debt than had several other East European nations, however, and the country's credit standing remained good.

=== 1980–1991 ===
Beginning in 1980, Czechoslovakia was able to achieve a trade surplus with non-communist countries, but only by drastically curtailing imports. When Western banks tightened credit to Eastern Europe in 1982 (largely in reaction to Polish insolvency), Czechoslovakia redoubled its efforts to curb imports and pay off its debt. This cautious attitude continued to prevail even after the creditors' policy eased. The government's stance did have the disadvantage of depriving Czechoslovakia of potentially helpful Western technology.

However, at the end of 1984, Czechoslovakia could boast one of the lowest net hard currency debts per capita (about US$15 per inhabitant) in Eastern Europe; only Bulgaria's debt was lower. With the Soviet Union, by contrast, Czechoslovakia continued to run a substantial deficit.

In the mid-1980s, according to official statistics, Czechoslovak trade activities remained overwhelmingly oriented toward intra-Comecon trade. Within Comecon, in keeping with the plan for regional specialization set forth in the Comprehensive Program of 1971, Czechoslovakia concentrated on production of machine tools and electric railroad locomotives; the traditionally strong Czechoslovak armaments industry also remained important. In 1985, almost 78% of total Czechoslovak foreign trade turnover was with Comecon members. Trade with "developed capitalist countries", by contrast, was listed at just under 16% and developing countries accounted for over 6%.

Most Western analysts believed that official Czechoslovak methods of calculation tended to overstate considerably the value of trade conducted in transferable rubles, i.e., with Comecon partners, and to underestimate the value of hard currency trade with non-communist countries. Nevertheless, the general structure of Czechoslovakia's foreign trade was unmistakable.

== Organization ==
Under the Czechoslovak system, foreign trade was a state monopoly, supervised by the central Ministry of Foreign Trade. The ministry oversaw the operation of about thirty foreign trade enterprises. As intermediaries between the domestic export producers or import purchasers and the external market, the enterprises were responsible for arranging contracts as well as for financing and generally supervising Czechoslovak foreign trade, usually setting prices that have little connection with domestic production factors.

The foreign trade companies bought Czechoslovak goods for export at domestic prices and sold foreign goods to Czechoslovak customers at domestic prices; but the other half of these transactions, involving actual foreign trade, took place in foreign currencies in foreign markets. The government budget then made adjustments to compensate for any unwanted gains and losses caused by varying foreign and domestic prices.

=== Foreign exchange and exchange rate ===
An important characteristic of the Soviet model that was imposed on Czechoslovakia in 1948 was the attempt to insulate the domestic economy and minimize the impact of world economic trends. The system accomplished this in part by severely restricting foreign currency transactions and confining them to official channels at fixed and favorable exchange rates. Within a few years, the exchange rate had lost its historical basis and no longer bore any direct relationship to purchasing power in other currencies.

=== Trade partners ===
==== Major partners ====
Czechoslovak trade was heavily concentrated among a relatively small group of countries. According to official statistics, five countries accounted for 71.7% of all foreign trade in 1985:

1. Soviet Union
2. East Germany (East Germany)
3. Poland
4. Hungary
5. Germany (West Germany)

The Soviet Union exerted a powerful influence over the Czechoslovak economy. In 1985 it accounted for 44.8% of foreign trade turnover, according to official statistics.

In 1985 by far the most important export from Czechoslovakia to the Soviet Union was machinery and various kinds of equipment, such as machine tools, power generating equipment, instruments and laboratory equipment, agricultural machinery, railroad rolling stock and other transport equipment, and equipment for the food, textile, and chemical industries. Such items made up over 60% of exports to the Soviet Union.

Other minor items were ores and metals, clothing and footwear, chemicals, furniture, domestic appliances, and beverages. Czechoslovak imports from the Soviet Union, by contrast, consisted primarily of raw materials and energy-related items; petroleum and petroleum products accounted for almost 43% of import value, and natural gas and electricity totaled 18%. Other imported products were machinery and transport equipment, representing almost 10% of total imports; metal ores, coal and coke, and pig iron and ferroalloys made up almost 8%. Second, third, and fourth in order of rank in Czechoslovak foreign trade turnover were East Germany, Poland, and Hungary.

Among noncommunist countries, an important trade partner was West Germany (fifth in rank). Principal Czechoslovak exports to West Germany in 1985 were various manufactured goods (especially paper and paperboard, textiles, and iron and steel products), mineral fuel products (briquettes, coke, and refined petroleum products), and chemical products. Principal imports from West Germany were machinery (textile- and leather-working machinery, machine tools, and electrical machinery and instruments), chemical products, and various manufactured goods.

==== Other partners ====
Other East European Comecon countries, such as Bulgaria, Romania and Hungary, were also of considerable importance (seventh and ninth in rank, respectively). Czechoslovak exports to these countries in 1985, according to official data, consisted mainly of machinery and transport equipment, chemical products, and (especially to Hungary) coal and briquettes. Imports likewise were primarily machinery and transport equipment, chemical products, and various other manufactured goods. Czechoslovakia also imported food and animal products from Hungary.

Other significant trading partners were Austria, Britain, Italy, and France. Engineering products, which accounted for more than 50% of all Czechoslovak exports, had a share of only 10 to 11% in noncommunist trade, owing to very strong and successful West European competition. Instead, consumer goods, metallurgical products, chemicals, and fuels and raw materials were more important. With regard to imports from noncommunist countries, Czechoslovakia in 1986 was especially interested in the high technology offered by Western Europe and Japan (twenty-fifth in rank). Particularly in demand were products from engineering, electronics, and electrical engineering industries, as well as biotechnology and pharmaceuticals. As of 1985, Czechoslovakia also conducted substantial amounts of trade with Yugoslavia, the People's Republic of China, Syria, and Cuba.

Czechoslovak trade with the United States (twenty-third in rank) was modest. In 1985 Czechoslovak exports to the United States included, among other things, footwear and jewelry, glassware, steel bars, wire, shaped steel, prepared or preserved meats, and hops. In 1985 imports consisted, among other things, of raw materials (hides and skins, seeds for producing vegetable oil, and ores and concentrates of base metals), specialized industrial machinery, and printed materials.

During the late 1970s and early 1980s, Czechoslovakia had imported substantial amounts of grain from the United States, but more abundant domestic harvests enabled the country to reduce these imports in the mid-1980s.
