= Czechoslovak Socialist Republic =

State in Europe from 1948 to 1989

Czechoslovak Republic (1948–1960) Československá republika Czechoslovak Socialist Republic (1960–1990) Československá socialistická republika
- 1948–1990
- Flag Coat of arms (1960–1990)
- Motto: Pravda vítězí / Pravda víťazí "Truth prevails"
- Anthem: 'Kde domov můj' (Czech) 'Where My Home Is' 'Nad Tatrou sa blýska' (Slovak) 'Lightning Over the Tatras'
- The Czechoslovak Socialist Republic in 1989
- Status: Satellite state of the Soviet Union (until 1989) and member of the Warsaw Pact and Comecon
- Capital and largest city: Prague; 50°05′N 14°25′E
- Official languages: Czech; Slovak
- Religion: Roman Catholicism (de facto); State atheism (de jure since the 1960 Constitution); Secular state (de jure until the 1960 Constitution )
- Demonym: Czechoslovak
- Government: Communist state (Note: Unitary state until the 1969 Federation Law, establishing a federal state consisting of a Czech and a Slovak republic.)
- De facto ruler
  - 1948–1953: Klement Gottwald
  - 1953–1968: Antonín Novotný
  - 1968–1969: Alexander Dubček
  - 1969–1987: Gustáv Husák
  - 1987–1989: Miloš Jakeš
  - 1989: Karel Urbánek
- President
  - 1948–1953 (first): Klement Gottwald
  - 1989–1990 (last): Václav Havel
- Prime Minister
  - 1948–1953 (first): Antonín Zápotocký
  - 1989–1990 (last): Marián Čalfa
- Legislature: National Assembly (1948–1969); Federal Assembly (1969–1990)
- Historical era: Cold War
  - Coup d'état: 25 February 1948
  - Ninth-of-May Constitution: 9 May 1948
  - CSSR established: 11 July 1960
  - Warsaw Pact invasion: 21 August 1968
  - Federation law: 1 January 1969
  - Velvet Revolution: 24 November 1989
  - Constitutional amendment: 23 April 1990
  - End of the Government of National Understanding: 27 June 1990

Area
  - Total: 127,900 km^{2} (49,400 sq mi)

Population
  - 1986 estimate: 15,600,000
- HDI (1990 formula): 0.931 very high
- Currency: Czechoslovak koruna (Kčs)
- Calling code: 42
- ISO 3166 code: CS
- Internet TLD: .cs
Preceded by	Succeeded by
Third Czechoslovak Republic	Czech and Slovak Federative Republic
- Today part of: Czech Republic; Slovakia
- a. All permanent non-Soviet members of the Warsaw Pact, except Romania, were "European colonies".

The Czechoslovak Socialist Republic (Note: Czech and Slovak: (Československá socialistická republika, ČSSR)) (known from 1948 to 1960 as the Czechoslovak Republic (Note: Czech and Slovak: Československá republika)), Fourth Czechoslovak Republic, or simply Czechoslovakia, was the Czechoslovak state from 1948 until 1989, when the country was under communist rule, and was regarded as a satellite state in the Soviet sphere of interest.

Following the coup d'état of February 1948, when the Communist Party of Czechoslovakia seized power with the support of the Soviet Union, the country was declared a "people's democratic state" when the Ninth-of-May Constitution became effective. The traditional name Československá republika (Czechoslovak Republic), along with several other state symbols, were changed on 11 July 1960 following the implementation of the 1960 Constitution of Czechoslovakia as a symbol of the "final victory of socialism" in the country.

In April 1990, shortly after the Velvet Revolution, the Czechoslovak Socialist Republic was renamed to the Czech and Slovak Federative Republic. On 10 December 1989, the National Government of Understanding was established with Marián Čalfa as Prime Minister, replacing a Ladislav Adamec led communist government, with a cabinet in which the Communist Party of Czechoslovakia held 10 of 21 seats, compared with the 15 of 20 seats they had held in the previous cabinet. The Communist Party continued to hold a strong plurality in government until democratic elections in June 1990 where the Civic Forum claimed victory, and a new government was formed on 27 June by Prime Minister Čalfa which led the government until its end.

== Name ==
The official name of the country was the Czechoslovak Socialist Republic. The name also means "Land of the Czechs and Slovaks" while Latinised from the country's original name – "the Czechoslovak Nation" – upon independence in 1918, from the Czech endonym Češi – via its Polish orthography.

The name "Czech" derives from the Czech endonym Češi via Polish, from the archaic Czech Čechové, originally the name of the West Slavic tribe whose Přemyslid dynasty subdued its neighbors in Bohemia around AD 900. Its further etymology is disputed. The traditional etymology derives it from an eponymous leader Čech who led the tribe into Bohemia. Modern theories consider it an obscure derivative, e.g. from četa, a medieval military unit. Meanwhile, the name "Slovak" was taken from the Slovaks. During the state's existence, it was simply referred to "Czechoslovakia", or sometimes the "ČSSR" and "ČSR" for short.

== History ==
=== Background ===
Before the Prague Offensive in 1945, Edvard Beneš, the Czechoslovak leader, agreed to Soviet leader Joseph Stalin's demands for unconditional agreement with Soviet foreign policy and the Beneš decrees. While Beneš was not a Moscow cadre and several domestic reforms of other Eastern Bloc countries were not part of Beneš's plan, Stalin did not object because the plan included property expropriation and he was satisfied with the relative strength of communists in Czechoslovakia compared to other Eastern Bloc countries.

In April 1945, the Third Republic was formed, led by a National Front of six parties. Because of the Communist Party's strength and Beneš's loyalty, unlike in other Central and Eastern European countries, USSR did not require Eastern Bloc politics or "reliable" cadres in Czechoslovak power positions, and the executive and legislative organs retained their traditional structures. The Communists were the big winners in the 1946 elections, taking a total of 114 seats (they ran a separate list in Slovakia). Thereafter, the Soviet Union was disappointed that the government failed to eliminate "bourgeois" influence in the army, expropriate industrialists and large landowners and eliminate parties outside of the "National Front". Hope in Moscow was waning for a Communist victory in the 1948 elections following a May 1947 Kremlin report concluding that "reactionary elements" praising Western democracy had strengthened.

Following Czechoslovakia's brief consideration of taking Marshall Plan funds, and the subsequent scolding of Communist parties by the Cominform at Szklarska Poręba in September 1947, Rudolf Slánský returned to Prague with a plan for the final seizure of power. Thereafter, Soviet Ambassador Valerian Zorin arranged a communist coup d'état, followed by the occupation of non-Communist ministers' ministries, while the army was confined to barracks.

On 25 February 1948, Beneš, fearful of civil war and Soviet intervention, capitulated and appointed a Communist-dominated government who was sworn in two days later. Although members of the other National Front parties still nominally figured, this was, for all intents and purposes, the start of out-and-out Communist rule in the country. Foreign Minister Jan Masaryk, the only prominent Minister still left who was not either a Communist or fellow traveler, was found dead two weeks later. On 30 May, a single list of candidates from the National Front, which became an organization dominated by the Communist Party, was elected to the National Assembly.

=== Czechoslovak Republic (1948–1960) ===
After the passage of the Ninth-of-May Constitution on 9 June 1948, the country was reconstituted as a "people's democratic state." Although the Ninth-of-May Constitution was superficially similar to the 1920 independence constitution, it was close enough to the 1936 Soviet Constitution that Beneš refused to sign it. He had resigned a week before it was finally ratified, and died in September. The Ninth-of-May Constitution confirmed that the KSČ possessed absolute power, as other Communist parties had in the Eastern Bloc. On 11 July 1960, the 1960 Constitution of Czechoslovakia was promulgated, changing the name of the country from the "Czechoslovak Republic" to the "Czechoslovak Socialist Republic". It declared Czechoslovakia to be a socialist state, codifying the actual state of affairs since 1948.

=== 1968–1990 ===
In 20–21 August 1968 the Czechoslovak Socialist Republic was jointly invaded by the Soviet Union and Warsaw Pact. The invasion stopped Alexander Dubček's Prague Spring liberalisation reforms and strengthened the authoritarian wing of the Communist Party of Czechoslovakia (KSČ).

Except the Prague Spring in the late-1960s, Czechoslovakia was characterized by the absence of democracy and competitiveness of its Western European counterparts as part of the Cold War. In 1969, the country became a federative republic comprising the Czech Socialist Republic and Slovak Socialist Republic.

Under the federation, social and economic inequities between the Czech and Slovak halves of the country were largely eliminated. Several ministries, such as Education, were formally transferred to the two republics. The centralized political control of the Communist Party severely limited the effects of federalization.

The 1970s saw the rise of the dissident movement in Czechoslovakia, represented (among others) by Václav Havel. The movement sought greater political participation and expression in the face of official disapproval, making itself felt by limits on work activities (up to a ban on any professional employment and refusal of higher education to the dissident's children), police harassment and even prison time.

In late 1989, the Velvet Revolution forced the Communist leadership to resign. On 30 November, Czechoslovakia became a liberal democracy once again when the Federal Assembly deleted the provisions of the Constitution giving the Communist Party a monopoly of power. Further amendments purged the document of its Communist character and phrasing so it could remain in force pending a completely new constitution. However, in late 1992, after further rifts between the Czechs and Slovaks proved insurmountable, the Federal Assembly decided it would break up the country into the Czech Republic and Slovakia on 1 January 1993.

== Geography ==
The Czechoslovak Socialist Republic was bounded on the west by West Germany and East Germany, on the north by Polish People's Republic, on the east by the Soviet Union (via the Ukrainian SSR) and on the south by Hungary and Austria.

== Politics ==
The Communist Party of Czechoslovakia (KSČ) led initially by Chairman Klement Gottwald, held a monopoly on politics. Following the 1948 Tito–Stalin split, increased party purges occurred throughout the Eastern Bloc, including a purge of 550,000 party members of the KSČ, 30% of its members.

The evolution of the resulting harshness of purges in Czechoslovakia, like much of its history after 1948, was a function of the late takeover by the communists, with many of the purges focusing on the sizable numbers of party members with prior memberships in other parties. The purges accompanied various show trials, including those of Rudolf Slánský, Vladimír Clementis, Ladislav Novomeský and Gustáv Husák (Clementis was later executed). Slánský and eleven others were convicted together of being "Trotskyist-zionist-titoist-bourgeois-nationalist traitors" in one series of show trials, after which they were executed and their ashes were mixed with material being used to fill roads on the outskirts of Prague.

Antonín Novotný served as First Secretary of the KSČ from 1953 to 1968. Gustáv Husák was elected first secretary of KSČ in 1969 (changed to General Secretary in 1971) and president of Czechoslovakia in 1975. Other parties and organizations existed but functioned in subordinate roles to KSČ. All political parties, as well as numerous mass organizations, were grouped under the umbrella of National Front of the Czechoslovak Socialist Republic. Human rights activists and religious activists were severely repressed.

In terms of political appointments, the KSČ maintained cadre and nomenklatura lists, with the latter containing every post that was important to the smooth application of party policy, including military posts, administrative positions, directors of local enterprises, social organization administrators, newspapers, etc. The KSČ's nomenklatura lists were thought to contain 100,000 post listings. The names of those that the party considered to be trustworthy enough to secure a nomenklatura post were compiled on the cadre list.

During the Communist period, the country was part of the Iron Curtain. Emigration without permission was banned, and people could be shot while trying to escape.

Despite the Constitutional Act on the Czechoslovak Federation establishing federalism within Czechoslovakia, it was still de facto centralised by the central communist party.

=== Leader of the Communist Party ===
Flag of the Communist Party of Czechoslovakia. After February 1948, the Communist Party became the only autonomous political entity in the country.

The Party leader of the KSČ was besides his party affairs also the de facto leader of the country.

=== Foreign relations ===
Communist Czechoslovakia was an active participant in the Council for Mutual Economic Assistance (Comecon), Warsaw Pact, the UN and its specialized agencies, and Non-Aligned Movement; it was a signatory of conference on Security and Cooperation in Europe.

=== Administrative divisions ===
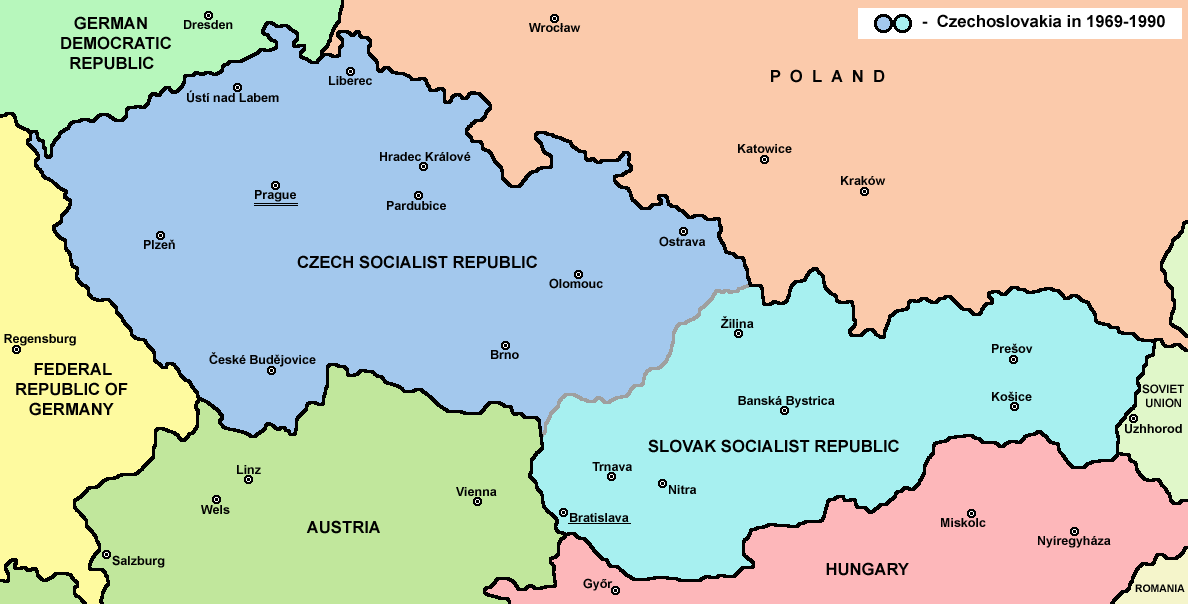
Czechoslovakia in 1969

- 1960–1992: 10 regions (kraje), Prague, and (since 1970) Bratislava; divided in 109–114 districts (Okresy); the kraje were abolished temporarily in Slovakia in 1969–1970 and for many functions since 1991 in Czechoslovakia; in addition, the two internal republics, the Czech Socialist Republic, and Slovak Socialist Republic, were established in 1969.

== Economy ==
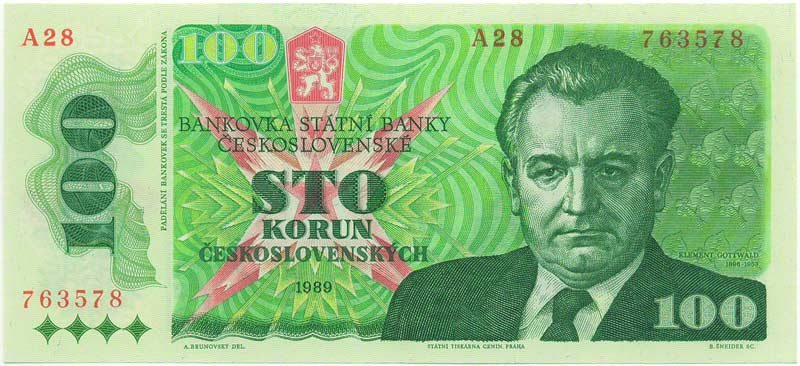
Obverse of the 100 Kčs banknote of the State Bank of Czechoslovakia dated 1989

The CSSR's economy was a centrally planned command economy with links controlled by the communist party, similar to the Soviet Union. It had a large metallurgical industry, but was dependent on imports for iron and nonferrous ores. Like the rest of the Eastern Bloc, producer goods were favored over consumer goods, and as a result consumer goods were lacking in quantity and quality. This resulted in a shortage economy. Economic growth rates lagged well behind Czechoslovakia's western European counterparts. Investments made in industry did not yield the results expected, and consumption of energy and raw materials was excessive. Czechoslovak leaders themselves decried the economy's failure to modernize with sufficient speed.

In the 1950s, Czechoslovakia experienced high economic growth (averaging 7% per year), which allowed for a substantial increase in wages and living standards, thus promoting the stability of the regime.

- Industry: extractive and manufacturing industries dominated this sector. Major branches included machinery, chemicals, food processing, metallurgy, and textiles. Industry was wasteful of energy, materials, and labor and slow to upgrade technology, but was a source of high-quality machinery and arms for other communist countries.
- Agriculture: minor sector but supplied bulk of domestic food needs. Dependent on large imports of grains (mainly for livestock feed) in years of adverse weather. Meat production constrained by shortage of feed, but high per capita consumption of meat.
- Foreign Trade: exports estimated at US$17.8 billion in 1985, of which 55% was machinery, 14% fuels and materials, and 16% manufactured consumer goods. Imports at estimated US$17.9 billion in 1985, of which 41% was fuels and materials, 33% machinery, and 12% agricultural and forestry products. In 1986, about 80% of foreign trade was with communist countries.
- Exchange Rate: the official, or commercial, rate was Kcs 5.4 per US$1 in 1987, whereas the tourist, or noncommercial, rate was Kcs 10.5 per US$1. Neither rate reflected purchasing power. The exchange rate on the black market was around Kcs 30 per US$1, and this rate would become official once the currency became convertible in the early 1990s.
- Fiscal Year: calendar year.
- Fiscal Policy: state almost exclusive owner of means of production. Revenues from state enterprises primary source of revenues followed by turnover tax. Large budget expenditures on social programs, subsidies, and investments. Budget usually balanced or small surplus.

=== Resource base ===
After World War II, the country was short on energy, relying on imported crude oil and natural gas from the Soviet Union, domestic brown coal, and nuclear and hydroelectric energy. Energy constraints were a major factor in 1980s.

== Demographics ==
=== Society and social groups ===
Homosexuality was decriminalized in 1962.

=== Religion ===
Religion was oppressed and attacked in communist-era Czechoslovakia. In 1950 the government executed Operations K and R, intended to dismantle monastic life, confiscate ecclesiastical property and bring religious institutions under strict state control. Later during the 1950s more than 6,000 religious people (some old and sick) received prison sentences averaging more than five years apiece. Between 1948 and 1968, the number of priests declined by half, and half the remaining clergy were over sixty years of age. In 1991, 46.4% of Czechoslovaks were Roman Catholics, 29.5% were atheists, 5.3% were Evangelical Lutherans, and 16.7% were n/a, but there were huge differences between the 2 constituent republics – see Czech Republic and Slovakia.

== Culture and society ==
=== Health, social welfare and housing ===
After World War II, free health care was available to all citizens. National health planning emphasized preventive medicine; factory and local health-care centers supplemented hospitals and other inpatient institutions. Substantial improvement in rural health care occurred in the 1960s and 1970s.

=== Mass media ===
The mass media in Czechoslovakia was controlled by the Communist Party of Czechoslovakia (KSČ). Private ownership of any publication or agency of the mass media was generally forbidden, although churches and other organizations published small periodicals and newspapers. Even with this informational monopoly in the hands of organizations under KSČ control, all publications were reviewed by the government's Office for Press and Information.

== See also ==
- Government structure of Communist Czechoslovakia
- Economy of Communist Czechoslovakia
- Resource base of Communist Czechoslovakia
- Society of Communist Czechoslovakia
- Health and social welfare in Communist Czechoslovakia
- Mass media in Communist Czechoslovakia
- Prague Spring
- Captive Nations
- Czech Socialist Republic
- Slovak Socialist Republic
