= Economy of communist Czechoslovakia =

In the mid-1980s, Communist Czechoslovakia was prosperous by the standards of the Eastern Bloc, and did well in comparison to many richer western countries. Consumption of some goods like meat, eggs and bread products was even higher than the average countries in Western Europe, and the population enjoyed high macroeconomic stability and low social friction. Inhabitants of Czechoslovakia enjoyed a standard of living generally higher than that found in most other East European countries. Heavily dependent on foreign trade, the country nevertheless had one of the Eastern Bloc's smallest international debts to non-socialist countries.

The command economy of Czechoslovakia possessed serious structural problems. Like the rest of the Eastern Bloc economies, producer goods were favored over consumer goods, causing consumer goods to be lacking in quantity and quality in the shortage economy that resulted. Economic growth rates lagged well behind Czechoslovakia's western European counterparts. Investments made in industry did not yield the results expected. Consumption of energy and raw materials was excessive. Czechoslovak leaders themselves decried the economy's failure to modernize with sufficient speed.

The differing statistical concepts and procedures used by socialist and non-socialist economists make an assessment of the status of the Czechoslovak economy complicated. Foreign trade statistics are particularly difficult to assess because a variety of currency conversion methods were employed to calculate trade turnover value. Data calculated on the basis of non-socialist concepts will be identified here by the use of such Western terms as gross national product; Czechoslovak statistics will be called official data or identified by such terms as net material product or national income.

== Functioning of the economy ==
The Czechoslovak economy, like most economies in socialist countries, differed markedly from market or mixed economies. The main difference is that while in market economies, decisions by individual consumers and producers tend automatically to regulate supply and demand, consumption and investment, and other economic variables, in most communist economies, these variables are decided by a national plan that has the force of law.

In Czechoslovakia, like in most socialist countries, the centralized economic structure paralleled that of the government and the Communist Party of Czechoslovakia (Komunistická strana Československa—KSČ). This structure gave the party firm control over the government and the economy. It is generally referred to as the Soviet model and was first applied in the Soviet Union, which was initially an agrarian nation with extensive natural resources, a large internal market, and relatively little dependence on foreign trade; the goal was to quickly develop heavy industry and defense production. Czechoslovakia, by contrast, was a small country that had already reached a high level of industrialization and was rather heavily dependent on foreign trade when the Soviet system was first imposed after World War II.

In the mid-1980s, Czechoslovakia had a highly industrialized economy, a fact reflected in the 1985 official statistics concerning production of the net material product of the country (the official measure of aggregate production). The industrial sector accounted for 59.7 percent of the value of the net material product; construction, 11.2 percent; agriculture and forestry, 7.5 percent; and various other productive services (including transport, catering, and retailing, among other activities), 21.6 percent. As of 1980 the socialist sector (state enterprises or cooperatives) generated 97.4 percent of the national income. Of the total workforce, almost 99.8 percent was employed in the socialist sector.

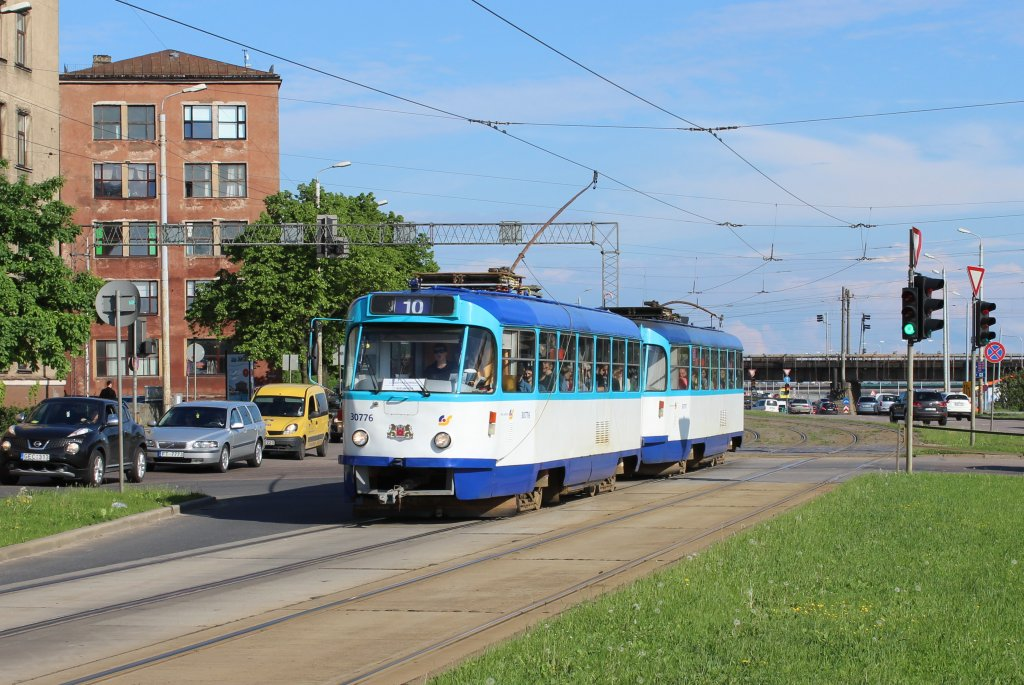
Tatra T3 by ČKD Tatra became one of the most widely produced trams in the world, exported to the Soviet Union, Germany, Yugoslavia, and Romania. Depicted here is a tram in Riga.

=== Plans and their implementation ===
Government ministries prepared general directives concerning the desired development of the economy. They passed these along to the economic advisory body, the Central Planning Commission, which in turn prepared the long-term targets of the economy. These were expressed in extensive economic plans--in general plans covering periods fifteen to twenty years into the future and in the well-known five-year plans. Since 1969, economic plans for the Czech Socialist Republic and the Slovak Socialist Republic have been produced by their own planning commissions, although the central plan remained the most important. Most significant on a daily operational basis, however, were the short-term annual production objectives. In their final form, these more detailed annual plans have the force of law, no longer being merely guides or recommendations.

In formulating the various plans, the Central Planning Commission converted the directives of the ministries into physical units, devised assignments for key sectors of the economy, and then delivered this information to the appropriate ministries, which oversee various functional branches of the economy. Upon receiving their assignments, the various ministries further subdivided the plan into tasks for the industrial enterprises and trusts or groups of enterprises under their supervision. A parallel process took place for agriculture, in which the federal Ministry of Agriculture and Food supervised the planning procedures for the collectives and state farms. Agricultural farms had been collectivized according to a process pioneered by Joseph Stalin in the late 1920s by which Marxist-Leninist regimes in the Eastern Bloc and elsewhere attempted to establish an ordered socialist system in rural agriculture. Because of the need to conceal the assumption of control and the realities of an initial lack of control, no Soviet dekulakization-style liquidation of rich peasants occurred in countries such as Czechoslovakia. Because Czechoslovakia was more industrialized than the Soviet Union, it was in a position to furnish most of the equipment and fertilizer inputs needed to ease the transition to collectivized agriculture.

The ministries provided more detailed instructions concerning fulfillment of the assignments and passed them along to the trusts and enterprises. Upon receipt of their proposed tasks, individual enterprises drew up a draft plan with the assistance of their parent trust or ministry. After receiving feedback concerning the plan, the ministries consulted again with the Central Planning Commission and, assembling all the draft plans, formulated an operational plan that could achieve the central directives. The appropriate parts of the assignments were then dispatched once again to the trusts and enterprises. This time, their acceptance by the enterprises and trusts was mandatory.

The norms included in the instructions to the enterprises usually specified the volume and kinds of production required, inputs available, a production schedule, job categories and wage rates, and a description of the centrally funded investment planned. National and republic budget levies and subsidies, profit targets and limitations, and plans for the introduction of new products and technology were also set forth in the instructions.

=== Advantages and disadvantages ===
Advocates of this centralized system of managing the economy contend that it has a number of advantages. In a centrally planned system, authorities can distribute resources and production targets as they choose, balancing the needs of consumption and investment on the basis of long-term goals. Planners in postwar Czechoslovakia, for example, were thus able to expand the country's heavy industrial base as they wished. In turn, research efforts, being centrally directed, can focus on areas deemed vital to the economy's goals. In general, central planning can make it possible for producers to take advantage of economies of scale, eliminating superfluous and wasteful activities. If planning is really effective, the system should result in virtually full employment of resources.

As critics have pointed out, however, certain aspects of the system interfere with its effective functioning. One problem is the assignment of production quotas. Planners generally must base these assignments on the past performance of enterprises. Enterprise managers, knowing that planners tend to assess enterprise performance according to completion or non-completion of assigned tasks, may be tempted to understate and misrepresent the production potential of their organizations in order to obtain an assignment they can easily handle. Also, they may have little incentive to overfulfill aspects of the current plan; such achievements might lead planners to assign a substantially more difficult or even unachievable task during the next planning period, resulting in poor performance evaluation for the enterprise. Such a disparity might call into question the validity of the information previously furnished to the planners by the enterprise managers. To ensure plan fulfillment, managers tend to exaggerate their material and labor requirements and then to hoard these inputs, especially if there is a reason to worry about punctual delivery of supplies. Furthermore, since planning under the Soviet model aims at full utilization of resources, plans are typically "taut," and an ambitious manager who seeks to obtain resources beyond those needed to achieve the plan norms may find the process difficult and discouraging, if not impossible. Given the emphasis on the fulfillment of the plan, managers may also hesitate to adopt new technology, since the introduction of a new procedure might impede operations and even jeopardize plan fulfillment. Critics have also noted that central planning of production can result in an inappropriate assortment of goods from the consumers' point of view or in low-quality production.

Producer goods were favored over consumer goods, causing consumer goods to be lacking in quantity and quality in the shortage economies that resulted. Because periodic shortages of birth control pills and intrauterine devices made these systems unreliable in Czechoslovakia, abortion became the most common form of contraception . Many premium goods could be bought only in special stores using foreign currency generally inaccessible to most citizens, such as Tuzex stores in Czechoslovakia. As a result, black markets were created that were often supplied by goods stolen from the public sector. A saying in Czechoslovakia was "if you do not steal form the state, you are robbing your own family." Private car ownership remained low by Western standards. The wait list for the distribution of Czechoslovak Škoda cars was up to 15 years.

In addition, because of large social purges, so many workers were dismissed from established professions in such purges that they often had to be replaced by hastily trained younger workers free of questionable class origins. A Czechoslovak noted:

The highly qualified professional people are laying roads, building bridges and operating machines, and the dumb clots—whose fathers used to dig, sweep or bricklay—are on top, telling the others where to lay the roads, what to produce and how to spend the country’s money. The consequence is the roads look like plowed fields, we make things we can’t sell and the bridges can’t be used for traffic…. Then they wonder why the economy is going downhill like a ten-ton lorry with the brakes off.

Like the rest of the Eastern Bloc, Czechoslovakia effectively missed the information and electronics revolution of the 1970s and 1980s. The party-state planned system ended up collapsing under the weight of accumulated economic inefficiencies, with various attempts at reform merely contributing to the acceleration of crisis-generating tendencies. It possessed poorly defined property rights, a lack of market clearing prices and overblown or distorted productive capacities in relation to analogous market economies.

=== Growth rates ===
Growth rates in Czechoslovakia, as throughout the Eastern Bloc, experienced relative decline. Meanwhile, Germany, Austria, France and other Western European nations experienced increased economic growth in the Wirtschaftswunder ("economic miracle"), Trente Glorieuses ("thirty glorious years") and the post-war boom. Overall, the inefficiency of systems without competition or market-clearing prices became costly and unsustainable, especially with the increasing complexity of world economics. While most western European economies essentially began to approach the per capita Gross Domestic Product levels of the United States, Eastern Bloc countries such as Czechoslovakia did not. Its per capita GDP fell significantly below comparable western European counterparts on an exchange basis:

Per Capita GDP (1990 $)	1938	1990
Austria	$1,800	$19,200
Czechoslovakia	$1,800	$3,100
Finland	$1,800	$26,100
Italy	$1,300	$16,800

Similar results occur for GDP on a PPP basis:

Per Capita GDP (1990 $)	1950	1973	1990
Austria	$3,706	$11,235	$16,881
Italy	$3,502	$10,643	$16,320
Czechoslovakia	$3,501	$7,041	$8,895 (Czech Republic)/ $7,762 (Slovakia)
Soviet Union	$2,834	$6,058	$6,871
Hungary	$2,480	$5,596	$6,471
Spain	$2,397	$8,739	$12,210

== History ==
=== Before socialism ===
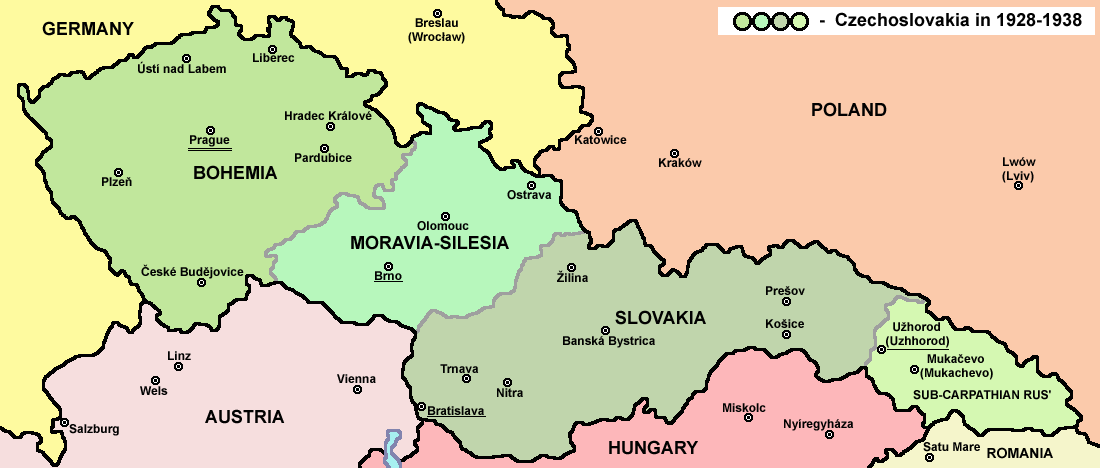
The First Republic

In 1929, compared to 1913, the gross domestic product increased by 52% and industrial production by 41%. In 1938, Czechoslovakia was in 10th place worldwide in terms of industrial production.

After World War II the Czechoslovak economy emerged relatively undamaged. Industry, which was the largest sector of the economy, included large firms in light and heavy industry. During the war, the German occupation authorities had taken over all major industrial plants. After the war, the reconstituted Czechoslovak government took control of these plants. Immediately after the war, the Soviet Union began to transfer large amounts of industrial and other assets from Eastern Bloc countries, including Czechoslovakia. In addition, the Soviets reorganized enterprises as joint-stock companies in which the Soviets possessed the controlling interest. Using that control vehicle, several enterprises were required to sell products at below Western market prices to the Soviets, such as uranium mined in Czechoslovakia.

Foreign trade was still in private hands, however, and remained important in the economy. Exports of machinery and consumer goods paid for imports of materials for processing. The quality of Czechoslovak export products was comparable to that of products produced in other industrialized countries. Agriculture also remained in private hands, and farming was still largely a family affair. The labor force as a whole was skilled and productive, and management was competent. This mixed system, containing elements of socialism and private enterprise, operated efficiently in 1947 and 1948 under a two-year plan in which goals were general and indicative rather than mandatory. The country received considerable assistance from the West through the UN, and most of its trade was with the West. Until prohibited by Stalin in 1947, Czechoslovakia intended to participate in the United States Marshall Plan to rebuild Europe. By 1948 Czechoslovak production approximated pre-war levels, with agricultural output being somewhat lower and industrial output somewhat higher than earlier levels.

=== 1948–1960 ===
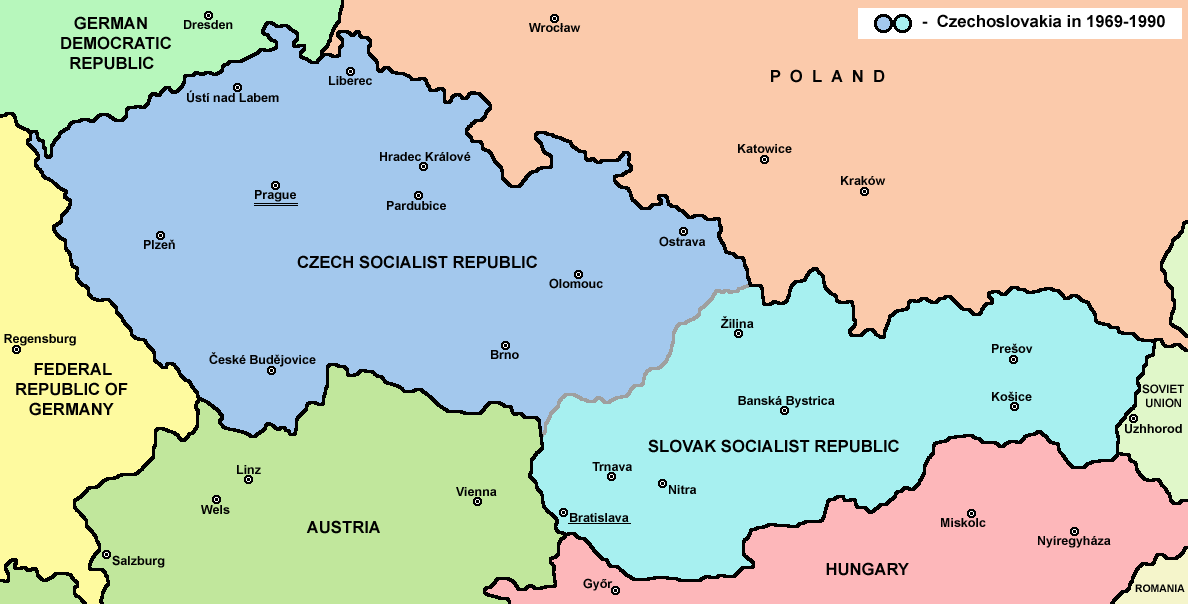
Czechoslovakia after WW II

When the KSČ assumed complete political and economic control in February 1948, it began immediately to transform the Czechoslovak economy into a miniature version of that of the Soviet Union. By 1952 the government had nationalized nearly all sectors; many experienced managers had been replaced by politically reliable individuals that sometimes had little experience in the areas they were assigned to manage. Central planning provided a mandatory guide for institutions and managers to follow in nearly all economic activity.

The targets of the First Five-Year Plan (1949–53) reflected the government's commitment to expansion of the producer goods sector of the economy. The goals were dramatically revised upwards after 1949, partly in response to the Korean War, to build up metallurgy and heavy industry. The country became an important supplier of machinery and arms to other communist countries. Foreign trade with non-communist countries dropped sharply (in part because of trade controls imposed in those countries); trade with communist countries increased from 40% of the country's total in 1948 to 70% a decade later. The economy failed to reach the ambitious goals of the first plan, although investment and growth were high. On the results of the first five-year plan, the Great Soviet Encyclopedia claims:

"The gross industrial output increased by 93 percent during the five-year plan, reaching a level more than double the 1937 output. Machine building became the leading industry, its output increasing by a factor of 3.3 over the five years. Industrial growth was especially rapid in Slovakia. At the same time, there were disproportions in the development of individual branches of the national economy, and agriculture lagged behind the growing demands of industry and the population."

By the end of the plan period, serious inflationary pressures and other imbalances had developed, requiring a currency conversion in 1953 that wiped out many people's savings and provoked outbreaks of civil disorder.

The years 1954 and 1955 were covered by yearly plans only; the scheduling change was part of an effort by the members of the Council for Mutual Economic Assistance (Comecon) to correlate and integrate their planning by using common planning periods.

The Second Five-Year Plan then encompassed the years 1956–60. During that period, investment continued at a high rate, although real wages and the supply of consumer goods also increased substantially, and national income grew by 6.9%. In the late 1950s, however, economic leaders noted that investment efforts were yielding diminishing returns. Large investments were required to sustain economic growth. In 1958 and 1959, in response to this troubling situation, the government made several relatively minor adjustments in the functioning of organizations and prices—the first of the country's economic reforms. The reforms involved some limited decentralization of authority, most notably giving enterprises more autonomy in handling investment funds. The intention was not to alter the Soviet economic model to any great extent but rather to enhance its overall operation. The reforms did not result in noticeable improvements in economic performance, however. Eventually, in 1962, planners quietly scrapped the entire reform program, reimposing most of the central controls.

On the results of the Second Five-Year Plan, the Great Soviet Encyclopedia claims:

"During the second five-year plan the industrial output increased by 66 percent, rising to four times the pre-war level (1937). The national income increased by a factor of 2.5 between 1948 and 1960. The socialist sector now owned 87.4 percent of the farmland, and the organization of farmers into cooperatives was virtually completed. Nevertheless, in terms of the growth of production, agriculture lagged behind industry. The successes of socialist construction quickly raised the living standard of the people. A national conference of the Communist Party, held on July 5–7, 1960, confirmed the victory of socialist production relations in the country. Several days later, on July 11, the National Assembly adopted a new constitution under which the country was renamed the Czechoslovak Socialist Republic (CSSR). The constitution proclaimed the CSSR a socialist state based on a firm alliance, headed by the working class, of the peasantry, the working class, and the intelligentsia."

=== 1960s ===
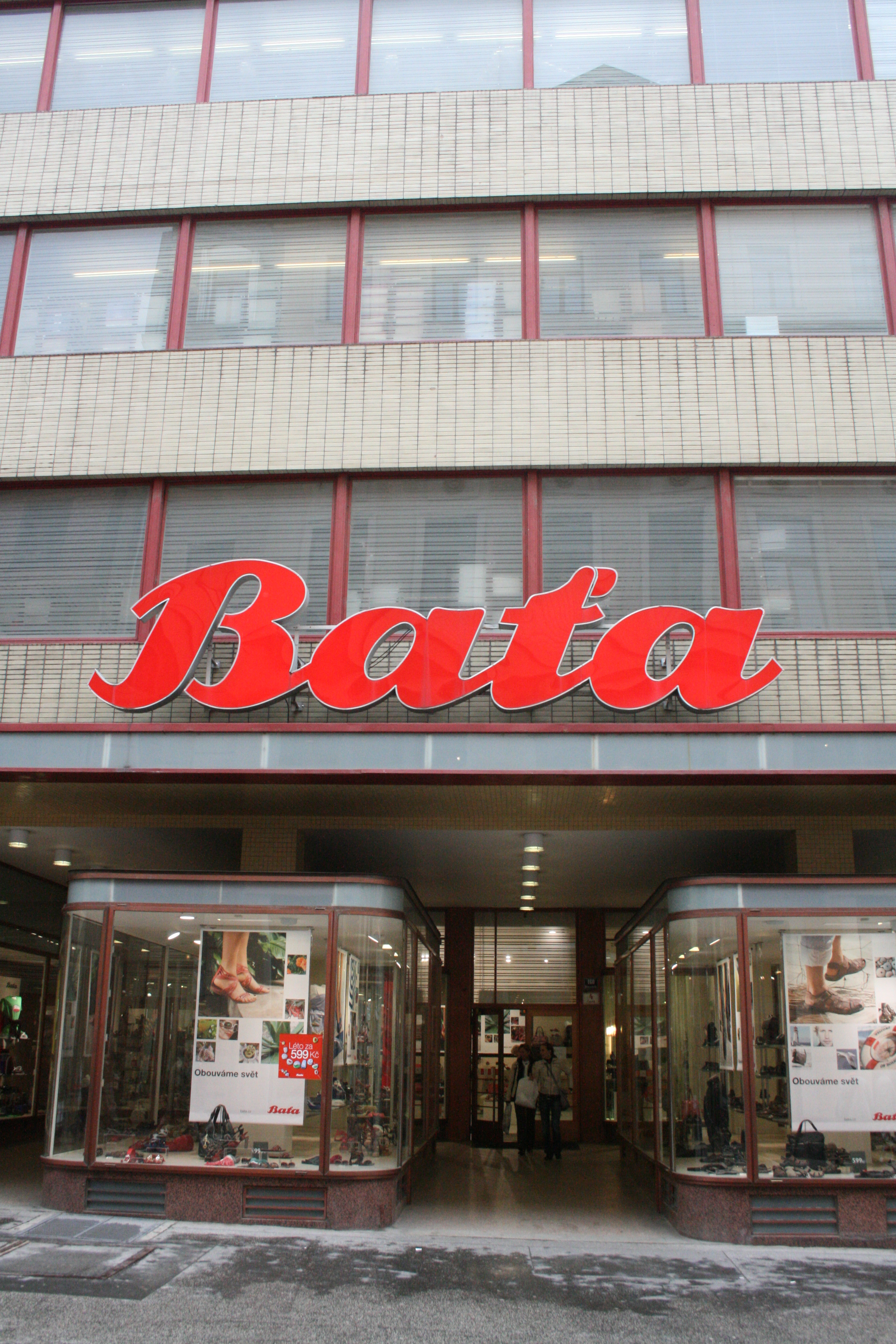
Under Tomáš Jan Baťa, the Baťa became the world's largest footwear company

During the early 1960s, industrial production stagnated and the agricultural sector also registered a relatively poor performance. Agriculture had been a weak part of the economy throughout the 1950s, consistently failing to reach planned output targets, and the minimal reforms of 1958–59 had done little to alter the situation. Targets set for the national economy in the Third Five-Year Plan (1961–65) quickly proved to be overly ambitious, particularly with regard to foreign trade. The plan was dropped after a recession in 1962, and annual plans covered the remainder of the period. National income actually declined in 1963. By 1965 it was only 1.9% higher than in 1960, in comparison with a 6.9% growth rate in the 1956–60 period.

Many factors contributed to the economy's poor performance, including adverse weather for agriculture, cancellation of orders by China resulting from the Sino-Soviet dispute, and unrealistic plan goals. By this time, however, reform-minded economists had reached the conclusion that much of the blame lay in deficiencies of the Soviet model. They began to prepare additional reform measures to improve the economy's efficiency.

Serious defects in the Soviet model for economic development had long been recognized by some Czechoslovak economists, and calls for decentralization had occurred as early as 1954. Economists and others had argued that it was inappropriate to apply the Soviet model to Czechoslovakia in a dogmatic manner, because:

- The country was already industrialized, had few natural resources and a small internal market, and remained dependent on foreign trade in significant ways.
- The model emphasized extensive development, such as building new factories, rather than intensive investment in which production processes were modernized and efficiency improved.
- The pressure for greater investment and defense production during the 1950s had caused private consumption to grow more slowly than net material product. The result had been a chronic inflationary bias, reflected in shortages of consumer goods and forced savings by the population.
- Plants and construction firms held large inventories of materials to compensate for irregular deliveries from suppliers.
- Completion of most investment projects required an inordinate amount of time, freezing funds in unproductive uses.
- Inadequate investment in agriculture had contributed to the latter's chronically poor performance.
- Prices were also a problem, based as they were on often conflicting policies; prices reflected neither scarcity nor cost, bore little rational relationship to one another in the domestic market, and had become increasingly divorced from world prices.
- The system appeared to stifle innovation and to offer no basis for selecting between investment and production alternatives or for judging efficiency.

By the early 1960s, several Czechoslovak economists had analyzed these problems and had remedies to offer. In October 1964, the party published a set of principles for major economic reform and, beginning in 1965, started implementing specific measures. In June 1966, the Thirteenth Party Congress gave its official approval to the new program, which came to be called the New Economic Model (NEM). The implementation of the reform started in 1967 and it accelerated the political developments of 1968. The reform program was multifaceted, and portions of it were never implemented. Its principal object was to limit significantly the role of the central planning authorities while expanding the autonomy and responsibility of the enterprises:

- The central planning authorities were to concern themselves only with overall long-term planning and to provide general guidance.
- Enterprises and their associations would be free to determine short-term production targets.
- Individual enterprises were to become financially viable, realizing a profit from their sales.
- State subsidies would gradually end; enterprises that could not operate at a profit would have to close.
- Profit, rather than fulfillment of planned quantitative output targets, was to become the main criterion for evaluating the economic performance of enterprises.
- Producers were to be increasingly exposed to foreign competition, so that they would seek to increase their own productivity and lower prices.
- As a means of earning much- needed hard currencies, exports to Western countries were to be stimulated through incentives encouraging enterprises to make their products competitive on world markets.
- A more realistic system of prices was to replace the centrally determined system. Prices were to reflect actual costs, the supply and demand situation, and relevant world prices. Enterprises were to finance investments with their own resources and interest-bearing bank loans and would have to justify their investments in terms of need, effectiveness, and cost so that widespread waste of investment resources would cease.
- Finally, a revised wage and salary system was to eliminate egalitarianism in the wage structure and substitute a system based on individual work performance and on results obtained by the employing enterprise.

Furthermore, the government consolidated enterprises into large production units resembling trusts or cartels managed by "branch directorates." These large production units formed an intermediate link between the enterprises and the ministries. The branch directorates had overall responsibility for the performance of enterprises under their jurisdiction, but the division of authority between the larger unit or trust and its subordinate members was not clearly defined. In the spring of 1968, the government permitted enterprises to experiment with worker participation in management through the establishment of enterprise councils.

Czechoslovak reformers did not intend to permit free play of market forces. They had implemented only a portion of their program by August 1968, when Soviet and other Warsaw Pact troops invaded the country and the reform experiment came to an end. The next two years saw the gradual dismantling of most of the program. By the early 1970s, almost all traces of the reform measures had vanished.

In the late 1960s and early 1970s, the Czechoslovak economy continued to grow at a respectable rate throughout the period. From 1966 to 1970, the period of the Fourth Five-Year Plan, net material product grew at an average annual rate of 6.9%, well exceeding the planned yearly increase of 4.1 to 4.4%.

=== 1970s ===
Economic "normalization" resulted in a reversion to mandatory central planning and price controls. Only a few modifications of the central planning system remained, including devolution of some aspects of planning to the consolidated production units and modification of some plan indicators to emphasize efficiency, productivity, quality, and innovation rather than simply gross output targets.

Performance was still gratifying during the Fifth Five-Year Plan (1971–75). During this period, net material product grew somewhat more slowly, averaging 5.7% yearly, but still exceeded the planned rate of 5.1% yearly. Wages, incomes, and personal consumption levels rose at respectable rates despite an overall increase in investment. Agriculture continued to be a weak area but had improved markedly. By 1975 the agricultural sector was almost self-sufficient in animal production, and self- sufficiency in crop production appeared to be an attainable goal. Rural wages rose, and mechanization progressed rapidly.

During the Sixth Five-Year Plan (1976–80), by contrast, economic performance was far less satisfactory; in the closing years of the period, the slowdown in economic growth became especially noticeable. Net material product grew by only 3.7% yearly on average, instead of the 4.9% called for by the plan. Both agriculture and industry and productivity increase failed to meet planned growth targets Problems in agriculture were in part a result of drought (1976) and severe winter and spring flooding (1979). Other factors, such as shortages of agricultural machinery and spare parts and poor quality of fertilizer, also affected the agricultural sector. Large imports of grain necessarily continued. During the plan period, growth rates in personal consumption declined, reaching a low point of 0.5% in 1979. At the same time, in contrast to the previous plan period, retail prices rose by about 11% over the 5-year period. During the last few years of the plan, there were widespread consumer complaints about the unavailability of basic commodities such as meat, milk, and vegetables. The economy's performance was lackluster despite the continuing infusion of substantial investment funds. In part, the rise in the investment rate in the 1970s reflected large capital expenditures for increased mining of coal and other fuels and for the development of engineering branches to produce equipment for nuclear power plants. Nevertheless, given the considerable funding poured into the economy, the mediocre condition of the Czechoslovak industrial plant in general at the end of the 1970s must have been discouraging to economic planners.

The energy and trade problems Czechoslovakia faced in the late 1970s were also major factors in the slowdown in industrial growth. The terms on which Czechoslovakia conducted foreign trade had begun to deteriorate sharply by the mid-1970s. After 1974 the rapid rise of world oil prices was partially reflected in the price of oil from the Soviet Union, Czechoslovakia's principal source of fuel and raw materials. Prices of other materials on which the country's economy depended also increased faster than the prices of its exports, which consisted primarily of manufactured goods (especially machinery). Party and government leaders were cautious about increasing foreign indebtedness and attempted to maintain a high level of exports. Increasingly in the 1970s, a substantial portion of the country's production of consumer goods and machinery was diverted to export markets to meet the rising import bill. Restraints on imports from noncommunist countries reduced inputs for domestic industries.

=== 1980–1985 ===
At the beginning of the 1980s, the economy had substantial limitations, which were recognized by economists, political leaders, and even the public at large. The country had perhaps the oldest stock of plant and equipment in Eastern Europe, a stagnant resource base, and growing dependence on energy and material imports. To reduce requirements for energy and raw materials and to increase the competitiveness of Czechoslovak exports, domestic production needed to become more efficient. Furthermore, consumption standards continued to be well below those found in Western Europe.

Economic planners set relatively modest growth targets for the Seventh Five-Year Plan (1981–1985), revising their goals downward two years into the plan. "Intensification" of the economy—focusing on efficient use of resources rather than simply quantitative growth—was the keynote of government policy. The early years of the Seventh Five-Year Plan saw a serious slump in the economy. During 1981 and 1982, personal consumption actually declined. The cost of living rose more rapidly than wages. During the final three years, however, an economic recovery made up for the earlier poor performances; according to official calculations, the country succeeded in either meeting or surpassing domestic goals during the plan period as a whole. Results of the "intensification" effort were disappointing, however, as leaders acknowledged. During the plan, consumption of energy decreased by only 1.7% per annum, less than the 2% goal of the plan .

The relatively favorable outcome of the Seventh Five-Year Plan was noteworthy, particularly because several international trends had had negative effects on the Czechoslovak economy during the period. A recession in developed Western countries dampened their markets for Czechoslovak exports; and in 1981 the Soviet Union announced its intention to scale back oil exports to Eastern Europe, including Czechoslovakia, by 10%. Although in 1983 and 1984 worldwide prices for oil began to drop, the Comecon (or Soviet) price, tied to a 5-year formula, caused the price of Soviet oil (16.4 million of the 16.6 million tons imported by Czechoslovakia in 1984) to continue to climb. In 1982 the decision of Western banks to restrict credit to Eastern Europe as a result of Poland's serious payment problems and the sizable debts of other East European countries impeded Czechoslovakia's foreign trade with the West.

The poor performance of the economy in the early 1980s persuaded party leaders that some changes were needed. Therefore, in conjunction with the Seventh Five-Year Plan, in 1981 the government introduced a series of limited reforms called the "Set of Measures to Improve the System of Planned National Economic Management after 1980." Relatively conservative in design and initiated without fanfare, these reforms permitted somewhat greater freedom of action for managers of enterprises in selected operational areas, giving them more authority over their own investment activities and over providing financial incentives to workers. The intention was to make industry as a whole more aware of prices and costs. The reforms did not call for any appreciable loosening of central planning and control. In 1982 parallel reform measures were introduced for agriculture; the measures permitted farm officials to exercise greater management initiative and limited the number of binding targets imposed on farm production. Many Western observers believed that these reforms did have a helpful effect during the final years of the plan. It was felt, however, that these partial reforms were not sufficiently comprehensive to bring about the modernization and improvements in efficiency sought by Czechoslovakia's leaders.

=== 1986–1989 ===
The Eighth Five-Year Plan called for further "intensification" within the economy. The plan focused on raising the quality and technological level of production, lowering the cost of energy and materials in relation to output, increasing labor productivity, accelerating the pace of innovation at the workplace, improving discipline, and continuing the "structural" shift of the economy from productive activities requiring great consumption of energy to more advanced technologies and capital-intensive industry. National income was to rise 19%, or just over 3.5% annually on average. Plans called for industrial output to grow 15.8%, an average increase of about 3% yearly, while personal consumption was to grow by only 11.9%. Modest as these targets were, they were higher than the results achieved during the Seventh Five-Year Plan. Only agriculture was to grow at a rate slower than that of the previous plan period; with a total increase of 6.9%, it would average just over 1% growth annually. Investment, while still low, would increase 10.4% during the plan (as compared with 2.5% in the 1981–85 period). Special attention was to be given to the machine-building and electronics industries, the chemical and metallurgical industries, construction of nuclear power plants and expansion of the natural gas network, and environment-related projects. The plan called for exports to grow at a higher rate than the national income. The government did not plan any substantial borrowing in hard currency, concentrating instead on paying off its relatively modest (US$2 billion) debt to the West.

In the mid-1980s, Czechoslovak leaders acknowledged the persisting weaknesses in the country's economy and its need to modernize more rapidly. Although the government announced no major reforms in conjunction with the Eighth Five-Year Plan, in 1987 an experiment was begun involving about 120 industrial enterprises. These enterprises were to receive only key planning figures from the central authorities; otherwise, they were to have increased autonomy in planning production, seeking profitable forms for their activities, and managing their own finances. The reforms represented a significant step beyond the modest "Set of Measures" of 1981, which had retained strict central controls. This was a cautious response to the more ambitious reforms sponsored by General Secretary Mikhail Gorbachev in the Soviet Union.

Data on late 1987 to 1989 need to be added.

== Financial system and banking ==
=== Currency ===
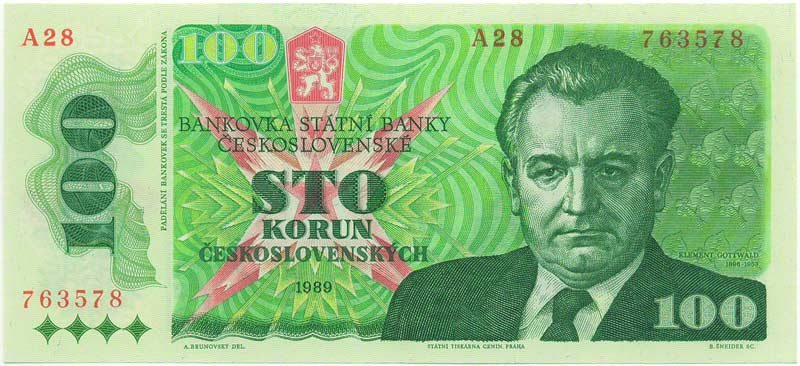
Obverse of the 100 Kčs banknote of the State Bank of Czechoslovakia dated 1989

The koruna (Kčs), or crown, was the national currency and consisted of 100 haléřů. In 1986 the currency continued to be convertible only under restricted conditions and at official rates. Violation of exchange regulations constituted a serious offense. The koruna could be used only within the country and was not used in foreign trade. In 1987 the official, or commercial, exchange rate was Kcs5.4 per US$l; the tourist, or noncommercial, rate was Kcs10.5 per US$l. The koruna was legally defined in terms of 123 milligrams of gold, which provided a historical basis for the commercial rate.

=== Banking system ===
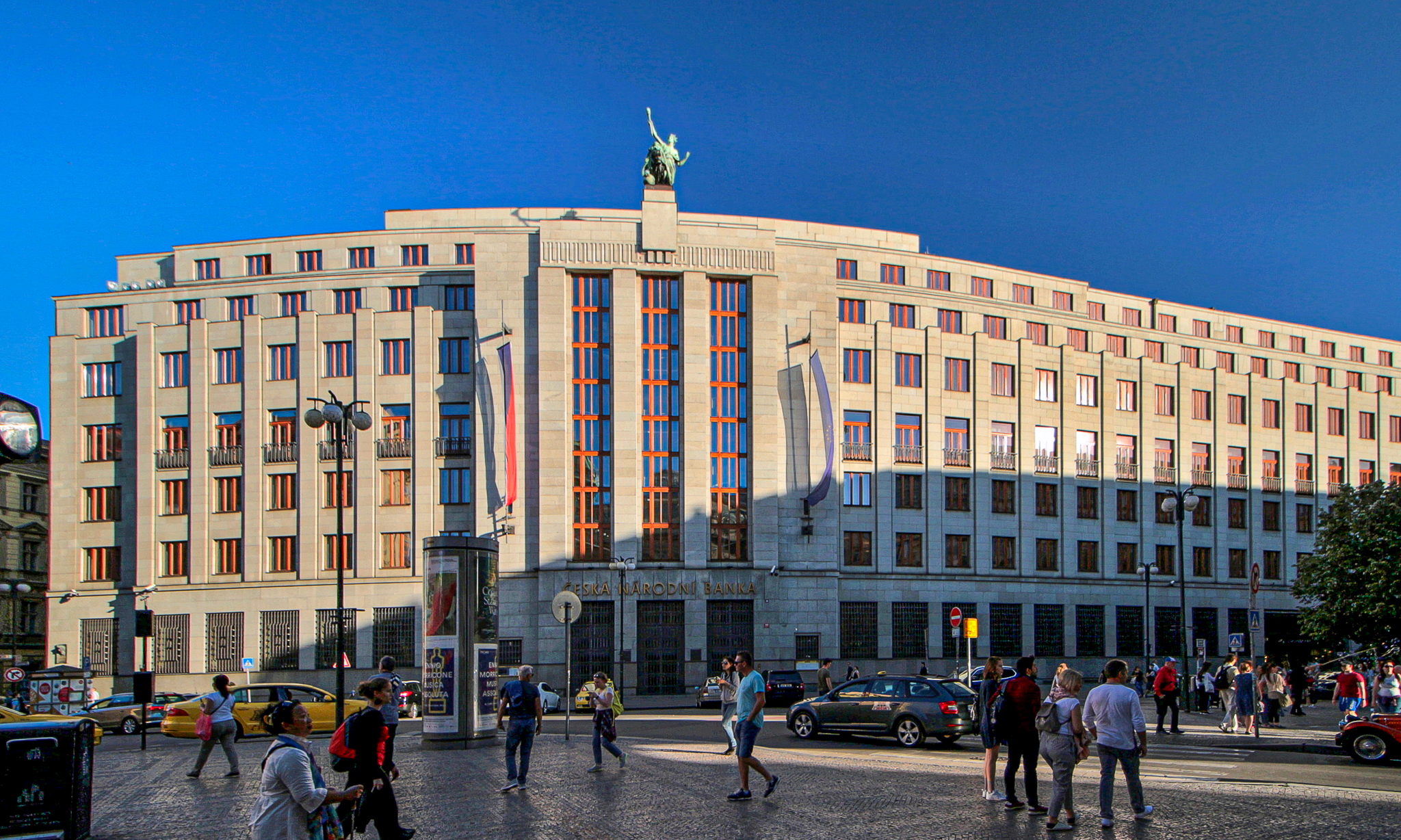
From its establishment in 1950, the State Bank of Czechoslovakia was located in the former Prague head office of Živnostenská Banka.

- At the head of the country's banking system was the State Bank of Czechoslovakia. The State Bank was the central bank, the government's financial agent, the country's commercial bank, an investment bank, and the clearing agent for collection notices. It also supervised the other banking in the country and, in conjunction with specific ministries, formulated the financial plan for Czechoslovakia. The other banks, also state owned, were subordinate to the State Bank and relegated to special functions.
- The Commercial Bank of Czechoslovakia was primarily the bank for foreign currency transactions.
- Three additional banks—two of which were savings banks, one for each of the republics, providing credit to individuals—completed the banking system in 1980.

The main function of the banking system was to act as the government's agent in implementing the financial plan, an important part of which consisted of expanding and contracting credit to meet the economy's needs. The central authorities controlled most investments directly, and the national plan regulated production. The State Bank acted as a supervisory agent in extending credit to the enterprises, ensuring that the investments met plan goals. The bulk of bank credit was for working capital, largely utilized to finance the purchase of materials and the sale of finished products. The powers of the State Bank appeared to be somewhat limited, however, since credit was extended according to guidelines for planned production.

The central authorities set interest rates, which neither reflected the cost of capital nor appreciably affected the flow of credit. Instead, beginning in the 1970s, interest rates were differentiated to accomplish objectives of the plan. Interest rates were low for enterprises modernizing a production process. Punitive rates were used if firms deviated from plan goals. In the mid-1980s, the greatest portion of investment credits went to the industrial sector, followed by agriculture, construction, and retail trade.

The banking system operated within the framework of the financial plan. Major elements of the financial plan included allocation to consumption and investment, foreign and domestic financing of investment, and wage and price changes. Planning authorities were in a position to use the centralized banking system to carry out major corrective measures, as occurred in 1953 when inflationary pressures became serious and the population's accumulated savings were largely wiped out by a conversion of the currency. After this experience, officials placed stricter controls on investments, permitting real wages and the standard of living to rise gradually. But in the late 1970s, and particularly in the early 1980s, the worsening terms of trade, bottlenecks in the economy, and the need for large investments in energy and industry combined to limit the allocations for consumption.

=== Inflation and prices ===
Imposition of the Soviet model introduced a chronic inflationary bias into the Czechoslovak economy, although the inflation was not necessarily reflected in prices. Control of prices (only private food produce, especially fruit and vegetables, were priced freely) repeatedly produced inflationary manifestations in other areas, such as shortages in the market and increased savings by the population. Although officials generally limited the rise in prices (causing price indexes to advance slowly), by the mid-1970s prices had to be adjusted upward more frequently. This trend continued into the 1980s, and major food price increases occurred in 1982.

=== Budget and taxes ===
In addition to the banking system, another major financial tool for implementing economic policies and the annual plan was the central and republic government budgets. The Czechoslovak government published little budget information. Western observers believed that small surpluses of revenues were more common than deficits, however. Budget revenues were derived primarily from state economic organizations and the turnover tax. Income taxes provided a small part of revenues. Other minor revenue sources included agricultural taxes and customs duties. The planning authorities redistributed these budget funds according to the plan guidelines, using the budget to encourage certain sectors through subsidies or investment funds.

Central authorities set prices on over 1.5 million kinds of goods. State enterprises were theoretically autonomous financial entities that covered costs and profits from sales. Because the government set production quotas, wage rates, and prices for the products manufactured and the inputs used in the process, however, managers had little freedom to manage. In the 1950s, the government had collected nearly all enterprise funds above costs for redirection according to its priorities. After the 1958 reforms, enterprises obtained a little more control over surplus funds, although the government continued to control the amount of the surplus. In the 1980s, the government was encouraging enterprises to undertake modernization and other limited investment from their own funds and bank credit and to rely less on budget funds.

The turnover tax, another major source of budget revenue, was originally employed in the Soviet Union as a simple and effective method of collecting most of the funds needed by the government without requiring extensive bookkeeping and estimating. It was introduced in Czechoslovakia in 1953 and lost its importance as the chief source of revenue only in the late 1960s, when other levies extracted funds from state enterprises. The tax was collected on goods destined for retail, the rate varying according to the difference between the producer's costs plus approved margin and the selling price as specified by pricing officials. Retail prices of manufactured consumer goods, such as clothing and particularly tobacco products, alcoholic beverages, and sugar, were substantially higher than those of such basic necessities as potatoes, milk, and eggs. The turnover tax appeared to be both a source of revenue and a tool used to influence consumption patterns.

== See also ==
- Eastern Bloc economies

== Notes ==
- Bideleux, Robert; Jeffries, Ian (2007), A History of Eastern Europe: Crisis and Change, Routledge, ISBN 978-0-415-36626-7
- Black, Cyril E.; English, Robert D.; Helmreich, Jonathan E.; McAdams, James A. (2000), Rebirth: A Political History of Europe since World War II, Westview Press, ISBN 0-8133-3664-3
- Crampton, R. J. (1997), Eastern Europe in the twentieth century and after, Routledge, ISBN 0-415-16422-2
- Dale, Gareth (2005), Popular Protest in East Germany, 1945–1989: Judgements on the Street, Routledge, ISBN 0714654086
- Frucht, Richard C. (2003), Encyclopedia of Eastern Europe: From the Congress of Vienna to the Fall of Communism, Taylor & Francis Group, ISBN 0-203-80109-1
- Hardt, John Pearce; Kaufman, Richard F. (1995), East-Central European Economies in Transition, M.E. Sharpe, ISBN 1-56324-612-0
- Maddison, Angus (2006), The world economy, OECD Publishing, ISBN 92-64-02261-9
- Pearson, Raymond (1998), The Rise and Fall of the Soviet Empire, Macmillan, ISBN 0-312-17407-1
- Turnock, David (1997), The East European economy in context: communism and transition, Routledge, ISBN 0-415-08626-4
