= Resource base of Communist Czechoslovakia =

The Socialist Republic of Czechoslovakia (1948–1990) had significant natural resources available. Energy resources included coal and lignite, but to meet energy needs the country also engaged in energy conservation, imports of oil and natural gas from the Soviet Union, and nuclear power and hydroelectricity programs. Czechoslovakia had limited deposits of various metallic mineral ores, and the bulk of mineral supplies were again imported. Other resources within the country were agricultural land, forestry, and labor power.

== Minerals, oil and power plants ==
=== Minerals and mining ===
Czechoslovakia had significant quantities of coal and lignite.

- Hard coal suitable for extraction was present in the Ostrava coalfields and near Kladno, Plzeň, Košice, and Trutnov.
- Brown coal and lignite deposits were located around Chomutov and Most, in the Sokolov field near Karlovy Vary, at Teplice, at České Budějovice, and near Modrý Kameň and Handlová in Slovakia. Reserves of oil and natural gas were rather small (see Oil and gas deposits in the Czech Republic).
- Iron ore was mined in the Slovak Ore Mountains and near Prague and Plzeň, but reserves have nearly been exhausted in the 1980s.
- There were also deposits of copper and manganese ores in the Slovenské Rudohorie.
- Lead and zinc ores were found at Kutná Hora and Příbram in central Bohemia, but in insignificant quantities.
- There were small amounts of mercury, antimony, and tin in the Ore Mountains, which also contained substantial uranium deposits (see Uranium mining in Czechoslovakia).
- Additional mineral resources include salt in Slovakia, graphite near České Budějovice, and kaolin near Plzeň and Karlovy Vary.

=== 1970-1985 ===
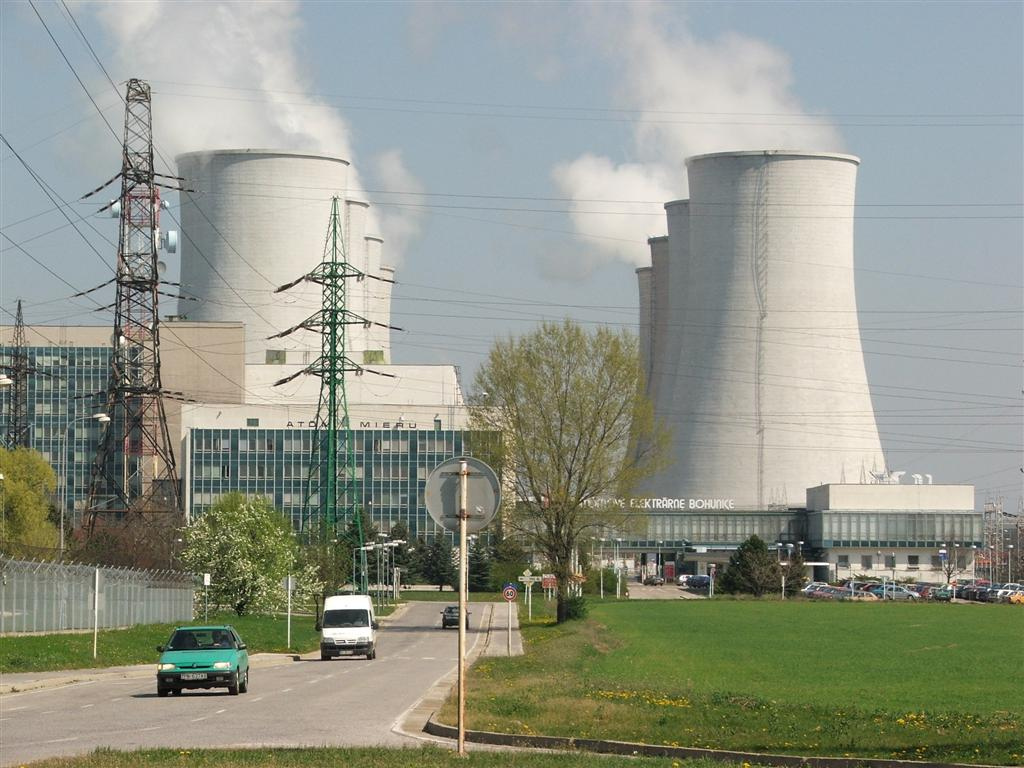
Bohunice Nuclear Power Plant commissioned in 1972

In the 1970s, coal production expanded. During these years, the growing need for energy was met primarily by imported oil and, from the mid-1970s, by natural gas; almost all imports of oil and gas came from the Soviet Union. Domestic crude oil sources and production were modest. Within Czechoslovakia itself, numerous small oil and gas fields had been discovered, but production was minor (about 100,000 tons of crude oil and 800 million cubic meters of natural gas in 1985). These supplied only a small fraction of the country's needs. Geological surveys largely ruled out the possibility of future discoveries of major oil or gas deposits, although one significant new source of natural gas was discovered in 1985 near Gbely in western Slovakia.

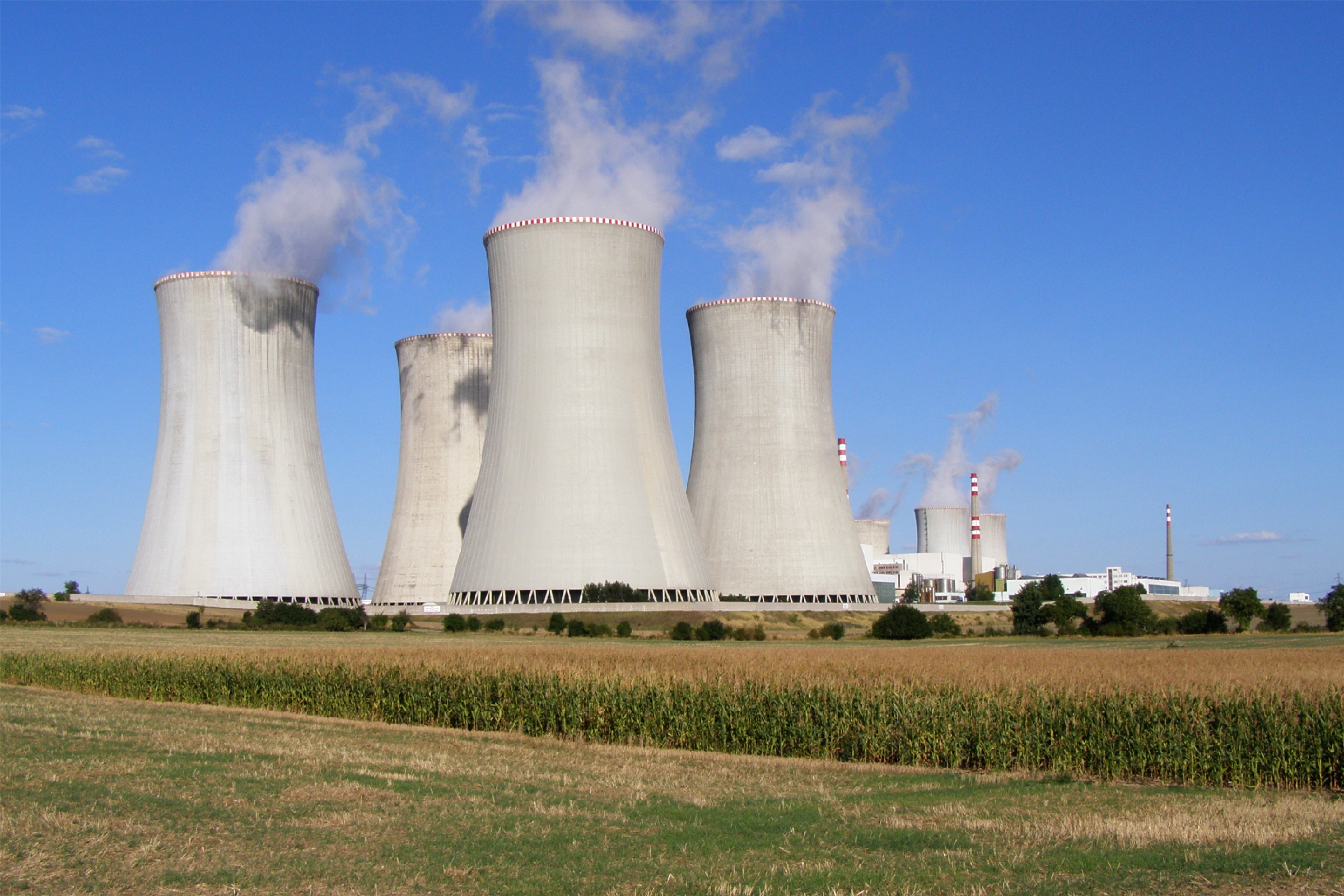
Dukovany Nuclear Power Station commissioned in 1974

During the 1970s, the Soviet Union found it increasingly difficult and costly to meet the fuel and raw materials needs of Czechoslovakia and other East European countries. The unexploited Soviet resources tended to be located in Siberia, where extraction and transport were difficult and costly. One solution to the problem was Comecon's decision to adjust Soviet energy prices annually after 1974; as a result, Soviet prices approached—and eventually at times exceeded—world market prices. The adjustment improved the terms of trade of the Soviet Union at the expense of Czechoslovakia and its neighbors when world prices for many commodities, particularly crude oil, rose sharply in the middle and late 1970s. The higher prices in turn resulted in a larger return to the Soviet Union for its exports of fuels and raw materials and helped to finance expansion of Soviet production capacity. In addition, in the 1970s Comecon initiated several joint projects, such as the construction of a major natural gas pipeline from the Soviet Union to Eastern Europe and of large nuclear power plants in the Soviet Union. The participating countries, including Czechoslovakia, received payments in the form of natural gas and electricity. In the mid-1980s, Czechoslovakia also participated in construction of the Yamburg natural gas pipeline "Progress" in the Soviet Union.

From 1967 to 1984, Czechoslovakia benefited additionally from a special agreement with the Soviet Union—in effect a Czechoslovak credit from 1967—whereby Czechoslovakia received 5 million tons of Soviet crude oil a year at a late 1960s price, which was just a small fraction of the world market price. Thus while increased Soviet fuel and raw materials export prices imposed a severe burden on Czechoslovakia, the cost was substantially less than if the country had imported these materials from noncommunist countries. In 1980 a Czechoslovak official indicated that Czechoslovakia was paying about one-fourth the world price for its oil imports. By 1985, however, the situation had changed dramatically. In 1981 the Soviet Union had announced a 10-percent cutback in the crude oil it would deliver to Central European countries during the 1981-85 period. Subsequently—and for a variety of other reasons—world oil prices plummeted, but the Soviet price, based on the five-year formula, continued to rise.

=== Mid-1980s ===
==== Minerals ====
In the mid-1980s, Czechoslovakia's mineral resources were meager. The country was heavily dependent on imports of raw materials for use in industry. Deposits of ferrous metals were small and low grade. Imports, especially from the Soviet Union, supplied the dominant share of iron ore for the country's important iron and steel industry. Magnetite, a basic input for the steel industry, was more plentiful, making exports possible during the 1970s and 1980s. Deposits of nonferrous metals were limited or nonexistent. Imports supplied most of the country's needs for these metals. The country also produced limited amounts of gold and mercury. Imports supplied most of the country's needs for nonferrous metals. Czechoslovakia did supply most of its own requirements for nonmetallic minerals to support the manufacture of building materials, glass, and ceramics.

The bulk of the country's mining activity involved coal, the principal domestic energy source. In 1985 production of all coal amounted to 126.6 million tons, a 2.1% drop over 1984 that signaled the accelerating exhaustion of easily worked, high-grade reserves. In 1985 Czechoslovakia depended on coal for 60% of its energy consumption in contrast with 88% in 1960.

==== Energy conservation ====
In the mid-1980s, the country's leaders considered energy conservation essential. Czechoslovakia's heavy reliance on fuel imports was costly, with imports supplying 95% of the country's needs. Conservation was also essential because although Soviet supplies of natural gas were expected to increase, the more important flow of crude oil was likely to stagnate. In the short run, extraction of domestic coal would help Czechoslovakia meet its growing energy needs, but the increase would be slow and costly because deeper deposits had to be mined in order to meet quotas. The fuel problem was especially acute because Czechoslovak industry had a high input of energy per unit of national income, a rate substantially higher than that of Western Europe and some of Central and East European countries (7.5 tons of standard fuel per inhabitant per year). Industrial consumption of largely imported raw materials and energy was acknowledged to be perhaps as much as 40% higher than in comparable advanced industrial countries. The Communist Party of Czechoslovakia (KSČ) leadership accurately believed that considerable savings were possible.

==== Nuclear plants ====
Nevertheless, energy conservation alone would not suffice. Since the 1970s, economic planners had been pursuing an ambitious nuclear energy program. In the long run, in their judgment, nuclear power was absolutely vital to the projected energy balance. In late 1978, the first major nuclear power plant (of Soviet design) began operation at Jaslovské Bohunice. In 1985 and 1986, portions of the Dukovany station began test runs, and preliminary site work was underway for two more power stations, at Mochovce in western Slovakia and Temelín in southern Bohemia. Nuclear power's share of the total electricity supply increased to almost 20% in 1986. According to the long-range plan, with expansion of this power station plus construction of additional stations and the import of electricity from joint nuclear projects in the Soviet Union, nuclear power would provide 30% or more of total electricity by 1990. Plans called for nuclear power to account for over 53% of electricity by the year 2000. Although the 1986 Chernobyl accident in the Soviet Union did not alter the government's commitment to nuclear power, particularly since none of the existing or planned reactors used the kind of technology employed at Chernobyl, Czechoslovak leaders acknowledged the need for a thorough review of safety measures. Subsequently a number of special conferences were held concerning nuclear power issues. Czechoslovakia was well positioned to fuel its ambitious nuclear program; in the mid-1980s, the country was an important producer of uranium. The uranium reserves were located in the Ore Mountains of Bohemia.

==== Hydroelectric plants ====
In the mid-1980s, Czechoslovakia had a substantial number of hydroelectric plants, located mainly on the Váh and Vltava rivers. Work was underway on a major hydroelectric power project on the Danube River at Gabčíkovo–Nagymaros, a controversial joint project with Hungary to which environmentalists, especially in Hungary, had objected. The completed project was expected to supply about 4% of Czechoslovak energy requirements. In 1986 the government approved plans for construction of several additional power stations on the Labe River and Váh Rivers by the end of the century. Czechoslovakia imported some electricity every year from Romania.

== Land and forest ==
In the 1980s, agricultural land constituted just under 55% of the country's total land area, and most of this land was suitable for tillage. The soil is relatively fertile in the lowlands but less productive in the mountainous regions. About one-third of the country's territory is forested. Czech forests had serious environmental problems, primarily as a result of "acid rain" pollution from coal-fired power stations. In the 1980s, the authorities acknowledged the seriousness of the problem, and the Eighth Five-Year Plan (1986-1990) allocated funding to combat the pollution.

== Labor ==
In 1985 Czechoslovakia's total labor force amounted to about 7.6 million persons. Of these, 46.1% were women, giving Czechoslovakia one of the highest female labor rates in the world. Almost 88% of the population of working age (between 15 and 59 years of age for men and between 15 and 54 for women) was employed in 1985. About 37.4% of the work force was in industry, 13.7% in agriculture and forestry, 24.3% in other productive sectors, and 24.6% in the service sectors.

During the first two decades following World War II, redistribution of the work force, especially movement from agriculture to industry, had provided an influx of workers for the government's program emphasizing heavy industry. Women also had entered the work force in record numbers. But falling birthrates in the 1960s, noticeable first in the Czech lands but subsequently occurring in Slovakia as well, gave reason for concern.

During the 1970s, the government introduced various measures to encourage workers to continue working after reaching retirement age, with modest success. In addition, the large number of women already participating in the work force precluded significant increases from this source.

By the mid-1980s, the labor supply was a serious problem for Czechoslovakia. During the Seventh Five-Year Plan (1981–85), the work force increased by less than 3%. Czechoslovakia's service sectors were less developed than those of the more industrialized countries of Western Europe, and the 1980s employment in services continued to expand faster than employment in the productive sectors. The expansion placed additional constraints on industrial enterprises seeking to fill positions. Some Western observers suggested that the labor shortage resulted in part from the tendency of many industrial enterprises to overstaff their operations.

Party and government officials set wage scales and work norms. As part of reform measures effective after 1980, incentive rewards represented a larger share of total pay than had previously been the case. Work norms also increased. Officials were clearly soliciting a greater effort from workers, in terms of both quantity and quality.

In the mid-1980s, most of the labor force was organized and was represented, at least in theory, by unions. The party controlled the unions, and a major task of the unions was to motivate workers to work harder and fulfill the plan goals. The unions served as vehicles for disseminating desired views among the workers. The principal activity of the trade unions was the administration of health insurance, social welfare, and workers' recreation programs.
