= Religion in Czechoslovakia =

Religious beliefs in Czechoslovakia

At the beginning of the Communist era, Czechoslovakia had a varied religious tradition, with Roman Catholicism as the dominant faith alongside Protestant, Orthodox, Jewish, and Uniate communities. The communist regime sought to suppress religion, promoting "scientific atheism" through policies that restricted clergy, closed monasteries, and controlled religious education. The 1950s saw mass arrests of clergy and the forced suppression of the Greek Catholic Church in favour of Orthodoxy.

Despite these efforts, religious belief, particularly in Slovakia, persisted. The 1968 reforms briefly eased restrictions, but normalisation in the 1970s brought renewed persecution, targeting Catholic and Uniate communities while favouring state-controlled churches. By the 1980s, the state maintained strict control over religious practice, yet underground movements and youth interest in religion grew.

== Late 1940s ==
Czechoslovakia entered the communist era with a varied religious heritage. There were nine major creeds listed in its censuses: Roman Catholic, Ruthenian Greek Catholic Church (called "Uniate"), the Evangelical Church of Czech Brethren, Lutheran, Calvinist, Orthodox, the Czech Reformed Church (the Hussites), the Old Catholic Church, and Judaism. Nearly 6 percent of the population was without religious preference. At the time of the communist takeover, more than two out of every three citizens were Roman Catholics, but within each major ethnic group there was a small minority of Protestants: Bohemian Brethren in the Czech lands, Lutherans in Slovakia, and Calvinists among the Hungarians.

== 1950s and 1960s ==
In 1950, the Communist authorities carried out Operations K and R, aiming to dismantle monastic life, confiscate ecclesiastical property, and bring religious institutions under strict state control. During the Stalinist trials of the 1950s, more than 6,000 religious people, including some who were sick or elderly, received prison sentences averaging more than five years apiece. Between 1948 and 1968, the number of priests declined by half, and half the remaining clergy were over 60 years of age. The Catholic Church had already lost a substantial number of clergy with the expulsion of the Sudeten Germans; it faced significant problems with understaffed parishes and an aging clergy. Protestant sects, less dependent on a centralized hierarchy in the running of ecclesiastical affairs and less prominent because of their minority status, fared better.

Between 1950 and 1968, the Greek Catholic Church was prohibited. Greek Catholics, sometimes called Uniates, are part of the Catholic Church but with very close cultural and liturgical similarities to the Eastern Orthodox churches. The communist regime sought to Russify whatever it could and followed a longstanding Russian policy of opposing the Uniate Church. Soon after coming to power, the party forcibly repressed the Greek Catholic Church (following the earlier example of the Soviet Union) in favour of the Russian Orthodox Church. The Orthodox had been a distinct minority in Czechoslovakia, but Orthodox priests took over Greek Catholic parishes as the Uniate clergy were imprisoned or sent to work on farms in the Czech lands. The shortage of priests was so extreme that the party gave a crash course in Orthodox doctrine to "politically mature" teachers in the region and sent them into Uniate churches to replace the Catholic clergy. Uniates responded with various forms of resistance, ranging from simply leaving church whenever an Orthodox priest arrived, to celebrating a liturgy among themselves without a priest.

== Late 1960s ==
Surveys in Moravia and Slovakia found that "scientific atheism" had not caught on quite as much as the Communist Party might have hoped after twenty years of party rule. In the traditionally Catholic Slovakia, only 14 percent were atheists and 15 percent undecided; atheism was highest among people between the ages of 25 and 39. Religious sentiment reflected social background: nine-tenths of all farmers were believers, as were three-fourths of all blue-collar workers and slightly more than one-half of all white-collar employees . Perhaps most disconcerting for the party was the realization that after two decades of denouncing clerics and clerical meddling in politics ("clerico-fascism"), 28 percent of those surveyed thought the clergy should have a public and political role.

In 1968, the situation for the churches brightened briefly. The regime of Alexander Dubček allowed the most closely controlled of the government-sponsored religious organizations (the Peace Movement of the Catholic Clergy and its Protestant counterpart) to lapse into inactivity. In 1968 the government also promised a prompt and humane solution to the Uniates' predicament (induced in part by the Uniates seizing "Orthodox" churches and demanding their own clergy and rites) and officially recognized the Uniate Church.

== 1970s ==
In the 1970s, the situation of religious groups in Czechoslovakia again deteriorated. The Roman Catholic Church, under the spiritual leadership of Cardinal František Tomášek, archbishop of Prague, was once more the principal target. Throughout the 1970s, the regime arrested clergy and lay people for distributing religious samizdat literature. Protestant and Jewish groups were also harassed, but the Orthodox churches and the Czechoslovak National Church were generally spared. In an effort to ensure a group of compliant and loyal clergy, the regime of Gustáv Husák organized a number of state-controlled associations, including the Ecumenical Council of the Churches of the Czechoslovak Socialist Republic and the Czechoslovak Association of Catholic Clergy (more commonly known as Pacem in Terris), with Czech and Slovak branches.

The regime showed a willingness to permit religious groups to practice their creeds as long as the clergy and the faithful did not bring religion into public life. The complication was that the regime counted almost anything as public life and so, for example, disallowed sermons on the high divorce rate or neglected children. Because the state licensed all clergy, it could weed out anyone deemed unresponsive to state requirements. Thus the clergy, who needed state approval to minister at all, were in a vulnerable position. By mid-1986 the regime had prohibited some 400 (of an approximate 3,200) Roman Catholic priests from ministering.

Theology departments continued to operate under strict admission quotas, and staffing problems grew throughout the 1970s. Chief Rabbi Richard Feder died in 1970, leaving the Czech Jewish communities without rabbinical direction until 1984. (Slovakia's rabbi was Samuel Grossman.) The new chief rabbi for the country, Daniel Mayer, studied for the rabbinate in Budapest. In 1972 the death of three Roman Catholic bishops and the revocation of state approval of a fourth exacerbated the already acute shortage of Roman Catholic leaders. Talks between the Vatican and the regime were sporadic through the 1970s and produced few material gains for Czechoslovak Roman Catholics. The perennial conflict remained: the appointment of regime loyalists in opposition to choices for parish and diocesan posts. In 1986, out of thirteen church offices, nine bishoprics were vacant and two archbishoprics (Olomouc and Trnava) had only bishops holding office.

If normalization after 1968 took a higher toll on the Czechs, the Slovaks have more recently borne the brunt of religious persecution. Slovakia's traditional adherence to (Roman Catholic) religion and an upsurge in belief and practices in the mid-1980s brought on sustained harassment and atheistic propaganda in Slovakia to a greater degree than in the Czech lands. Although methods differed, religious persecution in Slovakia equaled that suffered by the Charter 77 human rights activists and proscribed writers in the Czech lands.

== 1980s ==
Official policy toward religious groups in the 1980s was consistent with that of the early socialist era, when a series of measures sought to bring organized religion to heel. The state exercised substantial control over clerical appointments, religious instruction, preaching, and proselytization. Roman Catholics and Uniates were the major targets. The government closed convents and monasteries and strictly limited admissions to the two remaining seminaries.

In late 1980, there were signs of temporary worsening church-state relations. In October a number of students at the Cyril and Methodius Faculty of Divinity in Bratislava began a hunger strike in protest against Pacem in Terris. The state-controlled movement, they said, tried to undermine unity between priests and bishops. In an apparent reply to the incident, Bratislava's Pravda took the opportunity to denounce the resurgence of "clerico-fascist ideology," which, given the growth of socialism (commentators were quick to note), lacked a constituency in Czechoslovakia. Nonetheless, clericalism acted on "instructions of the church and clerical centers in the capitalist world." The official media were particularly critical of the "secret church," which the Vatican described as "not only the secretly ordained priests and bishops, secret convents and secret printing establishments in the country, but also the existing Catholic organizations and spiritual underground movements, as well as all priests and believers who are working illegally in the sphere of the church." These, however, were not organized into a single network. The underground church was believed to be particularly strong in Slovakia.

The relationship between the advocates of "scientific atheism" and various religious groups has been uneasy at best. The Czechoslovak Constitution permitted freedom of religion and expression, but in the 1980s citizens were well advised not to take these guarantees too literally. Government-controlled organizations existed for most religious creeds except Jehovah's Witnesses, who were prohibited. The most prominent was the Roman Catholic Church. There were also a variety of Protestant denominations, including the Czechoslovak Baptist Church, the Evangelical Church of Czech Brethren, the Slovak Evangelical Church, the Seventh-day Adventist Church, and the Methodist Church of Czechoslovakia. Also represented were the Czechoslovak National Church, the Uniate Church, and Jewish communities. In 1981 a number of church dignitaries stood before the Czechoslovak minister of culture to take a vow of loyalty to the Czechoslovak Socialist Republic.

A development that was particularly distressing to the authorities was the growing interest in religion on the part of young people in Czechoslovakia. In 1985, of the more than 100,000 people who took part in celebrations relating to the 1,100th anniversary of the death of Saint Methodius, Cardinal Tomášek noted that "two-thirds of the pilgrims were young people...." One culprit was seen to be the education system, which did not sufficiently stress a scientific-atheistic education.

== Situation at the end of Communism ==
The religious population was as follows, as of c. 1991: Nondenominational (39.9%), not identified (16.2%), Roman Catholic (39%), Evangelical Czech Brethren (2%), and Czechoslovak Hussite (1.7%).

== Bibliography ==
Gawdiak, Ihor (1989). Czechoslovakia: a country study (PDF) (3rd ed.). Federal Research Division & Library of Congress. ISSN 1057-5294.

RFE Czechoslovak Unit, Blinken Open Society Archives, Budapest

Spousta, Jan (2002). "Changes in Religious Values in the Czech Republic". Sociologický Časopis / Czech Sociological Review. 38 (3): 345–363. doi:10.13060/00380288.2002.38.3.06. JSTOR 41131814.

Vitkovic, Scott (2023). "The Czech Republic: From the Center of Christendom to the Most Atheist Nation of the 21st Century: Part II: The Martyred Church: The Clandestine Catholic Church (Ecclesia Silentii) in Czechoslovakia After Communism 1991-2021)". Religion in Eastern Europe. 43 (3): 37–59.
