= Society of Communist Czechoslovakia =

Czechoslovakia, of all the East European countries, entered the postwar era with a relatively balanced social structure and an equitable distribution of resources. Despite some poverty, overall it was a country of relatively well-off workers, small-scale producers, farmers, and a substantial middle class. Nearly half the population was in the middle-income bracket. It was a balanced and relatively prosperous Czechoslovakia that carried nationalization and income redistribution further than any other East European country. By the mid-1960s, the complaint was that leveling had gone too far. Earning differentials between blue-collar and white-collar workers were lower than in any other country in Eastern Europe. Further, equitable income distribution was combined in the late 1970s with relative prosperity. Along with East Germany and Hungary, Czechoslovakia enjoyed one of the highest standards of living of any of the Warsaw Pact countries through the 1980s.

Even in Czechoslovakia, where the party's pursuit of socialist equality was thorough, the "classless" society turned out to be highly diverse. In the mid-1980s, Czechoslovak censuses divided the population into several occupational groups: workers, other employees, members of various cooperatives (principally agricultural cooperatives), small farmers, self-employed tradesmen and professionals, and capitalists. Of these categories, "other employees" was the most diverse, encompassing everyone from low-level clerical workers to cabinet ministers. "Workers" were those whose jobs were primarily manual and industrial. There were well-known distinctions, explained below, between:

- workers (manual or low-level clerical employees),
- agricultural employees, and
- the intelligentsia (whose work is primarily mental and requires more education).

== The workers ==
In 1984 workers made up about one-half of the economically active population and were beneficiaries of policies geared toward maintaining the people's standard of living. According to many observers, Czechoslovakia's internal stability rested on an unspoken bargain between workers and the ruling KSC: relative material security in return for acquiescence to continued Soviet domination.

Much of working-class life reflected the regime's efforts to increase labor productivity without precipitating major labor unrest. Virtually full employment did not make the task easier. In 1984, nearly half the population worked. Some 85% of working-age women were employed (not including those on maternity leave), and there were almost 141,000 full-time university students. Working age for women was from fifteen through fifty-four, and for men it was from fifteen through fifty-nine. By the end of the 1970s, the labor shortage was severe enough for officials to call for greater efforts to employ "internal reserves" of labor, i.e., the partially disabled (of whom nearly one-third were already employed), full-time students, and farmers (during agricultural off-seasons). Voluntary brigades of students and apprentices supplied agricultural (harvest) and other labor during summer months. In Czechoslovakia, as in other socialist countries, virtually full employment often disguises underemployment. Large numbers of people work in positions below their qualifications. This is the result of different factors: some people are reluctant to move to other parts of the country to find work; politically and ideologically "objectionable" people must often turn to menial work; and politically "correct" people hold jobs for which they are not fully qualified. At many enterprises, instead of streamlining operations and dismissing employees whose job performance is unsatisfactory, managers merely shift workers to other positions or juggle employment statistics.

The party's compulsion to avoid labor unrest, enterprise managers' need to meet (or at least approach) production quotas, and a pervasive shortage of labor define the social dynamics of the workplace. Workers have relatively secure employment and income but lack sufficient consumer goods to absorb their income (the rate of saving is extremely high). Nor do workers have a substantive role in organizing work; Ota Šik, noted economic reformer during the 1960s, characterized the Czechoslovak worker as "alienated from the production process, from the fruits of labor, and from the management of industrial enterprises."

Workers' complaints have changed over the years as labor has become more scarce.

- In the 1950s real wages declined, resulting in periodic work stoppages.
- The 1953 currency reform sparked protests and demonstrations in major industrial centers that were little short of riots. Throughout the decade, party leaders complained about workers' "trade unionist" and "anarcho-syndicalist" attitudes and their "take what you can" mentality. Those arrested in the 1953 demonstrations were denounced as "bourgeois elements dressed up in overalls."
- During the Prague Spring of 1968, workers organized to support demands for political liberalization and more representative trade unions.
- By the late 1970s, forced overtime had become the workers' most insistent complaint, followed by poor working conditions. These complaints were coupled with steadfast opposition to linking wages with gains in productivity. Workers most frequently called for compliance with the labor code, which limited compulsory overtime (the maximum workweek was supposed to be forty-six hours) and provided for work safety regulations.

One solution to the labor shortage was foreign manpower from fellow socialist nations. For a long time, Poles provided the largest percentage of foreign manpower. In the late 1970s and early 1980s, however, the proportion of Vietnamese workers, brought in by the allied government of the Socialist Republic of Vietnam, grew rapidly. By the end of 1982, there were approximately 26,000 Vietnamese workers in Czechoslovakia, about 0.3% of the total manual work force, including apprentices. Reasons given for the rapid expansion of the Vietnamese contingent ranged from the Czechoslovak government's interest in training qualified labor for a friendly socialist country, to repayment of Vietnamese war debt, to the labor surplus in Vietnam. Problems arose as the number of Vietnamese increased drastically and as a program of merely hard work replaced what was to have been a program for training the Vietnamese in work skills. Other foreigners who worked in Czechoslovakia came from Cuba, Laos, the Mongolian People's Republic, and Hungary. Poles and Hungarians generally worked in their respective border areas.

Most women in Czechoslovakia worked, a reflection in part of the labor shortage and in part of the socialist belief that employment for women is the answer to inequality between the sexes. Although women in Czechoslovakia have had a long history of employment (they were over one-third of the labor force in 1930), the postwar surge in female employment has been truly dramatic. Four-fifths of the workers who entered the labor force from 1948 through 1975 were women. By the end of 1976, about 87% of working-age women had jobs; in 1984 about 90% of women in their reproductive years were in the labor force. In 1983 women remained concentrated in the traditional fields of female employment. Women's salaries have lagged behind those of men throughout the socialist era. Only 6 to 7% of middle and upper management positions were held by women. A number of factors account for this continuing inequality.

== Agricultural Workers ==
Rural society in the 1980s was a combination of cooperatives (approximately 73% of the agricultural labor force), state farms (18%), and private farms (9%). This represented a dramatic change from the First Republic with its politically active middle-sized farmers, small landholders, and differentiated labor force. Collectivized agriculture has not lacked occupational specialists, but there is no doubt that the socialist regime has streamlined rural society. Differences have persisted, but a dramatic leveling has taken place.

Collectivization began in 1949 with the Unified Agricultural Cooperatives Act. The KSC pushed collectivization efforts early in the 1950s and again later in the decade. Large landholders unwilling to join cooperatives and unwise enough to demur were condemned as "kulaks" and evicted without compensation. Subsequent criticism was muted. By 1960, when collectivization was essentially complete, 90% of all agricultural land was in the state sector—a proportion that slowly increased to 95% in 1985. During the 1960s, 1970s, and early 1980s, the number of cooperatives declined. Land was not returned to private cultivation, but rather the cooperative enterprises themselves were consolidated.

Farmers suffered through the 1950s: compulsory collectivization took their property, and the 1953 currency reform eradicated their savings. By the early 1960s, farm laborers worked longer than their nonagricultural counterparts and earned an average of 15% less. During the late 1960s and 1970s, agricultural earnings rose rapidly. Since the mid-1970s, the incomes of cooperative farm members and industrial workers have been comparable. So dramatic was the improvement that in a 1968 poll more than two-thirds of cooperative farm members preferred collectivized agricultural production to private farming.

The disparity between urban and rural living conditions narrowed in the 1970s. Government planners focused on improving rural day-care facilities; bringing cooperative and state-farm pensions to parity with those of other workers; and increasing the medical, educational, and shopping facilities available to rural dwellers. There was significant construction and renovation of rural housing. The number of new housing units available to cooperative members rose dramatically in the 1960s and then leveled off, although the number fluctuated from year to year. The general improvement in the amenities did not benefit agricultural workers alone; in the early 1970s, over 40% of all industrial workers lived in the countryside.

One result of increased incomes and improved rural living conditions was a rise in the educational level of the agricultural labor force. The percentage of cooperative members with a secondary-school education increased elevenfold from 1960 to the end of 1978, and that of members with a university degree increased thirteenfold.

== Intelligentsia ==
By convention, Marxist theorists subdivided the intelligentsia into:

- the creative (writers, artists, and journalists),
- the professional (lawyers, educators, physicians, civil servants, and party bureaucrats), and
- the technical (engineers - directors and deputy directors of socialist enterprises, chairmen of agricultural cooperatives, and managers of retail shops, hotels, restaurants, services, and housing).

The year 1948 saw a turnover in civil service personnel (especially the police) and a substantial influx of workers into political and managerial positions.

The 1950s purges struck hardest at the party faithful, i.e., the most direct beneficiaries of the 1948 takeover. The upheaval of nationalization and collectivization efforts that went further than anywhere else in Eastern Europe, coupled with two currency reforms, signaled a flux in economic fortunes during the first decade of communist rule. A Czech, for example, who was a chief executive in industry in 1948, worked as a carpenter for several years thereafter, served a number of years in prison, and then retrained for a career in law was not exceptional.

In early 1970s, over 25,000 government and trade union officials were replaced. All told, perhaps 150,000 professionals were unable to work in their fields by the end of the decade. The purges included technical and managerial personnel, as well as writers, artists, and KSC members active in the reform movement.

Estimates at the high end suggested that, from the late 1960s to the late 1970s, some 400,000 members of the intelligentsia joined the ranks of manual laborers.

=== Technical intelligentsia ===
In the mid-1980s, the technical intelligentsia occupied an ambiguous position in the decision-making hierarchy. On the one hand, their jobs often demanded considerable technical expertise; on the other hand, decision making in all sectors had a political component under communist rule. The technical intelligentsia had to reconcile the requirements of technical efficiency with those of political orthodoxy. From the KSC's perspective, the problem was to ensure a politically reliable corps of technical experts:

Throughout the 1970s, those selected for political compliance (versus training or expertise) predominated among the technical intelligentsia. When a party functionary was unable to meet the demands of his or her position, the custom was to call in a technical expert (even if not a party member) for assistance. KSC hard-liners consistently blocked efforts to reinstate reformist managers deposed after 1968.

Calls for more efficient management and periodic "reassessments" of managerial personnel accompanied changes in the ranks of the technical intelligentsia. In 1980 Federal Finance Minister Leopold Ler suggested that failure to meet production goals would be reflected in bonuses given to management and went so far as to intimate that managers might be dismissed for ineptitude. There was a concerted effort on the part of officialdom to make clear to managers that simple political compliance—adequate to ensure one's employment in the early 1970s—would have to be accompanied by efficiency in production in the 1980s.

=== Creative intelligentsia ===
As for the country's creative intelligentsia the KSC takeover ushered in the era of Stalinist socialist realism in Czechoslovakia's arts. It was a movement with strong overtones of Russian chauvinism and a deep anti-Western bias evident in a readiness to denounce anything remotely cosmopolitan as bourgeois, decadent, or both. One suspects that the country that had given world literature Švejk was particularly unpromising ground for Socialist Realism. A blind optimism coupled with revolutionary fervor are the key components of this "aesthetic," portraying life as it should be according to Marxist theory, rather than as it actually is.

In 1949, the KSC at its Ninth Party Congress issued "directives for new socialist culture." The congress declared that "literary and artistic production is an important agent of the ideological and cultural rebirth in our country, and it is destined to play a great role in the socialist education of the masses." Some arts maintained their tradition of excellence throughout the era. Theater productions relied on the classics for their repertoire. Czech filmmakers relied on anti-Nazi, World War II plots to produce works of world renown in the 1960s. This was and has continued to be a safe topic. But writers were a perennial source of consternation for the authorities. Officials of the Novotny regime periodically denounced them for "unprincipled liberalism." Those placed under interdict wrote, as the phrase went, "for the drawer"; some, like Novomesky, were sentenced to long prison terms.

In the 1970s, the regime's policies toward the creative intelligentsia were characterized by a compulsion to control creative activity, coupled with an active paranoia. These policies continued into the 1980s. What motivated censors in ferreting out antisocialist sentiments was sometimes difficult to fathom. Karel Gott, a popular male singer, recorded a song portraying a conversation between a casual lover and his sweetheart that was banned from radio and television. Officialdom found the lyrics "I'll flip a coin when you ask if I'm sincere or not when I say I love you" to be insulting to Czechoslovak currency.

Artists and writers belonged to their own professional organizations. Nonmembers could practice their art as long as they were loyal to the regime.

Musicians and singers faced further constraints. In particular, the regime found the personal habits of many members of popular musical groups too divergent from socialist ideals and subjected them to considerable harassment.

Writers endured the greatest repression. For the purged, with limited exceptions, official publishing outlets were closed. In the meantime, the three writers' unions (Czechoslovak, Czech, and Slovak), and especially the Czech Writers' Union, set about grooming a younger generation of writers who, if not overwhelmingly devoted to socialism, were at least assiduously apolitical. In the middle to late 1970s, there was a semithaw: the authorities permitted purged writers to recant and, after a proper measure of self-criticism, publish again. For those who did not avail themselves of this chance, options were indeed limited. By the end of the decade, the government had stepped up efforts to keep Czechoslovak authors from publishing abroad. Those writers who wished to publish successfully at home kept to safe territory—science fiction, World War II novels, fantasy, and children's literature—all noncontroversial, basically apolitical genres. A complicated bureaucratic apparatus governed censorship at home. The most critical variable was whether a writer had been expelled from the KSC or simply dropped from its membership lists. There were various kinds and degrees of interdiction: some writers could translate but not write, others could write plays but nothing else, and so forth. Banned writers could sometimes publish their work if a "cover person" assumed authorship. Because "normalization" was characteristically milder in Slovakia, writers were sometimes able to publish works in Bratislava that the Prague censors found unacceptable. This was also partly because the Slovak minister of culture was himself a writer.

== Associations ==
Historically, the right to form associations was first won in 1848, although the Habsburgs, realizing that they had opened a Pandora's box in their ethnically diverse empire, revoked it soon thereafter. The Czech lands regained this freedom in 1867. The Hungarians, however, offered more concerted opposition to Slovak efforts to organize. But Slovak emigres formed organizations wherever they went, and these associations agitated for Slovakia's inclusion in the First Republic.

In 1948 there were 6,000 to 7,000 clubs and societies in Czechoslovakia; these had long been integral to social life and national aspirations. A 1951 law gave the Ministry of Interior jurisdiction over associations, and in the 1960s there were only a few hundred societies still in existence. The right to form associations was limited, and the associations themselves were under strict KSC control. Cultural organizations operated under official auspices. Friendship leagues were particularly encouraged: Bulgarian-, Polish-, or Hungarian-Czechoslovak friendship societies could easily receive official approval. The regime particularly favored the Czechoslovak-Soviet Friendship League, though its rank-and-file membership declined as a result of a surge of anti-Soviet sentiment after the 1968 invasion. There was official sponsorship for "Circles of Creativity" and "Houses of Enlightenment." Cultural societies for German or Hungarian minorities were acceptable, but religious organizations faced significantly greater restrictions. Any association that might play a role in politics or the economy (that could however remotely or tenuously be construed to threaten KSC domination) was out of the question.

The Prague Spring reinforced this mania for control over associations. The reform movement's potential was nowhere more threatening to the hegemony of the party than in the population's persistent demands for more truly representative organizations in every area of life. That the KSC membership was underrepresented in the popularly elected leadership of such organizations confirmed the conservatives' worst suspicions: this was a reform movement whose popular manifestations would prove difficult to control. The regime's response was to restrict associations still more.

== The Communist Party of Czechoslovakia ==
see: Communist Party of Czechoslovakia

== Trade Unions ==
see: Trade Unions in Communist Czechoslovakia

== Youth Organizations ==
see: Youth organizations in Communist Czechoslovakia

== The Family ==
Families played a pivotal role, according to many observers, in transmitting just those characteristic Czech and Slovak values that have often been criticized by the regime, e.g., the Czech penchant for political pluralism and the Slovak devotion to Roman Catholicism.

The employment of the vast majority of married women of child-bearing age has favored three-generation extended families, in which grandparents (especially grandmothers) have helped women deal with the often conflicting demands of work and child upbringing:

- Family cooperation remained important because child-care centers could not accommodate all children of working mothers, nor would the centers accept children who were ill. Extended families in which a relative played a significant role in child rearing were more common in households where women had a secondary school or university education. Presumably the presence of a grandparent permitted these women to continue an education or assume work responsibilities that might have been precluded if they bore the major share of child care.
- Another factor encouraging extended family households has been Czechoslovakia's endemic housing shortage. Although the government's pronatalist policies favored married couples (especially those with children) in housing allocation, many young families (perhaps one-third) waited up to five years for their first separate apartment. Most of these families shared an apartment with a mother or mother-in-law. Divorced couples sometimes continued living together simply for want of other housing alternatives. For the elderly, who were expected to trade their apartments for smaller ones as spouses died and children left home, the situation was often difficult.

In the late 1970s and early 1980s, the number of marriages in Czechoslovakia declined while the number of divorces increased. Although marriages began to increase in 1982, the rate of divorce continued to climb; it rose from 14% in 1970 to 32% in 1985.
