= Inflationary bias =

Inflationary bias is the outcome of discretionary monetary policy that leads to a higher than optimal level of inflation. Depending on the way expectations are formed in the private sector of the economy, there may or may not be a transitory income increase. The term may also refer to the practice of a public debt-ridden nation enacting policies which encourage inflation in the medium/long term.

== Explanations ==
The Barro–Gordon model shows how the ability of government to manipulate leads to inflationary bias. In this model, it is assumed that a nation will attempt to keep the unemployment rate below its natural level. This will create an inflation in wages above their natural level, which ultimately results in an overall rate of inflation that is higher than the natural rate of inflation.

Thus, the main reason of the inflationary bias would be the time inconsistency. This is what Kydland and Prescott wrote in Rules rather than discretion: The inconsistency of optimal plans, in 1977: "Optimal control theory is an appropriate planning device for situations in which current outcomes and the movement of the system's state depend only upon current and past policy decisions and upon the current state. But, we argue, this is unlikely to be the case for dynamic economic systems. Current decisions of economic agents depend in part upon their expectations of future policy actions. Only if these expectations were invariant to the future policy plan selected would optimal control theory be appropriate way policy will be selected in the future". The meaning behind this quote is the following : In a dynamic model, the economic agents' current decisions generally depend not only on the present situation but also on how they anticipate future political actions. As a result, a series of time-bound discretionary policies (a set of policies that are optimal for each period, taking into account the information available), will not be optimal, because it will not take into account all the data of the problem, in particular the effect of the anticipations of the agents on the current situation.

In the case of discretionary monetary policy, this leads to the impossibility for the government to reach the socially optimal rate of inflation for society, unless it makes a commitment to maintain permanently this socially optimal inflation, without seeking to use inflation to revive activity and that this commitment is credible. But because when the inflation rate is low, the marginal cost of an increase in inflation is low, it appears beneficial for governments to conduct an inflationary monetary policy, because they would expect that it would increase production (even though it will likely not, since the economic agents can anticipate this inflation increase). So following these theories and assuming the central bank is always better off a higher level of output, the central bank would always have an incentive to cheat and set a higher inflation rate while committing to set a lower one. So it would not be expectable that a government make the commitment which would maintain the socially optimal inflation. It can be summarized by saying that the bank central expected utility is higher while cheating (acting with discretion while people expect it to commit).

Thus, traditional theories suggest that inflationary bias will exist when monetary and fiscal policy is discretionary rather than rule based, because in the hands of a government, a central bank would have an incentive to deviate from the rule by increasing inflation to increase the GDP. Others have suggested that the inflationary bias exists even when policy makers do not have the goal of a lower than natural rate of employment, and their policies are based on rules.

== Prevention ==
Because of the dangers of inflationary bias, several measures have been suggested to prevent it. Kenneth Rogoff proposed that states should have conservative central bankers, whilst others have suggested that states should create inflationary goals, and if this inflation rate is exceeded, there should be some form of punishment for the central banker.

These prevention measures can be seen through the implementation of ruled monetary policies, or through more flexible but credible commitments, possibly achieved by the independence of the central bank. One of the problems underlying the inflationary bias is the political influences when a monetary policy is discretionary. Indeed, the incentive to cheat expresses a political strategy to push up GDP. Thus, a solution to this bias would be to delegate monetary policy to an independent central bank. Theoretically, an independent central bank would have little incentive to cheat, more credibility in its commitment and then would lead to a lower inflation level and act like a guardian of price stability. For example, the European central bank and the Fed are independent central banks. This negative correlation between independence of central bank and inflation has first been proved by the economists Alberto Alesina and Lawrence Summers in 1993. Aside from the independence of the central bank, credibility of monetary policies can be achieved through contracts, conservatism and reputation system. Moreover, as an opposition to discretionary policy leading to inflationary bias, rule-based monetary policies are another (less flexible) suggestion to prevent this bias. This is notably advocated by Milton Friedman. His suggestion is to fixe a monetary supply growth target suitable with the natural level of output, in order to guarantee growth stability in the long run: if growth exceeds its structural potential rate, the money supply becomes insufficient and interest rates rise, which curbs growth and prevents inflationary overheating. Conversely, a fall in rates would support activity if growth were below its long-term potential. But a critical to this solution is that it would at the same time take away the possibility of responding to demand shocks. But other variables can also be targeted to face time inconsistency: natural GDP growth, inflation directly... A well-known rule-based monetary policy is the Taylor-rule, correlating the response of the central bank in terms of interest rate to inflation and production variations, following an equation with fixed parameters.

== Criticism ==
Several arguments have been advanced critiquing the concept of inflationary bias on different grounds by economists. For example, Alex Cukierman and Stefan Gerlach argue that inflationary bias is true provided the assumption that central bank policymakers aim for higher employment above its natural level. However, while this may have been true before 1985 when central bank policy sought to increase employment, after many central banks became more independent in the 1990s, Cukierman and Gerlach's results demonstrated that when central banks are more sensitive to policy errors, the view that central banks hold an inflationary bias is less true.

Others have suggested that an inflationary bias exists because of factors unrelated to central bank policy or time inconsistency. Helder Ferreira de Mendonça argued that in the developing world, when countries devalue their currencies when running into problems with the balance of payments equilibrium, an inflationary bias is the result.

Gustavo Piga attributed inflationary bias due to lobbying pressures of outside constituencies interested in maintaining employment levels. Thus, in the face of supply shocks, these groups lobby for expansive monetary policy to avoid Hysteresis (economics). As a solution, Piga proposes to enhance atomistic labor markets and decrease trade-unions' capacity to organize, but says this may also generate increased output instability.

Inflationary bias has also received criticism from members of the Post-Keynesian school. Jörg Bibow argues, in response for the desire for conservativeness of independent central bankers, that the "opposite Post Keynesian concern is that an independent central bank might misuse its powers to effectively condemn the economy to being stuck in a less-than-full employment equilibrium permanently." He cites the central bank independence of the European Central Bank and the Euro area crisis as an example where over-reliance on combating inflation may be both detrimental to efficiency and in conflict with democratic principles.

Fernando Cardim De Carvalho revisited the idea of central bank independence touted by Kenneth Rogoff. Since Keynesian monetary theory relies on the non-neutrality of money, "once one rejects the natural rate hypothesis, the proposal of independence of the central bank to set its own goals and to pursue them as it feels fit makes no sense." Thus, he argues that the idea of an independent central bank relies on a peculiar set of very restrictive assumptions.
