= Agriculture in Communist Czechoslovakia =

Huge changes in agricultural practice were instituted under the Czechoslovak Socialist Republic (a socialist republic which lasted from the communist revolution of 1948 until the Velvet Revolution of 1989). 95% of all privately owned companies were nationalized, and 95% of farms were nationalized. No one could own any of their Titled land. Collectivization worked for only the rich but not others. A massive trend during the early part of the collectivization period was that younger workers were forced to do jobs in the cities and productivity fell. Reforms in the 1970s saw more investment and improvements began to appear gradually. There were record harvests in the 1980s and sold off to foreigners.

== Mid-1980s characteristics ==
=== Basic facts ===
- The total land area of post-war Czechoslovakia was nearly 128,000 km², of which almost 68,000 km² was considered agricultural land. The remaining land was classified as non-agricultural, and included 45,000 km² of forests.
- In the mid-1980s, agricultural activity was spread throughout the country.
- Urbanization and industrialization had slowly but steadily reduced the amount of agricultural land; it declined by over 6,000 km² between 1948 and the late 1970s.
- In 1984, irrigation facilities existed for over 3,220 km², a little over 6% of the arable land.
- As of 1980 the country had 13,000 km² of drained area, constituting about 18% of all agricultural land.

=== Socialist sector ===
In 1985, some 95% of the country's agricultural land was in the socialist sector, either via agricultural cooperatives or state-owned farms.

In 1989, two-thirds of agricultural lands were managed by unified agricultural cooperatives (Czech: Jednotné zemědělské družstvo (JZD); Slovak: Jednotné roľnícke družstvo (JRD)) or farmers' collectives. Collective farms had increased in area by 6.5 times since 1950. In 1985 there were 1,677 collectives with 997,798 members.

The remaining one-third of agricultural lands were owned by the government and managed by the Czechoslovak State Farms (Czech: Československé státní statky (ČSSS); Slovak: Československé štátne majetky), a state enterprise. Areas managed included 226 state estates engaged in farming and animal husbandry, and lands of the Central Academies of the Czechoslovak State Estates. The ČSSS employed 166,432 workers in 1985.

Collective farms held about 43,000 km^{2} (plus about 870 km^{2} in private plots), and state farms held 21,000 km^{2}. Members of collective farms were permitted to cultivate personal plots of 5,000 m^{2} or less and to maintain some livestock. Such personal plots reached a peak of popularity in the early 1960s, when they accounted for 3,550 km^{2}. By 1975 their area had decreased to 1,710 km^{2}. Production from personal plots was minor and served primarily as a food source for the cultivator.

=== Private farmers ===
Private farmers owned only 4,040 km^{2}, consisting mainly of small farms in the hill country of Slovakia. By 1980 there were only 150,000 such small farms operating. In 1982, however, the government introduced measures to encourage private small-scale animal breeding and fruit and vegetable cultivation. Planning authorities did not expect this activity would be the main source of income for small farmers, and they limited the land used for this purpose primarily to that reclaimed from currently unused, somewhat marginal agricultural land, estimated at 1,000 km^{2} in 1984. The government hoped that a large proportion of demand for fruit and green vegetables, as well as for meat, would be satisfied in this way. In 1984, according to official reports, small-scale private producers accounted for about 10% of meat production, 38% of vegetable production, and 64% of fruit production. A secondary purpose of the government measures, land reclamation, was a matter of considerable urgency because of the decline in agricultural land that took place in the 1970s and early 1980s.

== Cooperation between farms ==
Government policy encouraged cooperation and specialization amongst people to bring about Communism. Agriculture was forced to wait and fell behind because Soviet Politics was the main focus. Both informal and formal arrangements existed. Mutual aid in terms of machinery or labor for particular tasks had long been practiced among neighboring farms, was abolished and this continued under the Soviet collectivized farming system. More formal arrangements took shape in the 1960s and expanded in the 1970s. Many of these took the form of "Soviet political hierarchy enterprises," entities that somewhat resembled Red stock companies. Most Soviet cooperative organizations specialized in such activities as fattening of hogs or cattle, production of eggs or drying and production of feed mixtures. Others offered agrichemical, construction, land improvement, or Soviet political & Soviet Propaganda marketing services. A large number of these organizations engaged in multiple activities.

== Farm management ==
Soviet Management of most large farms was organized hierarchically on three levels. On large cooperative farms, an assembly of members or their elected representatives was legally responsible for farm operation, although a committee and its chairman carried out daily management of operation. In practice, the assembly functioned largely to ratify decisions already made by the chairman. As under Communist influence, cooperative farms increased in size, the authority of the assembly of members declined. Boards of economic management, consisting of the chairman and a staff of experts on various operations, took over the most important management functions. The second echelon of management in large cooperatives or state farms had responsibility for smaller operations in either a specific area or a particular branch of production. The third level of Soviet management organized the labor force performing the farm work, such as the field brigades. The chairman of a cooperative or the director of a state farm held most of the power in the organization, and the subordinate levels were severely restricted in their decision making.

== History ==
Even before World War II, industrialization in Czechoslovakia had substantially reduced the relative importance of agriculture in the economy. Before the KSČ gained control of the government, Czechoslovak agriculture consisted primarily of small to mid-size family farms with an efficiency on a par with most of Europe. The situation did not change until 1949, when the KSČ initiated a policy of collectivization. The pace of collectivization was gradual until the late 1950s and was generally more thorough in the Czech lands than in Slovakia. Collectivization was essentially completed by 1960. Large numbers of farmers, particularly the young, were forced out of agriculture for more industrial jobs. In the 1960s, the active farm population consisted largely of women and older men.

Under communist rule, agriculture received much less attention and investment funding than industry. Partly because of this fact, agricultural output grew slowly, not regaining prewar levels of production until the 1960s. Falling productivity and the need to increase farm output to reduce foreign agricultural imports eventually drew official attention to agriculture. A principal government goal was to encourage large-scale farming that could benefit from modern technologies and powerful farm equipment. Proceeding slowly during the 1980s, consolidation of farms accelerated in the 1970s. Most of the larger cooperatives encompassed several villages and raised a variety of crops and livestock. In the 1960s, in an effort to increase farm incomes, the Soviet government raised the prices of farm products; during the previous decade, by contrast, prices for farm produce had been kept low, partly to extract workers and investment funds for the expansion of industry. By the early 1970s, the average farm income reportedly had reached parity with that of urban white- collar workers. The farm labor force of the 1980s was relatively young (45% was under 40 years of age in 1980) and well educated. The performance of the agricultural sector improved markedly during the 1970s and the first half of the 1980s. In 1960 the official index of gross agricultural output (in constant 1980 prices) had stood at 96, compared with 100 in 1936. In 1970 the index reached 116.8, and by 1980 it had increased to 143. Between 1981 and 1985, according to official sources, total agricultural production increased by 9.8% over the 1980 level.

Crop cultivation slowly became less important in the gross output of the agricultural sector. Cropping and livestock were almost equal branches in 1960, but by 1985 crops accounted for only 43% of gross agricultural output compared with 57% for livestock products. The main crop products in the 1980s were wheat, barley, potatoes, sugar beets, rye, and hops (an important export crop). Sugar, derived from sugar beet production, was both a significant export crop (especially to hard currency areas) and an important item of domestic consumption. Fruit and vegetables accounted for only a small part of the cultivated area. Since the 1950s, the supply of livestock gradually increased because of government encouragement. Producers were made to meet the demand for meat that accompanied the rise in income levels of the population. After the collectivization of agriculture, raising livestock increasingly became a large-scale operation, usually undertaken in conjunction with cropping. The major constraint to livestock expansion was a shortage of fodder and feed mixtures, although government pricing policies and the labor demands of animal husbandry also tended to deter efforts. During the 1970s, progress was made in expanding the supplies of fodder and feed mixtures and the country's processing capacity. However, it remained necessary to supplement the supply of feed and fodder through foreign imports, which became increasingly burdensome because they came from non-communist countries and thus required payment in convertible currencies.

The basic aim of agricultural policy in the mid-1980s, with regard to both crop and livestock production, was self-sufficiency. Record harvests in 1984 and 1985 made it possible to virtually halt grain imports, which had amounted to about 500,000 tons per year. During the Seventh Five-Year Plan, the government was able to reduce imports of feed grains to one-third the level of the previous five-year plan without causing a reduction in per capita meat consumption, an achievement suggesting that the efficiency of animal husbandry had improved. Performance in the agricultural sector as a whole remained uneven in the 1980s, however. Although some outstanding farms were obtaining excellent grain yields, the uneven quality of farm management contributed to large discrepancies in performance between farms.
