= Health and social welfare in Communist Czechoslovakia =

Health and social welfare in Communist Czechoslovakia can be defined by increases in maternity benefits, fluctuations in birthrate and abortion rate and decreases in factors such as infant mortality. The healthcare system featured an excess of bureaucracy, small-scale corruption, failing medical infrastructure, and outdated medical supply, while the social welfare system also fell behind in areas such as housing and nurseries.

== Characteristics ==
In the 1980s, Czechoslovakia had a comprehensive and universal system of social security under which everyone was entitled to free medical care and medicine. National health planning emphasized preventive medicine. Factory and local health care centers, first aid stations, and a variety of medical clinics supplemented hospitals and other inpatient institutions. The ratio of physicians to inhabitants had improved steadily, climbing from 1 per 745 in 1954 to 1 per 270 in 1989, although there were shortages of doctors in rural areas. The shift in the distribution of health resources in the 1960s and 1970s was dramatic; facilities were improved, and the number of health care personnel in Slovakia and rural areas increased in general. Despite the improvements, about 40% of all the medical equipment was obsolete, facilities were outdated and in short supply, the bureaucracy was excessive, and small bribery was widespread.

== Spas ==
Spas in Czechoslovakia were part of the health care system. In 1985 more than 460,000 people (5% of whom were children) stayed at the 35 spas in the Czech lands and 23 spas in Slovakia. Many spas had existed for centuries, such as Bardejov (since the 13th century) in Slovakia and Karlovy Vary in the Czech lands. Many of them specialized in the care and treatment of particular kinds of ailments. All had either mineral or hot springs, and some also offered mud treatments. In bygone days, the spas were frequented by European royalty and the wealthy, but in the 1980s they were open to all, including foreign tourists (who made up 10% of the patients in 1985). A number of people visited spas on vouchers provided by their trade unions.

== Life expectancy ==
In 1984 life expectancy in Czechoslovakia was 67 years for men and 75 years for women. In 1950 women's life expectancy was approximately 4.6 years longer than men's; by 1983 this difference had increased to nearly 7.5 years. While female life expectancy grew slightly, male life expectancy stagnated and in males aged 15, it increased. Infant mortality stood at 11.9 per 1,000 live births in 1988, down from 15.6 per 1,000 in 1975. As with medical care, the gap in life expectancy between the Czech lands and Slovakia was narrowed during this period.

== Pensions ==
In 1985 slightly more than one-quarter of the Czechoslovak population received some kind of pension; the elderly, the disabled, widows, and orphans were all entitled to assistance. Social security benefits (primarily retirement and disability) were equal for all wage earners. The average pension was less than Kcs1,000 per month (workers received an average pension of about Kcs 1,130, cooperative farmers about Kcs880, and independent farmers about Kcs720); this put pensioners among the lowest income earners. A substantial minority of the retired (23%) took up employment again to supplement their pensions.

== Maternity and childcare benefits ==
Women workers had a full complement of maternity and childcare benefits. Maternity leave (at 90% of full pay) was twenty-six weeks in the 1980s; an additional nine weeks were available for single mothers or for mothers having multiple births. Employers could not deny a woman's request for an additional year of unpaid leave for child rearing (without loss of job seniority). A system of child allowances and maternity grants also assisted women who took unpaid leave. Women were allowed three days of annual leave in case of illness within the family. There were substantial family allowances, in addition to direct grants, to single parents or families with handicapped children. An unmarried mother, widow, or divorced mother could not be fired if she had a child under three years of age; if she had children between three and fifteen years of age, her employer had to find her another job before dismissing her.

== Facilities for younger children ==
Nursery facilities for younger children were in very short supply; in 1984 they could accommodate less than 10% of children under five years of age. Beyond the sheer lack of space, nurseries were poorly distributed and were often concentrated in older centers rather than in new housing developments where young families were likely to reside. Kindergartens were in better supply, and a much higher percentage of children between the ages of three and six years attended these schools.

== Birthrate and abortion rate ==
High employment of women and inadequate services contributed to the decline in Czechoslovakia's birthrate in the 1960s. Live births during the decade averaged 16 per 1,000 inhabitants, a significant drop from the 1950s. By 1968 the fertility rate was under 2 children per woman (in comparison with almost 3 in the 1950s); at this rate the population would not replace itself. In the Czech lands, the population growth rate stood at its 1930s low; in Catholic Slovakia, it was the lowest on record. The government adopted a variety of explicitly pronatalist policies in the 1970s. Family allowances increased, especially for second and third children. By 1973 a family with three children received roughly one-third the average worker's salary in allowances. Birth grants doubled so that they were the equivalent of two to four weeks of family income. Low-interest loans to newlyweds were designed so that a portion of the principal was canceled with the birth of each child (Kcs 1,000 for the first and Kcs4,000 for each subsequent child). All told, the financial incentives were substantial. In addition, couples with children had priority on apartment waiting lists and were entitled to larger living quarters, no small inducement in the face of Czechoslovakia's chronic housing shortage. Pronatalist policies appear to have had a strong influence on population growth during the 1970s. The birthrate climbed from its 1968 low (14.9 per 1,000 inhabitants) to a peak of 19.9 per 1,000 inhabitants in 1974—one of the highest rates among industrial nations. Perhaps a quarter of this increase reflected the increase in the number of women of child-bearing age in the 1970s. After 1974, however, the birthrate steadily declined, falling to 14.5 by 1985. Figures indicated that a trend toward one-child families was emerging. The message seemed to be that after one decade the government's aid program was ineffective.

A major factor influencing the birthrate was the abortion rate. The number of abortions fluctuated between the 1950s and 1980s, dropping in the early 1960s and the early 1970s. In 1985 there were reportedly 144,712 abortions, or 39 abortions per 100 pregnancies (33.5 per 100 in the Slovak Socialist Republic and 42.1 per 100 in the Czech Socialist Republic). It has been suggested that abortion has remained one of the most favored means of birth control, despite the risks involved. A 1986 change in the abortion law (eliminating the panel needed to approve a request for an abortion) suggested that the regime was giving up in its efforts to reverse at least this aspect of the adverse demographic trends. In 1988 the abortion rate hit its peak, at 94 abortions for every 100 live pregnancies.

== Housing ==
Since statistics did not always provide a comparison between the numbers of households and existing housing units, the housing deficit remained difficult to gauge. A comparison of the number of marriages annually and construction of new 1 housing units between 1960 and 1975 shows that construction exceeded marriages only in 1975. The deficit was most acute in the 1960s, when an average of housing units was built for every 10 marriages; in 1985 the ratio rose to an average of 8.8 units per 10 marriages.

This approximation underestimated the housing deficit: it ignored divorces, the number of extended families living together who would have preferred separate housing, and the decay of old housing . Even waiting lists underestimated how inadequate housing was in the 1980s. Separate housing for single adults had such a low priority with planners that single adults found it difficult even to get on a housing list.

One of the factors contributing to the housing shortage was the low construction rate of rental housing. Major reasons for this were high inflation, high construction costs, and low (heavily subsidized) rents. In 1985 the average building cost for apartments rose to Kcs2,523 per square meter, and the average monthly rent—for the seventh consecutive year—was Kcs358. Construction of individual homes peaked in 1977 at 40,107 and decreased to 29,608 in 1985. Building a home privately was possible, but acquiring labor and materials was difficult and sometimes risky; it often meant borrowing machinery illegally or paying bribes for materials.

Despite substantial gains in the 1970s, Czechoslovakia entered the 1980s with a housing shortage that was likely to take years to remedy. In 1986 the government announced a slight cutback in new housing construction for the 1986–90 housing plan, further aggravating the situation.

== Bibliography ==
Albert, Alexa (1992). "Health Care in the Czech Republic: A System in Transition". JAMA. 267 (18): 2461–2466. doi:10.1001/jama.1992.03480180047016. ISSN 0098-7484.

Gawdiak, Ihor (1989). Czechoslovakia: a country study (PDF) (3rd ed.). Federal Research Division & Library of Congress. ISSN 1057-5294.

Hoffman, Lily M. (1997). "Professional Autonomy Reconsidered: The Case of Czech Medicine under State Socialism". Comparative Studies in Society and History. 39 (2): 346–372. doi:10.1017/S001041750002065X.

Moore, Bradley Matthys (2014). "Roy Porter Student Prize Essay For the People's Health: Ideology, Medical Authority and Hygienic Science in Communist Czechoslovakia". Social History of Medicine. 27 (1): 122–143. doi:10.1093/shm/hkt073.

Raffel, Marshall W.; Raffel, Norma K. (1992). "Czechoslovakia's changing health care system". Public Health Rep. 107 (6): 636–643. ISSN 0033-3549. PMC 1403713. PMID 1454975.

RFE Czechoslovak Unit, Blinken Open Society Archives, Budapest

This article incorporates text from this source, which is in the public domain. Country Studies. Federal Research Division.
