= Trade unions in Communist Czechoslovakia =

In the 1980s, trade unions were the largest of all Czechoslovak organizations. A single large federation, the Revolutionary Trade Union Movement (Revoluční odborové hnutí / Revolučné odborové hnutie, ROH), represented most wage earners (80 percent in 1983); to deny someone trade union membership was to imply extreme censure.

The role of trade unions under communism is distinctly different from the role it plays in Western society. Under communism, the unions serve as a "school of socialism" for the membership, the goal being to mobilize workers in pursuit of socialist production goals.

During the reform era before 1968, party reformers and workers alike criticized the Revolutionary Trade Movement as a bureaucratically unwieldy organization that was dominated by conservative party functionaries and served as a "conveyor belt" for official labor policy. Workers typically wanted smaller, more representative unions and a variety of economic benefits. More disturbing to the authorities was workers' propensity to vote party members out of union office and to demand a range of reforms. These reforms were not calculated to allay the fears of those who thought that the Communist Party of Czechoslovakia (KSČ) leading role was critical to socialist development.

Among the demands were the elimination of party and police files on workers (workers often achieved this end by simply burning the files) and the right of union and management representatives (not party officials) to decide personnel matters. Even more disturbing to the authorities was the tendency for workers' demands to be explicitly and unequivocally political. In major industrial centers, workers called for political pluralism, organized committees to defend freedom of the press, and voiced their support for The Two Thousand Words manifesto. The Writers' Union went so far as to suggest that they would field a slate of candidates for the National Assembly elections. It was not a turn of events congenial to those who preferred Soviet-style socialism. Not surprisingly, the unions were an early target of "normalization" efforts. An estimated 20 to 50 percent of the leadership was purged, and by the early 1970s the status quo had been effectively restored.

== Bibliography ==
Gawdiak, Ihor (1989). Czechoslovakia: a country study (PDF) (3rd ed.). Federal Research Division & Library of Congress (published 1987). ISSN 1057-5294.

This article incorporates text from this source, which is in the public domain. Country Studies. Federal Research Division.
