= List of songs recorded by Petr Spálený =

This is a list of songs recorded by singer and musician Petr Spálený.

== List ==
note. - song - duet - (composer / lyricist) - year - album

(h:/t:) - composer or lyricist has not been determined yet

  - cover versions of songs by other singers
- (work in progress)

== A ==
- Absolutní žena
- Alberta - (Bob Dylan / Petr Spálený) - 1970 - Petr v Lucerně (1972), Zvon šílencův (1996)
- Album
- Apolena
- A Sleep - Walking Fool - (Jan Spálený / Zdeněk Rytíř, Joy Turner) - Sail With Me (1972)
- Až mě andělé... (Píseň pro mou ženu) - (Petr Spálený / Josef Fousek) - 1986 - Až mě andělé (1990) - song was recorded live in Semafor in 1986
- Až mě andělé - (Petr Spálený / Josef Fousek) - Andělé (1993), Pomalu a potichu (1993)
- Až se jednou vzbudím smutnej - (Zdeněk Rytíř / Michal Horáček) - Jen mě vyzvi lásko na souboj (1994)
- Až se jednou vzbudím smutný - (Zdeněk Rytíř / Michal Horáček) - 1984 - Dům smíchu (1984)

== B ==
- Baby
- Balada o uvadlé růži - (Jan Spálený / Vladimír Poštulka) - 1971 - Dáma při těle (1971)
- Balalajka - (Pavel Krejča / Jiří Štaidl) - 1968 - Petr Spálený a Apollobeat (1969)
- Baletky
- Banana Daiquiri
- Bílá Lydie
- Bílej pták - (Petr Spálený / Michal Horáček) - 1987, 1994 - Jen mě vyzvi lásko na souboj (1994)
- Bird on the wire - (Leonard Cohen / Leonard Cohen) - 1994 - Jen mě vyzvi lásko na souboj (1994) - cover version of a song by Leonard Cohen
- Blaník
- Blázny živí Bůh - (Jan Spálený / Vladimír Poštulka) - 1970 - Zvon šílencův (1971, 1996)
- Blubbering Baby (Plakalo bejby) - (Jan Spálený / Jiří Štaidl, Joy Turner) - Sail With Me (1972)
- Blues - (Petr Spálený / Petr Spálený) - 1990 - Až mě andělé (1990)
- Bluesovej waltz
- Boxer
- Bude líp
- Byla lepší než já sám
- Byla to past (Gathering Dust) - (Doyle Holly / Zdeněk Rytíř) - 1971 - Petr v Lucerně (1972)
- Bylo fajn (Tonight Will Be Fine) - (Leonard Cohen / Petr Fleischer) - 1971 - Petr v Lucerně (1972), Best of Petr Spálený (1993)
- Být tu jen host - (Petr Spálený / Petr Spálený) - 1993 - Pomalu a potichu (1993)
- Bývala

== C ==
- Cikády
- Cítím ten kouř
- Co jsem zač (Conquistador) - (Gary Brooker / Jiří Štaidl) - 1968 - Petr Spálený a Apollobeat (1969), Motel Nonstop (1982)
- Co s tvou láskou - (Zdeněk Rytíř / Zdeněk Rytíř) - 1984 - Dům smíchu (1984)

== D ==
- Dálka
- Dalailama (Dalajláma) - (Jan Spálený / Vladimír Poštulka, Joy Turner) - Sail With Me (1972)
- Dalajláma - (Jan Spálený / Vladimír Poštulka) - 1971 - Dáma při těle (1971)
- Dálka mně vítá
- Dáma při těle (Four Kinds of Lonely) - (Lee Hazlewood / Pavel Vrba) - 1970 - Dáma při těle (1971), Petr v Lucerně (1972), Best of Petr Spálený (1993)
- Dávám růži bílou - (Jan Spálený / Vladimír Poštulka) - 1969 - Petr Spálený a Apollobeat (1969)
- Dávná báj - (Jan Spálený / Boris Janíček) - 1974 - Podoby (1975)
- Dávno nejsem kluk - (Pavel Krejča / Robert Filip) - 1984 - Dům smíchu (1984)
- Diamantová nevěsta - (Jan Spálený / Boris Janíček) - 1974 - Podoby (1975)
- Díky
- Díky vzdávám (Canta Libre) - (Neil Diamond / Pavel Vrba) - 1974 - Podoby (1975)
- Dítě štěstěny - Petr Spálený a Zdeněk Rytíř - (Petr Spálený / Zdeněk Rytíř) - 1979 - Dítě štěstěny (1980), Andělé (1993)
- Dívce Nam a Gam
- Dívka s vějířem
- Dlouhá bílá pláž
- Dlouhej mejdan (Long Gone) - (Neil Diamond / Pavel Vrba) - 1973 - Podoby (1975)
- Dlouho, dlouho spím (Holly Holy) - (Neil Diamond / Pavel Vrba) - 1971 - Petr v Lucerně (1972), Best of Petr Spálený (1993)
- Dobře utajený mužný zjev - (Jan Spálený / Petr Fleischer) - 1969 - Zvon šílencův (1971, 1996)
- Domácí lékař - (Petr Spálený / Zdeněk Rytíř) - 1979 - Dítě štěstěny (1980)
- Dona Maria - (Václav Zahradník / Pavel Vrba) - 1974 - Podoby (1975)
- Dýmka je zázrak - (Jan Spálený / Pavel Vrba) - 1970 - Zvon šílencův (1996)

== E ==
- El Alamein

== F ==
- Fata morgana - (Petr Spálený / Petr Spálený) - 1987 - Pomalu a potichu (1993)
- Four Kinds Of Lonely (Dáma při těle) - (Lee Hazlewood / Pavel Vrba, Lee Hazlewood) - Sail With Me (1972)

== G ==
- Games People Play - (Joe South / Joe South) - Sail With Me (1972)
- Good Bye Mary Lou

== H ==
- Haló taxi
- Hotel Blues
- Houpací síť
- Hráč (The Gambler) - (Don Schlitz / Zdeněk Rytíř) - Andělé (1993)
- Hroší kůže - (Pavel Krejča / Vladimír Poštulka) - 1968 - Petr Spálený a Apollobeat (1969)

== CH ==
- Chci mít víc než tamty - (Pavel Krejča/ Michal Horáček) - 1985 - Jen mě vyzvi lásko na souboj (1994)
- Chci se vrátit domů
- Chlap ze stránky 5 - (Petr Spálený / Miroslav Černý) - 1979 - Dítě štěstěny (1980)

== I ==
- I Am Very Grateful - (Pavel Krejča / Pavel Vrba, Joy Turner) - Sail With Me (1972)
- If I Were A Carpenter - (Tim Hardin / Tim Hardin) - Sail With Me (1972)
- Irma Jackson

== J ==
- Já bych chtěl syna mít - (Petr Spálený / Petr Spálený) - 1984 - Dům smíchu (1984)
- Já chci plout s Magdalenou - (Jan Spálený / Vladimír Poštulka) - 1971 - Dáma při těle (1971)
- Já ho jen od vidění znám - Petr Spálený a Zdeněk Rytíř - (Petr Spálený / Zdeněk Rytíř) - 1981 - Motel Nonstop (1982)
- Já mám rád jenom rokenrol - (Pavel Krejča / Petr Spálený) - 1984 - Dům smíchu (1984)
- Já měl už dávno plout
- Já nikdy nebyl dobrej
- Já se neztratím - (Pavel Krejča / Vladimír Poštulka) - 1981 - Motel Nonstop (1982)
- Já tě měla moc ráda - (Petr Spálený / Petr Spálený) - 1984 - Dům smíchu (1984)
- Já ti mávám dál - (Jan Spálený / Petr Fleischer) - 1970 - Zvon šílencův (1971, 1996)
- Já tiše říkám díky - (Pavel Krejča / Pavel Vrba) - 1971 - Dáma při těle (1971)
- Já tu píseň znám
- Já už neříkám (Tin Soldier Man) - (Ray Davies / Petr Spálený) - 1971 - Petr v Lucerně (1972)
- Já věřím tvým snům (I Believe In You) - (Roger Cook / Zdeněk Rytíř) - 1981 - Motel Nonstop (1982)
- Jackpot
- Jak ty koně pěkně jdou (Couldn't Do Nothing Right) - (Gary P Nunn / Jan Spálený) - 1994 -Jen mě vyzvi lásko na souboj (1994)
- Jako královně páže
- Je líp, je hůř
- Je to trest - (Petr Spálený / Zdeněk Rytíř) - 1979 - Dítě štěstěny (1980), Andělé (1993)
- Je zázrak, že tě mám - (Jan Spálený / Miroslav Černý) - Best of Petr Spálený (1993)
- Jen mě vyzvi lásko na souboj (Longer Boats) - (Cat Stevens / Boris Janíček) - 1974 - Podoby (1975), Jen mě vyzvi lásko na souboj (1994)
- Jezdím na páru
- Josefína - (Jan Spálený / Boris Janíček) - 1973 - Podoby (1975), Best of Petr Spálený (1993)

== K ==
- Kam dáma jednou vstoupí
- Kam jít svou tmou
- Kam se lásky podějí ?
- Kamarád
- Každý muž musí někdy své ženě sbohem dát
- Kde jsou hejna - (Petr Spálený / Josef Fousek) - Pomalu a potichu (1993)
- Kde jsou hejna dobrejch přátel - (Petr Spálený / Josef Fousek) - 1987 - Andělé (1993)
- Kde jsou honoráře
- Kdyby mě někdo štíp
- Kdyby tady byla ta co tu není
- Kdybych já byl kovářem (If I Were A Carpenter) - (Tim Hardin / Pavel Vrba) - 1969 - Dáma při těle (1971), Best of Petr Spálený (1993)
- Když dozrálo víno (Tell Laura I Love Her) - (Roy Peterson / Jiří Štaidl) - 1967 - Petr Spálený and Apollobeat (1969)
- Když ji potkáš (If You See Her) - (Mickey Newbury / Zdeněk Rytíř) - 1979 - Dítě štěstěny (1980), Andělé (1993)
- Když už tě nevídám - (Petr Spálený / Petr Spálený) - 1984 - Dům smíchu (1984)
- Když jsme byli malí kluci
- King Of The Road
- Klíč od varhan - (Jan Spálený / Rostislav Černý) - 1968 - Petr Spálený and Apollobeat (1969)
- Klonovaná žena
- Kočičí knír - (Jan Spálený / Petr Fleischer) - 1970 - Zvon šílencův (1971, 1996)
- Kolej Albertov - (Zdeněk Rytíř / Zdeněk Rytíř) - 1979 - Dítě štěstěny (1980)
- Kolombína - (Jan Spálený / Jana Žížalová) - 1968 - Petr Spálený and Apollobeat (1969)
- Komická dvojka - (Petr Spálený / Petr Spálený) - 1984 - Dům smíchu (1984)
- Kopec - (Jan Spálený / Miroslav Černý) - 1970 - Dáma při těle (1971)
- Kousky snů - (Petr Spálený / Petr Spálený) - 1981 - Motel Nonstop (1982)
- K tvým nohám (Pour Man) - (Lee Hazlewood / Petr Spálený) - 1969 - Petr Spálený and Apollobeat (1969)

== L ==
- Laciný triky
- Lady - (Petr Spálený / Petr Spálený) - 1981 - Motel Nonstop (1982), Andělé (1993), Pomalu a potichu (1993)
- Lalalalalalalalalá (Such A Funny Nights) - (Richard George Adams / Evangelos Papathanassiou, Petr Spálený) - 1971 - Petr v Lucerně (1972)
- Laredo (Streets Of Laredo) - (traditional / Michal Bukovič) - 1990 - Andělé (1993)
- Láska
- Lásko, je tě málo
- Lenka
- Lesní víla - (Jan Spálený / Petr Spálený) - 1970 - Zvon šílencův (1971, 1996)
- Lída
- Lidi mám rád - (Martin Kratochvíl/ Petr Spálený) - 1987 - Jen mě vyzvi lásko na souboj (1994)
- Línou kůži mám
- Loď bláznů

== M ==
- Má sestra se vdává
- Má, dva roky má (Loop Di Love) - (traditional, adapted by Hans-Michael Sczypior / Petr Spálený) - Best of Petr Spálený (1993)
- Mafie
- Málo jsem ženský znal (Child Song) - (Neil Diamond / Petr Spálený) - 1971 - Petr v Lucerně (1972), Best of Petr Spálený (1993)
- Mám rád dívky kávový
- Mária
- Marilyn - (Petr Spálený / Josef Fousek) - 1990 - Pomalu a potichu (1993)
- Marnou bitvu svádíš
- Mečíky - (Jan Spálený / Jana Žížalová) - 1968 - Zvon šílencův (1996)
- Medvěd - (Jan Spálený / Petr Spálený) - 1974 - Podoby (1975)
- Mistr Jan na hranici - (Petr Spálený / Petr Spálený) - 1990 - Až mě andělé (1990), Andělé (1993)
- Mistr zkratky - (Zdeněk Rytíř / Zdeněk Rytíř) - 1984 - Dům smíchu (1984)
- Mladá matka s děckem - (Jan Spálený / Boris Janíček) - 1974 - Podoby (1975)
- Mně se zdá (Break My Mind) - Petr Spálený a Miluše Voborníková - (John D. Loudermilk / Petr Rada) - Best of Petr Spálený (1993)
- Modrá píseň - (Jan Spálený / Petr Fleischer) - 1970 - Zvon šílencův (1971, 1996)
- Montgomery
- Mosazná klika - (Petr Spálený / Josef Fousek) - 1990 - Až mě andělé (1990), Pomalu a potichu (1993)
- Motel Nonstop (Irma Jackson) - (Merle Haggard / Miroslav Černý) - 1981 - Motel Nonstop (1982), Andělé (1993)
- Můj děda by řek´ - (Jan Spálený / Eduard Pergner) - 1971 - Petr v Lucerně (1972)
- Můj dům - (Jan Spálený / Jana Žížalová) - 1969 - Petr Spálený a Apollobeat (1969), Zvon šílencův (1996)
- Můj vodopád
- Muž dal jména všem zvířatům
- Muž s velkým M - (Bohuslav Ondráček / Robert Filip) - 1984 - Dům smíchu (1984)

== N ==
- Náhodou jsme tu chvíli
- Na hodný holky mám smůlu
- Na hradě nestraší
- Na Lužnici
- Na to můžeš vzít jed - (Petr Spálený / Miroslav Černý) - 1981 - Motel Nonstop (1982), Andělé (1993)
- Na týhle planetě už zůstanu
- Necítím se sám - (Petr Spálený / Petr Spálený) - 1980 - Andělé (1993)
- Nejlepší je těšení
- Nejraději spím
- Nejsem žádnej mnich
- Nekráčím
- Nelekej se (Satin Sheets) - (W. A. Ramsey / Miroslav Černý) - 1979 - Dítě štěstěny (1980)
- Nevnímám rosu průhlednou (Morning Dew) - (Bonnie Dobson / Pavel Vrba) - 1974 - Podoby (1975)
- Nevyzpytatelná cesta - (Petr Spálený/ Michal Horáček) - 1987, 1994 - Jen mě vyzvi lásko na souboj (1994)
- Nic kromě tvý lásky
- Noční můra - (Petr Spálený/ Michal Horáček) - 1987, 1994, 1998 - Jen mě vyzvi lásko na souboj (1994)
- Noční show nemilovaných

== O ==
- Obraz v kaluži (I Walking In the Rain) - (Tim Hardin / Pavel Vrba) - 1968 - Podoby (1975)
- Obyčejná žena
- Obyčejný muž - (Petr Spálený / Zdeněk Rytíř) - 1979 - Dítě štěstěny (1980), Andělé (1993)
- Oči koní - (Petr Spálený / Josef Fousek) - 1990 - Až mě andělé (1990), Andělé (1993), Pomalu a potichu (1993)
- Oči ztracených dětí
- Od místa k místu
- Ochraňuj tu píseň - (Ivan Štědrý / Pavel Vrba) - 1974 - Podoby (1975)
- On zůstal sám - (neznámy author / neznámy author) - 1994 - Jen mě vyzvi lásko na souboj (1994)
- Ona je démant

== P ==
- Pánská jízda - (Pavel Krejča / Zdeněk Rytíř) - 1979 - Dítě štěstěny (1980)
- Peggy - (Pavel Krejča / Zdeněk Rytíř) - 1979 - Dítě štěstěny (1980), Andělé (1993)
- Pipe Smoke Is Magic - (Jan Spálený / Pavel Vrba, Joy Turner) - Sail With Me (1972)
- Píseň pro melofon - (Pavel Krejča / Vladimír Poštulka) - 1971 - Dáma při těle (1971)
- Píseň starého mládence - (Jan Spálený / Petr Spálený) - 1970 - Zvon šílencův (1971, 1996)
- Plakalo bejby - (Pavel Krejča / Jiří Štaidl) - 1967 - Petr Spálený a Apollobeat (1969), Best of Petr Spálený (1993)
- Podivný hry lidí (The Games People Play) - (Joe South / Vladimír Poštulka) - Best of Petr Spálený (1993)
- Podoba - (Jan Spálený / Eduard Pergner) - 1974 - Podoby (1975)
- Pohoda Vánoc - (Petr Spálený / Josef Fousek) - 1987 - Andělé (1993), Pomalu a potichu (1993)
- Pojď
- Pop music
- Popírám - (Jan Spálený / Petr Fleischer) - 1969 - Zvon šílencův (1971, 1996)
- Pořád ti to sluší
- Poslední hippie
- Prachy
- Prázdný kamión - (Petr Spálený / Zdeněk Rytíř) - 1979 - Dítě štěstěny (1980), Andělé (1993)
- Přijď dříve než zlatý slunce - (Pavel Krejča / Jana Žížalová) - 1968 - Petr Spálený a Apollobeat (1969)
- Proč jsem tady
- Proměnlivá
- Promiň - (Petr Spálený / Miroslav Černý) - 1981 - Motel Nonstop (1982)
- Prosím tě, stůj
- Pudl
- Půlnoční malá vernisáž

== R ==
- Raději zpívám - (Jan Spálený / Zdeněk Rytíř) - 1974 - Podoby (1975)
- Ránem (Run Boy Run) - (Lee Hazlewood / Petr Spálený, Boris Janíček) - 1974 - Podoby (1975)
- Rezavý vlasy
- Rošťák
- Rozhodni sám

== S ==
- Sail With Me, Magdalena (Já chci plout s Magdalenou) - (Jan Spálený / Vladimír Poštulka, Joy Turner) - Sail With Me (1972)
- Sen o jednom ostrově - (Jan Spálený / Vladimír Poštulka) - 1970 - Dáma při těle (1971)
- Sen o New Orleans
- Slepá ulice
- Slib mi dej
- Smích
- Smrt a dívka (Der Tod und das Mädchen) - Petr Spálený a Miluše Voborníková - (Franz Schuber / Pavel Vrba) - 1976 - Jen mě vyzvi lásko na souboj (1994)
- So-Long, Good-Bye - (Jan Spálený / Vladimír Poštulka, Joy Turner) - Sail With Me (1972)
- Stáňa - (Pavel Krejča / Petr Spálený) - 1979 - Dítě štěstěny (1980)
- Staré dluhy - (Pavel Krejča / Miroslav Černý) - 1981 - Motel Nonstop (1982)
- Starej vetešník
- Starožitník - (Jan Spálený / Boris Janíček) - 1974 - Podoby (1975)
- Sto třicet slok (I'd Rather Be Dead) - (Harry Nilsson / Boris Janíček) - 1974 - Podoby (1975)
- Střípky a oblázky - (Petr Fleischer / Petr Fleischer) - 1969 - Zvon šílencův (1996)
- Svět se koulí dál - (Petr Spálený / Petr Spálený) - 1987 - Andělé (1993), Pomalu a potichu (1993)
- Sylvie nemá čas (Sylvia's Mother) - (Shel Silverstein / Zdeněk Rytíř) - Best of Petr Spálený (1993)

== Š ==
- Šedesátý léta

== T ==
- Tahle píseň věčná zdá se
- Tak, co teď s tím? (Wait Till Next Year) - (Randy Newman / Pavel Vrba) - 1974 - Podoby (1975), Jen mě vyzvi lásko na souboj (1994)
- Takový cesty mám
- Tak píšu psaní - (Pavel Krejča / Petr Spálený) - 1981 - Motel Nonstop (1982)
- Táňo, na shledanou - (Jan Spálený / Vladimír Poštulka) - 1971 - Dáma při těle (1971), Best of Petr Spálený (1993)
- Teď k sobě ležíme zády
- Ten den kdy to vzdám
- Ten den kdy to vzdám
- The Charms Of Joy - (Jan Spálený / Pavel Vrba, Joy Turner) - Sail With Me (1972)
- The Mountain (Kopec) - (Jan Spálený / Miroslav Černý, Joy Turner) - Sail With Me (1972)
- To chtěl bych já
- To jsem říkat asi neměl - (Petr Spálený / Petr Spálený) - 1984 - Dům smíchu (1984)
- To vadí (Ob-La-Di, Ob-La-Da) - (Paul McCartney / Pavel Vrba) - 1969 - Petr Spálený a Apollobeat (1969), Best of Petr Spálený (1993)
- Tóny rozdávám
- Trápím se, trápím (The Death of The Clown) - (Ray Davies / Petr Spálený) - 1970 - Dáma při těle (1971), Best of Petr Spálený (1993)
- Tři klauni
- Trojzub Neptunův
- Tvrdohlavá žena

== U ==
- U hrobu božího bojovníka - (Jan Spálený / Boris Janíček) - 1974 - Podoby (1975)
- U Rotta - (Petr Spálený / Josef Fousek) - 1990 - Až mě andělé (1990), Pomalu a potichu (1993)
- Uhozená ukolébavka
- Úsměv
- Úsměv je tiché pohlazení
- Ústa dívky Dáši - (Jan Spálený / Pavel Vrba) - 1971 - Petr v Lucerně (1972), Best of Petr Spálený (1993)
- Útěk století

== V ==
- V jednu chvíli
- V ZOO
- Včera
- Velký muž serenád
- Víc už neslibuj (Don't Make Promises) - (Tim Hardin / Jan Spálený) - 1994 - Jen mě vyzvi lásko na souboj (1994)
- Viděl jsem tisíc hospod
- Vím, vím
- Vlaky v mé hlavě - (Jan Spálený / Pavel Vrba) - 1974 - Podoby (1975)
- Všechno je lepší než být sám - (Petr Spálený / Zdeněk Rytíř) - 1981 - Motel Nonstop (1982)
- Všechno, co ti můžu dát
- Všichni už jsou za vodou

== Z ==
- Zasněnej bernardýn - (Jan Spálený / Pavel Vrba) - 1970 - Zvon šílencův (1971, 1996)
- Zbrojnoš - (Jan Spálený / Miroslav Černý) - 1970 - Dáma při těle (1971), Best of Petr Spálený (1993)
- Zdá se mi málo
- Zimní krajina v měsíčním světle - (Jan Spálený / Boris Janíček) - 1974 - Podoby (1975)
- Zlý znamení (The Beat Goes On) - Petr Spálený a Yvonne Přenosilová - (Sonny Bono / Jiří Štaidl) - Best of Petr Spálený (1993)
- Zpátky k nám (In the Pines) - Petr Spálený a Jan Spálený - (tradicional /Petr Spálený/Jan Spálený) - 1994 - Jen mě vyzvi lásko na souboj (1994)
- Zrcadlo - (Jan Spálený / Boris Janíček) - 1974 - Podoby (1975)
- Ztracen v domě smíchu - (Zdeněk Rytíř / Michal Horáček) - 1984 - Dům smíchu (1984)
- Zvon šílencův - (Jan Spálený / Petr Fleischer) - 1970 - Zvon šílencův (1971, 1996)
