= Zdeněk Rytíř =

Czech composer, lyricist, and musician (1944–2013)

- Born: 11 April 1944; Tábor, Protectorate of Bohemia and Moravia
- Died: 2 October 2013 (aged 69); Prague, Czech Republic
- Genres: Pop; country; rock
- Occupations: Composer; lyricist; musician; singer
- Instruments: Vocals; guitar; bass; keyboards; banjo; harmonica
- Labels: Supraphon
- Spouses: Evelyna Steimarová; Helena Rytířová

Zdeněk Rytíř (11 April 1944 – 2 October 2013) was a Czech composer, lyricist, multi-instrumentalist, and singer born in Tábor, at the time part of the Nazi-occupied Protectorate of Bohemia and Moravia. He died of a heart attack at age 69, in Prague.

== Biography ==
=== Music ===
Zdeněk Rytíř was born on 11 April 1944 in Tábor, which at the time was part of the Nazi-occupied Protectorate of Bohemia and Moravia. During his studies at Charles University, he wrote poetry and played bass guitar and harmonica in several bands. He began writing lyrics professionally as a member of the group Mefisto.

Rytíř wrote lyrics for songs performed by numerous Czech artists and bands, including Pavel Bobek, Helena Vondráčková, Václav Neckář, Petr Spálený, Michal Tučný, Olympic, Karel Gott, Lenka Filipová, Hana Zagorová, Jitka Zelenková, and ASPM among others. He additionally wrote Czech lyrics for several songs by Bob Dylan, including "Like a Rolling Stone", later made famous by Petr Kalandra, and "The Times They Are a-Changin'", sung by Marta Kubišová.

=== Personal life ===
Rytíř was in a relationship with singer Helena Vondráčková until 1969. He later married actress Evelyna Steimarová, with whom he has a daughter, actress Vendula Prager-Rytířová. His second wife, Helena Rytířová, is also an actress. They have two children together: Zdeněk Rytíř Jr. and Alena Rytířová.

=== Illness and death ===
After a long illness, Rytíř died of a heart attack on 2 October 2013 in Prague, aged 69.

== Selected discography ==
- Michal Tučný, Zdeněk Rytíř & Tučňáci – Jak to doopravdy bylo s Babinským
- Konec básníků v Čechách – soundtrack (1993)
- Nautilus Zdeňka Rytíře – compilation of songs by Zdeněk Rytíř (2004)
