= Eva Jiřičná =

Czech architect and designer (born 1939)

Prof. Eva Jiřičná CBE RA
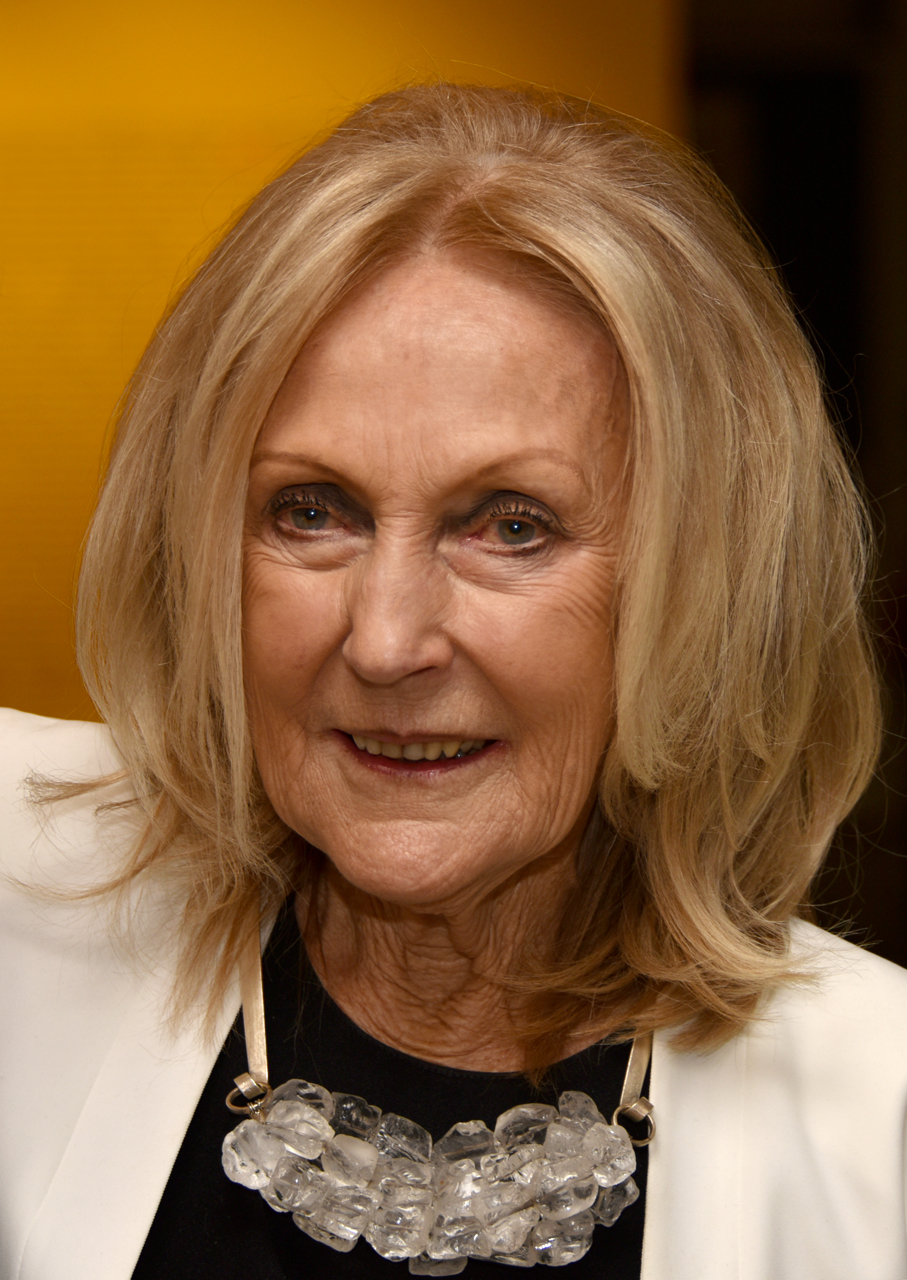
- Eva Jiřičná (2019)
- Born: 3 March 1939 (age 87); Zlín, Czechoslovakia
- Education: Czech Technical University in Prague, Academy of Fine Arts, Prague
- Occupation: Architect
- Awards: CBE, Jane Drew Prize, Honorary Silver Medal of Jan Masaryk
- Practice: Eva Jiricna Architects, AI DESIGN

Eva Jiřičná (born 3 March 1939) is a Czech architect and designer, active in London and Prague. She is the founder of the architectural atelier Eva Jiricna Architects, operating in Britain (at first as Jiřičná Kerr Associates) from 1982 to 2017 and a co-founder of AI DESIGN, that she opened in 1999 together with Petr Vágner. She is known for her attention to detail and work of a distinctly modern style, and for her glass staircases.

Since 1996 she has been the head of the Department of Architecture at the Academy of Arts, Architecture and Design in Prague. In 2007, she was President of the International Commission levying a construction project of the new building of the National Library in Letná, Prague.

== Biography ==
=== Childhood and studies ===
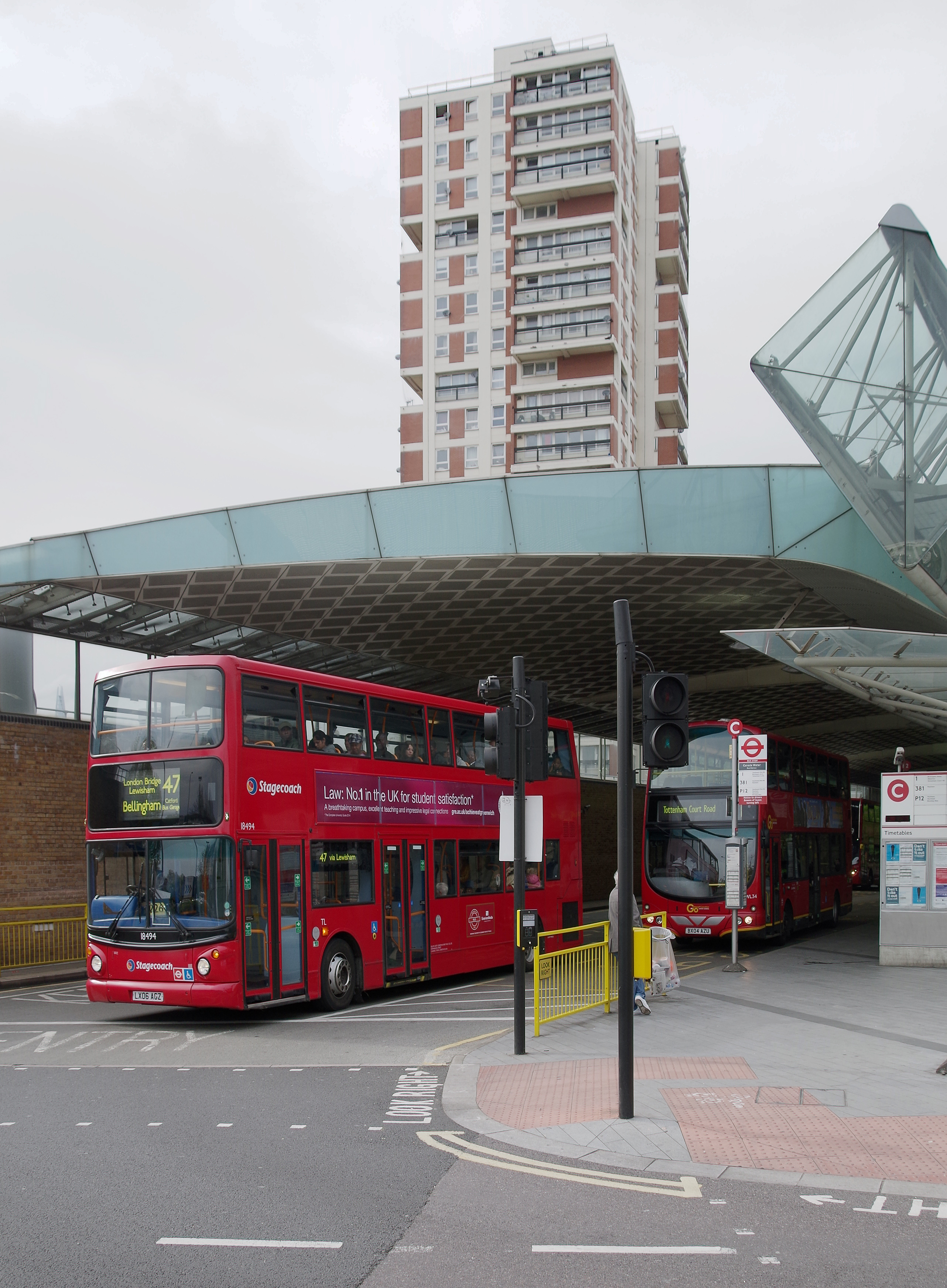
Canada Water Bus Terminal, London 1999

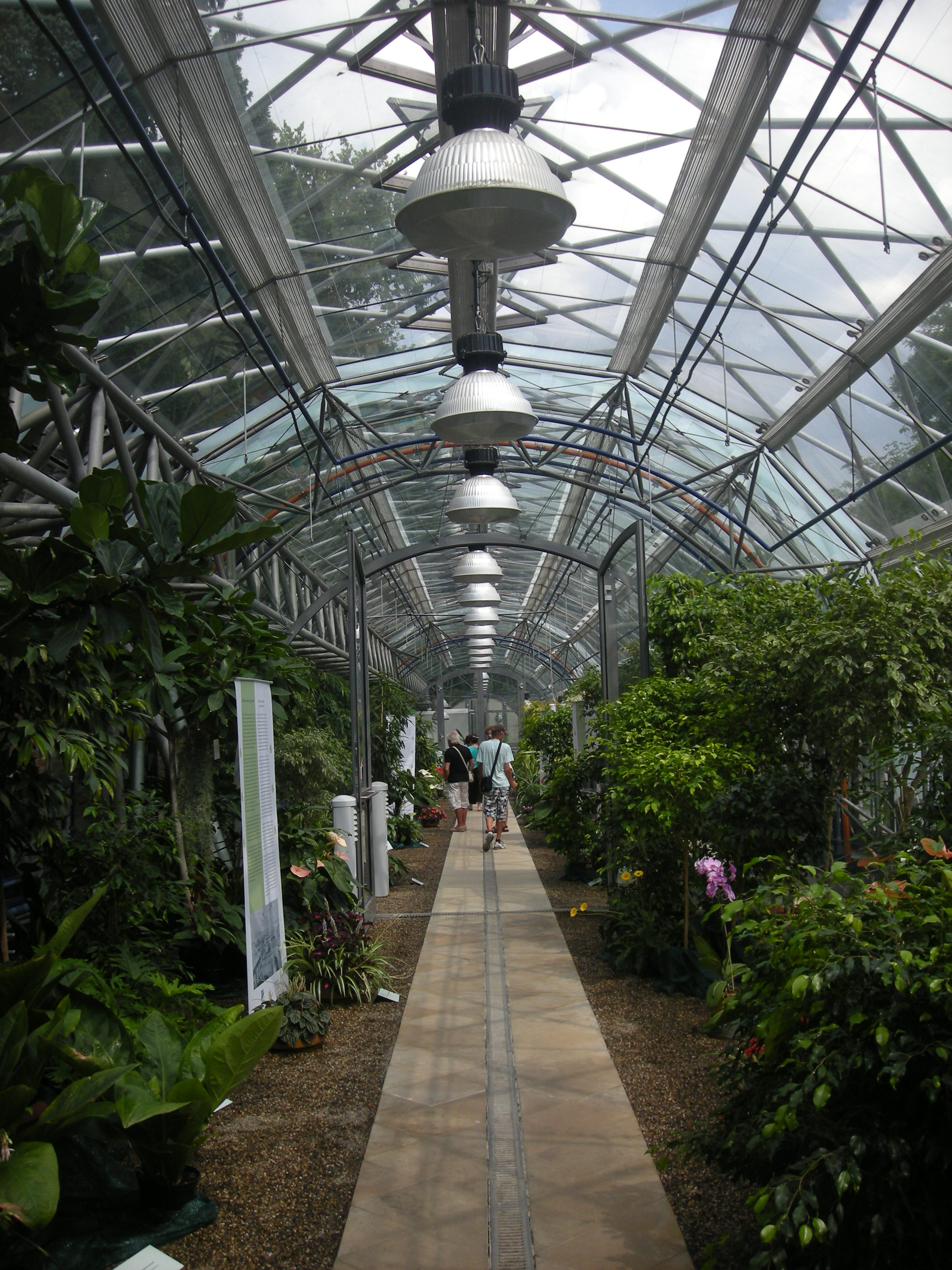
Orangery at Prague Castle, Prague 1998

Jiřičná was born on 3 March 1939 in Zlín in the Second Czechoslovak Republic, twelve days before it became the Protectorate of Bohemia and Moravia under German occupation. She lived in Zlín till the age of four, when her whole family moved to Prague. She studied architecture at the Czech Technical University in Prague until 1962 and also at the Academy of Fine Arts in Prague – as a pupil of Jaroslav Fragner – where she earned an MA in 1963. After finishing school, she got her first job in state administration at ÚBOK – Ústav bytové a oděvní kultury (Institute of housing and clothing culture).

=== Great Britain ===
In 1968, Jiřičná gained a temporary work placement in London, working as an architect with the Greater London Council on social housing projects. After the Warsaw Pact invasion of Czechoslovakia in August 1968, her travel permit was annulled by the Czechoslovak Ministry of Interior, so that she couldn't come back. She decided to stay in the United Kingdom and a year later, she became an associate in the Louis de Soissons Partnership. Here, she spent eight years working on design and construction of the Brighton Marina. In 1976, she became a British citizen. By the end of 1980 she had formed her own practice alongside David Hodges. From here, she began to be recognized for her work in architectural competitions with her business partner. During this time, Jiřičná also shifted from technical architectural projects to interior design assignments, but still incorporated the complexities of her architectural background. Jiřičná continued to gain recognition in the mid-eighties. She met fashion designer and entrepreneur Joseph Ettedgui, designing several of his Joseph retail shops in London, and eventually his own Knightsbridge flat. Her work on the interior design of Lloyd's Headquarters in London made her really noticed. She was later asked by Steve Jobs to work on the Apple store concept, but ultimately they went their separate ways. By 1985 she had formed Jiřičná Kerr Associates with Kathy Kerr, a practice which is still operating, now under the name of Eva Jiřičná Architects. Her business of ten team members works on projects including architecture, interior design, and furniture design.

=== Czech Republic ===
After the Velvet Revolution, she began working on projects in the Czech Republic again. Jiřičná designed new Congress Centre and a new faculty building of the Tomas Bata University in her hometown of Zlín. She has also designed many new projects in Prague, including the Main hall of Komerční banka, the reconstruction of St. Anna Church in Old Town or the hotly contested project for replacing the old Central Telelecommunication Building near Žižkov freight railway station. Since 2019, Jiřičná has been the head of CBRE Art of Space Awards committee, judging the aesthetics of new office, retail and industrial spaces. In early 2021, Jiřičná's AI DESIGN won the tender for reconstruction of Věžák Tower, one of the dominants of Ostrava.

National Life Stories conducted an oral history interview (C467/127) with Eva Jiřičná in 2015–16 for its Architects Lives' collection held by the British Library.

== Style ==
She is an architect and interior designer, best known for her innovative use of industrial materials in retail and commercial spaces. Eva Jiřičná creatively fused her engineering and architecture background with interior design. By utilizing lighting effects and material characteristics, she maximized space in an intriguing manner. The understanding of architecture is perhaps responsible for this, Jiřičná was able to transform the sometimes unmanageable spaces of London's old buildings into usable area. While she gained recognition with architectural projects, her store design commissions were large contributions to her profession. She demonstrated how retail design could be treated with architectural concepts, strengthening the image of interior design. Jiřičná is also open about her strong dislike for wood and cushions.

Despite being on friendly terms with Zaha Hadid, Jiřičná also criticized her work, saying her "buildings are like statues of some kind, that only care about their own outer expression".

== Projects ==
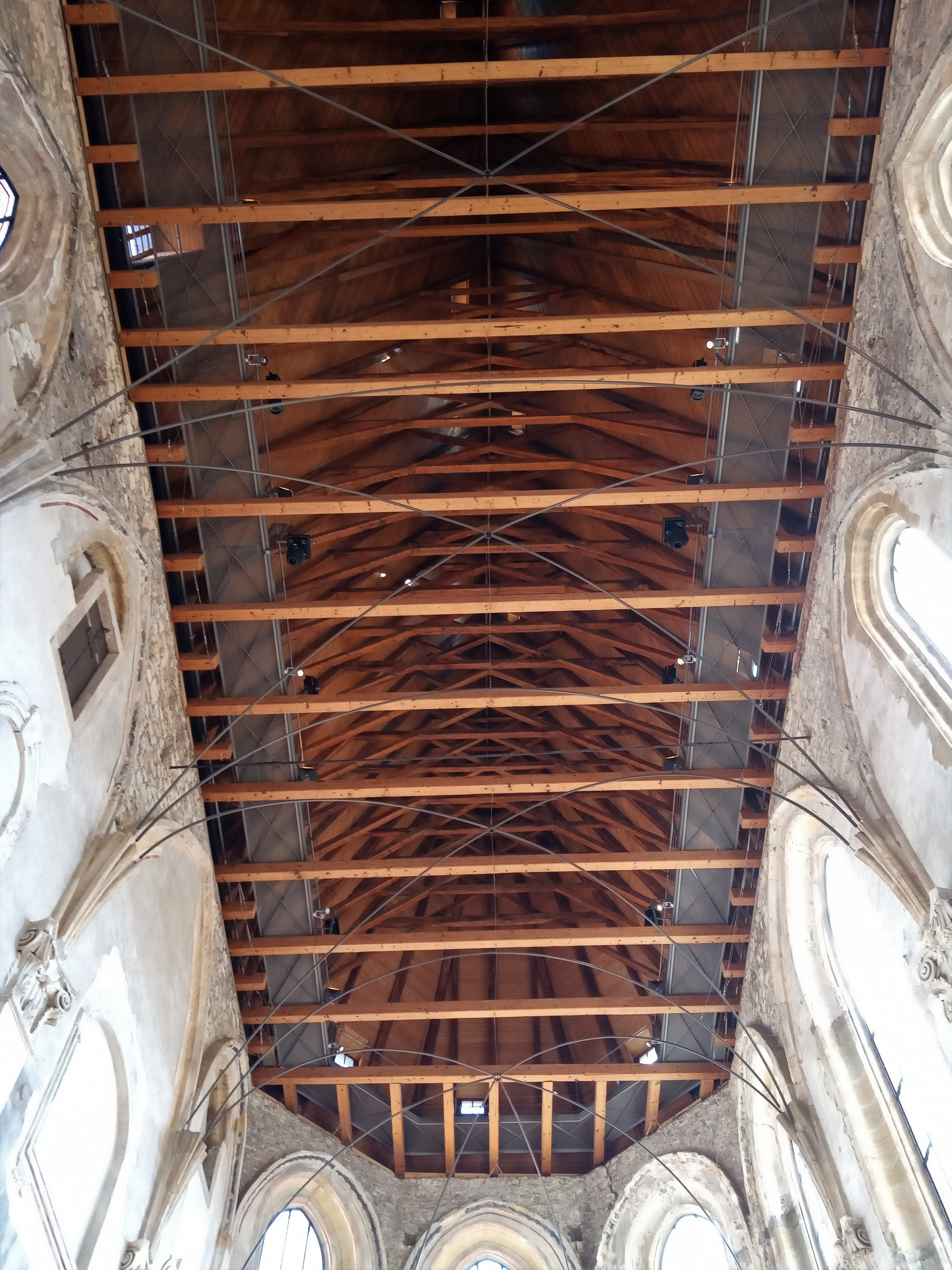
Reconstruction of St. Anna Church, Old Town, Prague 2004

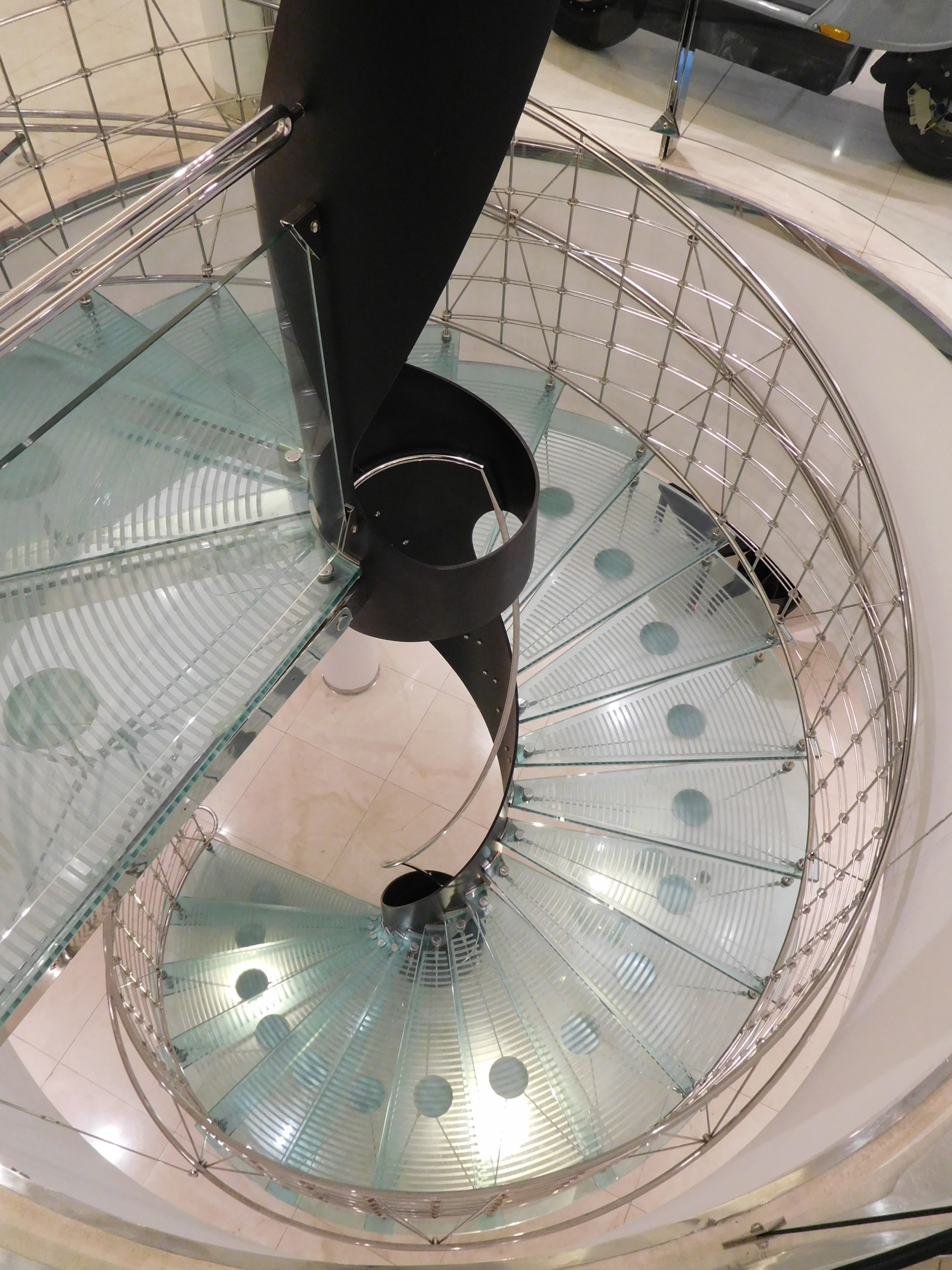
Glass staircase of Hotel Josef, Prague 2015

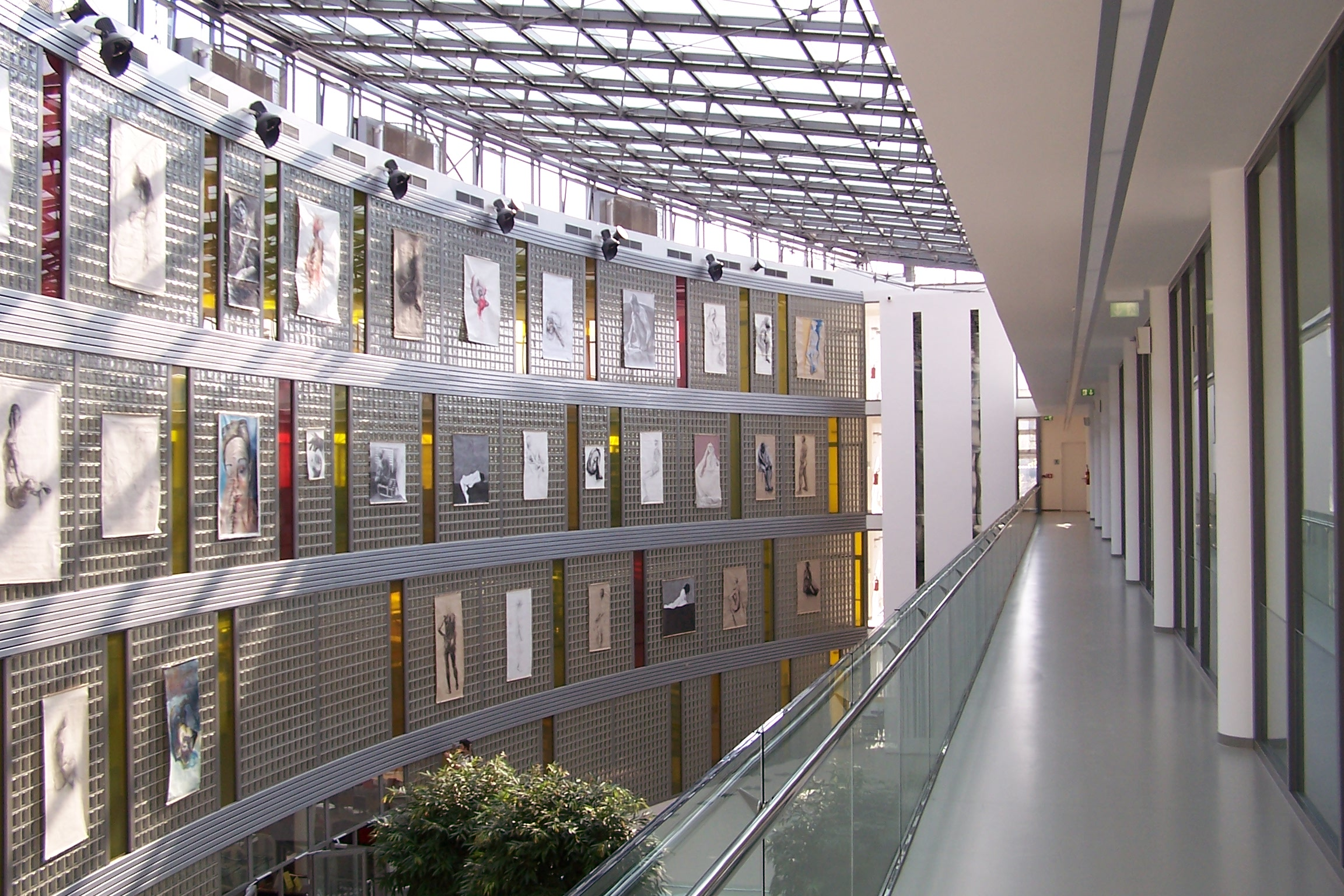
University Centre of the Tomas Bata University, Zlín 2008

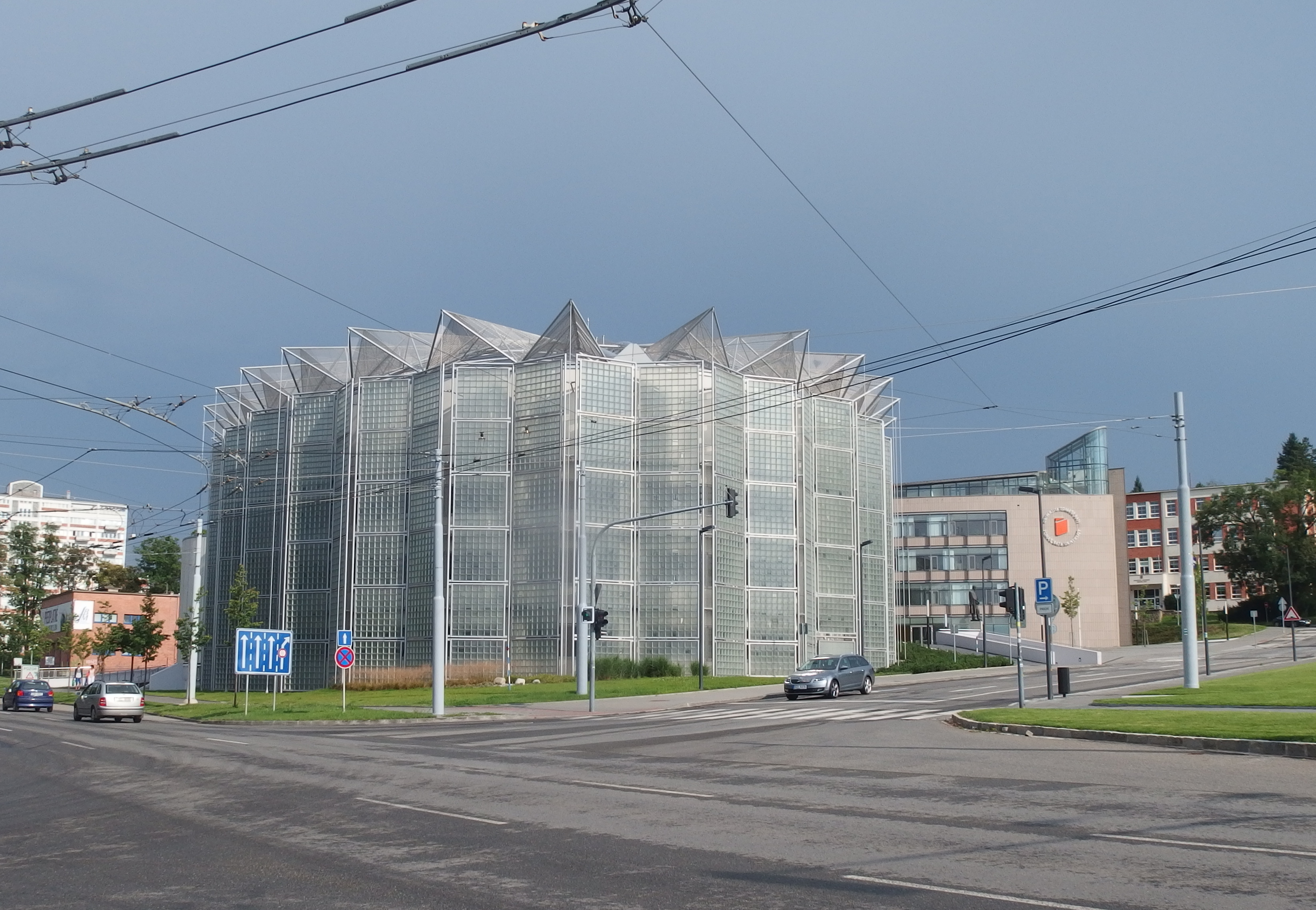
Zlín Congress Centre, Zlín 2011

=== Great Britain ===
- Kenzo design store, London 1982
- Interior design of Lloyd's Headquarters, London 1984
- Boutiques in Harrods department store, London 1985
- Legends nightclub, London 1987
- Renovation of Joseph boutique on Sloane Street, London 1989
- Reception of Design Council, London 1991
- North Woolwich footbridge, London 1991
- Lockmeadow Pedestrian footbridge, Kent 1991
- Royal Victoria Dock, London 1991
- Browns nightclub, London 1991
- Museum of Sir John Soane, London 1993
- Joan & David shop on New Bond Street, London 1994
- De Montfort University Library, Leicester 1996
- Canada Water bus station, London 1999
- Royal Academy of Art shop, London 2001
- Boodles store, Liverpool 2004
- Harrods Fine Jewellery store, London 2006
- Bollinger jewellery gallery of the Victoria & Albert Museum, London 2008
- Boodles Jewellery store, London 2008
- Greenwich Hotel, London 2008
- Staircase in Somerset House, London 2014

=== Czech Republic ===
- Andersen Consulting Offices in Dancing House, Prague 1996
- Karel Schwarzenberg's flat, Prague 1997
- Reconstruction of Komerční banka's main hall, Wenceslaus Square, Prague 1998
- New Orangery at Prague Castle, Prague 1998
- Pedestrian bridge over Koliště Street, Brno 1998
- The British Council, Prague 2003
- Reconstruction of St. Anna Church, Old Town, Prague 2004
- Reconstruction of Hotel Maximilian, Prague 2005
- U Tří Čápů Hotel, Prague 2006
- University Centre of the Tomas Bata University, Zlín 2008
- Spa House Sněžka, Mariánské Lázně 2010
- Zlín Congress Centre, Zlín 2011 – the Congress Centre also serves as the seat of Bohuslav Martinů Philharmony
- Café B. Braun at I. P. Pavlov Square, Prague 2011
- SIKO Showroom, Prague 2013
- Renovation of Hotel Josef, Prague 2015
- Facade of housing project Sky Barrandov, Prague 2016
- Beltissimo shops, Prague 2016
- Faculty of Humanities of the Tomas Bata University, Zlín 2017
- Luděk Sekyra's Family Villa, Prague 2018
- New building of the General Faculty Hospital in Prague, New Town, Prague (still under construction in 2021) – right next to St. Apolinaire Maternity Hospital
- Three residential towers replacing the old Central Telelecommunication Building near Žižkov freight railway station, Prague (project is still in approval process as of 2021)
- Reconstruction of Věžák Tower in Ostčilova Street, Ostrava (construction is set to begin in 2023)

=== Other countries ===
- Remodeling of the Alex Boutique, Florence 1989
- Joan & David store on Fifth Avenue, New York 1990
- Bergdorf Goodman Building fifth floor renovation, New York 1992
- Joan & David design store, Paris 1994
- Hugo Boss design store, Tokyo 1995
- Tiffany Gallery at the New-York Historical Society Museum & Library, New York 2017

== Awards ==
- 1991 Royal Designer for Industry
- 1994 Awarded CBE in the 1994 Birthday Honours.
- 1997 Elected as Academician to The Royal Academy of Arts Member of RA Council
- 2008 Honorary Doctor of Philosophy, University of Nottingham and London Metropolitan University
- 2013 Jane Drew Prize
- 2013 Honorary Doctorate, Royal College of Art
- 2018 Honorary Silver Medal of Jan Masaryk
- 2018 Lifetime Achievement Medal at the London Design Festival
- 2024 Commanders of the Order of the White Lion
- 2025 The VIZE 97 Prize

== Trivia ==
While studying architecture at CTU, one of Jiřičná's classmates was Pavel Bobek who later became a famous Czech singer. Jan Kaplický, another famous Czech architect, was Jiřičná's life partner for 10 years. She is also a vegetarian.

== Gallery ==
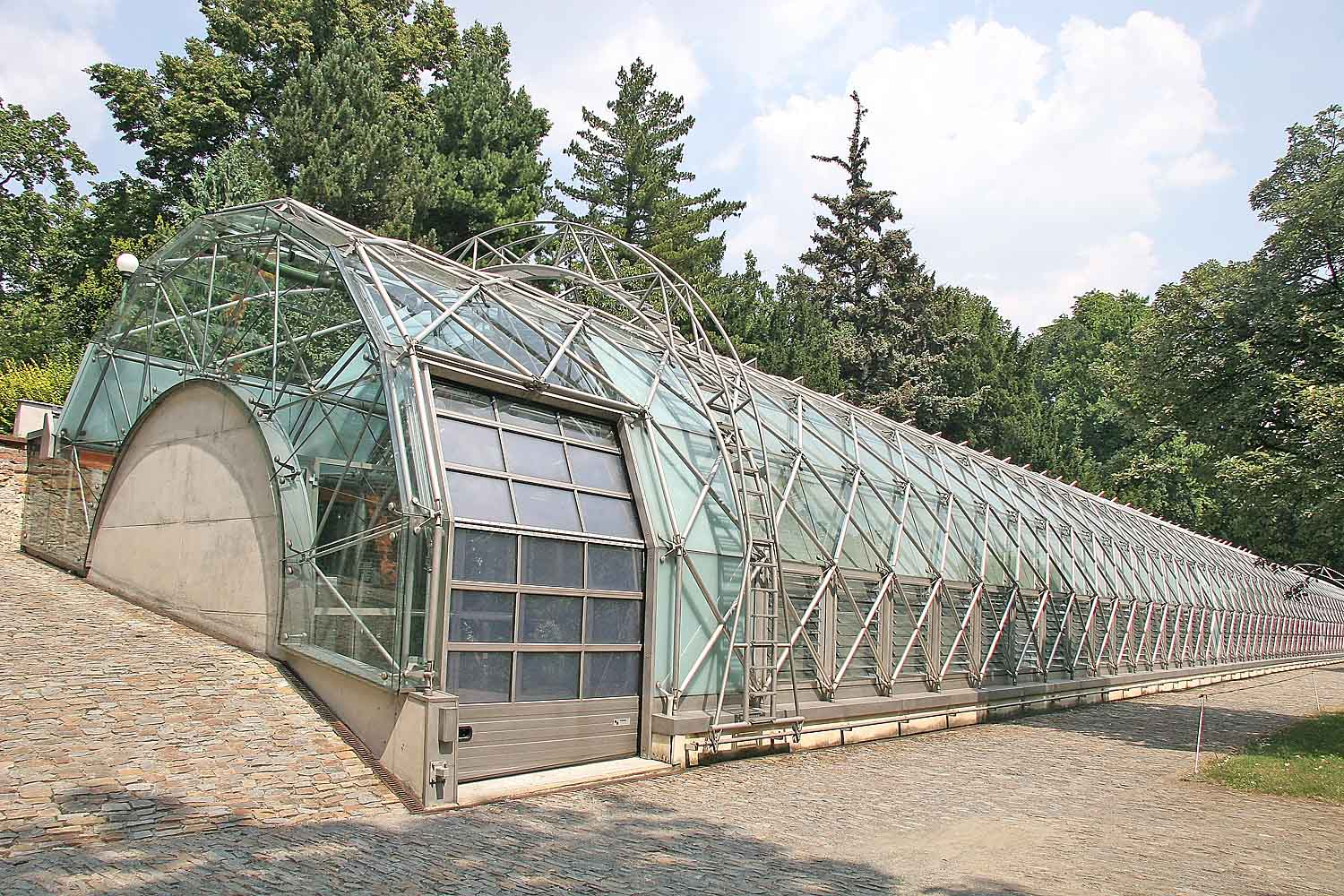
Orangery Royal Garden of Prague Castle, 1999

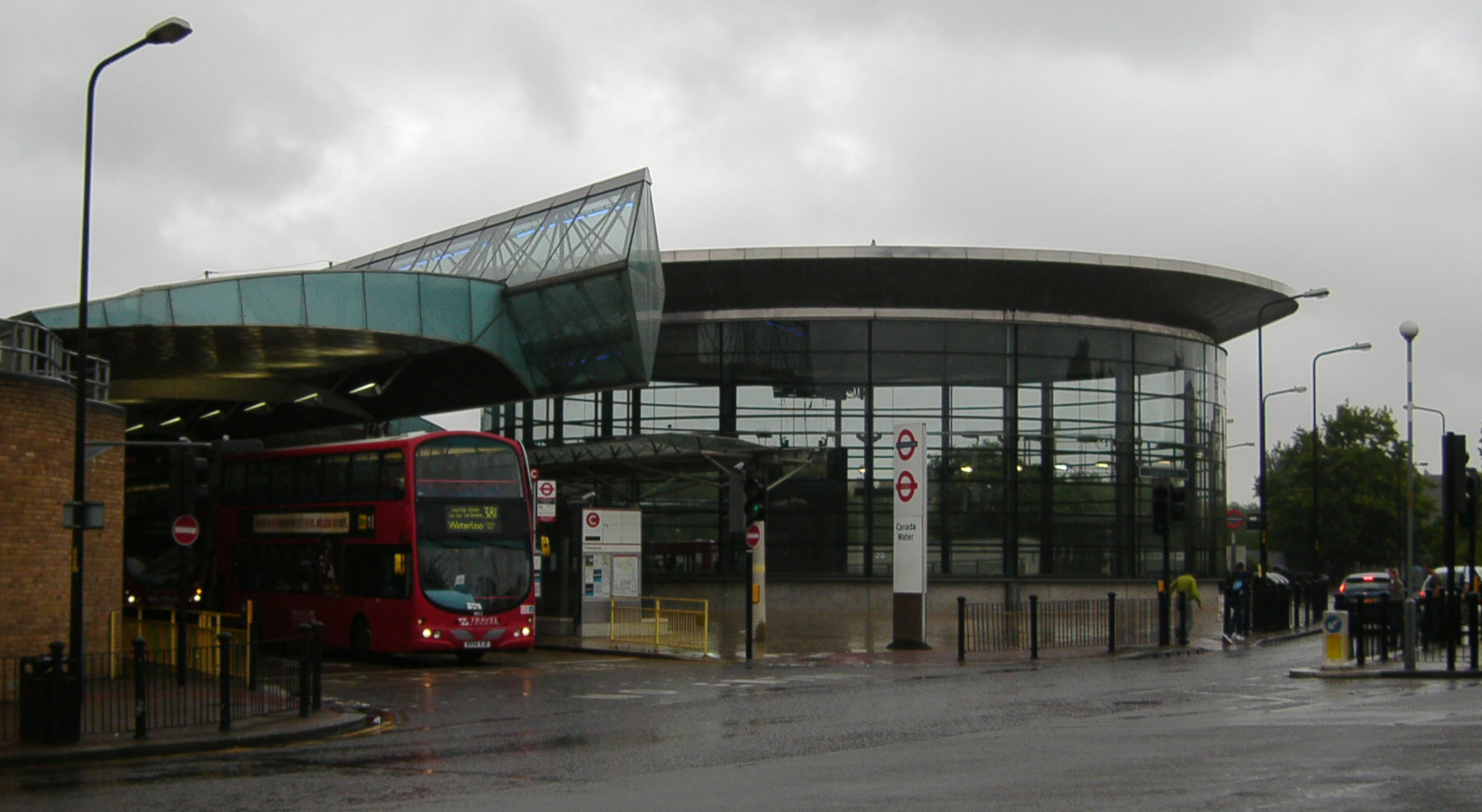
Bus station Canada Water London, 1999

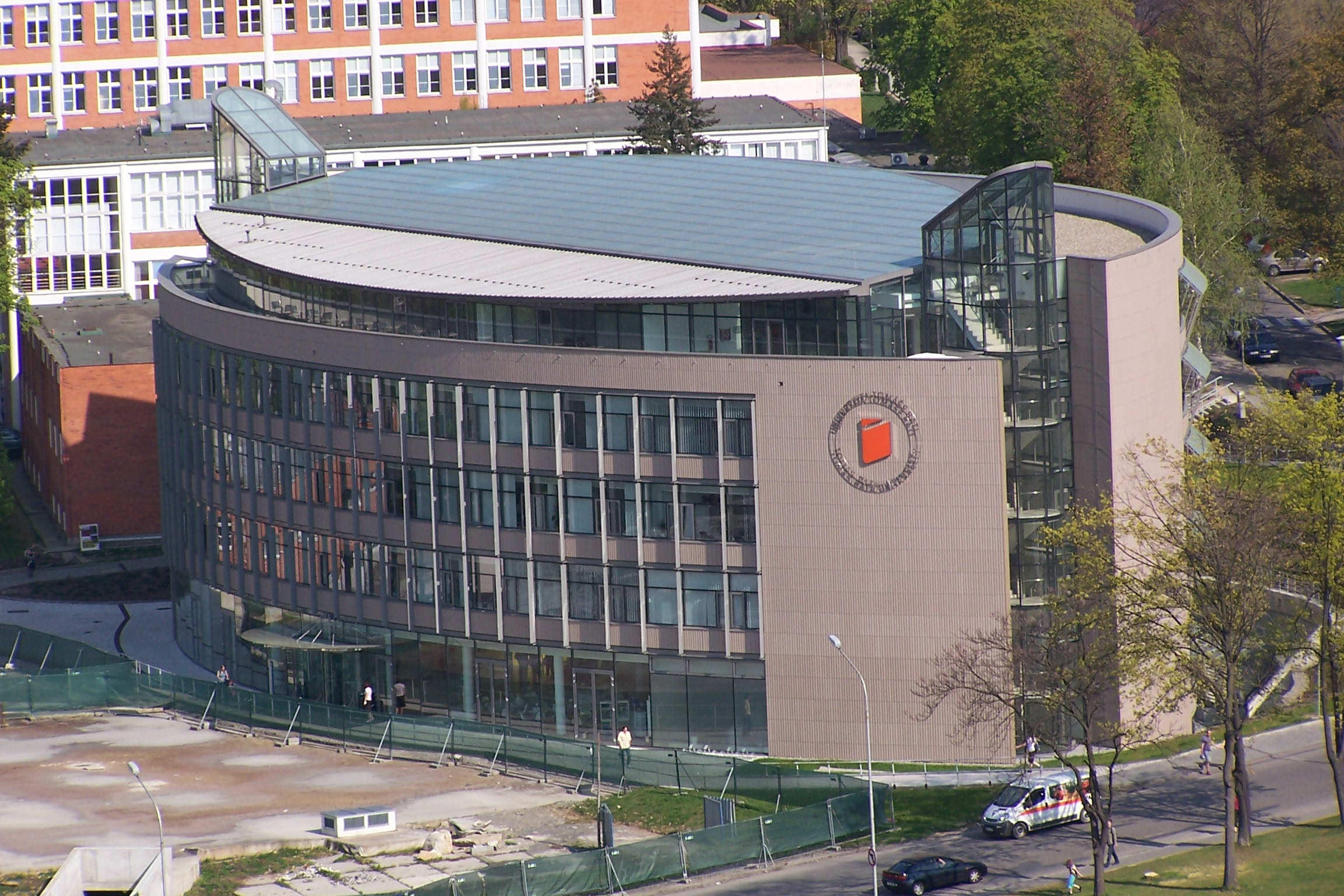
University center Zlín, 2008

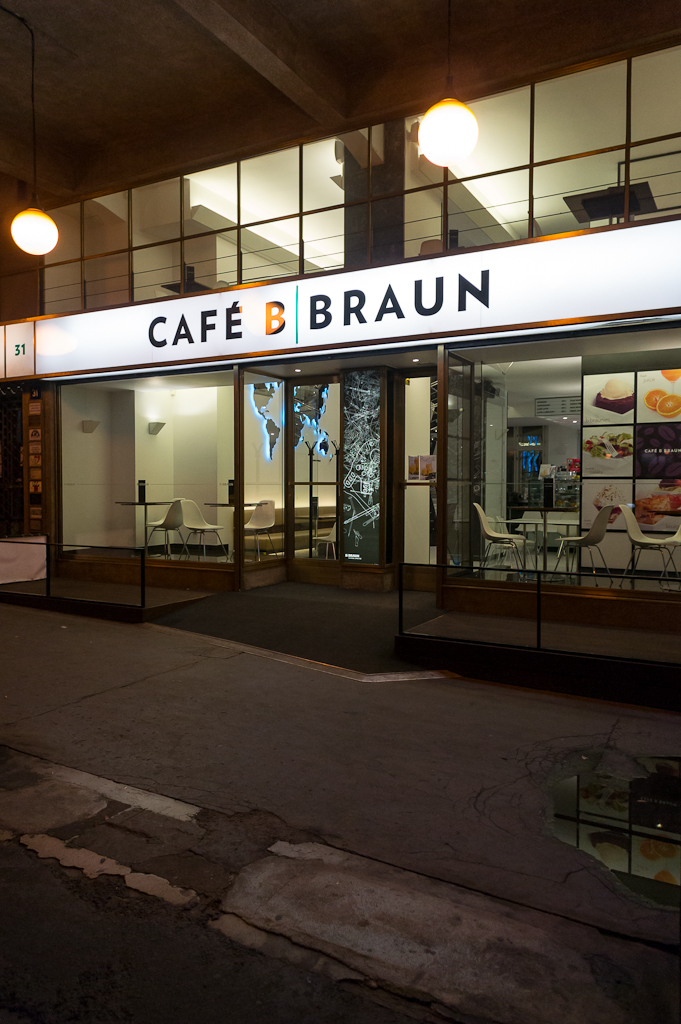
Café B. Braun, in the building "Medical House", Prague 2010

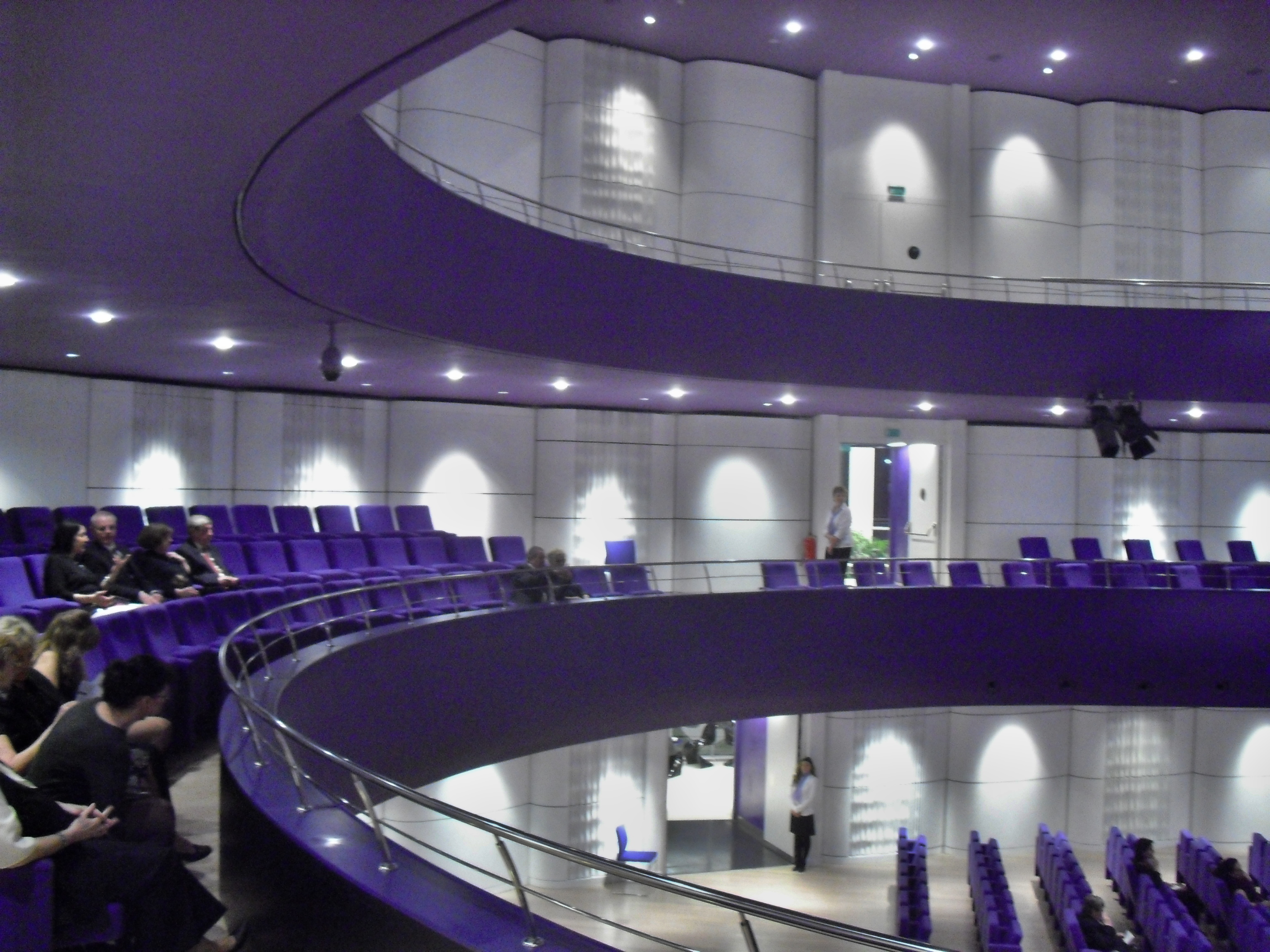
The main hall of the congress center Zlín, 2011
