= Pavlína Wolfová =

Czech journalist

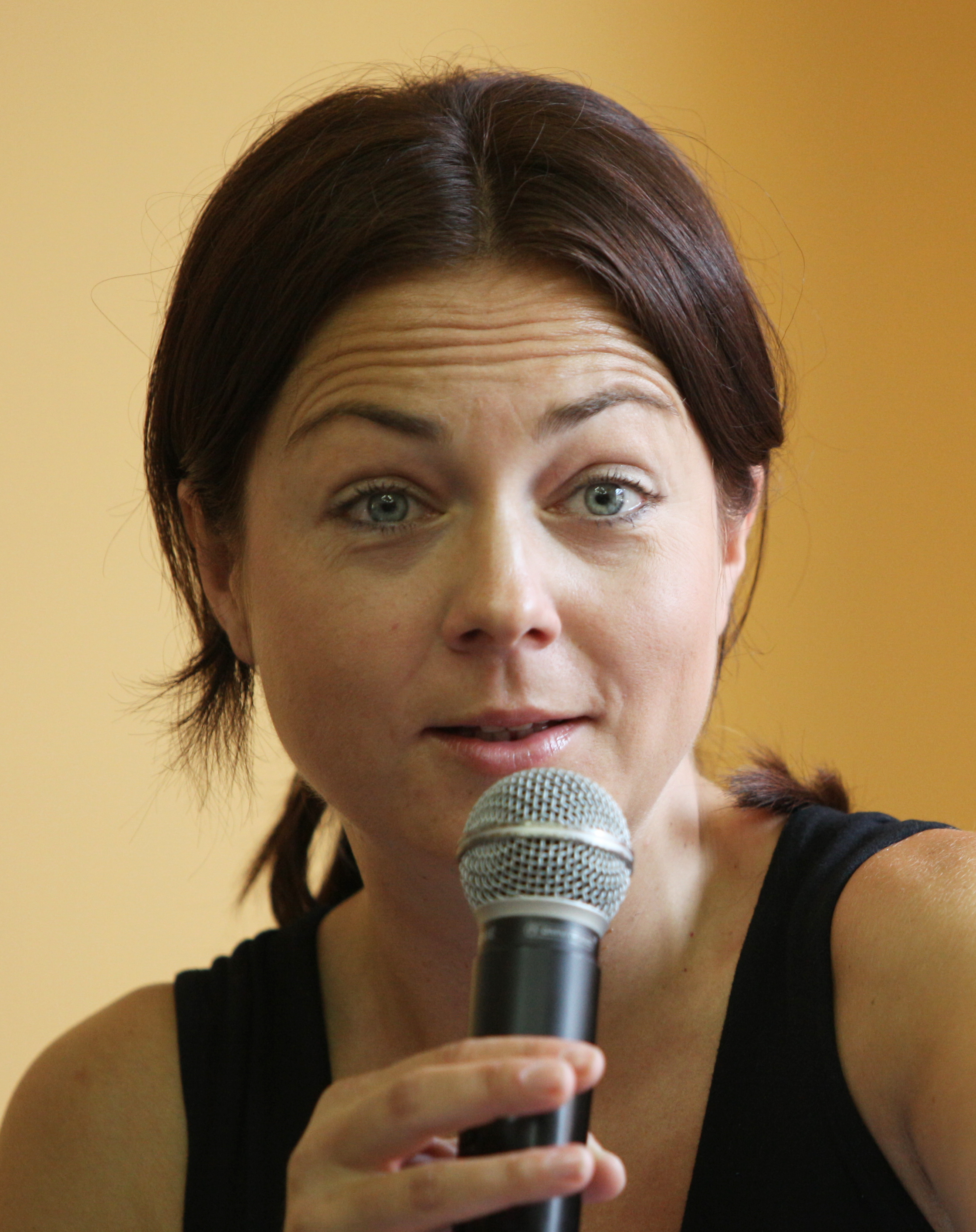
- Wolfová at 44th Karlovy Vary International Film Festival
- Born: 22 December 1971 (age 53); Prague, Czechoslovakia
- Citizenship: Czech Republic
- Occupations: Journalist; television presenter
- Spouse: Jan Bubeník
- Children: 2

Pavlína Wolfová (née Spálená; 22 December 1971) is a Czech journalist and television presenter.

== Life and career ==
Wolfová graduated from the Faculty of Social Sciences, Charles University, from 1991 to 1992, she worked as an intern at Lidové noviny. She worked in Czech Television's domestic and later foreign news. In 1996, she was a reporter for the TV Nova program Na vlastní oči. In 1997, she had her own talk show Áčko on the same network.

Since 2000, she has hosted the Czech Radio programs Nad věčí, BonaDea and Radiofórum on the station CRo 1 – Radiožurnál, on the same station she was a part of the program Děti vám to řeknou. In June 2019, she was part of the team of presenters of the program Pressklub on Frekvence 1 station for a while. Since 2020, she has been the presenter of Pavlína Wolfová's 360° program on CNN Prima News.

== Personal life ==
Wolfová is the daughter of singer Petr Spálený and actress Pavlína Filipovská. She is also the granddaughter of the actor František Filipovský. Her first husband was Slovak journalist Karol Wolf. She was married for the second time to businessman Jan Bubeník. They have two children, Matilda and Matouš.
