= František Ringo Čech =

Czech musician, politician, and writer (born 1943)

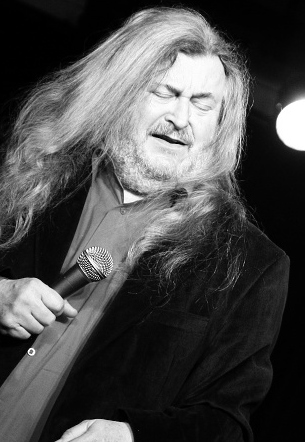
- Čech in 2011

Background information
- Born: František Čech; 9 July 1943 (age 83); Prague, Protectorate of Bohemia and Moravia
- Occupations: Musician; politician; writer
- Instruments: Drums; vocals

František Ringo Čech (born 9 July 1943) is a Czech musician, politician, and writer.

== Life and career ==
=== Early musical career: 1959–1965 ===
František Čech was born in Prague in 1943 to František Čech Pražský, a musician of Viennese origin. From 1959 to 1963, he worked as a radio mechanic and television technician, while playing drums in various Dixieland and brass ensembles, such as Storyville Jazz, which also included Ivan Mládek and Ivo Pešák. In 1963, he cofounded the rock band Olympic together with Jaromír Klempíř, and began writing song lyrics for the first time.

He studied drums at the Prague Conservatory from 1963 to 1965, as well as folklore, piano, and recorder. In December 1965, he travelled to the United States with the Jiří Srnec black light theatre, where his wife, Magda, performed, thus ending his stint with Olympic. It was around this time that he adopted the nickname Ringo, after Beatles drummer Ringo Starr.

=== Return to Czechoslovakia: 1967–1989 ===
After fourteen months abroad, Čech returned home in February 1967. He formed his own beat orchestra, Rogers Band, which also included his brother Svatopluk, who played saxophone. The two left the band a year later and went on to start a new group called Shut Up, which acted as the house band at Semafor theatre until 1972 and included in its roster such musicians as Pavel Bobek, Viktor Sodoma, and Jiří Grossmann. In 1972, the band changed its name to Skupina Františka Ringo Čecha (František Ringo Čech's Band) and became autonomous. A year later, the ill-fated Jiří Schelinger joined the group on vocals. Around this time, Čech switched from playing a standard drum kit to bongos, and began performing spoken word within the band's repertoire. He also wrote lyrics for other artists, including Karel Gott, one of the most popular Czech singers and performers.

Čech also began to write other material apart from his profuse musical output, such as short stories for the children's magazine Pionýr and a column in Mladý svět. In the 1970s, he obtained some of his first acting roles, including in the 1975 film Romance za korunu and the television production Na startu je delfín. His band travelled to a number of European countries such as Russia and Poland, where they opened for Smokie in 1975.

In the early 1980s, Čech organized a number of music festivals and performed with the band Metronom. He also continued to write and began to try his hand at artistic painting. In 1983, he formed Čechovo prozatímní divadlo (Čech's Provisional Theatre), in which he held the roles of author, artistic director, director, and actor. He also appeared in several more films, such as How the World Is Losing Poets, and wrote song lyrics for such productions as Což takhle dát si špenát and Hop – a je tu lidoop.

=== After the Velvet Revolution: 1989–present ===
After the Velvet Revolution, Čech became involved in politics. In 1991, he ran as an independent candidate for the Club of Committed Non-Party Members, and later joined the Czech Social Democratic Party (ČSSD, now Social Democracy). In the 1994 Czech municipal elections, he became a member of the Prague City Council for the ČSSD. In the 1996 Czech legislative election, he was elected to the Chamber of Deputies for the ČSSD, retaining the seat until 1998. In the 1998 Czech Senate election, he unsuccessfully ran for the ČSSD in the Jičín region, losing to Jiří Liška.

Čech has long supported the anti-European and anti-immigration policies of Miloš Zeman and his allies. In the 2017 Czech legislative election, he was the national leader of the Party of Civic Rights. On 28 October 2015, President Miloš Zeman awarded him the Medal of Merit.

== Partial discography ==
- Shut Up (1972)
- Báječní muži (1975)
- Ovoce z naší zahrádky (1975)
- Nemám hlas jako zvon (1975)
- Schelinger a Rezek se skupinou F. R. Čecha (1976)
- Hrrrr na ně (1977)
- Nám se líbí... (1979)
- 1983 (1983)
- Dívčí Válka (Historická Hra O Osmi Obrazech) (1999)
- Pra Pra Pra... (2004)
- Já Jsem Básník, Mistr Péra (2008)

== Selected publications ==
- Půl a půl je celá (Albatros 1978, il. Gabriel Filcík)
- Tvarové hry (Albatros 1980, il. Gabriel Filcík)
- Z mého života (1981, il. Vladimír Jiránek)
- Čechovo prozatímní divadlo. Bulletin. Saison 1988/89 (1988)
- Ruský týden (Studio dobré nálady-Kredit 1990, il. Ota Jirák)
- Dívčí válka (Severočeské nakladatelství 1990, il. Jiří Winter-Neprakta)
- Ringo v Annonci (Carmen 1991)
- Můj boj (Kredit 1993)
- Ringo (Venkov 1993)
- Jiří Schelinger: Život a... (Orba 1994)
- Naivní svět Františka Ringo Čecha (Všeobecná zdravotní pojišťovna České republiky 1994, calendar)
- Češi a jejich samičky 1 (Arkanum 1995)
- Češky a jejich samci 2 (Jaroslav Ředina 1996)
- Proč ta sova tolik houkala. Hú Is Hú is hú is hú is hú (Eminent 1998, ISBN 80-85876-72-8)
- Dívčí válka (Eminent 1999, ISBN 80-85876-82-5)
- Pra pra pra... (Pilsen Press 1999, ISBN 80-238-6756-3)
- Cucurucuců (Ikar 2003, ISBN 80-249-0292-3)
- Praha 2006/Prague-Prag-Praga 2006 (Presco Group 2005, calendar)
- Obrazy. Výstavní katalog (Divadlo Hybernia 2007)
- Generace Beatles aneb Rok stárnoucího rockera (Euromedia Group - Ikar 2012, ISBN 978-80-249-1975-1)
- Generace Beatles aneb Cestou do krematoria (Euromedia Group - Ikar 2015, ISBN 978-80-249-2910-1)
- Z deníku osamělého běžce 1 / 2012 (Galén 2016)

Co-author and contributor

- Čtyři hrají rock (Panton 1986, with Jaromír Tůma, uncredited)
- Verše pod osnovou (Panton 1986, song texts)
- Karel Gott'78 (Supraphon 1978, song texts)
- Příběhy z divokého východu (Riosport-press 1991, with Ivan Mládek, foreword only)
- Hádej, kam půjdem na flám (Kredit 1992)
- Kde, kdy a jak knihu nejraději čtu (AZ servis 1993)
- 99 písní Olympicu (BESTIA a MUZIKUS 1994)
- Snídaně s Novou (Forma 1995)
- Jedeme do Anglie (Forma 1996)
- Jiří Schelinger, Jiří Šlitr, Jiří Hrzán (Formát 1998)
- Herci malují (Knižní klub 1999)
- Amfora. Gigant na góly a fóry (Jota 1998, with Jaromír Tůma and Petr Salava, uncredited)
- Ondřej Suchý: Aluminiový klíček Felixe Holzmanna (MODRÝ STŮL 2006)
- Jako Čuk a Gek (Ikar 2008, with Petr Novotný, ISBN 978-80-249-1081-9)

== See also ==
- List of Czech painters
