= Pavlína Filipovská =

Czech actress and singer (born 1941)

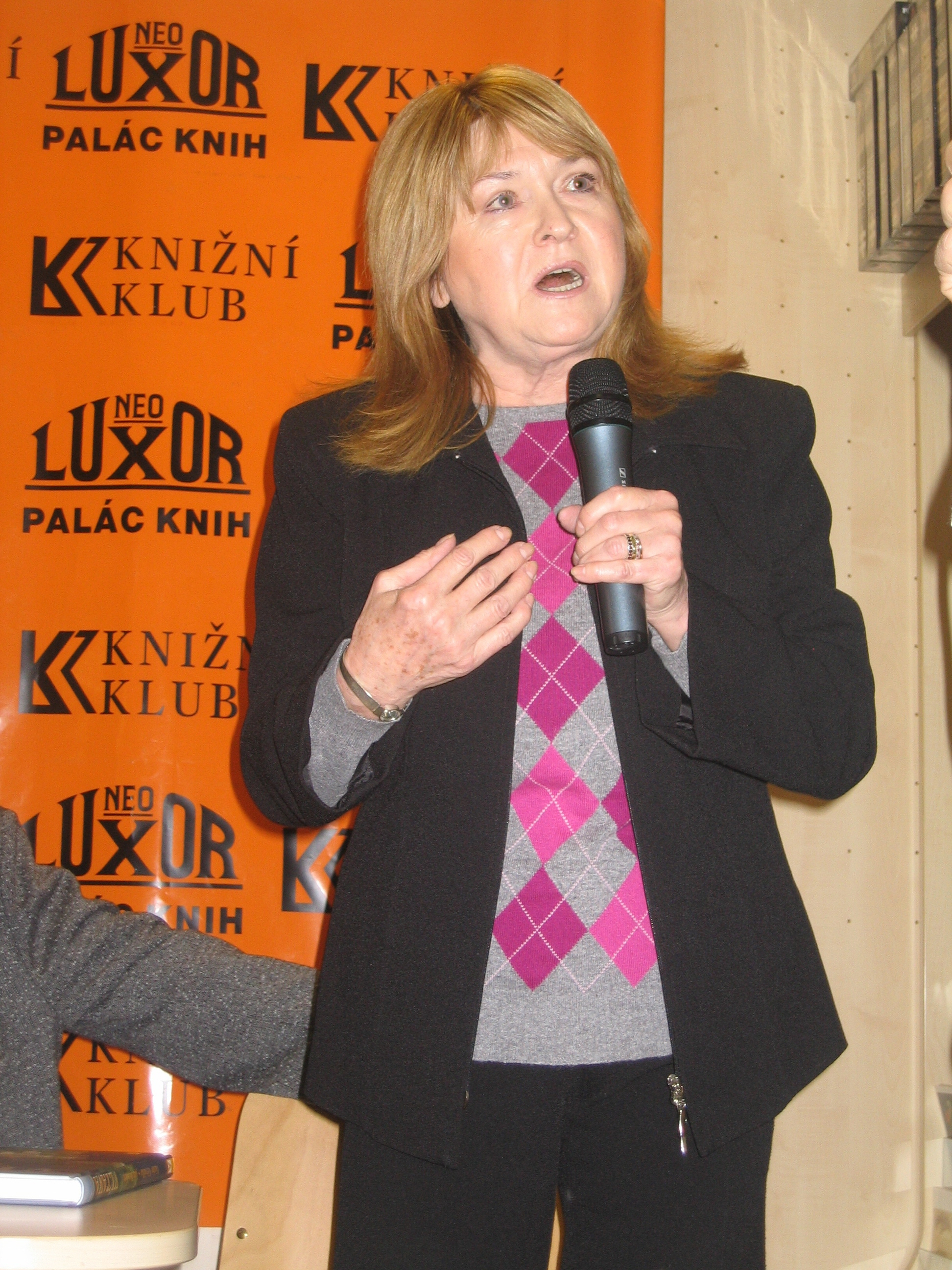
- Filipovská in 2007
- Born: 28 May 1941 (age 85); Prague, Protectorate of Bohemia and Moravia
- Citizenship: Czech Republic
- Occupations: Actress; singer
- Spouse: Petr Spálený (m. 1974; div. 1979)
- Children: Pavlína Wolfová

Pavlína Filipovská (born 28 May 1941) is a Czech actress and singer. She reached her greatest popularity in the 1960s.

== Early life ==
Filipovská was born in Prague on 28 May 1941, the daughter of actor František Filipovský.

== Acting career ==
In 1958, Filipovská began working as a television presenter of children's programs. She learned acting and singing. In 1959 she was engaged in the Prague cabaret Semafor, where she took part in most performances as an actress and singer until the early 1960s. She also became known with her songs in many radio and television competitions, sometimes in a duo with the singer Josef Zíma. In 1964 she moved to the Apollo Theater and from 1969 to 1974 she performed at the Rokoko Theater. Later, she was involved in the drama and theater group Divadelní společnost Josefa Dvořáka of former Semafor employee Josef Dvořák.

In the Semafor, Filipovská took part in the following performances:

- Člověk z půdy
- Papírové blues
- Vo co de
- Sběratel stínů
- Taková ztráta krve
- Zuzana není pro nikoho doma
- Sekta
- Šest žen

== Music career ==
In Filipovská's first stage play in Semafor she sang, among other things, the song Včera neděle byla (Yesterday was Sunday), which was released as a single in 1960 and became the best-selling record of the Supraphon label for many years (only in the first year after its release, almost a quarter sold a million units, which was an enormous number for small Czechoslovakia). Her other achievements during her time at the Semafor included Barvy – Laky, Betty, Pozvání, Proč se lidi nemaj rádi, Kapitáne, kam s tou lodí, Purpura, and Zpěv ptačí. In her repertoire, there are several dozen pop songs that became notable hits, especially in the 1960s.

== Personal life ==
Filipovská was married to Petr Spálený from 1974 to 1979. One of their daughters is journalist Pavlína Wolfová.

== Filmography ==
The most important appearances by Filipovská in films and television productions are:

- 1961: Procesí k Panence
- 1963: Konkurs
- 1964: Kdyby tisíc klarinetů
- 1967: Sedm žen Alfonse Karáska
- 1967: Ta naše písnička česká
- 1969: Dospěláci můžou všechno)
