= Tomas Bata University in Zlín =

Public university in the Czech Republic

- Univerzita Tomáše Bati ve Zlíně
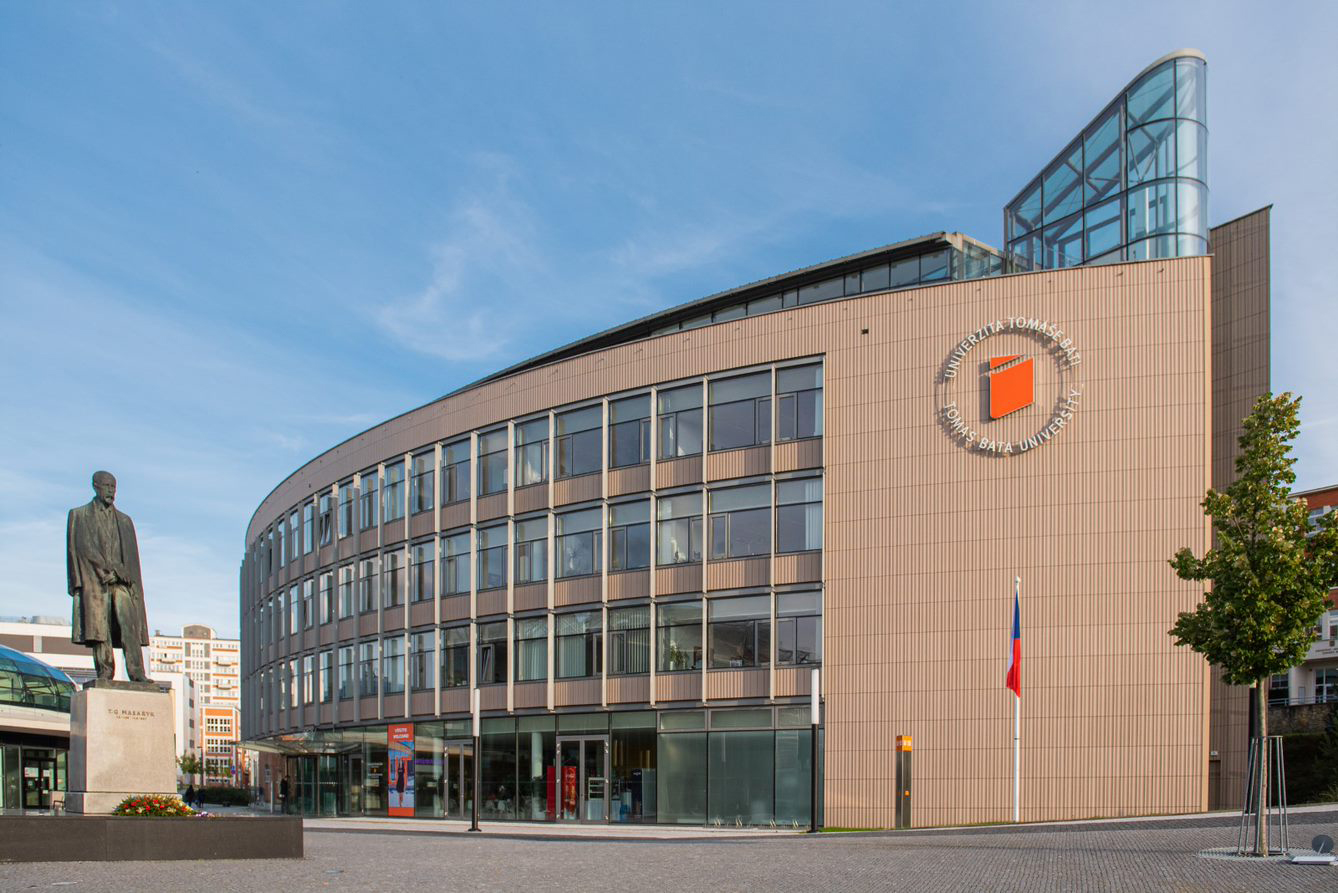
- Motto: Erudire et Creare (Educate and Create)
- Type: Public
- Established: 2001-01-01
- Affiliations: EUA
- Rector: Professor Milan Adámek
- Students: 9,200
- Location: Zlín, Czech Republic; 49°13′21.56″N 17°39′53.48″E
- Website: www.utb.cz
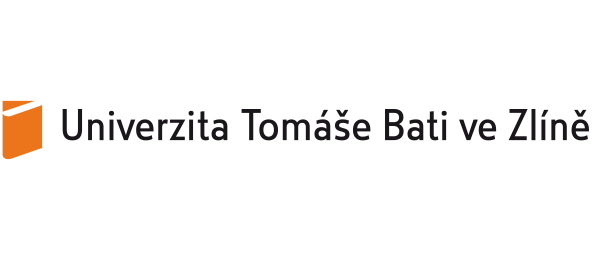

University rankings

Regional – Overall
- QS Emerging Europe and Central Asia: 87 (2022)

Tomas Bata University in Zlín (TBU), (Czech Univerzita Tomáše Bati ve Zlíně), is a Czech public university in the Moravian city of Zlín, comprising six faculties offering courses in technology, economics, humanities, arts and health care. The university was named after the entrepreneur Tomáš Baťa, the founder of the shoe industry in Zlín. With a current student population of more than 9,200, TBU is among the medium-sized Czech universities.

== History ==
TBU in Zlín came from the 40-year tradition of the Faculty of Technology, which was established in Zlín in 1969. This faculty was founded in 1960 as a vocational college for the Svit factory, and it was a part of the Technical University in Bratislava. In 1963 it became a part of the Technical University in Brno. This faculty had been educating specialists in leather, plastics and rubber technology for a long time. Later another vocational college in the town was established - the Design department, which is still a part of the Academy of Arts, Architecture and Design in Prague.

A proposal for the establishment of Tomas Bata University in Zlín was developed in the 1990s. As at that time, both the Faculty of Management and Economics and Institute of Advertising and Marketing Communications (later the Faculty of Multimedia Communications) were founded. However, on November 14, 2000, the then Czech President Václav Havel signed the Act on the Establishment of Tomas Bata University in Zlín and the university was founded as of January 1, 2001. The town of Zlín eventually became known for providing higher education and research in a number of specialized fields.

The Faculty of Multimedia Communications was established in January 2002 and on 1 January 2006 the Faculty of Applied Informatics was founded. This was followed a year later by the establishment of the Faculty of Humanities. On 1 September 2009, the newest faculty, the Faculty of Logistics and Crisis Management, was launched. Currently, there are 9,700 students pursuing different degree programmes at the university. Prof. Petr Sáha is the current Rector of TBU. He was also the first Rector when Tomas Bata University in Zlín was established in 2001.

== Organisation ==
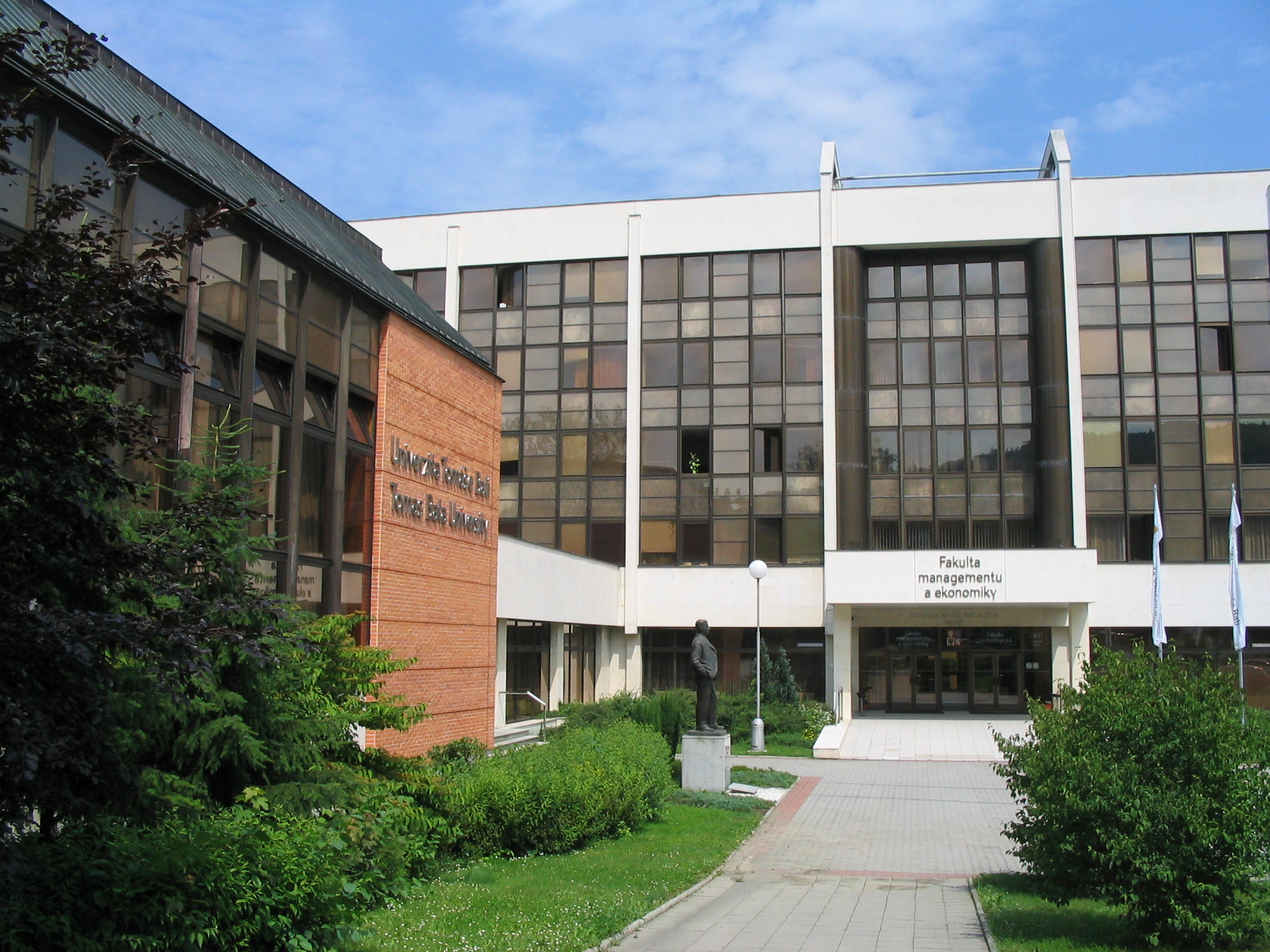
Faculty of Management and Economics of TBU in Zlín

As of 2019, Tomas Bata University in Zlín is made up of six faculties that provide 190 accredited degree courses within 111 accredited degree programmes. The programmes are taught in either Czech language or English language at the Bachelor's, Master's and PhD levels. Tuition is offered in all the faculties in both full-time and part-time form. The faculties are:

- Faculty of Technology
- Faculty of Management and Economics
- Faculty of Multimedia Communications
- Faculty of Applied Informatics
- Faculty of Humanities
- Faculty of Logistics and Crisis Management

=== University Centre ===
The construction of the University Centre began in June 2008. The unique building was designed by Prof. Eva Jiřičná. Today, the building has been completed and it houses the modern TBU Library that offers more than 500 study places. The building is also the new seat of the rectorate of the university.

== Links with international bodies ==
As part of the internationalization strategy of TBU in Zlín, there is considerable emphasis on the teaching of English as well as other foreign languages. Hence, the number of degree programmes that are taught in English has been continually extended. Also, TBU provides maximum support for all forms of international cooperation, thus, lectures and teaching internships, joint research projects, student exchanges among others. The unified credit system (European Credit Transfer System, ECTS), used by many European universities is used for all TBU degree programmes. Hence, graduates are issued with the Diploma Supplement.

Tomas Bata University in Zlín is a member of several international organizations, including its membership of the European University Association. The EUA is made up of over 800 universities from 46 countries in Europe. Membership of the EUA enables TBU to participate in all the significant activities of EUA with the aim of supporting higher education in Europe as well as to present and increase the visibility of TBU to the European academic community.

TBU is a signatory to the Magna Charta Universitatum of Bologna. The signatories of the Charta commit to undertake or create conditions for student mobility and teacher. Furthermore, TBU is a member of the Danube Rectors' Conference, which is an association of universities in the Danube region and other institutions. TBU provides education opportunities for students from all over the world.

== Honorary doctorates conferred ==
The honorary degree of 'doctor honoris causa' was conferred by TBU upon two prominent personalities. José Manuel Barroso, President of the European Commission, was awarded an honorary doctorate on 22 April 2009. Eva Jiřičná, a Czech architect and a native of Zlín, received an honorary doctorate on 18 May 2011. On 26 April 2012, Sonja Bata became the next holder of the TBU honorary degree awarded to her in recognition of her long-term support of TBU.

== Scientists ==
Top scientists in their field are members of the TBU teaching staff. Some of them are Prof. Milan Zelený, a world-famous economist, Prof. Karel Kolomazník, a laureate of the Rolex Award for Enterprise, which is called "a mini Nobel Prize".

Prof. Petr Sáha, a former President of the Polymer Processing Society.

Assoc. Prof. Petr Hlaváček, prominent international expert in footwear hygiene, conducted a research into the 5000-year-old Alpine Mummy (Ötzi) and was nominated for TOP 100 discoveries of the year 2003. Petr Hlaváček also conducted the Terracotta Warriors' Footwear research (2006–2009) as part of the UNESCO's World Heritage.

Prof. Berenika Hausnerová, a UNESCO-L'ORÉAL Award for Women in Science laureate in recognition of her work on the influence of pressure on the rheological behavior of PIM materials.

Prof. Martin Zatloukal, an Exxon Mobil Chemical European Science and Engineering Award laureate. The prize is intended for scientists specializing in polymer processing.

Assoc. Prof. Vladimír Pavlínek, a Morand Lambla Award laureate for his long-running research into conductive polymers and the ways of using them in intelligent applications, made by the international Polymer Processing Society.

== Notable staff and graduates of TBU ==
Marcela Kubalčíková, Michal Smola, Daniel Málek, Klára Křížová Tereza Marusincova
