= Olympic (band) =

Czech rock band

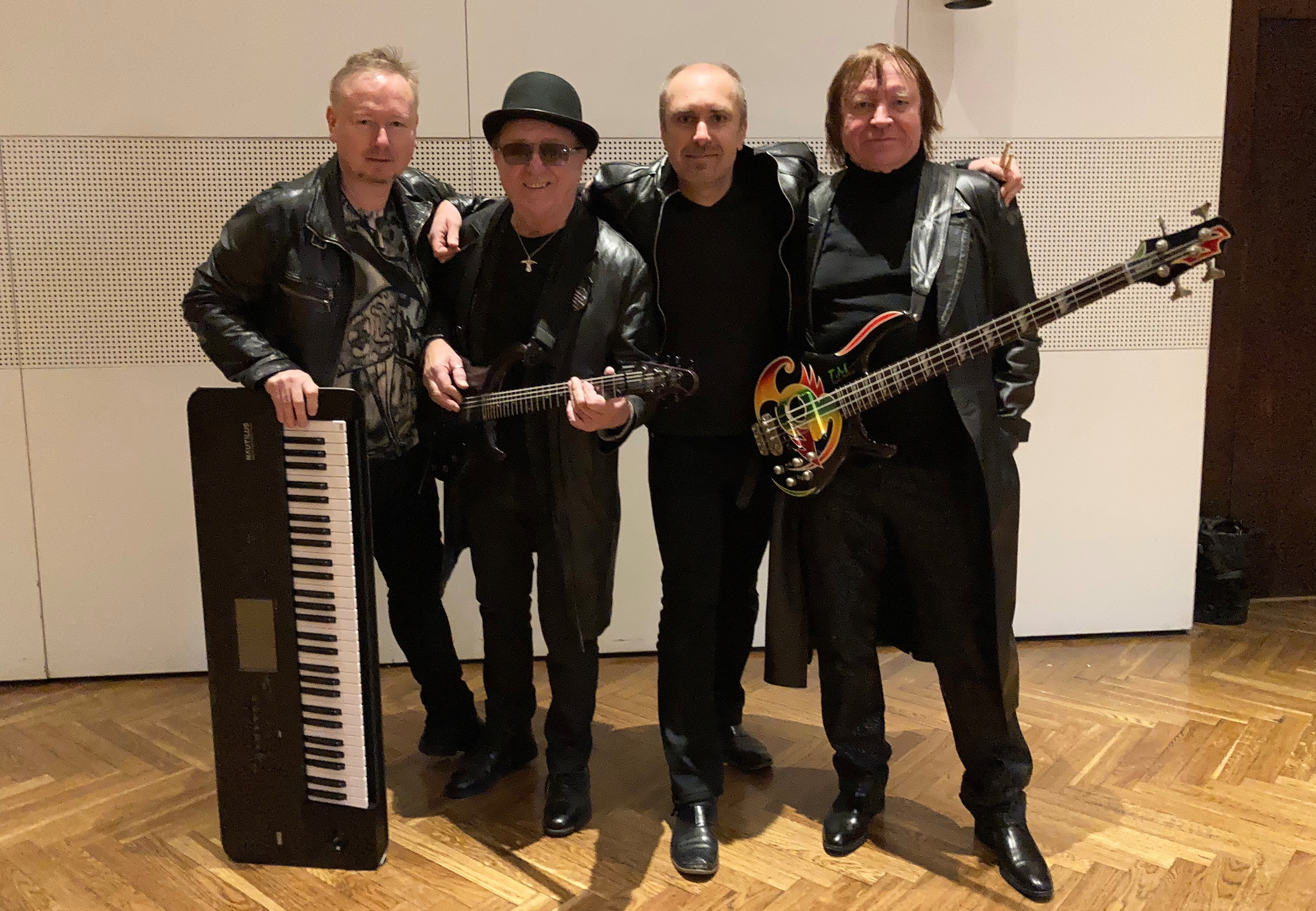
- Olympic in 2021

Background information
- Also known as: Karkulka
- Origin: Prague, Czechoslovakia
- Genres: Hard rock; pop rock; rock and roll; heavy metal
- Years active: 1962–1993; 1994–present
- Labels: Supraphon; Best I.A.
- Members: Petr Janda; Milan Broum; Martin Vajgl; Pavel Březina
- Past members: Miloslav Růžek; Petr Kaplan; Jaromír Klempíř; Pavel Sedláček; Josef Smeták; Pavel Bobek; Miki Volek; František Ringo Čech; Pavel Chrastina; Miroslav Berka; Yvonne Přenosilová; Josef Laufer; Jiří Laurent; Jan Antonín Pacák; Ladislav Klein; Jan Hauser; Jiří Korn; Petr Hejduk; Ladislav Chvalkovský; Pavel Petráš; Milan Peroutka; Jiří Valenta
- Website: skupina-olympic.cz

Olympic is a Czech rock band founded in 1962 in Prague. It is led by Petr Janda, who has been with the group since 1963. Over its history, Olympic has included notable musicians such as František Ringo Čech, Jiří Korn, Pavel Bobek, and Yvonne Přenosilová. The group celebrated 50 years in 2012. As of 2025, they have released 24 studio albums, 5 English-language albums, and numerous live recordings and compilations.

== History ==
The band was founded in 1962 by saxophonist Miloslav Růžek and named Karkulka (after Karlínský Kulturní Kabaret – "Karlín Cultural Cabaret"). It initially consisted of Petr Kaplan (rhythm guitar, vocals), Jaromír Klempíř (keyboards, Ionika), Pavel Sedláček (vocals), Josef Smeták (double bass), Pavel Bobek (vocals), Miki Volek (vocals), František Ringo Čech (drums, vocals), Pavel Chrastina (bass, vocals), and Miroslav Berka (keyboards, vocals). A year later, they adopted the name Olympic, after the club where they performed.

During their early years, they mainly played a style of music popular in Eastern Bloc countries called big beat, which consisted of rock and roll, jazz, and twist. They released their debut studio album, titled Želva, in 1968, which has been called one of the breakthrough records of Czech big beat. They persisted in this vein until the end of the 1970s, issuing the albums Pták Rosomák (1969), Jedeme jedeme (1971), Olympic 4 (1973), and Marathon (1978).

In 1980, Olympic published the first of a trilogy of concept albums, titled Prázdniny na Zemi, which was followed by Ulice in 1981 and Laboratoř in 1984. The band released four more albums, namely Kanagom (1985), Bigbít (1986), Když ti svítí zelená (1988), and Ó jé (1990), before breaking up in 1993. They reformed the following year, however, and continued putting out a steady stream of releases.

In 2012, Olympic celebrated their 50th anniversary with a series of indoor concerts and the release of a set of hits compilations. In May 2013, the band's longtime drummer Milan Peroutka died suddenly after a concert in Karlovy Vary; he was replaced by Martin Vajgl.

In March 2020, keyboardist Jiří Valenta left for health reasons. The audition to fill his vacant position, which received over 50 applications, culminated in a live show, where four finalists performed; the winner was Pavel Březina.

== Lineup changes ==
Vocals

Olympic lost all three of its founding vocalists, namely Pavel Sedláček, Pavel Bobek, and Miki Volek, in 1965–1966. During their early years, their lineup had also included Yvonne Přenosilová and Josef Laufer on vocal duties, but both of them were gone by 1965. Petr Janda subsequently remained the band's sole lead singer.

Bass

In 1969, Olympic's original bassist, Pavel Chrastina, departed and was replaced first by Jan Hauser, then Jiří Korn, Ladislav Chvalkovský, Pavel Petráš, and finally, Milan Broum.

Drums

Jan Antonín Pacák had taken the place of Čech on drums in 1966 and was in turn replaced by Petr Hejduk, who died in 1985. Milan Peroutka took over drum duties and died in 2013. The band then took on current drummer, Martin Vajgl.

Rhythm guitar

Olympic's original rhythm guitarist, Petr Kaplan, left in 1963 and was replaced by Jiří Laurent for two years and then by Ladislav Klein. After his departure in 1972, the band continued without a rhythm guitarist.

== Band members ==
Current

- Petr Janda – guitar, lead vocals (1963–present)
- Milan Broum – bass, backing vocals (1975–present)
- Martin Vajgl – drums, backing vocals (2013–present)
- Pavel Březina – keyboards, backing vocals (2020–present)

Founding members

- Miloslav Růžek – saxophone (1962–1965)
- Petr Kaplan – rhythm guitar, vocals (1962–1963); died 2007
- Jaromír Klempíř – keyboards, Ionika (1962–1964); died 2016
- Pavel Sedláček – vocals (1962–1965)
- Josef Smeták – double bass (1962–1965)
- Pavel Bobek – vocals (1962–1965); died 2013
- Miki Volek – vocals (1962–1966); died 1996
- František Ringo Čech – drums, vocals (1962–1966)
- Pavel Chrastina – bass, vocals (1962–1969); died 2021
- Miroslav Berka – keyboards, vocals (1962–1987); died 1987

Other members

- Yvonne Přenosilová – vocals (1963–1964)
- Josef Laufer – vocals (1963–1965)
- Jiří Laurent – rhythm guitar, vocals (1963–1965); died 2016
- Jan Antonín Pacák – drums, vocals (1965–1971); died 2007
- Ladislav Klein – rhythm guitar, vocals (1965–1972)
- Jan Hauser – bass, vocals (1969–1971)
- Jiří Korn – bass, vocals (1971–1973)
- Petr Hejduk – drums, vocals (1971–1985); died 1995
- Ladislav Chvalkovský – bass, vocals (1973)
- Pavel Petráš – bass, vocals (1974–1975)
- Milan Peroutka – drums, vocals (1986–2013); died 2013
- Jiří Valenta – keyboards, vocals, harmonica (1986–2020); died 2026

Timeline

== Discography ==
Studio albums

- Želva (1968)
- Pták Rosomák (1969)
- Jedeme jedeme (1971)
- Olympic 4 (1973)
- Marathon (1978)
- Prázdniny na Zemi (1980)
- Ulice (1981)
- Laboratoř (1984)
- Kanagom (1985)
- Bigbít (1986)
- Když ti svítí zelená (1988)
- Ó jé (1990)
- Dávno (1994)
- Brejle (1997)
- Karavana (1999)
- Dám si tě klonovat (2003)
- Sopka (2007)
- Back to Love (Previously unreleased album, recorded in France in 1969) (2011)
- Souhvězdí šílenců (2013)
- Souhvězdí drsňáků (2014)
- Souhvězdí romantiků (2015)
- Trilobit (2018)
- Kaťata (2020)
- Bombarďák (2025)

English-language albums

- Overhead (1978)
- Holidays on Earth (1980)
- The Street (1982)
- Laboratory (1984)
- Hidden in Your Mind (1986)

Live albums

- Rock'N'Roll (1981)
- Olympic v Lucerně (1983)
- Live – Jak se lítá vzhůru (1993)
- Unplugged (1995)
- Ondráš podotýká (1997)
- Trilogy Tour Live (2006)
- Retro 1 Želva (2011)
- Retro 2 Pták Rosomák (2011)
- Retro 3 Jedeme jedeme (2011)
- Retro 4 Olympic 4 (2011)
- Retro 5 Marathón (2011)
- Retro 6 Trilogy (2012)
- Retro 7 Kanagom, Bigbít (2012)
- Retro 8 Když ti svítí zelená, Ó jé (2012)
- Retro 9 Dávno, Brejle (2012)
- Retro 10 Karavana, Dám si tě klonovat, Sopka (2012)

Compilations

- Handful (1972)
- 12 nej (1976)
- Akorát (1983)
- 25 let (1987)
- Jako za mlada (1992)
- The Best Of (2CD) (1993)
- Balady (1994)
- Singly I (1995)
- Vlak co nikde nestaví (1995)
- Petr Hejduk (1995)
- Singly II (1996)
- Singly III (1997)
- Singly IV (1997)
- Singly V (1998)
- Singly VI (1998)
- Singly VII (1999)
- ...to nejlepší z Olympicu 1 (2001)
- ...to nejlepší z Olympicu 2 (2001)
- Stejskání (2004)
- Trilogy (3CD: Prázdniny na Zemi, Ulice, Laboratoř) (2006)
- The Best Of – 43 jasných hitových zpráv (2CD) (2006)
- Rarity (2010)
- 66 nej + 1 (2017)
- 60 (2022)

Box sets

- Olympic komplet (14 CD) (2010)
- Olympic 50 – Hity, Singly, Rarity (5 CD) (2012)
- Trilogie souhvězdí (3 LP) (2017)

Video albums

- Lucerna Live – VHS (1992)
- Unplugged – VHS (1995)
- Prázdniny na Zemi/20 let Olympiku – VHS (1997)
- Ulice/Čtvrtstoletí Olympiku – VHS (1997)
- Olympic slaví 40 let – DVD (2002)
- Olympic 1963/1973 I. díl – DVD (2003)
- Olympic 1973/1983 II. díl – DVD (2004)
- Prázdniny na Zemi, Ulice III. díl – DVD (2006)
- Trilogy Tour Live – DVD (2006)
- Procházka Historií 1 (2012)
- Procházka Historií 2 (2013)
- 50 (2013)
- 55 Live – DVD (2018)

Documentaries

- Django (2024)

== Awards and recognition ==
- 1981 Zlatý slavík – Best Group
- 1982 Zlatý slavík – Best Group
- 1983 Zlatý slavík – Best Group
- 1985 Bratislavská lýra – Gold record for "Co je vůbec v nás"
- 1996 Český slavík – Group of the Year
- 1997 Český slavík – Group of the Year
- 1998 Český slavík – Group of the Year
- inducted into the Beatová síň slávy (2019)
