= Žižkov freight railway station =

Railway station in Prague, Czech Republic

Praha-Žižkov
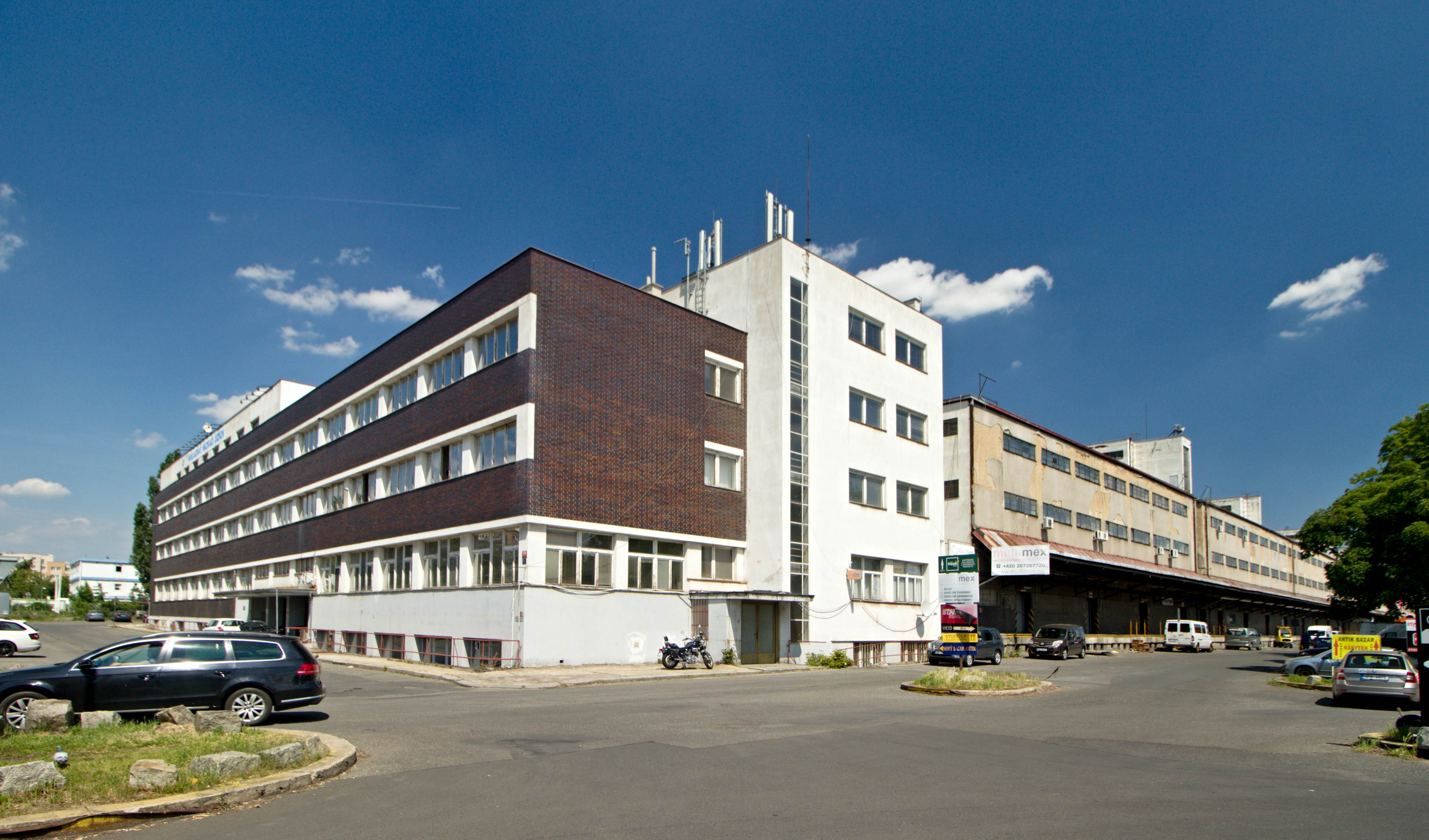

General information
- Location: Jana Želivského, Prague 3, Czech Republic
- Coordinates: 50.085278°N 14.476111°E

Other information
- Station code: 54573261

History
- Opened: 1 March 1936
- Closed: 2002
Location

Praha-Žižkov freight railway station (Czech: nákladové nádraží Žižkov) is a railway station formerly used for rail freight transport, located in the Žižkov district of Prague, Czech Republic. It was originally opened in 1936 and ceased operations in 2002. The station building was confirmed as a cultural monument in March 2013.

== Service ==
The station, which was built in an area previously known as Červený Dvůr, went into service on 1 March 1936. The buildings were designed by Karel Caivas and Vladimír Weiss, whereas Miroslav Chlumecký designed the track infrastructure. The purpose of the station was to relieve Prague city centre of freight train services. It was also used for warehousing, although the creation of a food warehouse in the district of Strašnice in 1966 reduced the demand at the station. The station's formal service ceased in 2002. The access track with a rail branching is used for a container terminal which is adjacent to the freight station building and is in service up to now.

== Usage beyond 2002 ==
Following its closure in 2002, parts of the station were leased to local businesses for use as a warehouse. The station hosted the Prague Biennale art exhibition in June 2013. In October of the same year, the 15th edition of the annual Designblok festival was hosted there. Redevelopment plans were proposed in November 2019. As of 2021, the site is included in the database of contaminated sites in the Czech Republic and will require remediation prior to any reuse.

== Cultural monument ==
The three-winged main station building was denoted as a national cultural monument in 2010 by the Ministry of Culture, a move which was quickly challenged by local government and members of the local real estate development industry including the Sekyra Group. Developers had wanted to use the area to construct a new residential area to house 15,000 people. The building's status was however secured in March 2013, with its historical, technical and architectural value among the reasons cited for its confirmed status. In December 2024 the city of Prague announced it will purchase the station and the area around it. The city plans to transform and develop it into a school, housing, cultural center, offices, and commercial spaces.

== Local transport ==
The station is served by Prague's tram network with a stop bearing the station's name.
