= Pavel Bobek =

Czech actor, presenter, and singer

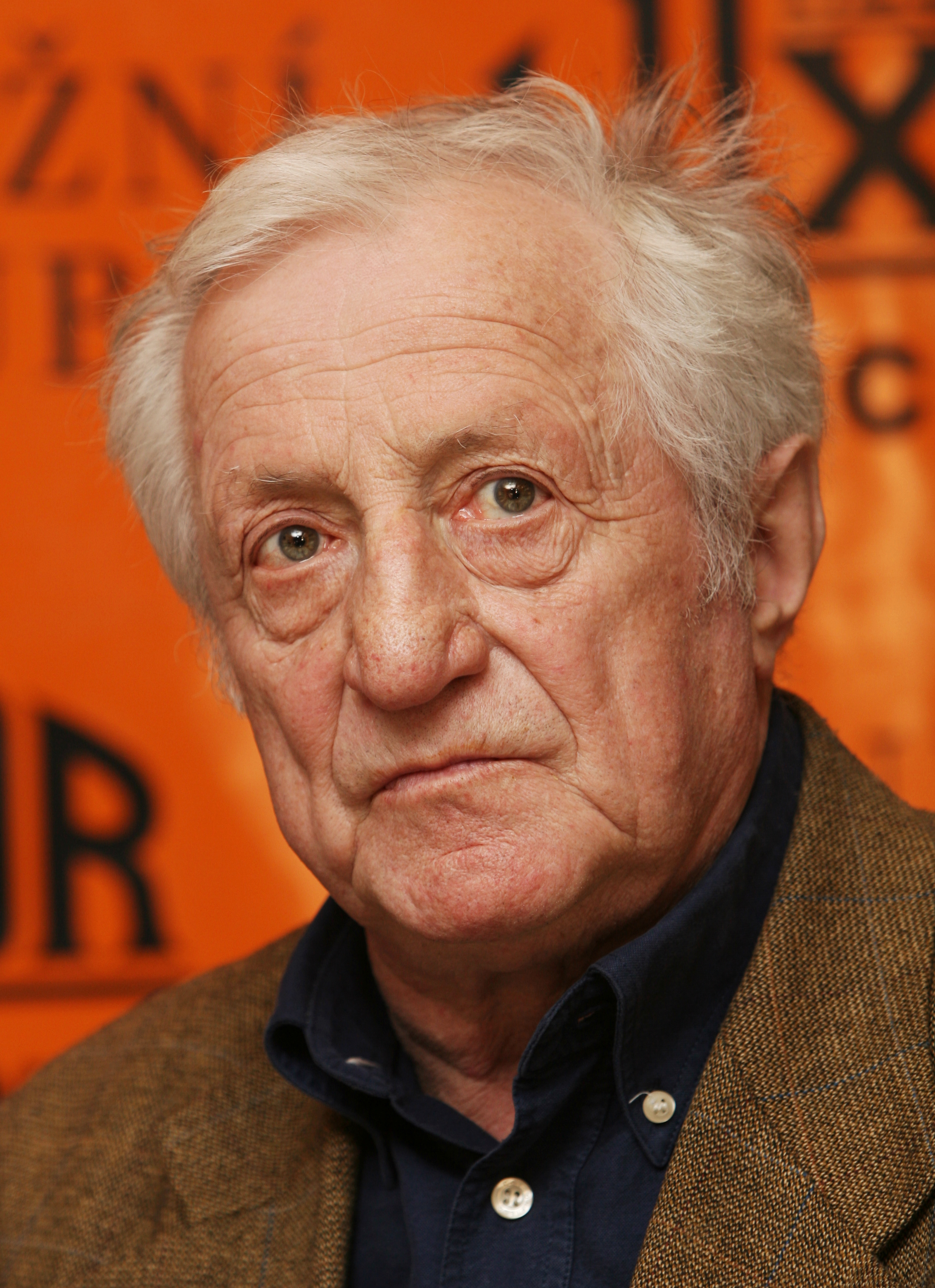
- Pavel Bobek in March 2008.

Background information
- Born: Pavel Bobek; 16 September 1937; Prague, Czechoslovakia
- Died: 20 November 2013 (aged 76) Prague, Czech Republic
- Genres: Country, pop, rock and roll
- Occupation: Singer
- Instrument: Vocals
- Years active: 1964–2013

Pavel Bobek (16 September 1937 − 20 November 2013) was a Czech singer.

== Career ==
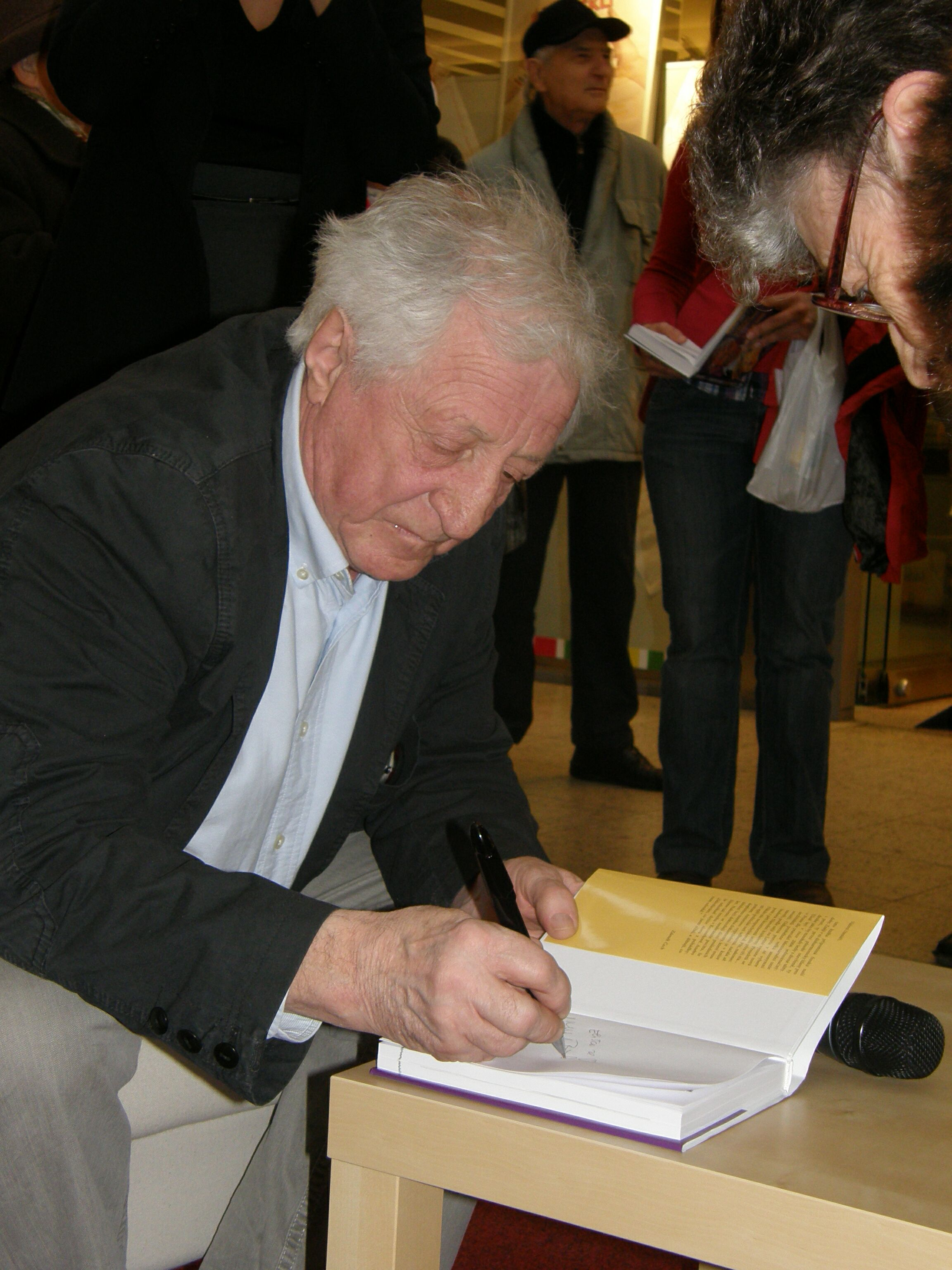
Bobek at a book signing in March 2009.

From 1963 to 1965 he was the vocalist of the pioneering classic rock group Olympic, and from 1967 he subsequently performed as a member of the Semafor Musical Theatre, with Jiří Brabec. During his career, he performed and recorded his own versions of rock-based standards, such as Lou Reed's "Walk On The Wild Side", and Frank Zappa's "Harder Than Your Husband". In the country style, Bobek covered Kenny Rogers' "Ruby, Don't Take Your Love To Town" (with Jiří Grossmann), and John Denver's "Take Me Home Country Roads" (the latter using Czech lyrics by Vladimír Poštulka).

=== Fame outside the Czech Republic ===
A fortuitous meeting with American country singer Johnny Cash in 1978 advanced his profile outside of the Czech Republic, when they got together on the floor of the US Embassy to sing the song "Will the Circle Be Unbroken" and, in 1980, he was awarded the Zlatá Porta za Zásluhy, a high Czech honour. With their historical connection in mind, in 2010 Bobek went to Nashville, Tennessee, United States, with producer Luboš Malina, where he made a CD of reworked Cash songs which he called "Víc Nehledám" ("Looking No More"). After a long serious illness, which almost cost him his voice years prior to his death, he partially returned to live concerts in May 2012, and released a new album called "Circles".

== Personal life ==
Bobek was born on 16 September 1937 in Prague, Czechoslovakia.

After attending high school, he went on to study architecture, among his classmates were Jan Kaplický, Eva Jiřičná and Petr Nárožný.

Bobek died on 20 November 2013, aged 76, in Prague, Czech Republic.
