= Yvonne Přenosilová =

Czech singer (1947–2023)

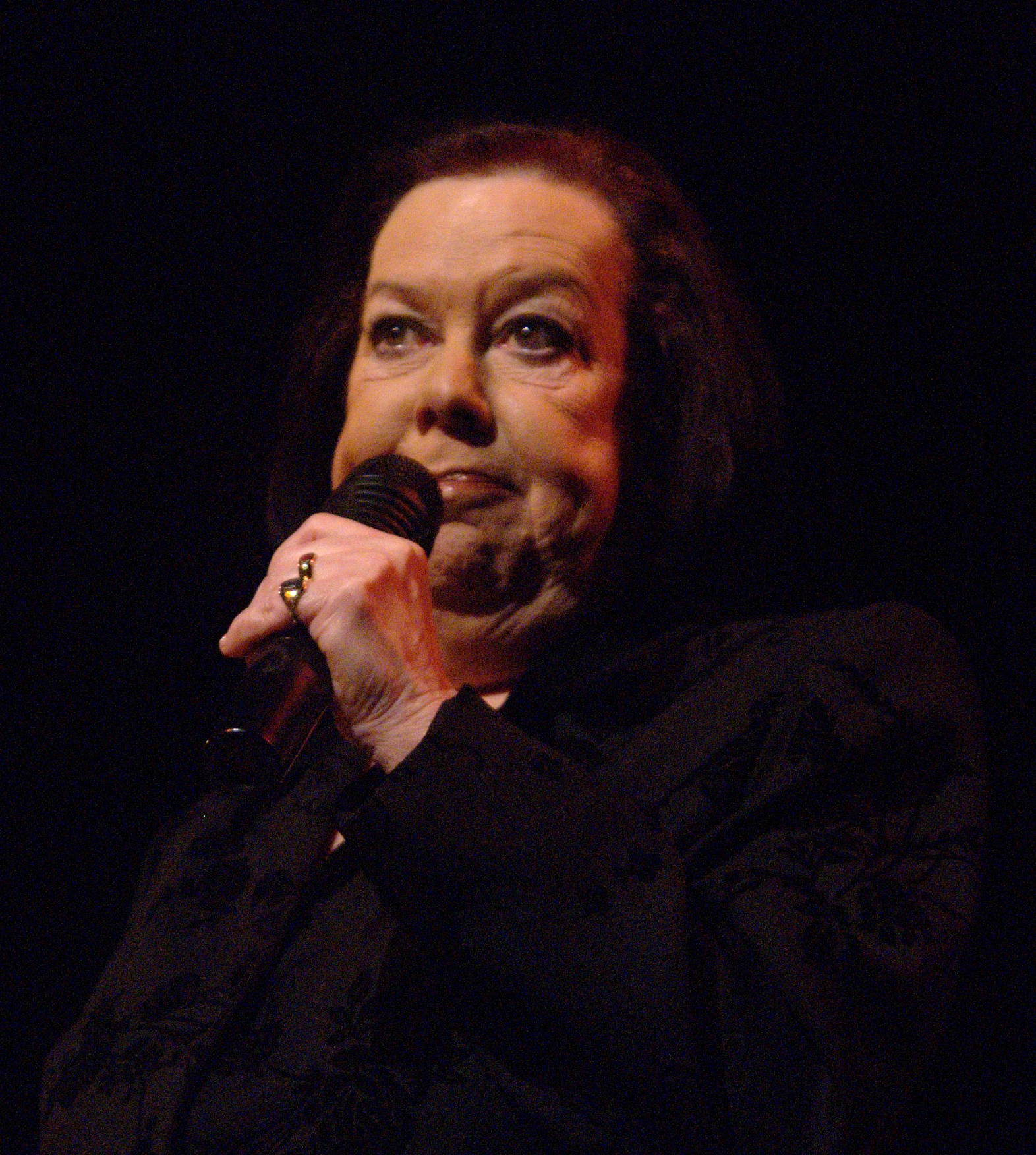
- Přenosilová in 2009
- Born: 2 July 1947; Prague, Czechoslovakia
- Died: 11 September 2023 (aged 76); Prague, Czech Republic
- Occupations: Singer; Actress

Yvonne Přenosilová (2 July 1947 – 11 September 2023) was a Czech singer, actress and radio and television presenter, mainly successful in the 1960s.

== Life and career ==
Born in Prague from a Jewish Czech father and an Austrian mother, in 1963 Přenosilová started her career with an audition at the Semafor Theatre, which was included in the film Konkurs (film) [Audition] by Miloš Forman.

In 1964, when she was just 16 years old, she had her breakout with "Roň slzy", a cover of Brenda Lee's "I'm Sorry", which became one of the best-selling Czech singles of the decade. Music critics did not receive the recording very well, but the song became a hit and one of the best-selling Czech singles of the 1960s. Yvonne continued to play in Semafor and sang other Czech remakes of foreign hits, as well as domestic song premieres. In 1965, she briefly spent time in London, where she recorded an English-language single for Pye Records and performed on radio and television, notably appearing in the ITV show Ready Steady Go!. However, she soon returned to Czechoslovakia and recorded many single 45s there up to 1968. Other hits of the time include the songs "Javory", "Tak prázdná", and "Boty proti lásce".

In 1968, Přenosilová signed the Two Thousand Words manifesto, and shortly after the Soviet invasion that ended the Prague Spring she moved with her family to Munich. There, she kept a lower-profile entertainment career, among other things collaborating with Radio Free Europe, while working as a British Airways employee. She eventually returned to Prague in 1994, and worked as a radio and television presenter and as a musical theatre performer. She also appeared in several films and television series. She died on 11 September 2023, at the age of 76.
