= Petr Spálený =

Czech musician and composer (born 1944)

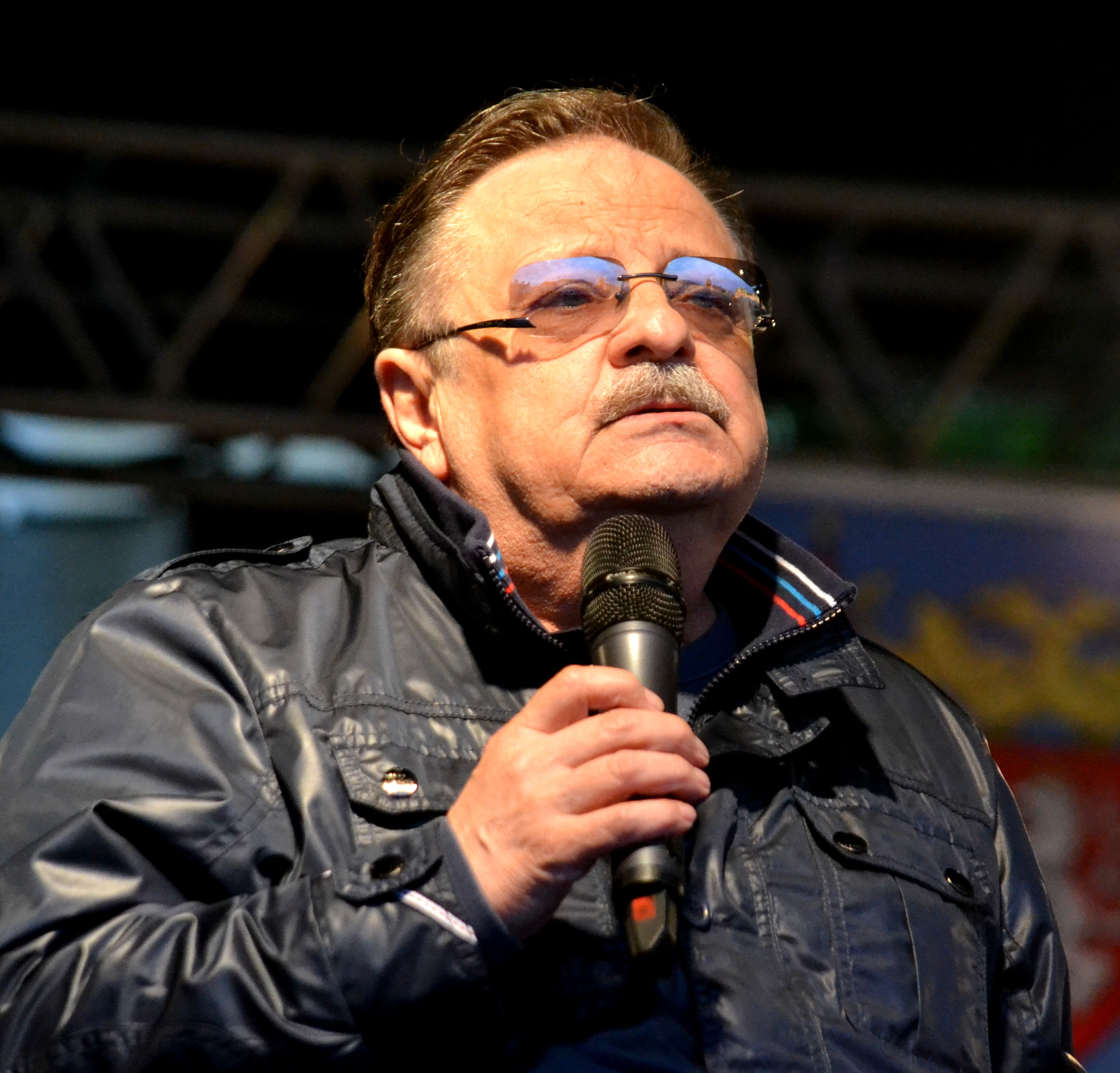
- Performance at 51st Kmochův Kolín (Kolín, 2014)

Background information
- Born: March 22, 1944 (age 82)
- Origin: Prague, Czechoslovakia
- Genres: pop, big beat, rock, country
- Occupations: Singer-songwriter; composer; actor
- Instruments: Vocals, guitar, flute, drums
- Years active: late 1950s–present
- Label: Supraphon
- Website: www.petrspaleny.cz

Petr Spálený (born March 22, 1944, in Prague) is a Czech musician and composer who plays guitar, flute and drums and sings. He is established on the boundaries of rock, country and pop music. He is notable for his phrasing that sounds similar to a melodic recitation and for a mix of singing and humming the melody. He earned a strong place in the Czech pop music scene. He has been active for over 40 years.

His brother, Jan Spálený, is a Czech musician and journalist, dramaturge and presenter for Czech Radio.

== Personal life ==
He has two daughters with his first wife, singer Pavlína Filipovská, Pavlína and Johanna. Pavlína is a journalist. His second wife is Czech singer Miluše Voborníková – together, they have a daughter named Barbora.

== Career ==
His career started in the late 1950s in amateur big-beat bands. First, he played drums, then added guitar and flute during his military service. After being discharged, he joined Hipps, his brother's band, which later changed its name (on suggestions from Jiří Štaidl) to Apollobeat. Then, Plakalo bejby, the first hit song by Petr Spalený, was recorded.

Later, he worked as a composer, composing music for all shows in Divaldo Jiřího Grossmanna and also music for the TV show Zajíc v pytli. He was cast into minor roles in several Czech films.

== Discography ==
- 1969 To vadí/Mečíky - Supraphon 0 43 0643 h, SP
- 1969 Petr Spálený a Apollobeat - Supraphon, LP
- 1970 Dáma při těle/Zbrojnoš - Supraphon 0 43 1064 h, SP
- 1971 Ústa dívky Dáši/Já chci plout s Magdalénou - Supraphon 1 43 1217 h, SP
- 1971 Zvon šílencův - Supraphon 1 13 0918, LP (issued on CD in 1996)
- 1971 Dáma při těle - Supraphon 1 13 1000, LP
- 1972 Petr v Lucerně - Supraphon 1 13 1107, LP
- 1972 Sail With Me - Artia 1 13 1190, LP
- 1973 Podoby - Supraphon (2LP) (issued on CD in 1997)
- 1974 Lásko je tě málo/Bílá Lydie - Supraphon 0 43 1641 h, SP
- 1979 Obyčejný muž/Houpací síť - Supraphon 1 43 2245, SP
- 1980 Peggy/Hotel Blues - Supraphon 1143 2425, SP
- 1980 Necítím se sám/Baletky - Supraphon 1143 2461, SP
- 1980 Dítě Štěstěny - Supraphon, LP (na MC, CD v 2001)
- 1980 Motel Nonstop - Supraphon, MC
- 1980 Hráč - Supraphon, MC
- 1981 Nemusíš se ptát/Motel Nonstop - Supraphon 1143 2504, SP
- 1982 Lady/Kam se lásky podějí - Supraphon 1143 2589, SP
- 1982 Cítím ten kouř/Pop music - Supraphon 1143 2628, SP
- 1982 Motel Nonstop - Supraphon 1113 3085 H, LP
- 1983 Highways and Country Road - Artia, LP
- 1984 Dům smíchu - Supraphon, LP, MC
- 1987 Svět se koulí dál - Supraphon, MC
- 1990 Hráč - Apollo Records Comp, LP
- 1990 Až mě andělé - Carrera, LP
- 1993 Best of Petr Spálený - Supraphon, CD (reissue 2003, CD, podtitul: Táňo, nashledanou 1967 • 73)
- 1993 Andělé - Apollo Records Comp, CD (sampler of hits)
- 1993 Pomalu a potichu - Apollo Records Comp, MC
- 1994 Jen mě vyzvi lásko na souboj - Apollo Records Comp, MC, CD
- 1996 Proč jsem tady - Apollo Records Comp, MC, CD
- 1996 Zvon šílencův - Bonton, CD (reedice LP z 1971)
- 1997 Podoby - Bonton, CD (reedice LP z 1973)
- 1998 Největší hity - Díky - Popron Music EAN: 8 590442 042925, MC, CD
- 2000 Největší hity 2 - Dáma při těle - Popron Music, MC, CD
- 2001 Dítě Štěstěny - Bonton, MC, CD (reedice LP z 1980)
- 2001 Na týhle planetě už zůstanu - Popron Music, MC, CD
- 2003 Gold - Popron Music, CD
- 2003 ... a ještě pár hitů - Popron Music, MC, CD
- 2004 Obyčejný muž, To nejlepší 1967–2004 - Supraphon SU 5517-2 312, (2CD)
- 2005 Jackpot - Supraphon SU 5640-2 331, CD
- 2008 Největší hity - 1 & 2 - Popron Music 204956 EAN: 8 590442 049566, CD
- 2008 Bylo fajn - Supraphon SU 5887-2 311, CD (subtitle: 20 originálních hitu 1969–2008)
- 2010 Dítě Štěstěny - Supraphon SU 6018-2 313, (3CD), (subtitle: Největší hity 1967–2010)
- 2013 Můj dým - EMI Music, CD

== Filmography ==
Year	Title	Role	Notes
1980	Trhák	předseda MNV (mayor) Emil Rambousek	
1973	Noc na Karlštejně	squire	
1968	Gramohit 68	himself	TV movie
