= Klika =

Klika is a surname. Notable people with the surname include:

- Bill Klika, (born 1945), American football and baseball coach
- Bohumil Klika (1868–1942), Czech zoologist and paleontologist, also known as Gottlieb Klika
- Čeněk Klika, Czech Scouting official
- Miloš Klika (1890–?), Bohemian fencer
- Russell Klika (born 1960), American military photojournalist
