= Zapletal =

Zapletal (feminine: Zapletalová) is a Czech surname. Notable people with the surname include:

- Emma Zapletalová (born 2000), Slovak athlete
- Jan Zapletal (disambiguation), multiple people
- Lubomír Zapletal (born 1951), Czech rower
- Miloš Zapletal (1930–2025), Czech writer, and scout official
- Petr Zapletal (born 1977), Czech volleyball player
- Václav Zapletal (born 1985), Czech footballer
- Vojtěch Zapletal (born 1998), Czech canoeist
- Vojtěch Zapletal (composer) (1877–1957), Czech composer
