= Dagmar Skálová =

Czech Scout and political prisoner

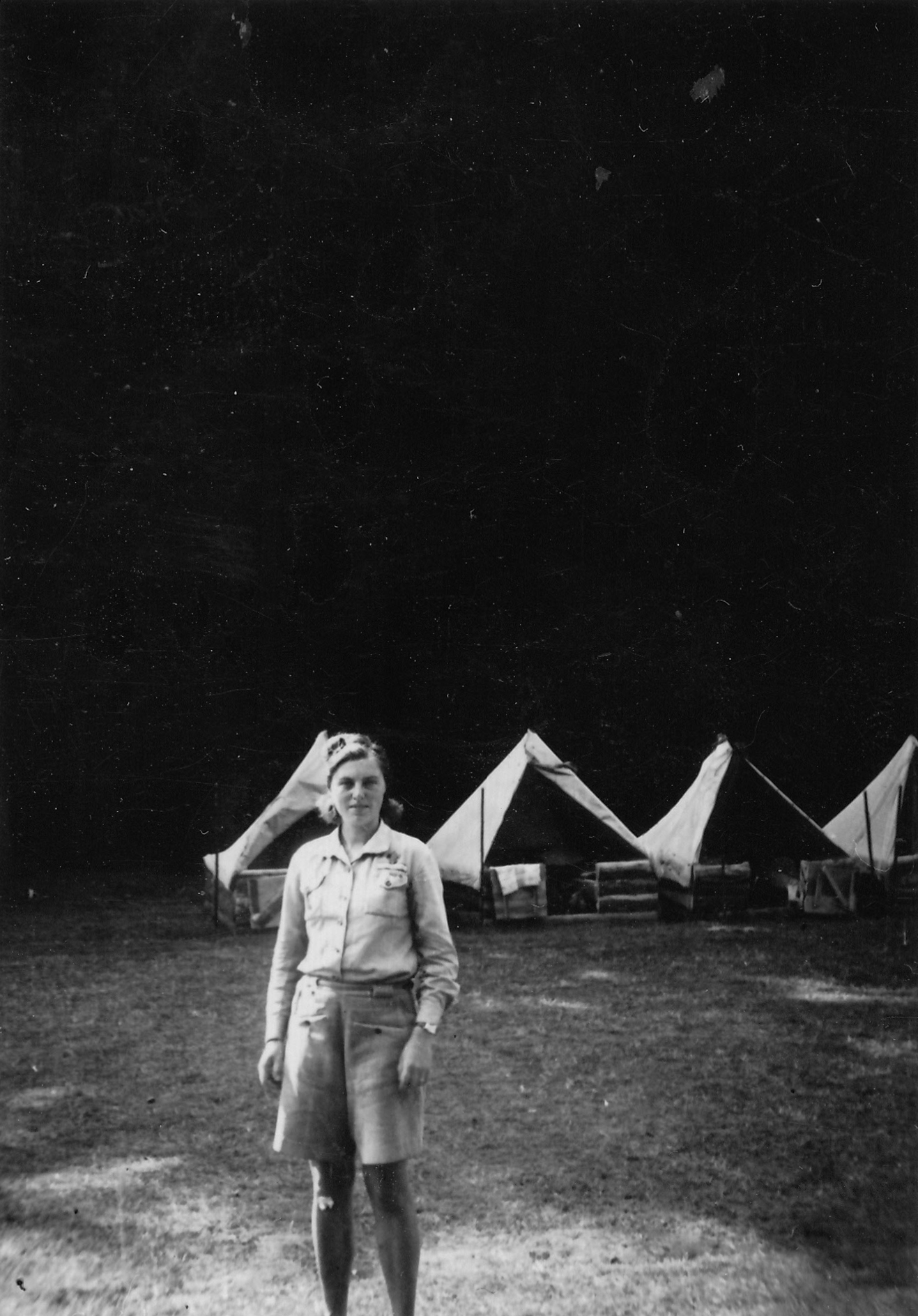
- Skálová in 1940
- Born: Dagmar Šimková; 6 November 1912; Plzeň, Bohemia, Austria-Hungary
- Died: 15 July 2002 (aged 89); Plzeň, Czech Republic
- Burial place: Plzeň Central Cemetery
- Organization: Junák
- Spouse: Karel Skála

Dagmar Skálová (née Šimková; 6 November 1912 – 15 July 2002) was a Czech Scout and a political prisoner.

== Early life ==
Dagmar Šimková was born on 6 November 1912 in Plzeň in Bohemia, Austria-Hungary, and christened Dagmar Eleonora Věnceslava. She attended elementary, secondary and high school in Plzeň. In 1934 she started Scouting, where she acquired the nickname Rakša (Raksha), based on the mother wolf from Rudyard Kipling's The Jungle Book. She subsequently led a Scout troop in the Šipka group in Prague. She practised Scouting together with her husband, Karel Skála, who served as a Prague Scout leader before 1948.

== Background ==
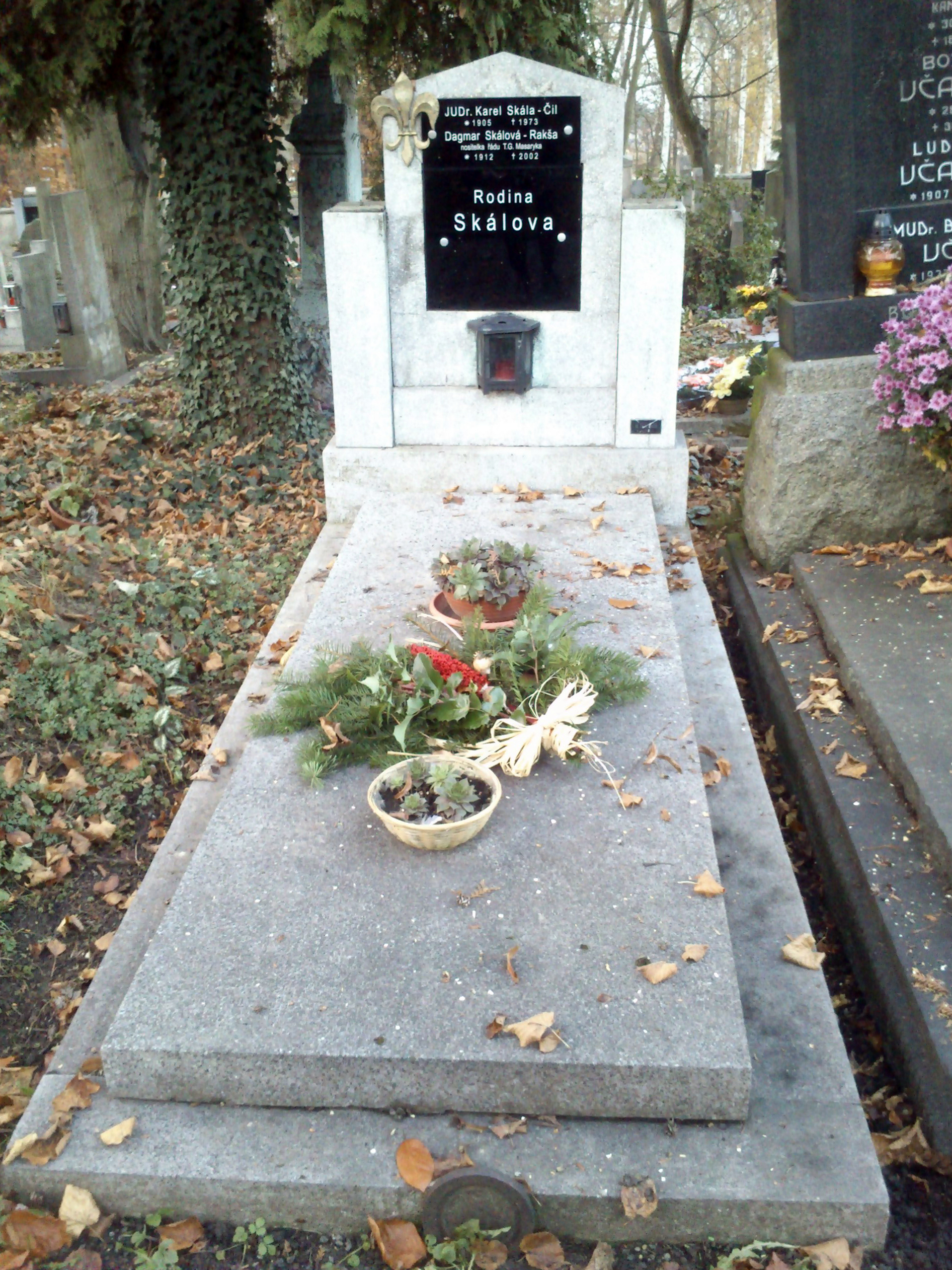
Dagmar Skálová and Karel Skála's grave at the Plzeň Central Cemetery

Scouting in Hungary was banned at the beginning of the Second World War. After the communist coup in Czechoslovakia in 1948 she joined the anti-communist resistance. On 17 May 1949 she was arrested in connection with the preparations of the Prokeš coup, in which several Scouts were involved, among others František Falerski, Jiří Řehák, Pavel Holý and Ivan Kieslinger. She was supposed to provide communications and medical care to the rebels, cooperating with Jiří Navrátil, then a leader of the 2nd Prague Water Scout troop. Her husband Karel was involved in the planning of the whole operation.

The coup attempt was discovered in May 1949 and the organizers arrested. During interrogation, Dagmar Skálová attempted to shift all the blame to herself in hopes of averting any death penalties, since no women had been sentenced to death until a later trial with Milada Horáková. Dagmar Skálová succeeded, after communicating with other arrested, including using Morse code, in convincing the StB that all the Scouts involved assumed they are only playing a night game organized in the streets of Prague by the local branch of the Czech Scouting organization, Junák. This resulted in the release of most of them. On 8 May 1949 she was sentenced to life imprisonment; Jiří Navrátil was sentenced to 20 years imprisonment alongside her.

She remained in prison until 1965. Even there, she remained active – in 1956 she and a group of other women sent a letter to the UN General Secretary with a protest against human rights violations in Czechoslovakia.

In 1997, she received the Order of Tomáš Garrigue Masaryk.

She died in 2002 and is buried at the Plzeň Central Cemetery together with her husband.
