= Ivančena =

Scout memorial in the Czech Republic

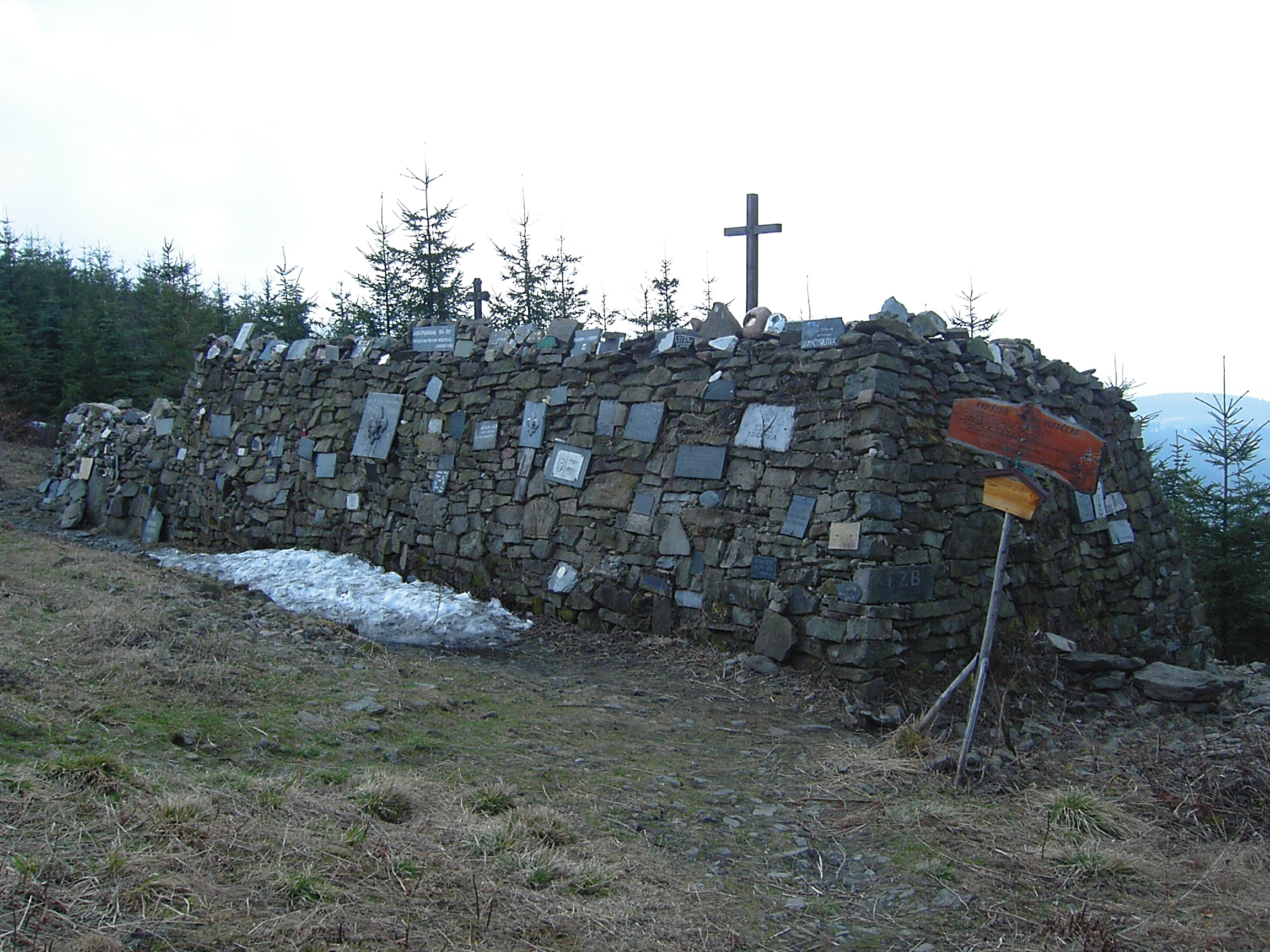
- Ivančena in 2003
- Interactive map of Ivančena
- Location: Lysá hora
- Coordinates: 49°34′02″N 18°26′17″E
- Material: Stone
- Beginning date: 6 October 1946
- Website: www.ivancena.cz

Ivančena is a stone cairn erected as a memorial for five Scouts, members of the Silesian Scout Resistance, who were executed in April 1945 in Cieszyn, modern-day Poland, for their part in the Czech resistance to Nazi occupation during World War II. The monument is located on Lysá hora, a mountain in the Moravian-Silesian Beskids in the Czech Republic. Annually near Saint George's Day (23 April), Czech Scouts make a pilgrimage to the site.

== Background ==
The name Ivančena comes from the original owner of the place, Ivanka, and the cairn stands approximately about 4 meters (13 ft) tall and 10 meters (33 ft) long. During the time of communism, scouts, trampers, and others hiked to it while Scouting was illegal. The hikes were monitored by the then Czechoslovak communist secret police.

The cairn was founded by the 30th Scout section of Moravian Ostrava on 6 October 1946 to commemorate five members of the "Resistance of the Silesian Scout organization" who were executed on 24 April 1945, in Teshino in the Jewish cemetery. The scouts erected a simple cross near the summit of Lysá hora. They placed it on a pile of stones, where they also placed a bottle with a short message.

Stones began to pile up around the cross, which were placed on it by passers-by to honor the memory of the dead. Stone by stone, a mound began to grow, which over time, despite the advent of communism in 1948 and the subsequent banning of the Czech Scouting organization Junák, began to turn from a small memorial to fallen comrades into a symbol of Scout indomitability and a protest against lack of freedom. Scouts, trampers, but also ordinary people began to remember other heroes of the anti-Nazi resistance by climbing Ivančena. They also expressed their defiance against the ruling Bolshevism.

During the Prague Spring, there was a brief revival of Junák, and ascents to Ivančena began to become a regular event attended by thousands of people. The tradition has continued ever since. In 1969, chief Scout Rudolf Plajner, commemorated the mound "... for the memorial of all the heroic victims in the fight for free democratic Czechoslovakia."

However, the communist regime in Czechoslovakia began to strongly fear similar actions, so it tried to prevent trips to Ivančena. Bans, controls and orders culminated in April 1981, when a large group of armed members of the StB vainly tried to provoke the participants into some kind of "anti-socialist reaction". The secret police did not have the power to monitor and control all visitors to the Beskid mountains. With time, the mound continued to grow. In the days of non-freedom, the "tourist" groups of Sláva Moravec and Karel Líba cared for the mound, and trampers and the gamekeeper Kaňok from Jestřábí also contributed to its maintenance. Various tablets with messages and slogans were added to the stones, with which their creators expressed not only tribute to the murdered heroes, but also opposition to all forms of totalitarian power. In 1989, opposition to the hikes disappeared after the Velvet Revolution.

In December 1994, the mound was severely damaged when unknown vandals damaged the mound and the plaques. Consequently, an initiative managed to raise sufficient funds to reconstruct the mound. Foundations were built, and the mound was moved a few meters from the ridge so that it would not interfere with the division of the three local municipalities. It was also supplemented with a memorial stele and ceremonially consecrated by Bishop František Lobkowicz.

In 2015, a working group at the Junák Regional Council of the Moravian-Silesian Region began to prepare for a reconstruction of the cairn. A fund-raising drive was announced for its restoration. In 2017, the reconstruction was completed, and the mound took on a new form.

Until 1989, the mound was also a symbol of resistance against oppression during communism. The mound is now a symbol of patriotism, courage and friendship.

== Pilgrimage ==
During the communist era of Czechoslovakia, Scouts, trampers and other hikers trekked to Ivančena. These hikes were monitored by the State Security. Pilgrimages to the mound continue to this day. Each year, on a Saturday near Saint George's Day (23 April), Czech Scouts make a pilgrimage to the site. Since 1996, when a plaque commemorating the "Resistance of the Silesian Heroes" was placed at the Jewish cemetery in Cieszyn, Poland, a commemorative event has also been held there as part of the pilgrimage. The mound is still growing and is made of stones from around the world.

== Gallery ==
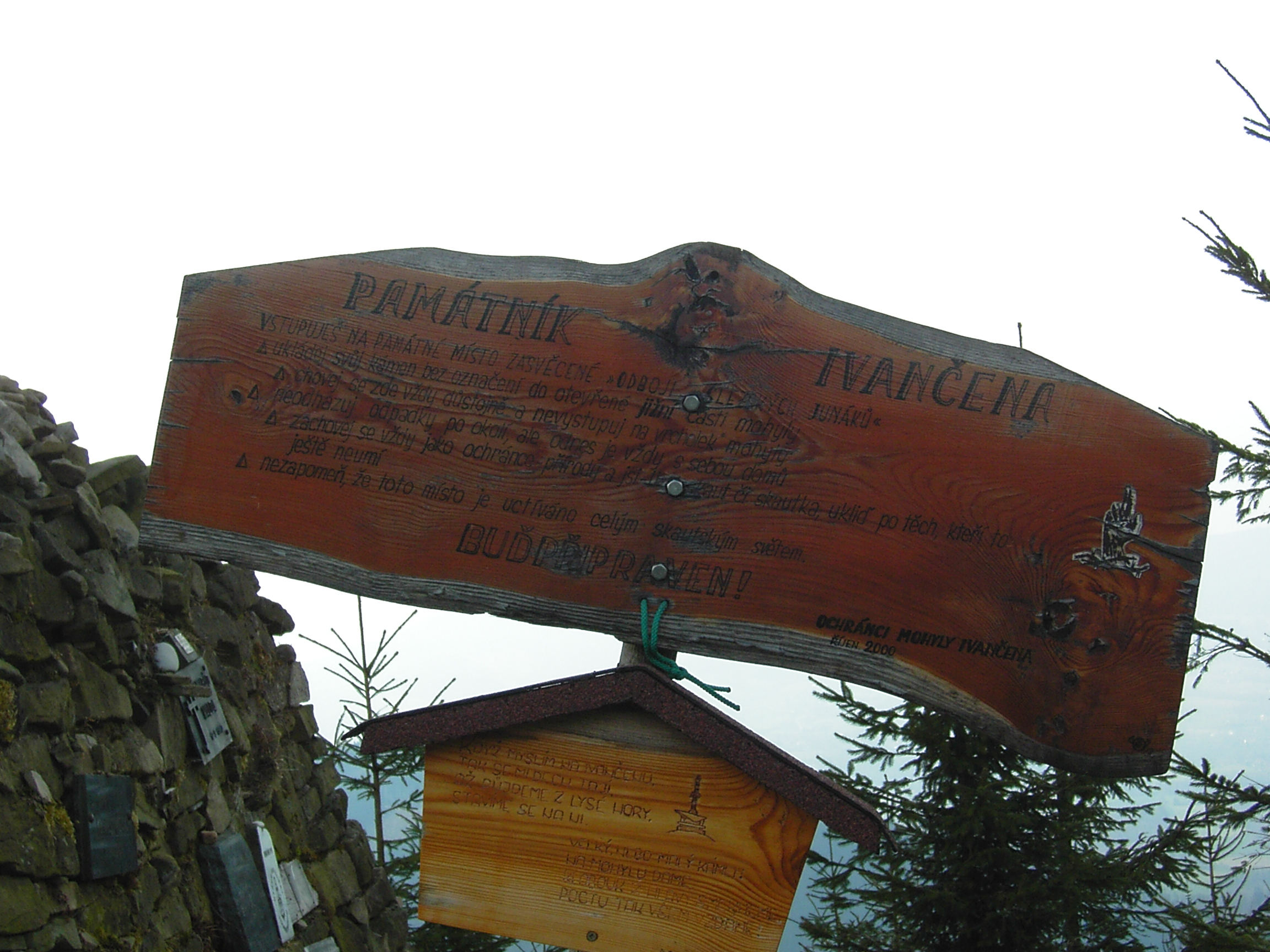
Sign at the mound

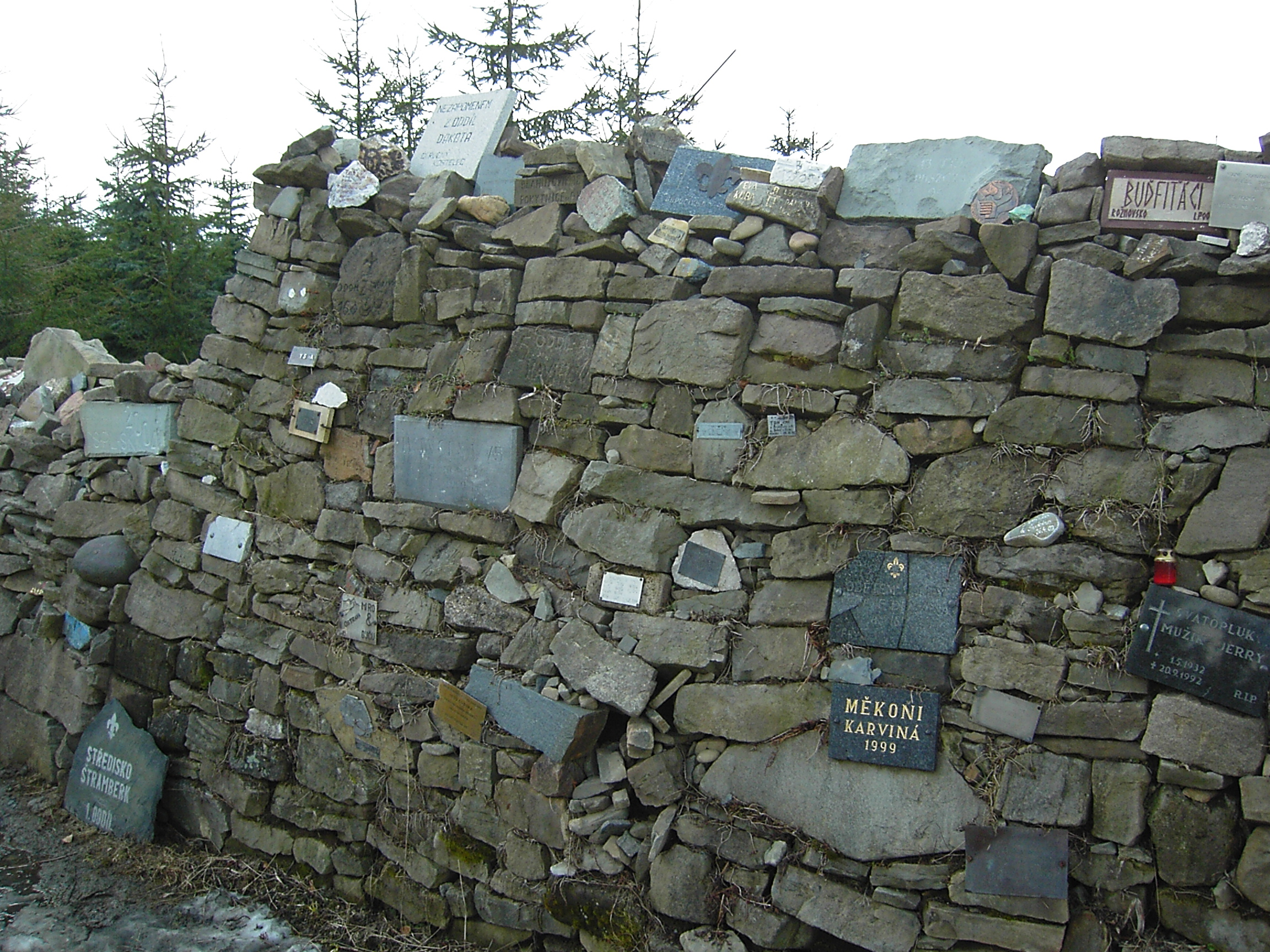
The mound

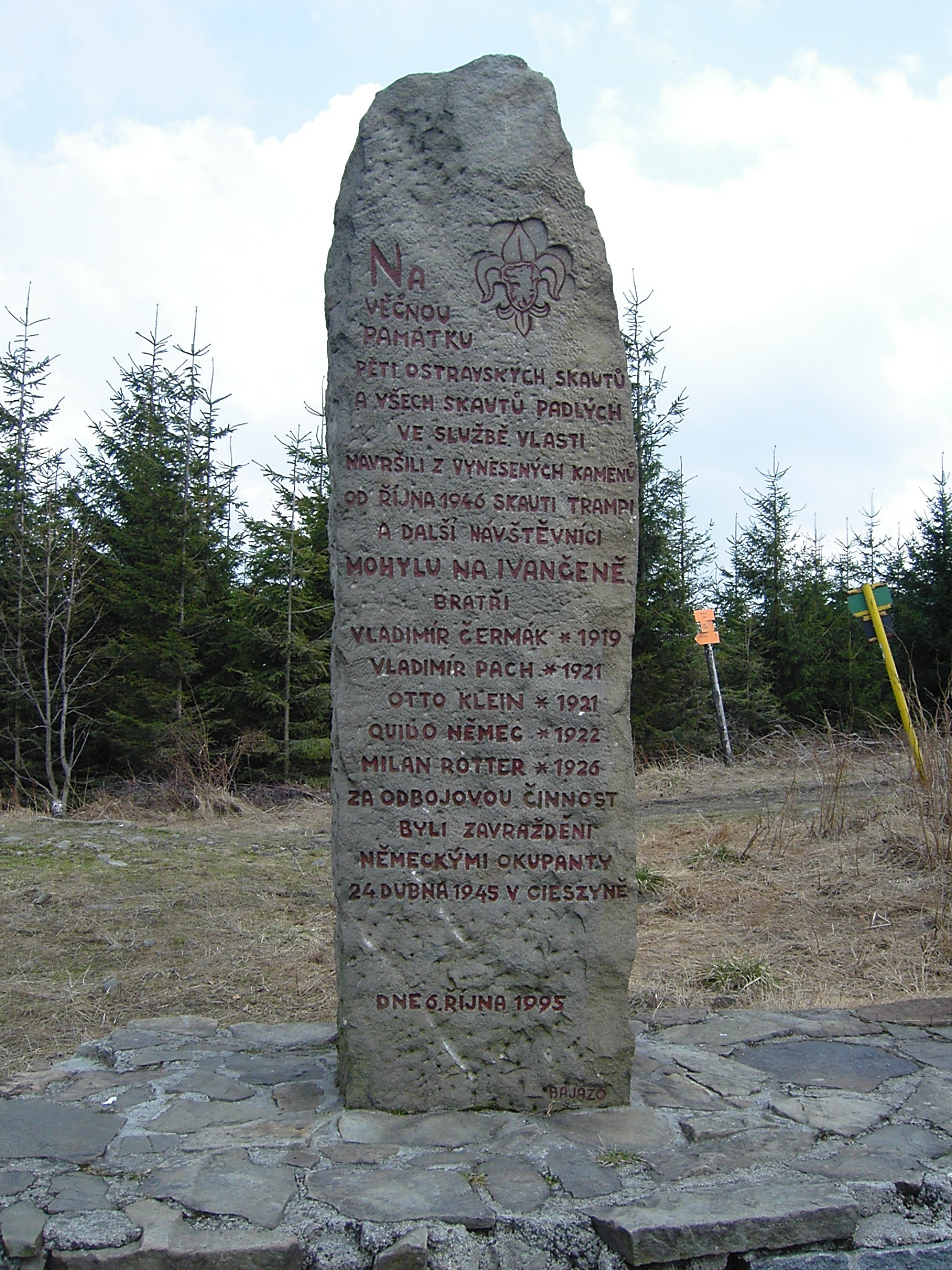
Stele with the names of the deceased

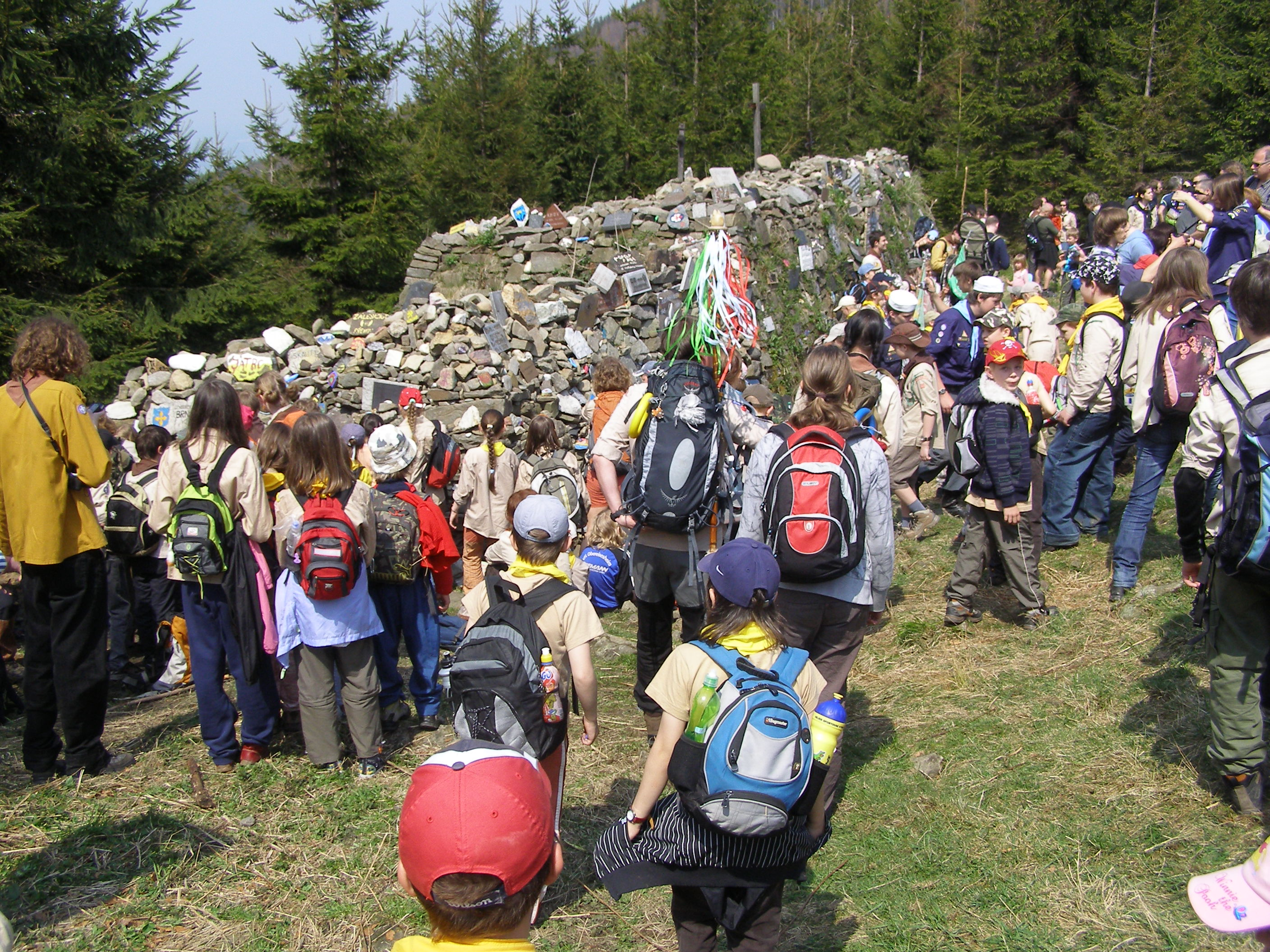
2011 - Meeting of scouts at Ivančena

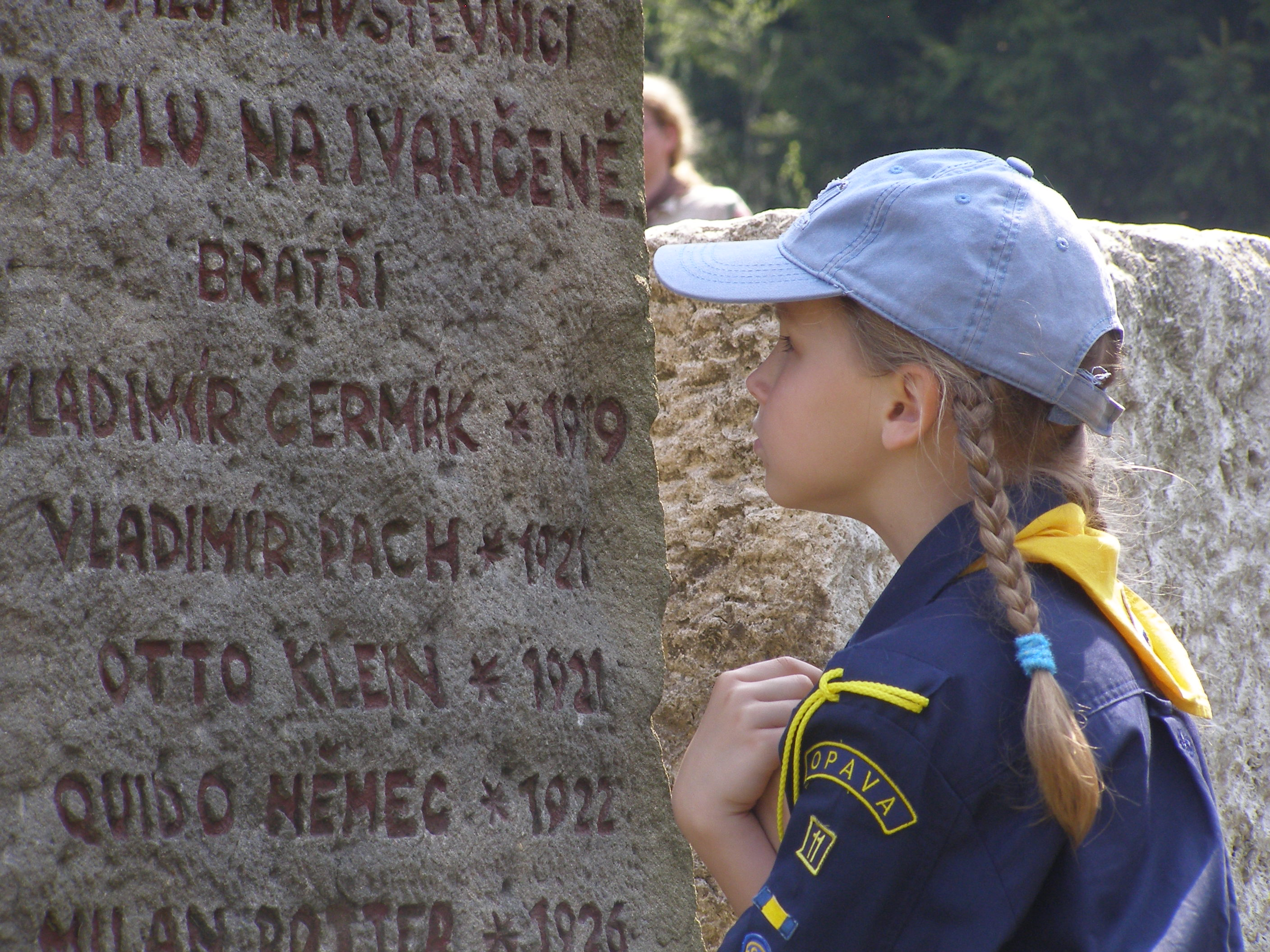
2011 - Young Scout examining the names

== See also ==
- List of Scouting memorials
