= Jiří Navrátil =

Czech scout

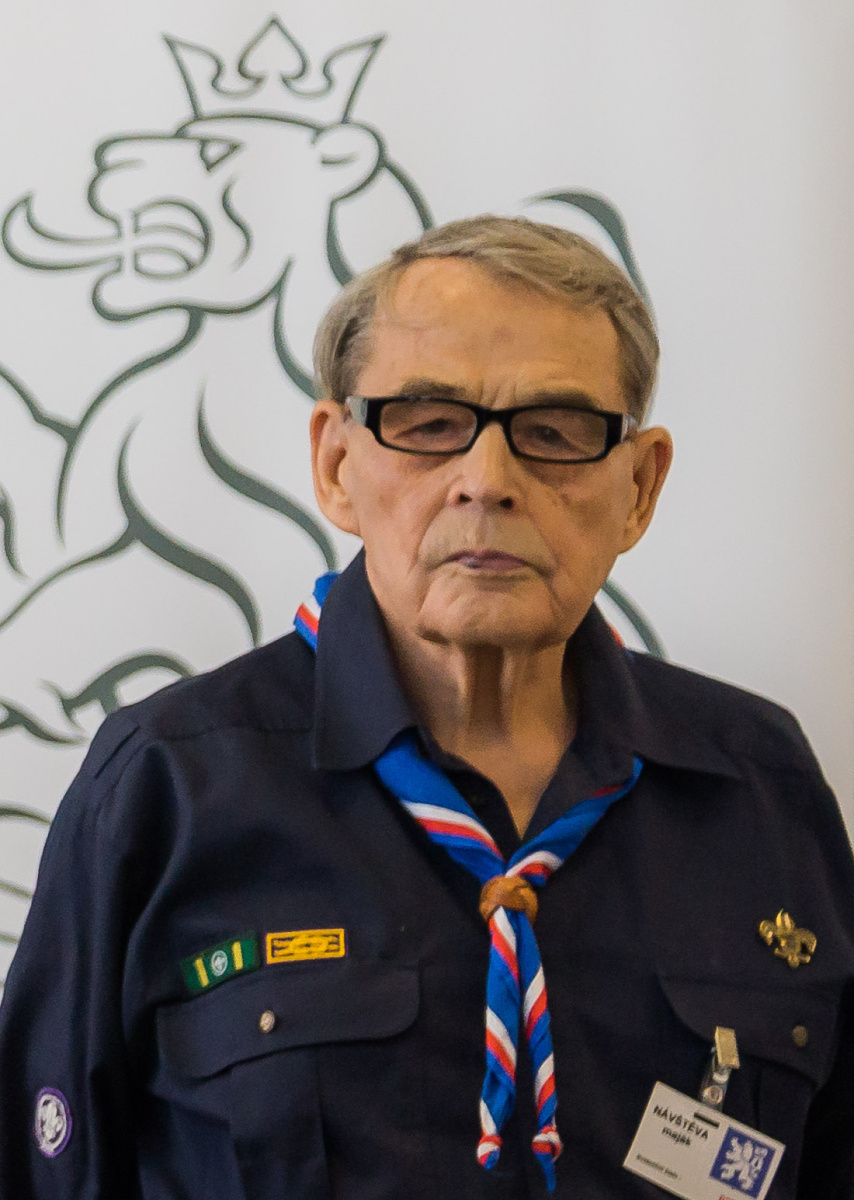

President of Junák

Personal details
- Born: 10 September 1923 Leipzig, Germany
- Died: 16 January 2017 (aged 93) Prague, Czech Republic

Jiří Navrátil (10 September 1923 – 16 January 2017) was a Czech translator, journalist, political prisoner of the Communist regime and Scout who served as the President of Junák, the Czech national Scout and Guide association.

Navrátil was born in Germany where his father was a consul. In 1937 he became a Scout in Prague. He was arrested and held several months by the Gestapo during World War II. In 1949, he tried to oppose the Communist takeover of Czechoslovakia with other Scouts. Along with Dagmar Skálová, he was sentenced to 20 years in prison, and was released in 1960.

He took part in the renewal of Scouting in Czechoslovakia in 1968. Following the third renewal of Scouting in 1989, Navrátil became a member of the Central Committee of Junák and, later on in 1992, was elected to serve as a President of Junák. He stayed on to serve as a vice-president of Junák from early 2000s until his death in 2017.

== Background ==
During the Prague Spring in 1968, Navrátil was one of the refounders of Junák, the Czech Scout movement, which was suppressed again in 1970. Following the Velvet Revolution in 1989, he became one of the main Leaders of the third restoration of Junák.

He was one of the facilitators of the 1999 10th European Conference of Guiding and Scouting in Prague, in which President Václav Havel gave the opening speech.

In 2002, Navrátil was awarded the 292nd Bronze Wolf, the only distinction of the World Organization of the Scout Movement, awarded by the World Scout Committee for exceptional services to world Scouting.

Jiří Navrátil was married to Běla Navrátilová, née. Válková, they had one son named Tomáš. Navrátil was one of the founders of the Masaryk Democratic Movement in Prague in November 1989.

Navrátil died on 16 January 2017 at the age of 93.
