= Velen (disambiguation) =

Velen is a town in Germany.

Velen may also refer to:

- Veleň, a municipality and village in the Czech Republic
- Malá Veleň, a municipality and village in the Czech Republic
- Oldřich Velen (1921–2013), Czech actor
- Velen Fanderlik (1907–1985), Czech educator and scout
- Velen., taxonomic author abbreviation of Josef Velenovský (1858–1949), Czech botanist
