= Miloš Zapletal =

Czech writer, pedagogue and Scout official (1930–2025)

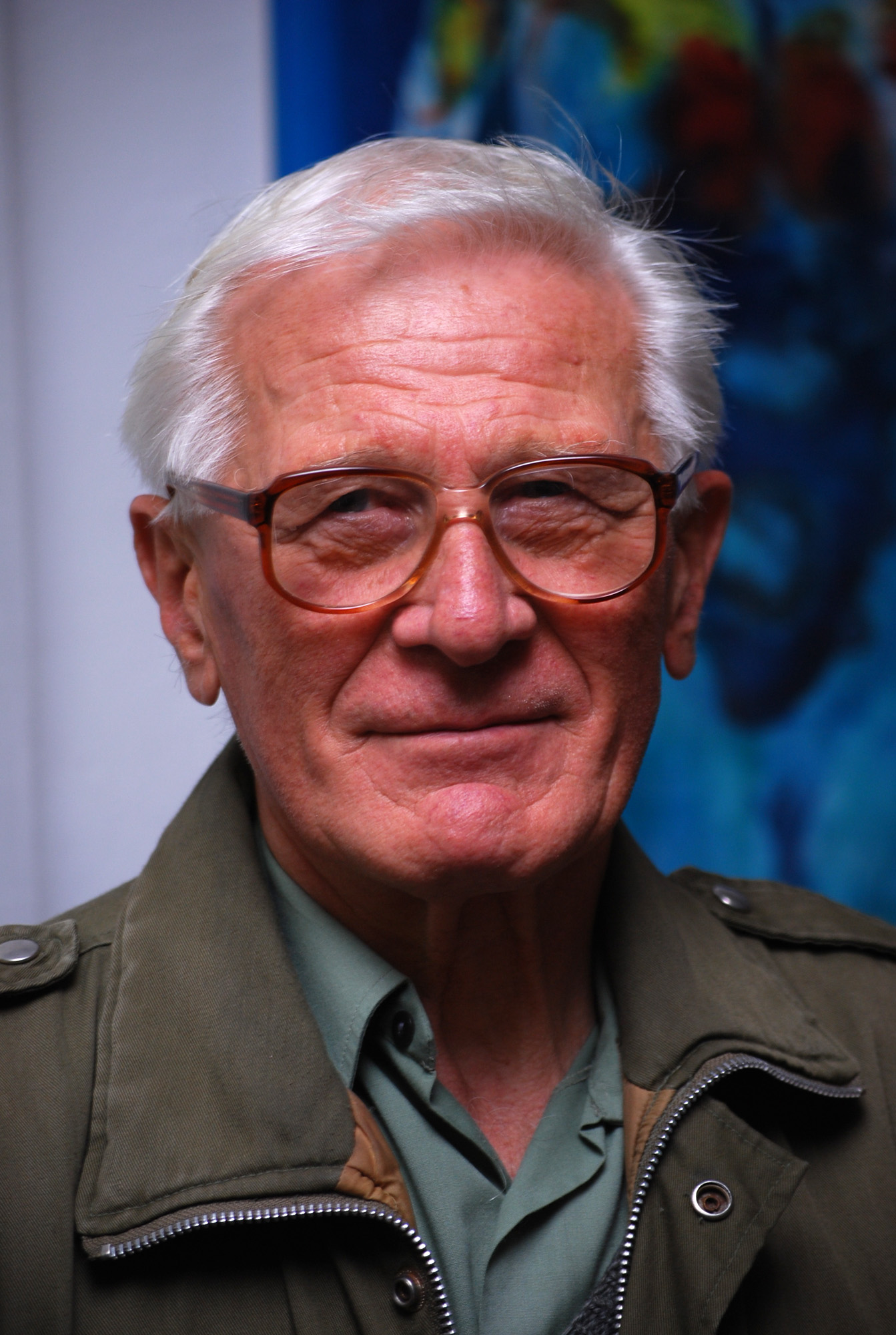
- Zapletal in 2009
- Born: 13 January 1930; Prostějov, Czechoslovakia
- Died: 8 May 2025 (aged 95); Liberec, Czech Republic
- Occupations: Writer, editing staff, translator
- Awards: Silver Medal of the President of the Senate (2020)

Miloš Zapletal (13 January 1930 – 8 May 2025), also known as Zet, was a Czech writer of youth literature, pedagogue and Scout official.

== Life and career ==
Zapletal grew up in Pardubice, where he joined a boating Scout troop at the age of fifteen. He graduated from the Faculty of Education of Charles University in Prague, majoring in physical education, and before embarking on his literary career he briefly worked as a physical education teacher. At the end of the 1950s, he moved to Liberec, where he led a Scout troop, after the dissolution of Junák in 1970, transformed into a tourist troop.

After the renewal of Scouting in 1989, he played a significant role in the renewal of the publication of Scout magazines. In Liberec, he founded the Scouting publishing house and created the Scout Springs series, which published a number of the first post-revolutionary Scout methodological manuals; he participated in many of them as an author. He co-founded the FONS Scout courses, which significantly influenced the form of Scout education.

He was also active as a translator; he translated more than ten books by E. T. Seton from English and the stories, essays and speeches of Rabindranath Tagore from Bengali.

He was considered to be the successor of Jaroslav Foglar, with whom he also collaborated and worked as an editor of his chronicle books.

In 2020, he was awarded the Silver Medal of the President of the Senate of the Czech Republic.

Zapletal died on 8 May 2025, at the age of 95.

== Awards and recognition ==
- Medal of Merit (2025)
