= Vlasta Koseová =

Czech activist (1895–1973)

- Born: Vlasta Štěpánová; 21 May 1895; Sedlec, Bohemia, Austria-Hungary
- Died: 29 September 1973 (aged 78); Prague, Czechoslovakia
- Education: University of Prague; Vassar College
- Known for: Founding Czech Girl Scouts

Vlasta Koseová (née Štěpánová; 21 May 1895 – 29 September 1973) was a Czech activist. She was the founder of Czech Girl Scouting. In January 1915, the first Girl Scouts were introduced, under her leadership, and shortly thereafter, a Junák section for Guide Education was established. In 1923 she married Dr. Jaroslav Kose, who was executed in 1942 in Brno Kounic college. For her work in Scouting, she received top Junák Girl Scouting honors including Order of the Silver Trefoil.
