= Vojta Kiďák Tomáško =

Czech siger-songwriter (born 1947)

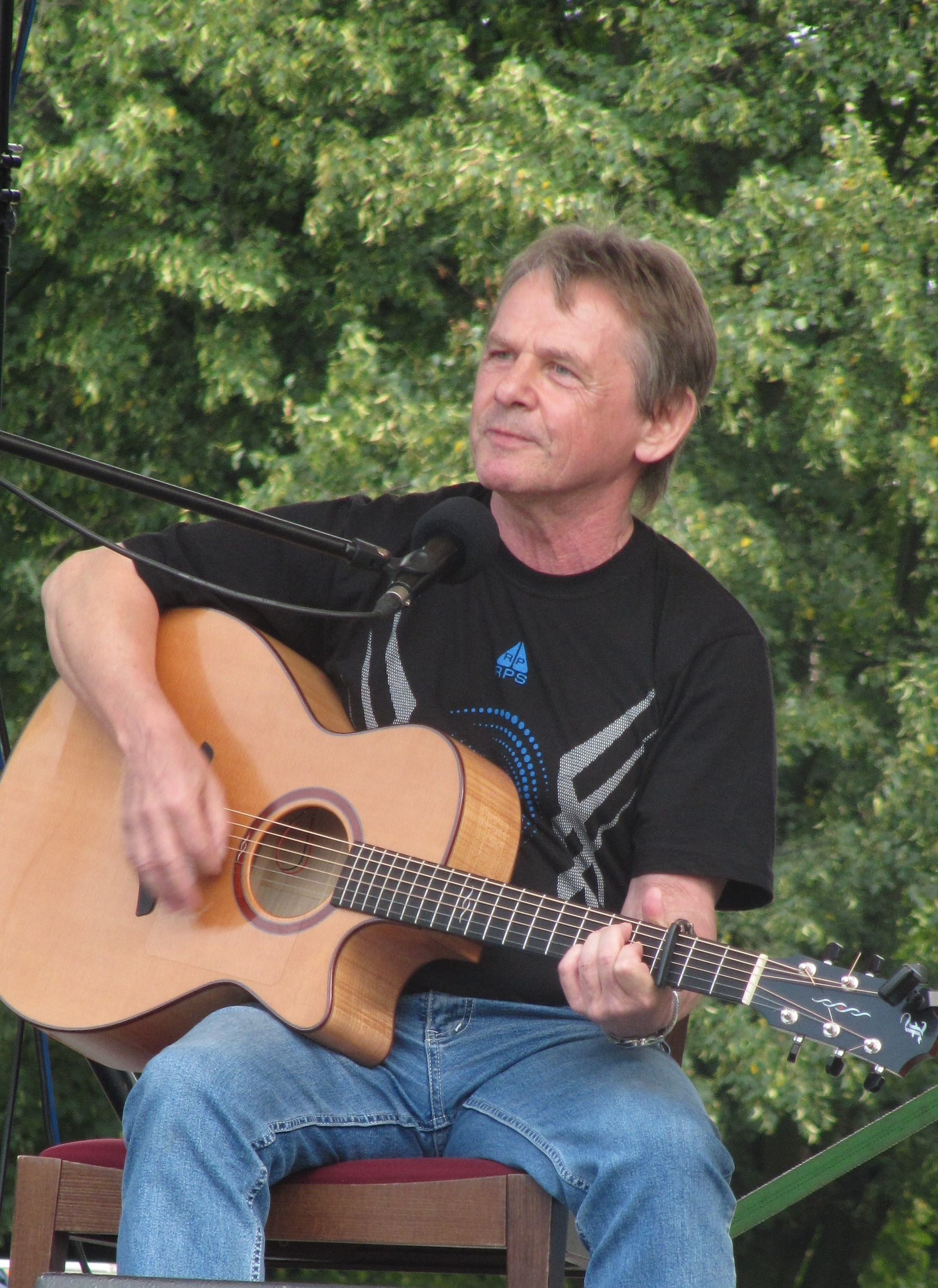
Vojta Kiďák Tomáško, 2013

Vojta "Kiďák" Tomáško (birth name: Vojtěch Tomáško; born 1947) is a Czech singer-songwriter working in the styles of Czech tramping music and folk song.

== Biography ==
He is a former member (and a founder) of Roháči tramp and folk music group from Loket.

After Roháči, he herformed alone for some time, then he and Lubomír "Ríša" Melichar, also former musician from Roháči, formed a duo and played for 15 years together. As of 2026, Vojta performs mostly single.

He authored over 300 songs and song lyrics (collected in two songbooks, Toulavej I and Toulavej II. He also writes for other singers.

== Discography ==
- 1990 Toulavej
- 1992 V. K. Tomáško II.
- 1994 Nejsme svatý
- 1996 Jestlipak víš
- 2000 Hvězdopad
- 2002 Náklaďák do L.A.
- 2007 Srpnové trávy – 2CD
- 2011 Hádej, kdo tě má rád
- 2015 Jak dravá voda
- 2018 25 NEJ...
- 2021 Všechno je tak, jak má být

== Awards ==
- 1979, 1981: Author's Porta Award at the competitive Porta Festival
- 1981: Golden Porta Award at the Porta Festival
