= Antonín Benjamin Svojsík =

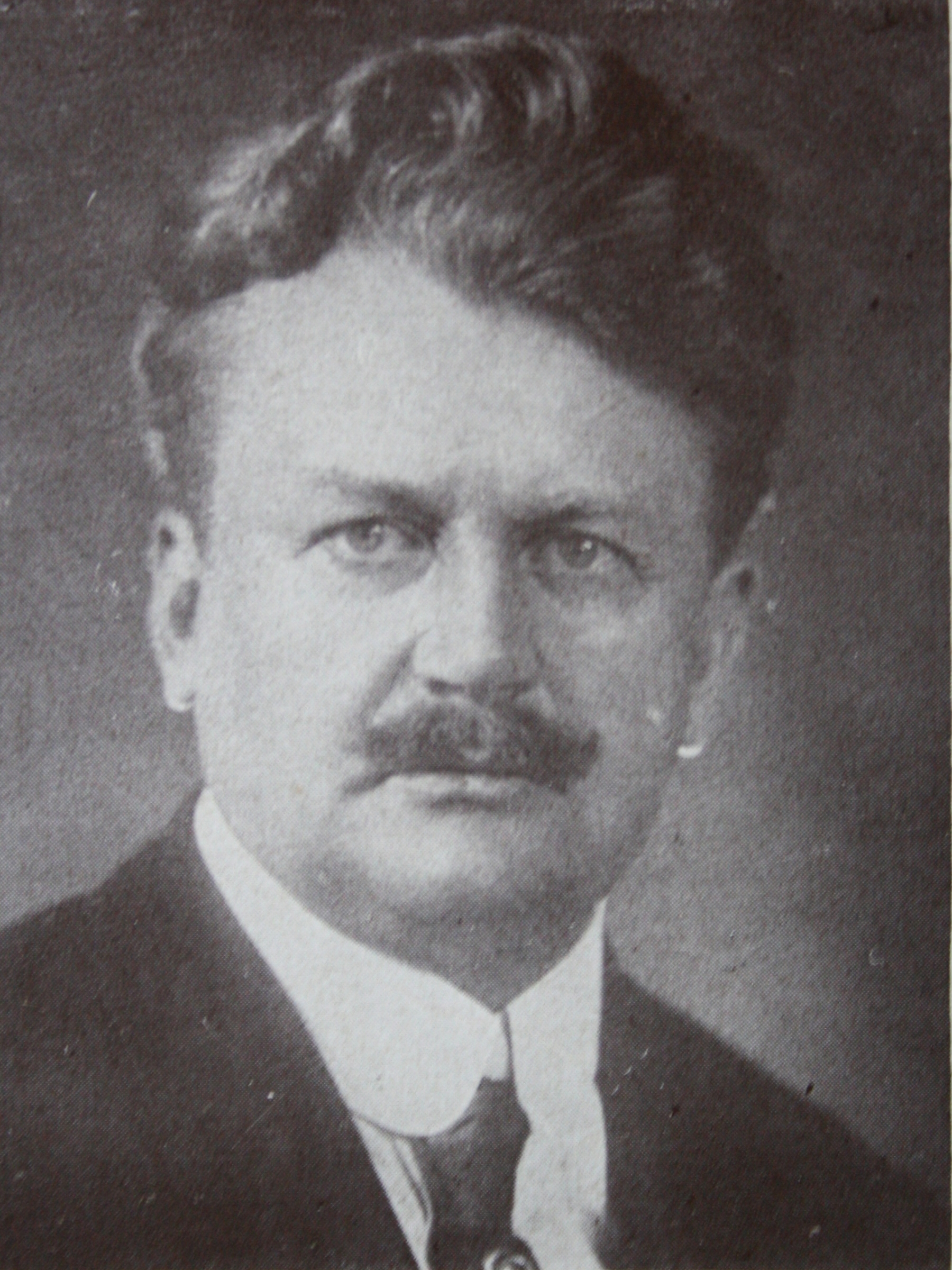
- Svojsík in c. 1927
- Born: Antonín František Svojsík; 5 September 1876; Prague, Bohemia, Austria-Hungary
- Died: 17 September 1938 (aged 62); Prague, Czechoslovakia
- Resting place: Vyšehrad Cemetery, Prague
- Occupation: Pedagogue
- Known for: Founder of the Czechoslovak Scouting organisation Junák

Antonín Benjamin Svojsík (5 September 1876 – 17 September 1938) was a Czech pedagogue and pioneer of Scouting. He introduced Scouting into Czechoslovakia and founded the Czechoslovak Scouting organisation Junák.

== Early life and education ==
Antonín František Svojsík was born on 5 September 1876 in Prague. His father was a gendarme and later a court clerk. He had three brothers. Shortly after Antonín's birth, the family moved to Dvůr Králové nad Labem, but after his father's death, the family returned to Prague. Svojsík played sports from a young age, was a member of the Sokol movement and was musically gifted. He studied teaching and from 1901 to 1914 he was a physical education teacher at the gymnasium in Prague-Žižkov. He was a member of the music department of the Umělecká beseda forum. He was a co-founder of the Czech Singing Quartet (Czech: České pěvecké kvarteto), which had a successful world tour in 1902. Here, as the youngest member, he earned the nickname "Benjamin", which he began to use as part of his name. From 1914 until his death, Svojsík lived in New Town district of Prague.

== Founding of Junák and later life ==
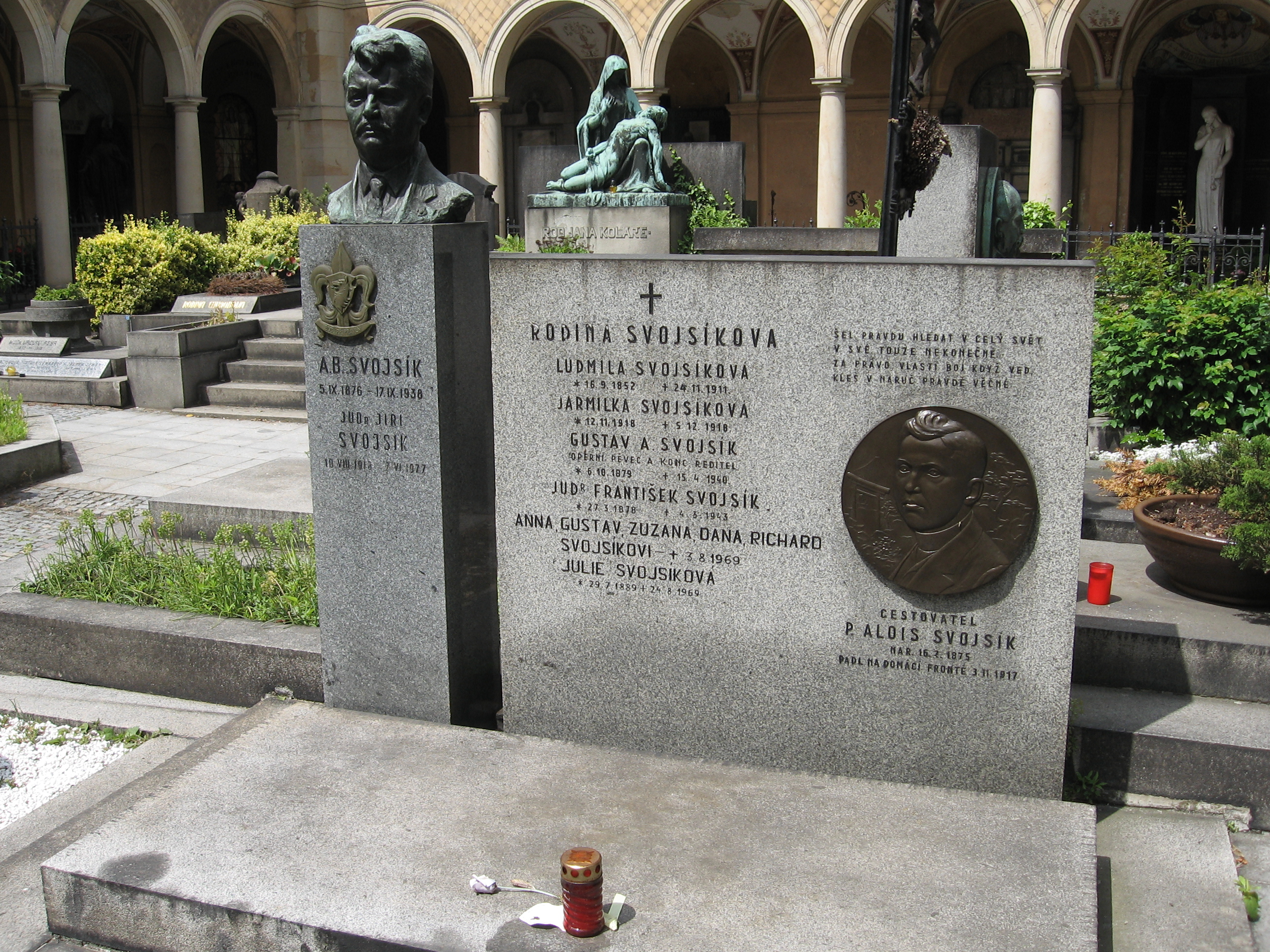
Svojsík's grave with his bust

In 1909 and 1911, Svojsík visited England, where he was introduced to scouting and visited a scout camp there. He received permission from Robert Baden-Powell to publish his book Scouting for Boys in Czech. After returning from England, he founded the first scout troop and began to devote himself fully to promoting scouting ideas and the art of woodcraft. To adapt scouting to the Czech environment, he invented the Czech name for it – Junák (junák = 'sturdy young man' in old Czech). Through his activities, he united some disorganised attempts to establish a Scouting organisation in the Czech lands. In 1912, he published the book Základy junáctví ("The Basics of Being junák"), to which Alois Jirásek, Karel Václav Rais and other prominent Czech personalities also contributed. In the same year, he organised the first scout camp near Lipnice nad Sázavou.

Svojsík wanted Junák to be part of the Sokol movement, but that did not work out. In 1914, the scouting association was officially founded under the name Junák – český skaut ("Junák – Czech Scouting") and Svojsík became its first chief scout. From 1915, he published the Junák magazine. He was a member on the World Scout Committee of the World Organization of the Scout Movement, and President of the Union of Slavic Boy and Girl Scouts. He also was a docent of Scouting at Charles University in Prague.

In the summer of 1938, Svojsík visited the Soviet Union to see how youth work was done there, but he did not like it and compared the Soviet Scouts to the Nazi German Hitler Youth. He returned from the trip tired and exhausted from the heat, and his body was attacked by a streptococcal infection. Svojsík died on 17 September 1938 in Prague. He had a large funeral, attended by 3,000 scouts. He is buried at the Vyšehrad Cemetery.

== Literary work ==
Svojsík has written several educational books on the topics of scouting, woodcraft and behaviour in nature, including:

- Základy junáctví (The Basics of Being junák; 1912)
- V přírodě (In Nature; 1912)
- Den v táboře junáků (A Day at the junáks' Camp; 1912)
- Umění pozorovati (The Art of Observation; 1912)
- Táboření (Camping; 1912)

== Honours and legacy ==
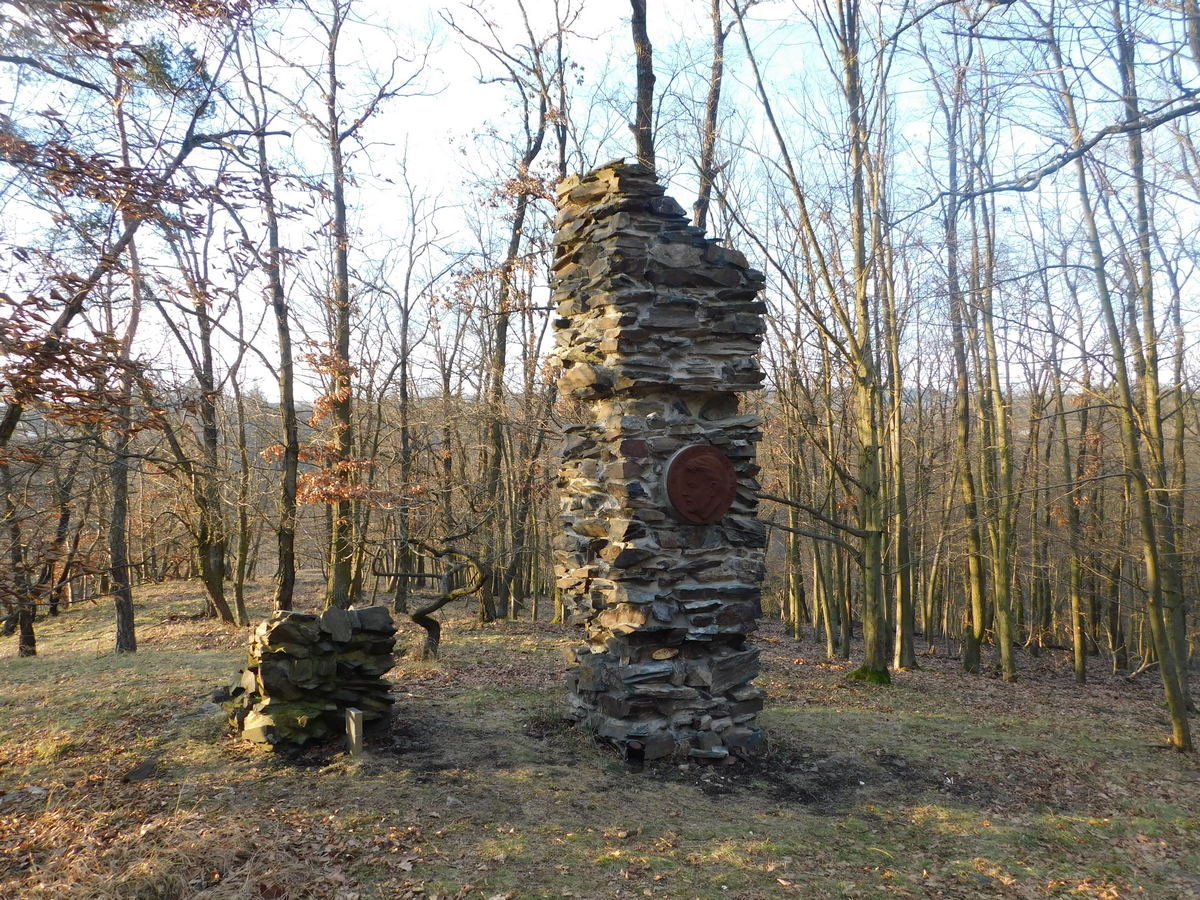
Antonín Benjamin Svojsík Mound

A memorial plaque is placed on the house where Svojsík lived from 1914 to 1937.

The Junák – Czech Scouting organisation organises the Svojsík Race competition every two years. It was founded in 1946. In the competition, children compare their abilities, skills and knowledge in a wide range of disciplines.

Svojsík's Troop is the name of an honorary unit of Junák, established in 1968.

Several cities and towns in the Czech Republic have a street named after Antonín Benjamin Svojsík, including Prague (Břevnov), Ostrava, Liberec, Ústí nad Labem and Kladno.

The tourist route to the Hostibejk hill near Kralupy nad Vltavou is called Svojsík's Route in honour of Svojsík.

Antonín Benjamin Svojsík Mound is located in the woods near Štěchovice (but in the territory of Slapy), on a hill above the Kocába River. It is a memorial with a bronze portrait of Svojsík. It was unveiled in 1946, but was destroyed in the 1950s. In 2008, a new mound was erected on the original site.
