= Rudolf Plajner =

Czech Scouting pioneer and teacher

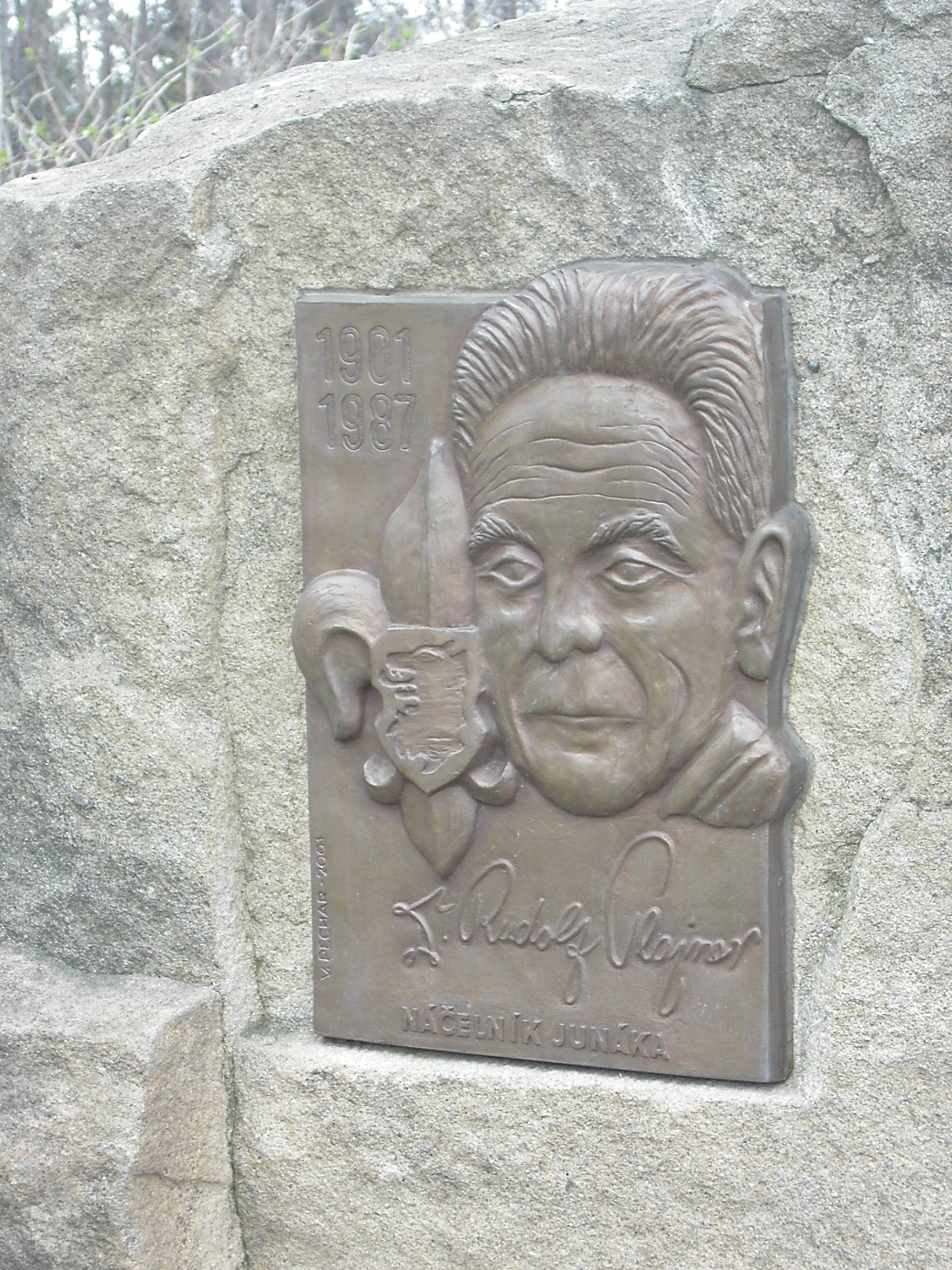
- Memorial of Rudolf Plajner on Hostýn
- Born: 5 April 1901; Prostějov, Moravia
- Died: 23 June 1987 (aged 86)
- Education: Charles University
- Occupations: School teacher, Scout leader, writer, resistance organizer

Rudolf Plajner (5 April 1901 – 23 June 1987) was a Czech Scouting pioneer and teacher, He was declared the Chief Scout of the newly unified Czech Scouts and Guides association called Junák after its inception on 22 January 1939. Junák was abolished by force and Scouting prohibited by German State Secretary Karl Hermann Frank during the Nazi occupation of Czechoslovakia on 28 October 1940. After World War II, the association was reborn. His function was confirmed at the third Junák council (Czech: sněm) in 1968, and served in this function until the end of his life.

== Background ==
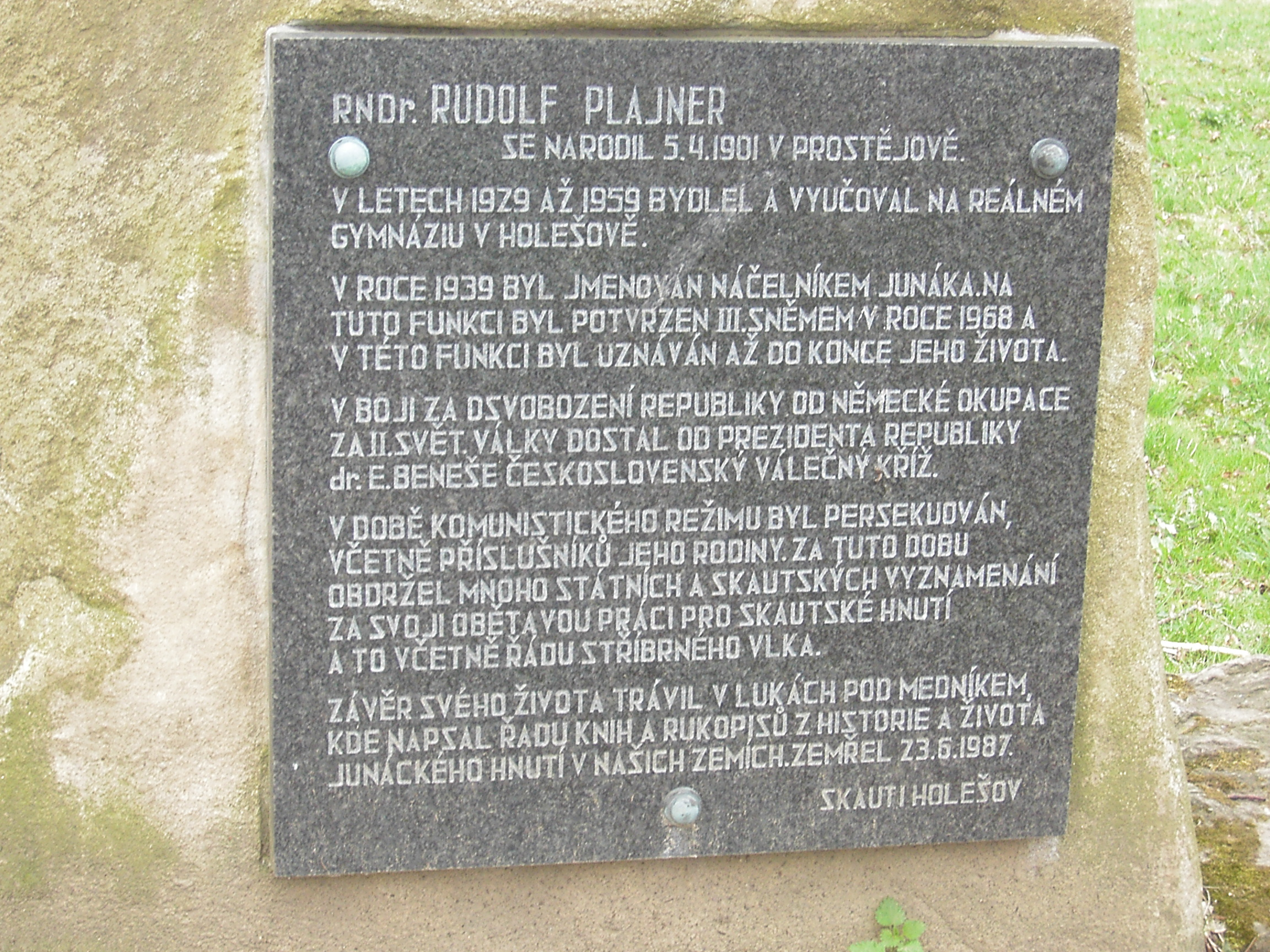
Plaque at Planjer's memorial on Hostýn

Plajner was born on 5 April 1901 in Prostějov, Moravia, Austria-Hungary. He earned the RNDr. title (the Czech doctorate in natural sciences), specializing in math and physics at Charles University in Prague. Between 1929 and 1959, he lived and taught at the real school in Holešov.

Plajner took part in building Defense of the Nation (cs:Obrana národa) and in other resistance organizations. He was arrested in 1943, and released after two months. He again joined the Czech resistance to Nazi occupation and cooperated with guerrilla brigade "Jan Žižka". For fighting to liberate Czechoslovakia from German occupation during World War II, he received the Czechoslovak War Cross (Československý válečný kříž) from president Edvard Beneš.

After the war Plajner received several honors and Junák started to work again in 1945, but in 1948 was included in the Socialist Youth Union (cs:Socialistický svaz mládeže, SSM), the Czechoslovak Communist youth organisation, and dissolved in 1950. Plajner was arrested and imprisoned shortly in 1949 in Uherské Hradiště. Junák shortly renewed its existence between 1968 and 1970 after the Prague Spring.

In the communist period he and members of his family were persecuted. Later in this period he received several state and Scout awards due to his work for the Scouting movement, including the Silver Wolf.

Plajner spent the end of his life in Luka pod Medníkem (now part of Jílové u Prahy), where he wrote a series of books and writings about the history and Scout life of the Junák movement. He published mostly on Scouting topics, and is the author of the Scout handbook Přiručka pro Junáky, Junácké hry pro školy a oddíly (Junák games for schools and troops), Radosti junáckého roku (Joys of the Scout year) and Úsvit českého junáctví (Sunrise of Czech Scouting).
