= Tramping music =

Music genre

Tramping music (Czech: trampská hudba) and tramping song (Czech: trampská píseň, trampská písnička) are the styles of music and songs associated with Czech tramping recreational activity. The sound combines the instrumentation of American country music with Czech language and culture. Czech folk songs are a primary influence on the genre. In particular, Czech bluegrass music is a significant component of the tramping style.

The style originated in the early 1900s, right after World War I, together with the tramping movement. While originally intended for singing on trail and by camp fire, concerts of tramp songs are popular both in various music venues and in private gatherings "off nature".

The CD series Nejhezčí české trampské písničky ("The Best Czech Tramping Songs") provides a selection of classic and popular songs in this style.

== Notable authors ==
- The unofficial "tramping anthem" of the old times is the song Vlajka ("The Flag", full title: Vlajka vzhůru letí, "The Flag Flies High") by Jenda Korda.
- The modern "tramping anthem" is Rosa na kolejích ("Dew on the Tracks") by Wabi Daněk.
- Vojta Kiďák Tomáško (born 1947), Czech siger-songwriter
- Brontosauři

== See also ==
- Tourist song in Soviet Union, Russia and some other post-Soviet states.
