= Brontosauři =

Czech folk band

- Origin: Jílové u Prahy, Czechoslovakia
- Genres: Folk; tramping
- Years active: 1972–1994
- Past members: Jan Nedvěd; František Nedvěd

Brontosauři was a Czech folk and tramping group founded in 1972 by brothers Jan and František Nedvěd. It was the successor of the band Toronto, based in the town of Jílové u Prahy. Thanks to the expressive creativity of the Nedvěd brothers, the band quickly became very popular, especially after the Porta Music Festival. Later, more musicians, each of whom were also members of the more popular band Spirituál kvintet, joined the brothers. Today, Brontosauři is a folk music legend in the Czech Republic. The band broke up in 1994 after the release of their last album, Zahrádky.

== Band members ==
- Jan Nedvěd – vocals, guitar
- František Nedvěd – vocals, guitar
- Jiří Bartoň
- Alexander Bezega
- Gustav Blažek – banjo
- Jitka Marková
- Luboš Schuss
- Zdena Tosková (later known as Zdena Tichotová) – vocals
- Petr Zadina – double bass
- Dušan Vančura – double bass

Timeline

== Discography ==
Studio albums

- Na kameni kámen (1986)
- Ptáčata (1987}
- Sedmikráska (1992)
- Zahrádky (1994)

Compilations

- Hlídej lásku, skálo má (2001)
