= Sedlec (Prague-East District) =

- Municipality
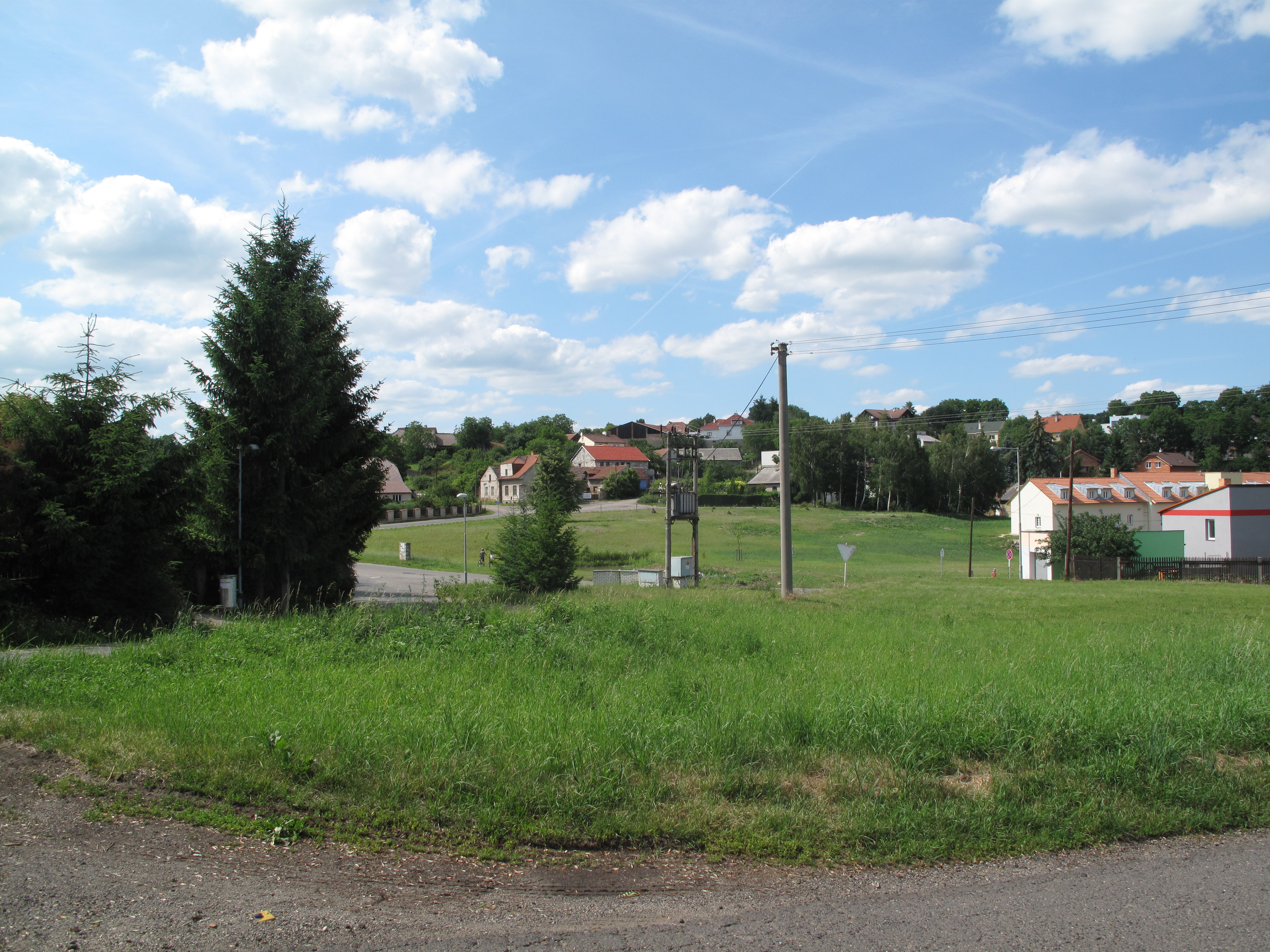
- General view

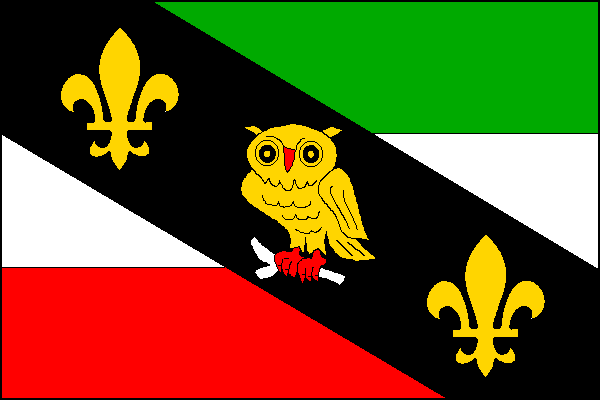
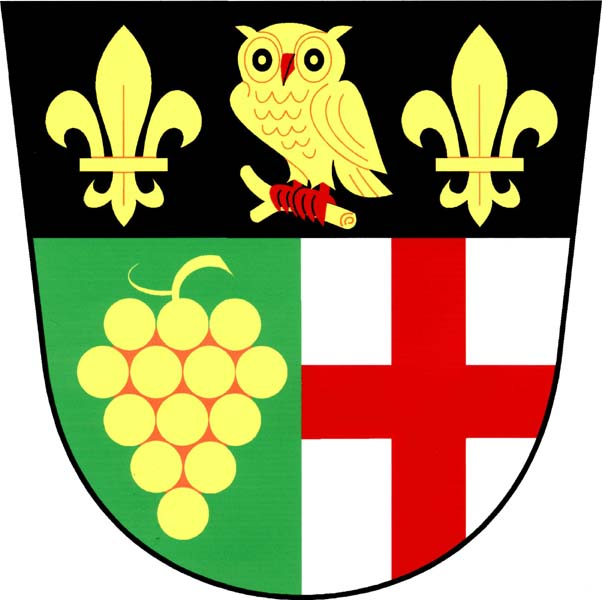
- Flag Coat of arms

- Location in the Czech Republic
- Coordinates: 50°11′13″N 14°27′29″E
- Country: Czech Republic
- Region: Central Bohemian
- District: Prague-East
- First mentioned: 1273

Area
  - Total: 1.88 km^{2} (0.73 sq mi)
- Elevation: 279 m (915 ft)

Population (2026-01-01)
  - Total: 534
  - Density: 284/km^{2} (736/sq mi)
- Time zone: UTC+1 (CET)
  - Summer (DST): UTC+2 (CEST)
- Postal code: 250 65
- Website: www.sedlec-pha.cz

Sedlec is a municipality and village in Prague-East District in the Central Bohemian Region of the Czech Republic. It has about 500 inhabitants.

== History ==
The first written mention of Sedlec is from 1273.

== Demographics ==
Historical population
Year	Pop.	±%
1869	135	—
1880	196	+45.2%
1890	158	−19.4%
1900	196	+24.1%
1910	198	+1.0%
1921	189	−4.5%
1930	175	−7.4%
1950	115	−34.3%
1961	161	+40.0%
1970	135	−16.1%
1980	160	+18.5%
1991	169	+5.6%
2001	177	+4.7%
2011	282	+59.3%
2021	482	+70.9%
Source: Censuses

== Notable people ==
- Vlasta Koseová (1895–1973), activist and scouting pioneer
