= Lysá hora =

Mountain in the Czech Republic

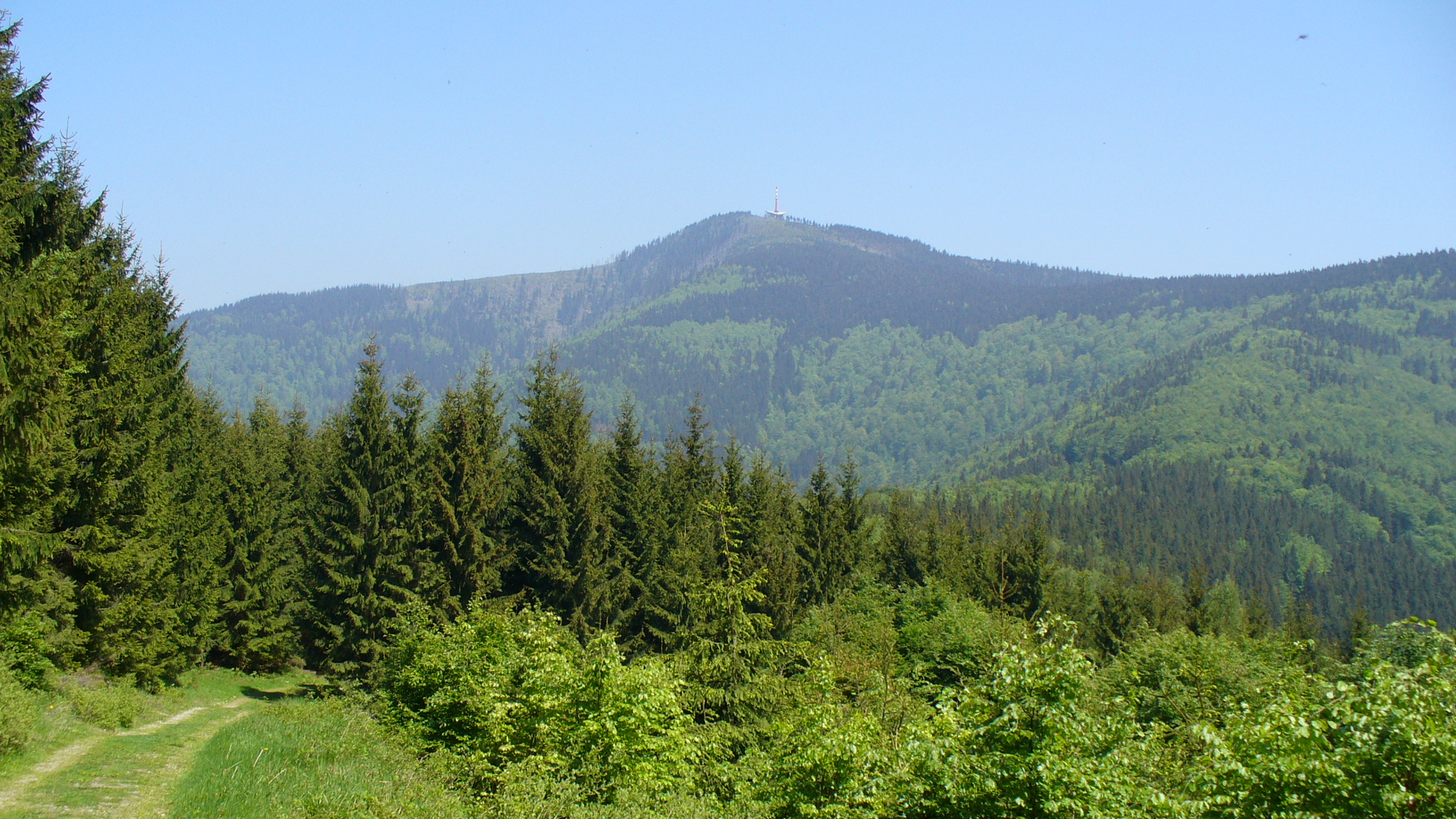

Highest point
- Elevation: 1,323 m (4,341 ft)
- Prominence: 768 m (2,520 ft)
- Isolation: 54 km (34 mi)
- Coordinates: 49°32′45″N 18°26′51″E

Geography
- Location within Czech Republic
- Location: Krásná, Moravian-Silesian Region, Czech Republic
- Parent range: Moravian-Silesian Beskids

Geology
- Mountain type: Godulian Sandstone

Climbing
- Easiest route: paved road

Lysá hora (Czech pronunciation: [ˈlɪsaː ˈɦora]; Polish: Łysa Góra; German: Lysa-berg, Kahlberg; Silesian: Gigula) is the highest mountain of the Moravian-Silesian Beskids range in the Czech Republic and also of the historical region of Cieszyn Silesia. It is one of the rainiest places of the country with an annual precipitation of over 1,500 mm (60 in). It is the 26th highest mountain in the country.

== Etymology ==
The name means 'bald mountain'; the name came from the fact that Lysá hora had no trees. The place was first mentioned in a written document from 1261 as Lissa huera.

== Climate ==
Lysá hora's climate is classified as subarctic climate (Köppen Dfc; Trewartha: Eolo). Among them, the annual average temperature is 3.7 °C (38.7 °F), the hottest month in July is 13.2 °C (55.8 °F), and the coldest month is −5.1 °C (22.8 °F) in January. The annual precipitation is 1,459.3 millimetres (57.45 in), of which July is the wettest with 199.9 millimetres (7.87 in), while February is the driest with only 88.1 millimetres (3.47 in), it is one of the few areas in the Czech Republic where the average annual precipitation exceeds 1,000 millimetres (39.37 in). The average annual snowfall reaches 473.1 centimetres (186.3 in), of which the average monthly snowfall from December to March of the following year reaches 80 centimetres (31 in). The extreme temperature throughout the year ranged from −30.9 °C (−23.6 °F) on 9 February 1956 to 29.5 °C (85.1 °F) on 8 August 2013.

Climate data for Lysá hora (altitude 1322m, 1991−2020 normals, extremes 1898–present)
Month	Jan	Feb	Mar	Apr	May	Jun	Jul	Aug	Sep	Oct	Nov	Dec	Year
Record high °C (°F)	14.5 (58.1)	12.7 (54.9)	16.1 (61.0)	22.8 (73.0)	26.3 (79.3)	27.6 (81.7)	29.4 (84.9)	29.5 (85.1)	26.9 (80.4)	21.4 (70.5)	14.8 (58.6)	12.0 (53.6)	29.5 (85.1)
Mean daily maximum °C (°F)	−2.6 (27.3)	−2.2 (28.0)	0.9 (33.6)	7.1 (44.8)	12.5 (54.5)	15.9 (60.6)	17.9 (64.2)	17.9 (64.2)	12.4 (54.3)	7.3 (45.1)	2.2 (36.0)	−1.6 (29.1)	7.3 (45.1)
Daily mean °C (°F)	−5.1 (22.8)	−5.0 (23.0)	−2.3 (27.9)	3.0 (37.4)	7.7 (45.9)	11.2 (52.2)	13.2 (55.8)	13.2 (55.8)	8.5 (47.3)	4.1 (39.4)	−0.3 (31.5)	−4.0 (24.8)	3.7 (38.7)
Mean daily minimum °C (°F)	−7.4 (18.7)	−7.3 (18.9)	−4.8 (23.4)	0.1 (32.2)	4.5 (40.1)	8.0 (46.4)	10.0 (50.0)	10.2 (50.4)	5.9 (42.6)	1.8 (35.2)	−2.3 (27.9)	−6.2 (20.8)	1.0 (33.8)
Record low °C (°F)	−30.1 (−22.2)	−30.9 (−23.6)	−22.8 (−9.0)	−14.4 (6.1)	−10.9 (12.4)	−3.2 (26.2)	0.3 (32.5)	−0.2 (31.6)	−5.6 (21.9)	−13.0 (8.6)	−18.0 (−0.4)	−25.3 (−13.5)	−30.9 (−23.6)
Average precipitation mm (inches)	88.6 (3.49)	88.1 (3.47)	95.5 (3.76)	96.2 (3.79)	148.5 (5.85)	163.0 (6.42)	199.9 (7.87)	139.4 (5.49)	146.6 (5.77)	102.7 (4.04)	93.1 (3.67)	97.7 (3.85)	1,459.3 (57.45)
Average snowfall cm (inches)	85.6 (33.7)	89.7 (35.3)	82.4 (32.4)	46.6 (18.3)	7.8 (3.1)	0.0 (0.0)	0.0 (0.0)	0.0 (0.0)	0.9 (0.4)	20.7 (8.1)	54.6 (21.5)	84.9 (33.4)	473.1 (186.3)
Average precipitation days (≥ 1.0 mm)	13.4	12.7	13.3	10.6	13.6	13.4	13.6	11.0	11.0	11.1	11.6	13.6	148.9
Average relative humidity (%)	87.3	87.3	85.8	77.8	78.8	80.6	78.5	77.8	84.7	87.1	90.0	87.7	83.6
Mean monthly sunshine hours	67.0	70.3	109.0	164.4	180.6	181.0	203.1	207.4	142.2	103.9	64.7	62.3	1,555.7
Source 1: Czech Hydrometeorological Institute (CHMI) (extremes, sunshine and humidity 1991-2020)
Source 2: NOAA

== Tourism ==
Today, the mountain is also a small ski resort and a popular place for hiking in summer, attracting casual hikers, and fans of Nordic walking, running, cross-country skiing, and alpine skiing. It is one of the most visited places in the Beskids. In 2018, roughly 750,000 tourists reached the peak. The area has also hosted various sports competitions.

It is the site of the Ivančena stone mound erected as a memorial for the eight Scouts, members of the Silesian Scout Resistance, executed in April 1945 in Cieszyn, modern-day Poland, for their part in anti-Nazi resistance. Each year on Saint George's Day, Czech Scouts make a pilgrimage to the site.

== Gallery ==
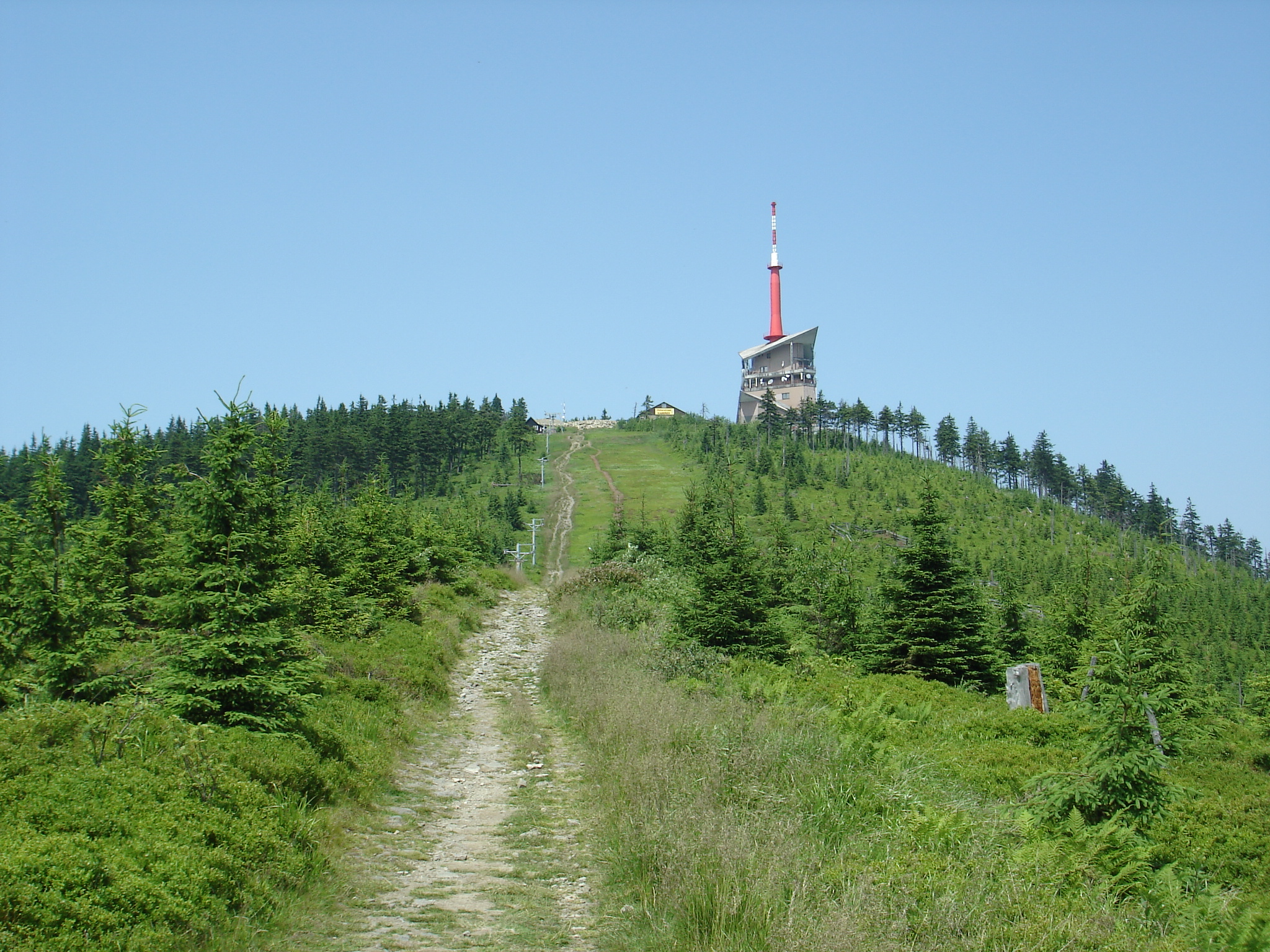
In summer

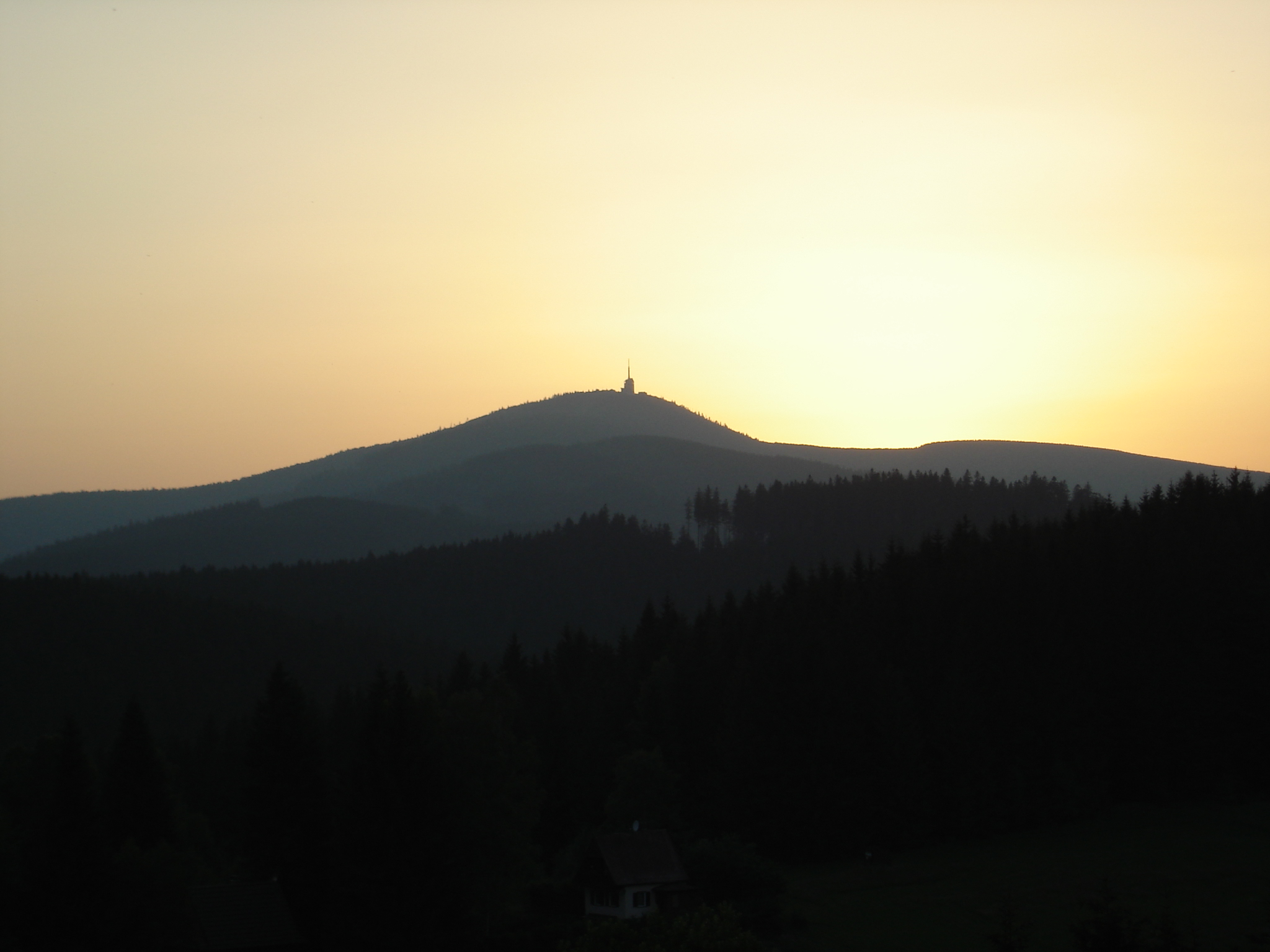
Sunset

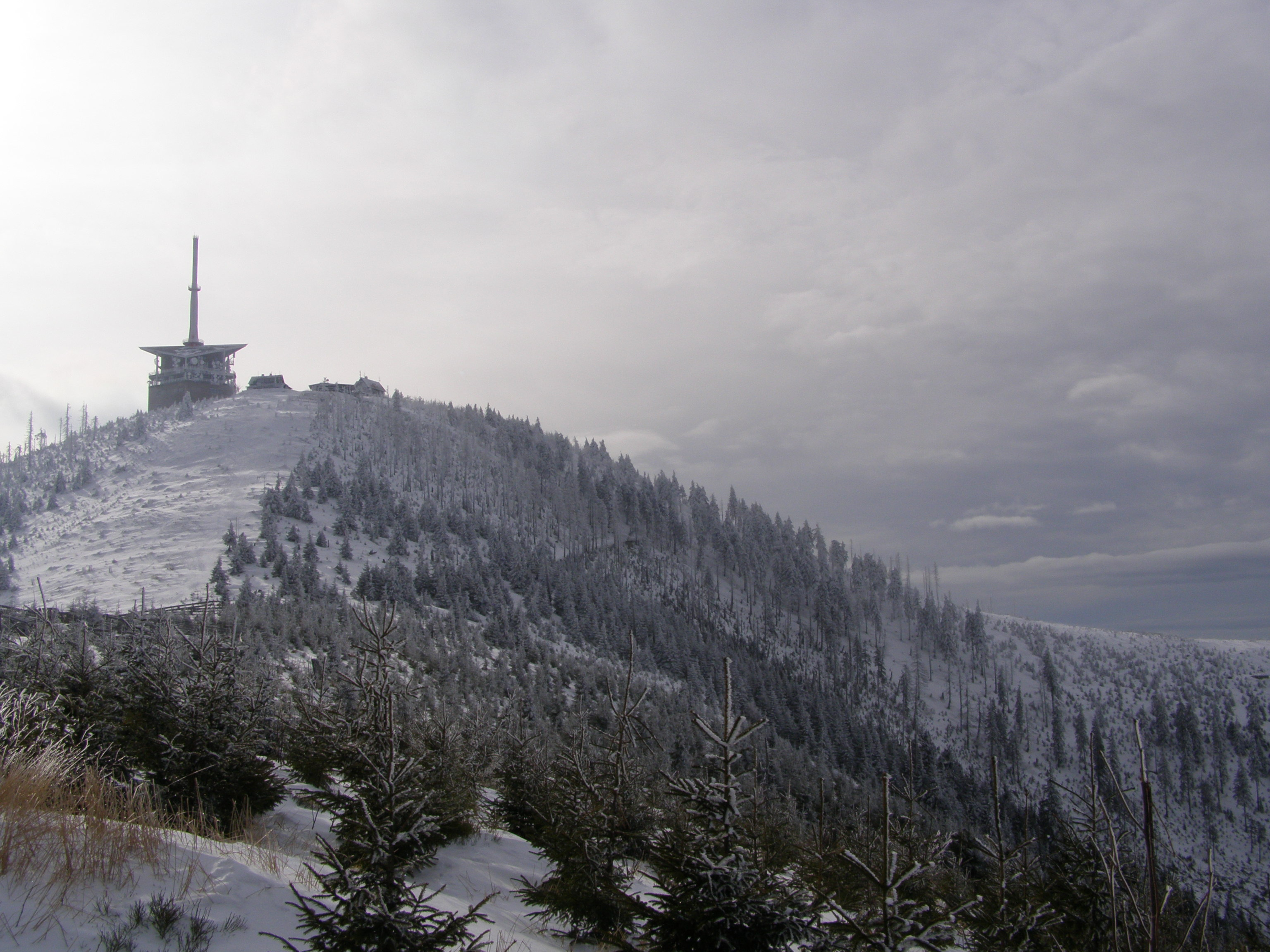
In winter

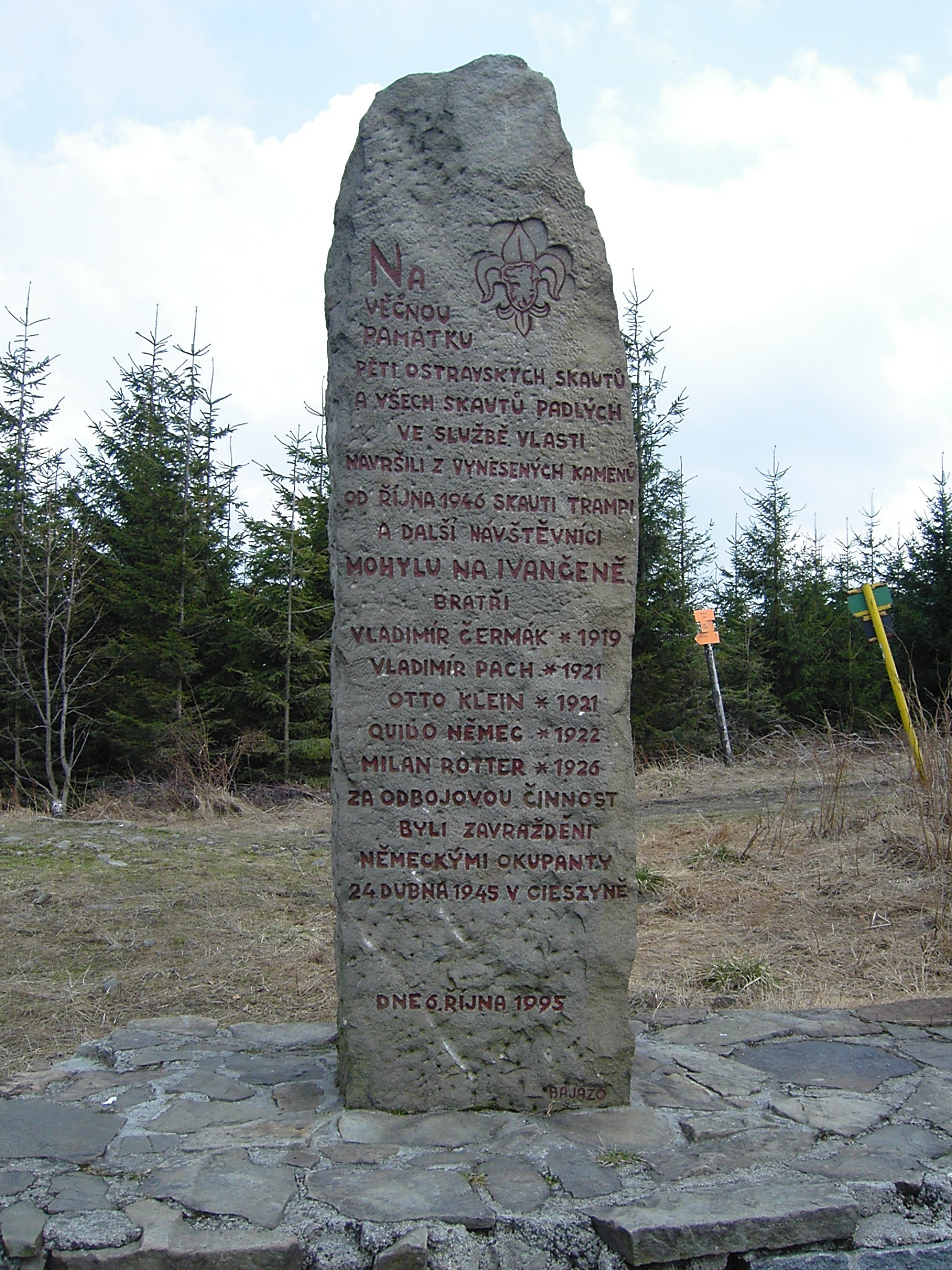
Ivančena memorial
