= Čeněk Klika =

Czech medical doctor and Scouting official

First Chairman of Junák

Personal details
- Born: 20 January 1865 Prague, Bohemia, Austrian Empire
- Died: 6 October 1938 (aged 73) Prague, Czechoslovakia

Čeněk Klika (20 January 1865 – 6 October 1938) was a Czech medical doctor and Scouting official. He served as the first chairman of the Czechoslovak Scouting organization Junák, formed in 1914 when in Bohemia was a part of Austria-Hungary.
