= Czech tramping =

Outdoor recreation movement

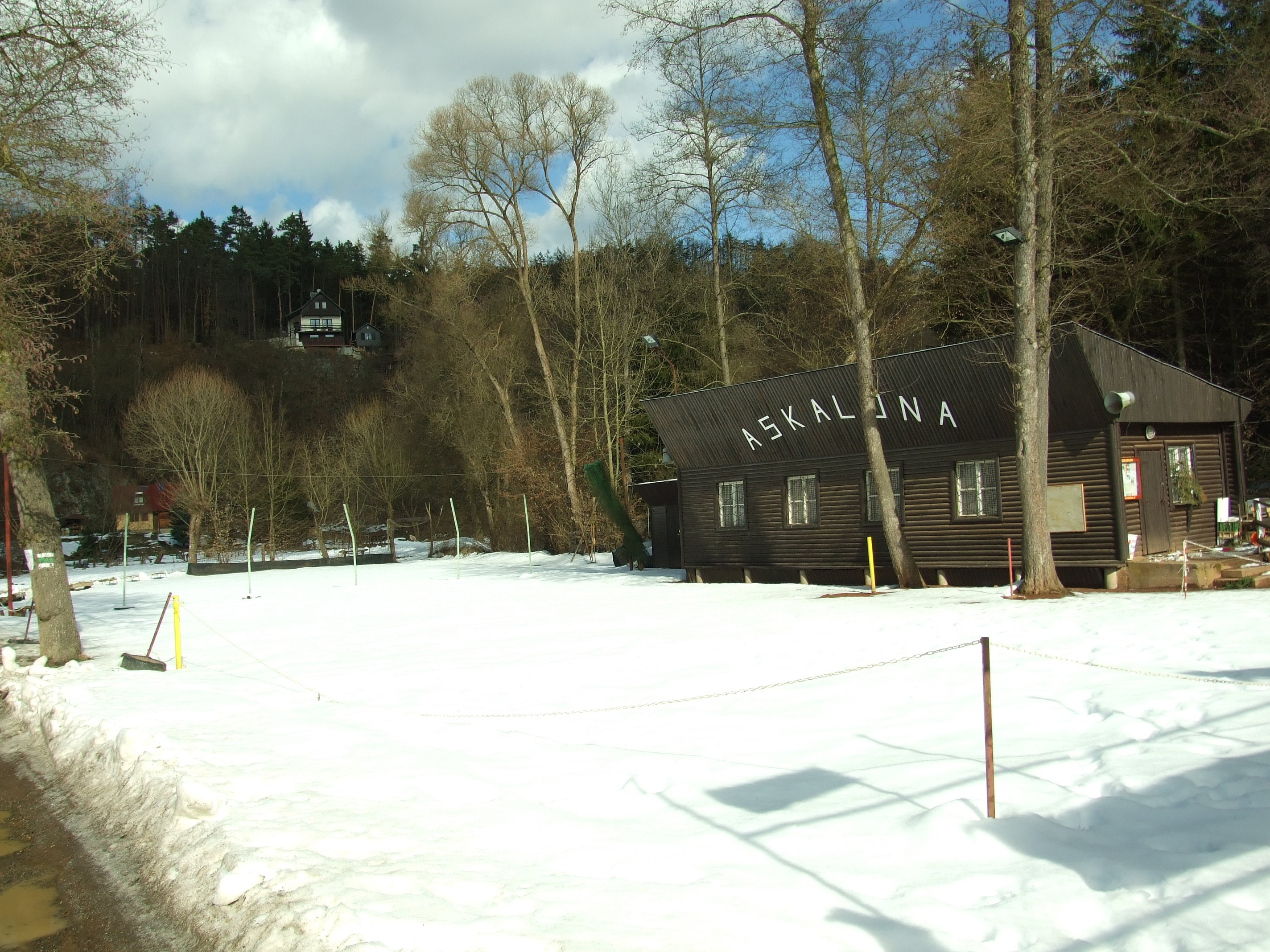
Tramp settlement Askalona next to the Kocába River in the territory of Bratřínov

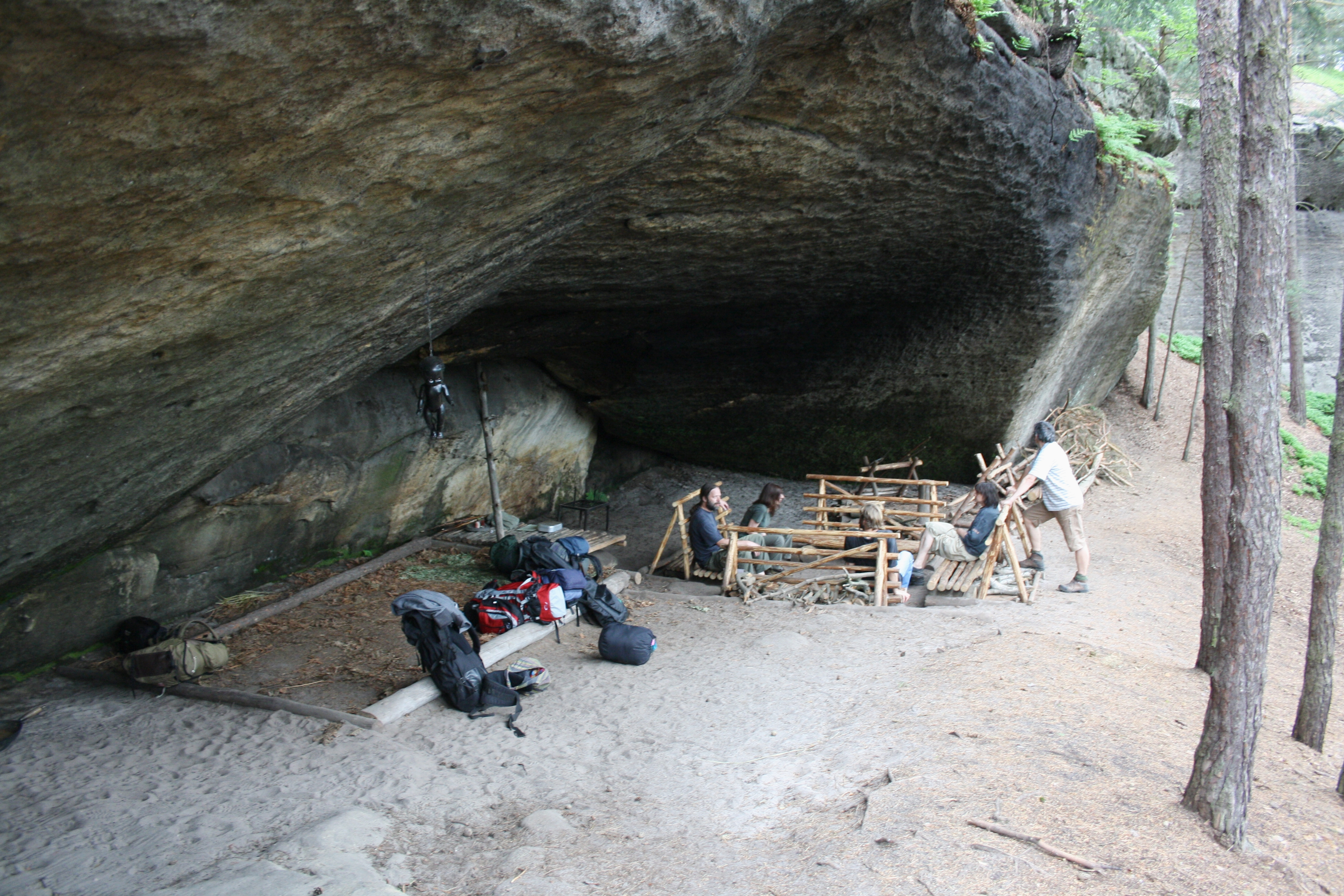
A provisional camp of Czech tramps "Mrtvé dítě" (Dead Kid) in the Roverky region (about 2005–2010)

Tramping (in Czech and Slovak language) is a movement in the Czech Republic and Slovakia that incorporates woodcraft, hiking/backpacking/camping and scouting, styled on the culture of the United States, especially the Wild West. Tramping is also associated with a distinctive style of clothing, hiking culture, slang, and music known as tramping music.

== History ==
Czech interest in the culture of the United States was strong after the founding of Czechoslovakia in October 1918, which was supported by President Woodrow Wilson. Charlotte Garrigue, wife of Czech president Tomáš Masaryk, was an American citizen. Westerns were very popular in the country. In the 1880s, outdoor sports became popular in Czech society. World War I led to an increase in the desire for personal freedom and to be outdoors.

The origin of Czech tramping is linked to the tramp settlement Lost Hope near Svatojánské proudy on the Vltava River in 1918. Czech tramping was influenced by the scouting movement. Having been an original Czech movement, tramping became popular in Slovakia in 1925-1928.

Tramping became even more popular during the Great Depression, when many people sought entertainment on a low budget.

While tramping was generally apolitical, there was a strong leftwing, or even pro-communist faction in tramping; some people who dressed themselves in the style of the "Soviet Union", using Red Army equipment and Communist badges.

In 1931, provincial president Hugo Kubát introduced a decree known as "Kubát’s Law", which forbade unmarried couples from camping together or swimming in many places, as well as singing "indecent" songs. In 1935, the Supreme Court ruled the decree to be unconstitutional, after which tramping became even more popular.

Tramping gained importance during World War II, when the Nazis made forays into the woods illegal, though many people found them culturally and socially important. American musical expressions such as those that had enlivened interwar tramps' campfire gatherings became more politically potent as well as more uniquely Czech.

After the 1948 Czechoslovak coup d'état, several tramping organizations were dissolved by the communists. Much of the clothing used in tramping became rare due to supply chain issues.

By the 1960s, as liberalization intensified, culminating in the Prague Spring in January 1968 and leading to the Warsaw Pact invasion of Czechoslovakia in August 1968, tramping was more homogenous; it was no longer predominantly for the lower classes. Under the rule of the communists, Czech tramping music was considered less objectionable than rock and roll and jazz and therefore it was more tolerated.

After the Velvet Revolution and the fall of communism, interest in tramping waned as international travel became easier, capitalism resulted in less free time and a wider variety of recreational activities, and scouting became more popular. Tramping has since become more relevant for its nostalgia.

== Legality ==
Camping and making bonfires in many areas in the Czech Republic is illegal and as a result, tramping is illegal in many areas.

== See also ==
- Ivančena
