= Václav Zapletal =

Czech footballer

Personal information
- Date of birth: 30 August 1985 (age 41)
- Place of birth: Czechoslovakia
- Height: 1.79 m (5 ft 10 in)
- Position: Midfielder

Senior career*
Years	Team	Apps	(Gls)
2003–2008	FC Tescoma Zlín	75	(3)
2007	→ SFC Opava (loan)		
2008–2013	SFC Opava		

International career
2000	Czech Republic U15	2	(0)
2001	Czech Republic U17	2	(0)
2003	Czech Republic U18	2	(0)
2004–2005	Czech Republic U21	2	(0)
- * Club domestic league appearances and goals

Václav Zapletal (born 30 August 1985) is a retired professional Czech football player who played in the Czech First League for FC Tescoma Zlín.
