= Velen Fanderlik =

Velen Fanderlik (11 February 1907, Prague – 2 February 1985, Trail) was a Czech educator and scout. He was the chairman of the Czechoslovak Scouting organization Junák, and later served on the World Scout Committee of the World Organization of the Scout Movement from 1947 until 1951.

Velen left Czechoslovakia after the communists took over the country.
