= Bill Klika =

Biographical details
- Born: June 28, 1945 (age 81)

Coaching career (HC unless noted)

Football
- 1974–1996: Fairleigh Dickinson–Florham
- 2000–2001: Fairleigh Dickinson–Florham

Baseball
- 1985: Fairleigh Dickinson–Florham
- 1987: Fairleigh Dickinson–Florham

Head coaching record
- Overall: 66–155–1 (football); 23–32 (baseball)

William Klika Jr. (born June 28, 1945) is an American former football and baseball coach and college athletics administrator. He was the first head football coach at Fairleigh Dickinson University–Florham (FDU) in Florham Park, New Jersey. An NCAA Division III program, FDU began its football program in 1974 and hired then 27-year-old Klika as its first coach. Klika remained in charge of the program from 1974 through 1996, took a three-year hiatus to serve as FDU's full-time athletic director, and then returned for two final seasons in 2000 and 2001. He compiled an overall record of 66–155–1.

== Head coaching record ==
=== Football ===
Year	Team	Overall	Conference	Standing	Bowl/playoffs
Fairleigh Dickinson–Florham Devils (NCAA Division III independent) (1974–1978)
1974	Fairleigh Dickinson–Florham	0–5			
1975	Fairleigh Dickinson–Florham	1–6			
1976	Fairleigh Dickinson–Florham	1–6			
1977	Fairleigh Dickinson–Florham	4–5			
1978	Fairleigh Dickinson–Florham	1–8			
Fairleigh Dickinson–Florham Devils (Middle Atlantic Conference) (1979–1982)
1979	Fairleigh Dickinson–Florham	0–10	0–7	8th (Northern)	
1980	Fairleigh Dickinson–Florham	1–8	0–7	8th (Northern)	
1981	Fairleigh Dickinson–Florham	1–8	1–6	7th (Northern)	
1982	Fairleigh Dickinson–Florham	1–8	0–7	8th (Northern)	
Fairleigh Dickinson–Florham Devils (NCAA Division III independent) (1983–1992)
1983	Fairleigh Dickinson–Florham	1–8			
1984	Fairleigh Dickinson–Florham	4–5			
1985	Fairleigh Dickinson–Florham	5–4			
1986	Fairleigh Dickinson–Florham	4–5			
1987	Fairleigh Dickinson–Florham	5–4			
1988	Fairleigh Dickinson–Florham	6–2			
1989	Fairleigh Dickinson–Florham	4–4–1			
1990	Fairleigh Dickinson–Florham	0–9			
1991	Fairleigh Dickinson–Florham	2–7			
1992	Fairleigh Dickinson–Florham	4–5			
Fairleigh Dickinson–Florham Devils (Middle Atlantic Conference) (1993–1996)
1993	Fairleigh Dickinson–Florham	8–3	4–1	2nd (Freedom)	L ECAC Southwest
1994	Fairleigh Dickinson–Florham	5–4	2–2	T–2nd (Freedom)	
1995	Fairleigh Dickinson–Florham	4–5	2–2	3rd (Freedom)	
1996	Fairleigh Dickinson–Florham	2–8	1–3	T–3rd (Freedom)	
Fairleigh Dickinson–Florham Devils (Middle Atlantic Conference) (2000–2001)
2000	Fairleigh Dickinson–Florham	1–9	0–4	5th (Freedom)	
2001	Fairleigh Dickinson–Florham	1–9	1–7	10th	
Fairleigh Dickinson–Florham:		66–155–1	11–46		
Total:		66–155–1			
