= Scouting and Guiding in the Czech Republic =

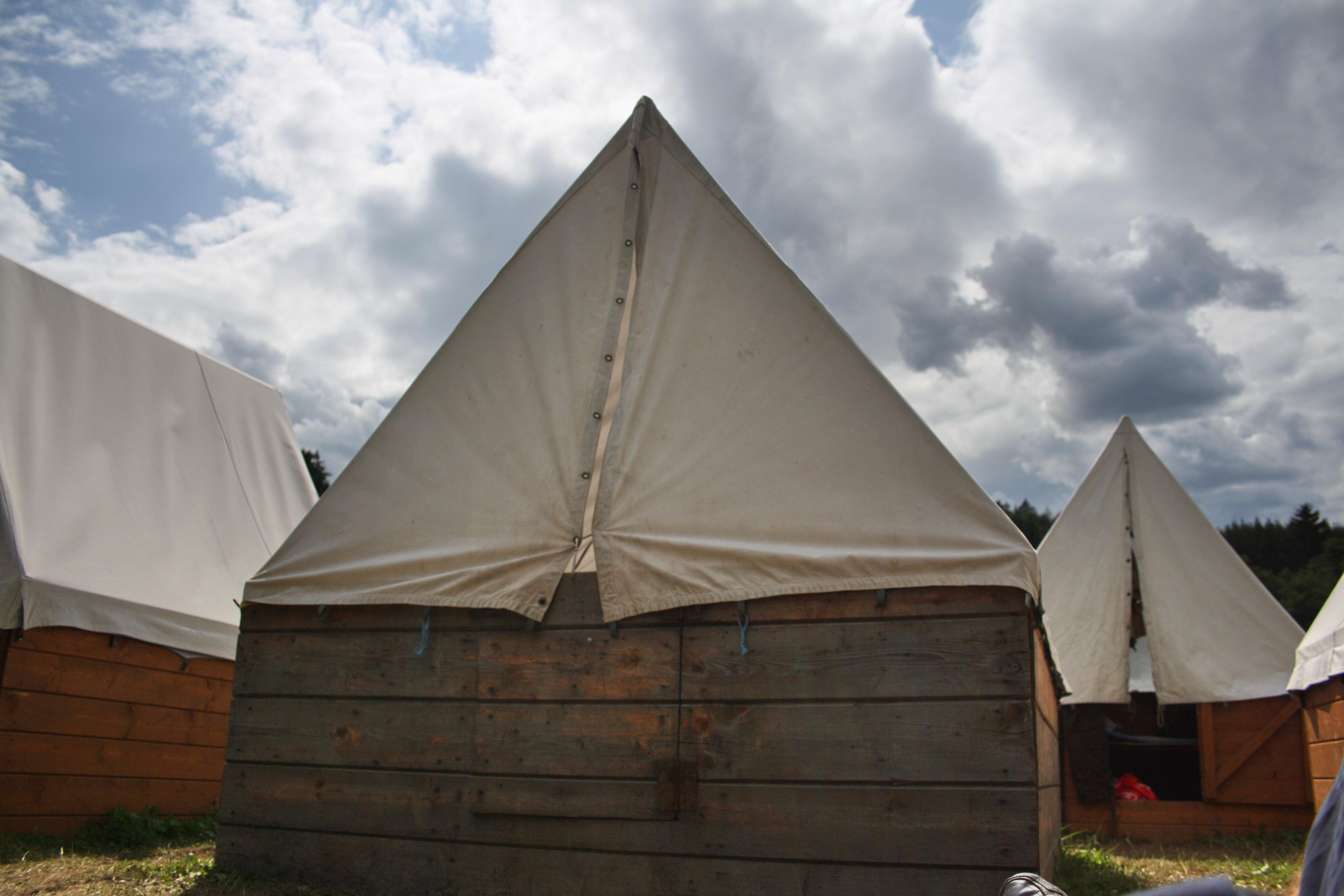
Tents at a Czech scout camp in 2009.

The Scout and Guide movement in the Czech Republic is served by

- Junák - Czech Scouting, member of the World Organization of the Scout Movement, of the World Association of Girl Guides and Girl Scouts and of the International Scout and Guide Fellowship, with its 78 137 members the largest educational movement for children and young people in the country.
- Asociace Skautek a Skautů Evropy (ASSE), belonging to the Union Internationale des Guides et Scouts d'Europe.
- Skaut-Český Scouting ABS (member of WFIS).
- Svaz Skautů a Skautek České Republiky (member of WFIS).
- YMCA-Skaut (nonaligned to a supranational organization).
- Klub Pathfinder, affiliated to Pathfinders International.
- Serving the Czech community outside of the country is a combined Scouts-in-Exile organization, Czech and Slovak Scouts Abroad.

== Czech Scouting in exile ==
Emblem of Czech and Slovak Scouts Abroad, which incorporates the Flag of Czechoslovakia, the Trefoil as a symbol for Girl Guides, the traditional badges of Junák and Slovenský skauting

The Czechoslovak government-in-exile officially restored Junák and Czech and Slovak Scout groups were founded in exile, especially in the North of England and the South of Scotland, Rover Crews were founded in the Czechoslovak Armed Units in the United Kingdom and elsewhere.

In 1948 Scouting was banned again in Czechoslovakia. Czech and Slovak refugees founded again Czech and Slovak Scout groups in exile. Junák-in-Exile was formed as a National Scout Organisation-in-Exile for Czechoslovak Scouting. From 1948 to 1950 they were members of the Displaced Persons Scout Division of the Boy Scouts International Bureau.

After the end of Prague Spring in 1968 thousands of refugees left their homeland and many Scouts were among them. So the existing Junák units in many countries were enlarged and new Scout groups were founded in many countries.The Czech and Slovak Scouts-in-Exile in Switzerland founded in cooperation with the Scouts of Switzerland new Junák units. Junák was also active in countries such as Austria, Germany, Luxembourg and the Netherlands.

After the Rebirth of Scouting in Czechoslovakia the Exile movement were disbanded and its members became members of Junák or of the N.S.O.s of their countries of residence.

The Emblem shown on the left is the badge of Czech and Slovak Scouting Abroad, before 1989 this Emblem was in use with the text: Czech and Slovak Scouting Exile.

== International Scouting units in the Czech Republic ==
Polish Scouting

Harcerstwo Polskie w Republice Czeskiej (Polish Scouting in The Czech Republic - a Polish émigré Scout group).

US Scouting

There are USA Girl Scouts Overseas in Prague, serviced by way of USAGSO headquarters in New York City; as well as In addition, there are American Cub Scouts and Boy Scouts, linked to the Horizon District of the Transatlantic Council of the Boy Scouts of America, which supports units in west-and-central Europe, the Near East and North Africa.

British Scouting Overseas - 1st Prague (Czech Republic) Scout Group

In May 2014, British Scouting Overseas established a Scout Group in Prague, 1st Prague (Czech Republic) Scout Group. The group is an English-speaking international Scout Group, it provides Scouting to young people from many nationalities in Prague the capital city of The Czech Republic. In January 2024 it had 180 youth members. Sections in the group are Squirrels (4 to 6 years) on Wednesdays, Beavers Scouts (6 to 8 years) on Thursdays, Cub Scouts (8 to 10.5 years) on Tuesdays and Thursdays, Scouts (10.5 to 14 years) on Tuesdays and Wednesdays and Explorer Scouts (14 to 18 years) on Mondays. Its scarf colours are yellow, red, white and blue (the Prague flag, Czech Flag and UK Flag Colours). In 2024 the group moved to a new Scout centre in the centre of Prague The Gilwell Centre where all of its sections now meet.
