= Junák =

Czech Scouting organization

Junák – český skaut
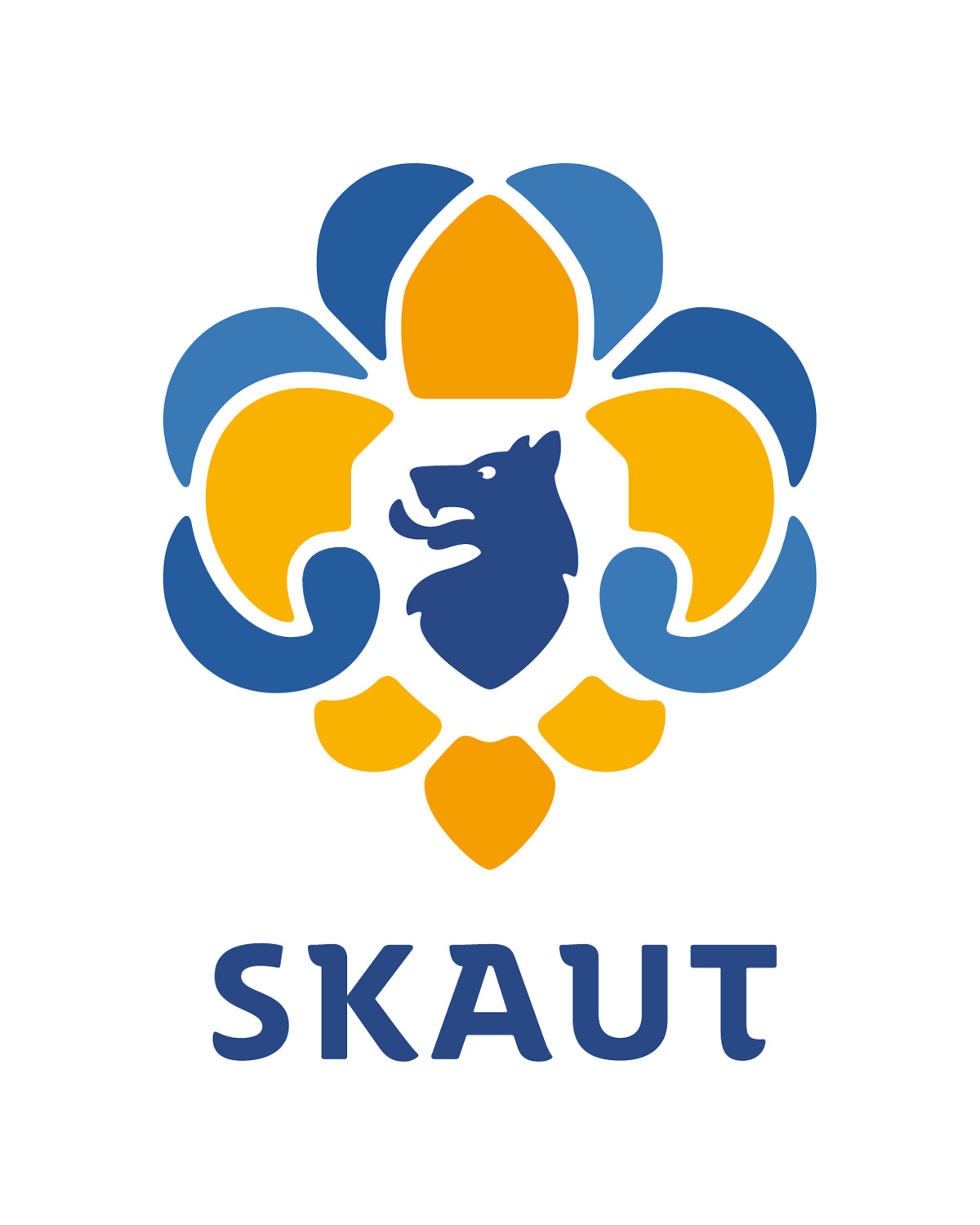
- Junák – Czech Scouting
- Country: Czech Republic
- Founded: 1911
- Founder: A. B. Svojsík
- Membership: 78,137
- Chief Scout: Ondřej Vokál
- Chief Guide: Vendula Bušková
- President: Josef Výprachtický
- Affiliation: World Organization of the Scout Movement, World Association of Girl Guides and Girl Scouts
- Website skaut.cz

Junák – český skaut (Junák – Czech Scouting), is the internationally recognized organization of Scouts and Guides of the Czech Republic. Founded in 1911, Junák – český skaut is the largest organisation of children and youth in the nation, with a membership of 78,137 (as of 2025).

== History ==
A voluntary, non-political civic organization, without restriction to membership, Junák was founded in 1911 by Antonín Benjamin Svojsík, who, after visiting British Scouts, wanted to establish a similar movement in his homeland. In 1910, inspired by the writings of Baden-Powell, Svojsík wrote Základy junáctví ("The Foundations of Scouting"), the first handbook for Scouts already operating in the Czech lands. In that book, he combined Baden-Powell's system of education; ideas of the American writer, traveller and painter Ernest Thompson Seton (founder of Woodcraft); and the traditions of the Czech nation. He followed this with an experimental camp in 1912. The participants walked the entire 200 km distance on foot, and their luggage was brought there on a single large push-cart. In the quickly developing world of Scouting at the time, Junák-Český skaut provided a model to be followed by many other developing national associations.

Scouting in the Czech Republic has a long and distinguished history. The independent organization Junák was established in June 1914, the same year its first Scouting newsletter was issued; the chairman was Čeněk Klika and Svojsík was the Chief Scout. A month later World War I started and many leaders were called up to fight. In January 1915, the first Girl Scouts were introduced, under the leadership of Vlasta Koseová, and shortly thereafter, a section for Guide Education was established. Anna Berkovcová became the Chief Guide. The same summer, the first Girl Guide company "Anemones" held a camp on the banks of river Vltava.

In 1918, at the creation of the Czechoslovak Republic, the Czech Scouts offered their services, and helped the established government with many things, they kept patrol over important buildings and sites, but they are best known for their mail delivery service, delivering official mail in Prague. They had their own stamps, the first Scout stamps in the world, which are very rare and valuable today among stamp-collectors. On 21 December 1918, "Czech Scout mail" was restored, due to the arrival of President Masaryk from exile. The ranks of Scouting grew rapidly in the new country, and in 1922 a National Scout festival took place in Prague to commemorate 10 years of Scouting. Following the end of World War I, the different associations within Czechoslovakia came together in one united national association, and the Czechoslovak Scout and Guide Federation was among the charter members of the World Organization of the Scout Movement in 1922, with Svojsík elected to the World Committee.

Before World War II, Junák had the third most members of any Scout Association in Europe, and numbered seventh in the world; by 1936 the number of Scouts in Czechoslovakia was 70,000. Junák bid to host the World Jamboree in 1933. The preparations started in earnest and in 1931 Czech Scouts prepared the "All-Slavonic Jamboree" as the test for the World Jamboree, a successful festival which culminated in a march through Prague and an address by President Masaryk at Prague castle. But in the end the World Jamboree was to take place in Hungary. Czech Scouts participated in all World Jamborees from the first in 1920 through 1937. At the 1937 World Jamboree in the Netherlands, the Junák contingent had 314 members.

Antonín Benjamin Svojsík died on 17 September 1938. Czech Scouts and Guides unified on 22 January 1939 to found the new association called Junák. The Chief Scout was Rudolf Plajner and the Chief Guide was Vlasta Koseová. Junák was abolished by force and Scouting prohibited by German State Secretary Karl Hermann Frank during the Nazi occupation of Czechoslovakia on 28 October 1940. Many Scouts and Guides joined the Czech Resistance; over 700 of them died during the war as part of the movement. After the war, the association was re-registered in Prague in 1945, following the country's liberation, with 120,000 members registered in 1946, the number of members grew to nearly 250,000, (making it the second largest association in the World Movements at that time), and in 1947, a contingent of 500 represented Junák at the World Scout Jamboree in France, sporting two Scout bands. In summer 1946, Lady Olave Baden-Powell visited Czechoslovakia and she was welcomes in the whole country by Scouts and Guides. After the war, in lieu of Scout camps, their participants helped in local agriculture. Chief Guide Vlasta Koseová became the Vice-chairman of the World Committee of WAGGGS and Chairman Velen Fanderlik was a member of the World Scout Committee of WOSM.

However, in 1948, after the Communist coup, Junák was disbanded; beginning in 1949, trials were held against various Junák Commissioners, some of whom were sentenced to many years of imprisonment in communist concentration camps, where many of them died. Many Junák troops continued to meet in secret. In 1968, during the Prague Spring, Scouts and Guides again began meeting openly, until Junák was banned by order of the Federal Ministry of the Interior, in October 1970. During that period, the number of Scouts in Czechoslovakia was 65,000. Again, many Junák units continued to operate in secret.

After the 1989 Velvet Revolution, Junák was one of the first organisations to re-emerge from working underground, by then, for the fourth time in its history. By the close of 1989, the number of Scouts in Czechoslovakia was 80,000. On 1 February 1990, the Federation of Czech and Slovak Scouting was officially registered, paving the way for its re-admittance to the World Organization during the World Scout Conference in Paris in July 1990, re-recognised by the major world Scouting organisations (see below). Upon Czechoslovakia's dissolution on 31 December 1992, Český Junák (as it was then called) and Slovenský skauting were required to apply for membership of the World Organization as the national member organizations of the Czech Republic and the Slovak Republic, respectively. On June 30, 1996, Junák – svaz skautů a skautek ČR was welcomed as the 141st member of the World Organization of the Scout Movement. In 1998, Junák became one of the founding members of the Czech Council of Children and Youth, a national youth council that aims to protect the rights and interests of Czech young people. Membership in 2019 was 64,383 Scouts and Guides in the Czech Republic. During the summer of 2018, 1,039 camps were held. In 2001, Junák hosted the European Guide and Scout Conference, in Prague.

== Organisation and structure ==
Czech Scouts within Junák are members of the World Organization of the Scout Movement (WOSM), the Guides are members of the World Association of Girl Guides and Girl Scouts (WAGGGS), and the Adult Scouts and Guides of the International Scout and Guide Fellowship (ISGF).

The "Adult Scout and Guide Guild", also known as "Czech Scout and Guide Fellowship", changed their name in 2007 from "The Old Scout Guild" into "The Adult Scout and Guide Guild".

The association has a total membership of some 64,000 operating in a country with a population of around 10.5 million people. Junák is a "Scout and Guide National Organization" in accordance with the Statement on Relationships between WAGGGS and WOSM.

The organisational body of Junák is divided into 14 regions and below 80 districts, overseen by the National Assembly (14 elected, 17 appointed by regions and internal bodies), led by the Chief Scout and Chief Guide, who, in turn, appoint the president and the members of the executive committee of Junák.

Communications between the districts and regions, and to Junák headquarters, includes monthly information packages sent to all groups, mostly by e-mail.

== Events ==
The Scouts and Guides in Junák organise many events on the national and local level. One of them is the Svojsík's Race, which takes place every two years. Junák hosted Intercamp in 1994, 2004 and 2016, and the Czech Rover Moot Obrok (event), every two years and the Water Scouts hold a national water-themed jamboree, Navigamus, every three years. Junák also organises monetary drives and information campaigns, e.g. in support of cancer research and development projects in Ethiopia. Every Christmas, Czech Scouts and Guides distribute the Bethlehem Light around the country.

Junák publishes four magazines, for its various divisions, as well as various other materials, numbering roughly 15–20 different publications a year. The organisation also maintains Scout/Guide centres around the country, run by their respective districts and groups. Some of these are open to the public, for a nominal fee, as self-service accommodation.

During the communist era, Scouts, trampers, and other hikers, would trek to Ivančena. These hikes were monitored by the state security. Pilgrimages to the mound continue to this day. Each year on a Saturday near Saint George's Day (April 24), Czech Scouts make a pilgrimage to the site. Since 1996, when a plaque commemorating the "Resistance of the Silesian Heroes" was placed at the Jewish cemetery in Cieszyn, Poland, a commemorative event has also been held at this place as part of the pilgrimage. The mound is still growing and is made of stones originating from around the world.

== Program ==
The program is as follows:

- Benjamínci/Benjamins – ages 5 to 7
- Vlčata and Světlušky/Cubs and Fireflies – ages 8 to 10
- Skauti and Skautky/Scouts and Guides – ages 11 to 14
- Roveři/Rovers and Rangers – ages 15 to 26

As Native American symbology and mythology has been popular in Central Europe since the 1880s, the most known merit badge in Czech Scouting is the Three Feathers of Eagle, highest one is Lion Scout. Highest award in Czech Scouting is The Order of silver trefoil for women or The Order of the Silver Wolf for men.

=== Scout and Guide ideals and symbology ===
Czech scout badge

The Scout Motto (Skautské heslo) is Buď připraven, translating as Be Prepared in Czech. The Czech noun for a single Scout is Skaut.

The painter Mikoláš Aleš created the Czech Scout emblem-the symbol is the Scout lily, with the head of a Bohemian Shepherd (a legendary symbol of faithfulness and freedom, the historical symbol of Czech frontiersmen), placed on the trefoil. The musician Karel Kovařovic composed the Czech Scout anthem.

== See also ==
- Edvard Beneš
- Jaroslav Foglar, propagator of Scouting in Czechoslovakia
- Jan Kubiš
- Silesian Scout Resistance
- Dagmar Skálová
- Prokeš Coup
