= List of Czech cover versions of songs =

This is a list of songs that have a cover version in Czech:

== English ==
Original title	Original artist	Original date	Cover title	Cover artist	Cover lyricist	Cover date	Note
(Everything I Do) I Do It For You	Bryan Adams	1991	Srdce prodávám	Petr Poláček	Aleš Brichta	2005	
(Everything I Do) I Do It For You	Bryan Adams	1991	Konec dětských snů	Leona Machálková	Ivan Hlas	1999	
(Ghost) Riders In The Sky	Johnny Cash	1948	Starý honec krav (Ďáblovo stádo)	Waldemar Matuška, Rudolf Cortéz, Wabi Daněk	Jiří Brdečka	1981, 2002, 2012	
50 Ways To Leave Your Lover	Paul Simon	1975	Dvěstě cest, jak sbohem dávat	Pavel Bobek	Michael Žantovský	1977	
9 To 5	Dolly Parton	1980	Mám chuť psát	Jitka Zelenková	Zdeněk Rytíř	1981	
A Dear John Letter	Ferlin Husky & Jean Shepard	1953	Drahý můj	Naďa Urbánková & Jiří Grossmann / Jiří Grossmann & Miloslav Šimek	Jiří Grossmann	1967 / 1970	
A Love So Beautiful	Roy Orbison	1988	Láska je nádhera	Karel Gott	Miloš Skalka	2013	
A Tree Too Weak To Stand	Gordon Lightfoot	1975	Jablůňka	František Nedvěd		1998	
A Tree Too Weak To Stand	Gordon Lightfoot	1975	Vánoční	Michal Tučný	Petr Novotný	1978	
A World of Our Own	The Seekers	1965	Škatule	Rangers – Plavci	Antonín Hájek	1970	
Action City	Kim Wilde	1982	Já tvé sny znám	Marie Rottrová	Zdeněk Mašta	1983	
Ain't No Grave	Claude Ely	1954	Chci být při tom	Spiritual kvintet	Dušan Vančura	1992	
All By Myself	Eric Carmen	1975	Kam tenkrát šel můj bratr Jan	Karel Gott	Zdeněk Borovec	1978	
All By Myself	Eric Carmen	1975	Zůstávám dál	Monika Absolonová	Monika Absolonová	2004	
All By Myself	Eric Carmen	1975	Zůstávám dál tak samotná	Marcela Holanová	Karel Šíp	1978	
All By Myself	Eric Carmen	1975	Už nikdy víc	Lucie Bílá	Gábina Osvaldová	2009	
All Grown Up	Gallagher and Lyle	1978	Přítel čas	Hana Zagorová	Jiřina Fikejzová	1979	
All Kinds Of Everything	Dana	1970	Zpívej a povídej	Alena Tichá	Pavel Cmíral	1970	
All Out of Love	Air Supply	1980	Nezapírám	Josef Vágner	Eduard Krečmar	2013	
Almost Paradise	Mike Reno & Ann Wilson	1984	Kluk z příštího století	Hana Zagorová & Stanislav Hložek	Zdeněk Borovec	1985	
Always Something There To Remind Me	Sandie Shaw	1963	Všechno už je pryč, už je ráno	Helena Vondráčková	Zdeněk Rytíř	1969	
An American Dream	Nitty Gritty Dirt Band	1979	Vůz jede dál	Jiří Korn	Miroslav Černý	1981	
Angels	Robbie Williams	1997	Anděl spásy	Josef Vágner	Eduard Krečmar	2010	
Ann	Glen Campbell	1964	Má dívka N	Pavel Bobek	Jiří Grossmann	1975	
Annie's Song	John Denver	1974	Když milenky pláčou	Karel Gott	Zdeněk Borovec	1982	
Another Brick In The Wall	Pink Floyd	1979	The Wall	Bacily, Václav Neckář, Bambini di Praga	Michael Prostějovský	1979	
Any Dream Will Do	popularized by Jason Donovan, Lee Mead	1968; 2007	Každý má svůj sen	Dušan Vitázek, Karel Gott	Michael Prostějovský	2006, 2007	
Arms of Mary	The Sutherland Brothers & Quiver	1976	Srdce	Radek Tomášek	Radek Tomášek	1977	
As Tears Go By	Marianne Faithfull; Rolling Stones	1964; 1965	Čekám dál	Judita Čeřovská	Aida Brumovská	1970	
As Tears Go By	Marianne Faithfull; Rolling Stones	1964; 1965	Pláč	Václav Neckář	Zdeněk Rytíř	1966	
Ave Maria	Beyoncé	2008	Ave Maria	Kamila Nývltová	Petra Cvrkalová	2013	
Ave Maria	Johann Sebastian Bach	1722	Ave Maria	Lucie Bílá	Pavel Vrba	1996	
Bad Connection	Yazoo	1980	Nikdo není doma	Heidi Janků	Tomáš Skácelík	1982	
Bad Moon Rising	Creedence Clearwater Revival	1969	Asi	Pavel Novák	Pavel Novák	1970	
Bang-A-Boomerang	ABBA	1975	Hrej, ať stromy roztančíš	Martha A Tena Elefteriadu & Bob Frídl	Oskar Man	1976	
Banks of the Ohio	traditional, popularized by Olivia Newton-John	1971	Náklaďák	Petra Černocká	Pavel Žák	1976	
Banks Of The Ohio	traditional, popularized by Olivia Newton-John	1971	Ohio	Kto, Taxmeni, Strangers; Jindřich Šťáhlavský	Jiří Šosvald	1971	
Beat on The Brat	Ramones	1976	Ať nám je líp	Parkán		1998	
Beautiful Noise	Neil Diamond	1976	Nádherný chór	Karel Gott	Zdeněk Borovec	1977	
Beautiful Sunday	Daniel Boone	1972	Gól	Jiří Hromádka	Pavel Žák	1972	
Beautiful Sunday	Daniel Boone	1972	Dala jsi lásku	Milan Drobný	Pavel Žák	1973	
Because The Night	Patti Smith, Bruce Springsteen	1978; 1986	Volá tě noc	Anna K	Lou Fanánek Hagen		
Because The Night	Patti Smith, Bruce Springsteen	1978; 1986	Hrej mi	Tana Hornofová & Metronom	Vladimír Poštulka	1972	
Beside You	Iggy Pop	1993	Konec Bulla Máchy	Tři sestry		1995	
Bette Davis Eyes	Kim Carnes	1981	Dívka, která spí jen tak	Marie Rottrová	Jaromír Nohavica	1982	
Big Yellow Taxi	Joni Mitchell	1970	Žlutý taxík	Zdenka Lorencová	Zdenka Lorencová herself	1975	
Bilitis (Theme from Bilitis)	instrumental by Francis Lai	1977	Ty mně smíš i lhát	Jitka Zelenková	Eduard Pergner	1971	
Blame It On The Boogie	The Jacksons	1978	Muž č. 1	Marie Rottrová	Jaromír Nohavica	1981	
Blowin' in the Wind	Peter, Paul & Mary	1963	Vítr to ví	Waldemar Matuška	Ivo Fischer	1968	
Blowin' In The Wind	Peter, Paul & Mary	1963	Jen vítr to ví a mlčí dál	Judita Čeřovská	Zdeněk Borovec	1965	
Blowin' In The Wind	Peter, Paul & Mary	1963	Jen vítr to ví	Bob Frídl	Oskar Man	1973	
Blue Eyes Crying In The Rain	Elton Britt, Willie Nelson	1946; 1975	Pláčou tvoje modré oči	Věra Martinová	Tony Linhart	1995	
Bonzo Goes To Bitburg	Ramones	1986	Expres do Bohnic	Tři sestry		2005	
Break My Mind	Crystal Gayle	1993	Mně se zdá	Petr Spálený & Miluška Voborníková	Petr Rada	1972	
Bridge Over Troubled Water	Simon & Garfunkel	1970	Most přes rozbouřené vody	Helena Vondráčková, Lucie Bílá	Pavel Vrba	1979	
Bridge Over Troubled Water	Simon & Garfunkel	1970	Most přes rozbouřené vody	Helena Vondráčková	Pavel Vrba	1979	
Bright Eyes	Art Garfunkel	1979	Johanka z Arcu	Jiří Korn	Zdeněk Borovec	1980	
Broken Lady	Larry Gatlin	1975	Léta pádí	Waldemar Matuška & KTO	Ivo Fischer	1982	
Broken Wings	Mr. Mister	1985	Babylon	Sámer Issa	Gabriela Osvaldová	2005	
Butt Naked	Aleena Gibson	2003	Nahá noc	Aneta Langerová	Milan Princ	2004	
Butterfly	Danyel Gérard	1971	Butterfly	Jakub Smolík, Jiří Sťědroň	Vladimír Poštulka	1999, 1972	
Butterfly	Danyel Gérard	1971	Butterfly	Yvetta Simonová	Zdeněk Borovec	1972	
Butterfly	Danyel Gérard	1971	Butterfly	Dušan Grúň	Dušan Grúň	1972	
By The Devil (I Was Tempted)	Blue Mink	1973	Nápad	Jitka Zelenková & Jana Kocianová	Miroslav Černý	1973	
Bye, Bye Love	The Everly Brothers	1957	Já znám lék	Martha & Tena Elefteriadu	Aleš Sigmund	1971	
C Moon	Wings	1971	S tebou	Marie Rottrová	Miroslav Černý	1973	
California über alles	Dead Kennedys	1978	Na Kovárně, to je nářez	Tři sestry		1991	
Call Me	Aretha Franklin	1970	Kdo má rád	Marie Rottrová	Jiřina Fikejzová	1981	
Call Me	Spagna	1987	Mám plán	Hana Zagorová	Michal Bukovič	1987	
Cambodia	Kim Wilde	1981	Ať život má svůj děj	Jiřina Urbanová	Václav Babula	1984	
Can I See You Tonight	Tanya Tucker	1980	Žárlím a nemám proč	Lenka Filipová	Zdeněk Rytíř	1982	
Candy	Iggy Pop	1990	Venda	Tři sestry		1999	
Cannibals	Mark Knopfler	1996	Flám	Schovanky	Jana Trčková	1997	
Canta libre	Neil Diamond	1972	Díky vzdávám	Petr Spálený	Pavel Vrba	1974	
Caramella	Rino Martinez	1981	Pojď blíž	Michal David	František Řebíček	1982	
Caribbean	Mitchell Torok	1953	Ve dvou se to lépe táhne	Karel Černoch & Jiří Wimmer	Eduard Krečmar	1986	
Carolina Mountain Dew	Alabama	1984	Karolína	Michal Tučný	Tučný himself	1986	
Carolina Mountain Dew	Alabama	1984	Tajná láska	Waldemar Matuška	Ivo Fischer	1985	
Carolina Mountain Dew	Alabama	1984	Jižní Čechy	Rangers – Plavci	Milan Dufek	1992	
Carolyn	Steve Wynn	1981	Temelín	Doctor P.P.	Petr Pečený	2004	
Centerfold	J.Geils Band	1981	Rock kolem roku	Petr Rezek	Pavel Žák	1983	
Chariot	Franck Pourcel et son Grand Orchestre, Petula Clark	1961; 1962	Malý vůz	Judita Čeřovská, Ilona Csáková	Jiřina Fikejzová	1964; 1995	
Chariots of Fire	Vangelis	1981	To jsou má vítězství	Jitka Zelenková	Boris Janíček	1983	
Cheri Cheri Lady	Modern Talking	1985	Sny o tygří lady	Arnošt Pátek	Jaroslav Machek		
Cherish	Kool & The Gang	1984	Cesta je stále stejná	Iveta Bartošová		1986	
Christmas Song	Chris Norman	2003	O Vánocích	Iveta Bartošová	Vladimír Kočandrle	2005	
Christmas Time	Bryan Adams	1985	Štěstí sněží nám	Jakub Smolík	Zbyněk Derner	2008	
Cinderella	Sweetbox	2001	Arabela	Gabriela Goldová	Zdeněk Rytíř	2004	
Cindy	Peter, Sue & Marc	1976	Cindy	Jiří Korn & Hana Buštíková	Mirek Černý	1979	
City To City	Gerry Rafferty	1978	Dětskej vlak	Petr Rezek	Pavel Žák	1981	
Close To You	The Carpenters	1963	Kouzelník	Miluška Voborníková	Vladimír Poštulka	1972	
Close To You	The Carpenters	1963	S tebou žít	Antonín Gondolán; Karel Gott	Eduard Krečmar	1972	
Co-Co	The Sweet	1971	Koko	Valérie Čižmárová	Vladimír Poštulka	1971	
Coconuts From Congoville	Soulful Dynamics	1965	Hádej mámo	Petra Černocká	Jiří Malý	1973	
Come Back To My Life	La Bionda & Zilla	2013	Zombie	Lucie Vondráčková	Hana Sorrosová		
Congratulations	Cliff Richard	1968	Jak se tak dívám	Václav Neckář	Ivo Fischer	1968	
Congratulations	Traveling Wilburys	1988	Jak ty to děláš	Petr Rezek & Karel Vágner	Zdeněk Borovec	2004	
Coward of the County	Kenny Rogers	1979	Drž se zpátky, chlapče můj	Pavel Bobek	Michael Janík	1981	
Coward Of The Country	Kenny Rogers	1979	Béčko z okresního města	Ivan Hovorka & Country Beat Jiřího Brabce	Michal Bukovič	1980	
Cracklin' Rosie	Neil Diamond	1970	Koráby snů	Junion	Pavel Cmíral		
Cracklin' Rosie	Neil Diamond	1970	Citronový háj	Jiří Helekal	Vladimír Poštulka	1972	
Crossfire	The Bellamy Brothers	1977	Srdce jako kámen	Karel Gott	Zdeněk Borovec	1977	
Crying	Roy Orbison; Don McLean	1961; 1978	Pláč	Karel Gott	Zdeněk Borovec	1981	
Crying in the Chapel	Darrell Glenn; Elvis Presley	1953; 1965	Cesta rájem	Karel Gott, Ilona Csáková, Jiří Korn	Jiří Štaidl	1965, 1993	
Daddy Cool	Boney M.	1976	Tak už jsem boty zul	Josef Laufer	Laufer himself	1977	
Daddy Cool	Boney M.	1976	Zrady kůl	Těžkej Pokondr		1977	
Daddy, Don't You Walk So Fast	Daniel Boone	1971	Táto, zůstaň aspoň do Vánoc	Karel Gott	Jiří Štaidl	1972	
Dancing In The City	Marshall Hain	1978	Tanečnice Kitty	Helena Vondráčková	Zdeněk Borovec	1980	
Daydream	The Lovin' Spoonful	1966	Mít čas pro trochu snění	Pavel Bobek	Michael Žantovský	1980	
Daydream	The Lovin' Spoonful	1966	Život vypadal krásně	Lucie Bílá	Gabriela Osvaldová	2009	
Dear Mrs. Applebee	David Garrick	1966	Mrs. Applebee	Václav Neckář	Pavel Vrba	1967	
Death of a Clown	Dave Davies	1967	Trápím se, trápím	Petr Spálený & Apollobeat	Petr Spálený	1970	
Delilah	Tom Jones	1968	Čas růží	Karel Gott	Rostislav Černý	1968	
Diggi Loo, Diggi Ley	Herrey's	1984	Digi Loo Digi Lay	Milan Křesina	Pavel Cmíral	1986	
Dirty Old Town	The Dubliners	1949	Zůstal jsem sám	Tři sestry		2010	
Disco Band	Scotch	1984	Tak to nejde	Viktor Sodoma	Jaromír Cenkl	1985	
Disco in Moscow	The Vibrators	1980	Whisky do mozku	Tři sestry		2000	
Do That to Me One More Time	Captain & Tennille	1979	Láska prý je snadná věc	Hana Zagorová	Zdeněk Borovec	2007	
Do to Me	Smokie	1979	Trápení	Stanislav Hložek & Petr Kotvald	Pavel Žák	1982	
Does Your Chewing Gum Lose Its Flavour?	Lonnie Donegan	1924	Svatební průvod	Naďa Urbánková	Jiří Grossmann	1972	
Don't Be Cruel	Elvis Presley	1956	Co je to láska	Eva Pilarová. Jana Robbová, Jiří Suchý	Jiří Suchý	1961	
Don't Bogart Me	Fraternity Of Man	1969	Pojď stoupat jak dým	Pavel Bobek	Vladimír Poštulka	1975	
Don't Cry Joni (Touch the Hand)	Conway Twitty & Joni Lee	1975	Víc než přítel	Karel Černoch & Filip Brabec	Jaroslav Machek	1986	
Don't Fall in Love with a Dreamer	Kenny Rogers & Kim Carnes	1980	S tím bláznem si nic nezačínej	Pavel Bobek & Marie Rottrová	Vladimír Poštulka	1986	
Don't Leave Me This Way	Harold Melvin & the Blue Notes, Thelma Houston	1975; 1976	Hrej mi	Marie Rottrová	Jaroslav Wykrent	1977	
Don't Pass Me By	Beatles	1968	Namále mám	Jiří Schelinger	Jiří Grossmann	1975	
Don't Pay The Ferryman	Chris de Burgh	1982	Převozník	Jiří Korn	Mirek Černý	1985	
Don't Play Your Rock 'n' Roll to Me	Smokie	1975	Zpíval jen rokenrol, nic víc	Radek Tomášek	Jan Krůta	1977	
Don't Stop	Fleetwood Mac	1967	Dnes plač	Marie Rottrová	Marie Rottrová	1986	
Donna	Ritchie Valens; Cliff Richard	1958; 1958	Dáňa	Pavel Noha	Pavel Žák	1986	
Donna Musica	Collage	1980	Dávná známá	Petr Rezek	Zbyšek Malý	1983	
Down by the river	Albert Hammond	1972	Já znám ten balzám	Hana Zagorová	Zdeněk Rytíř	1974	
Down Town	Petula Clark	1964	Pátá	Helena Vondráčková; Zuzana Norisová	Jiří Štaidl	1965; 2001	
Dracula's Tango	Toto Coelo	1982	Manekýnka	Pavel Roth	František Ringo Čech	1984	
Dream A Little Dream Of Me	Ernie Birchill; The Mamas and the Papas	1931; 1968	Hvězdy jako hvězdy	Lucie Bílá	Gábina Osvaldová		
Dream A Little Dream Of Me	Ernie Birchill, The Mamas and the Papas	1931; 1968	Tam pod nebeskou bání	Eva Olmerová; Jitka Zelenková	Aida Brumovská	1970; 2006	
Dreamin'	Cliff Richard	1980	Vím jen, že nosíš džíny	Zdeněk Mann	Petr Markov	1980	
Driving Home for Christmas	Chris Rea	1986	Na Vánoce k našim	Helena Vondráčková	Zdeněk Borovec	1995	
Early Morning Rain	Gordon Lightfoot	1966	Ranní déšť	Wabi Daněk	Wabi Daněk	1996	
Early Morning Rain	Gordon Lightfoot	1966	Dálnice č.5	Minnesengři, Pavel Žalman Lohonka		1977, 1993	
Early Morning Rain	Gordon Lightfoot	1966	Z nebe padá ranní déšť	Pavel Bobek	Vladimír Poštulka	1993	
Eldorado	Goombay Dance Band	1980	Eldorádo	Waldemar Matuška	Ivo Fischer	1982	
Eloise	Barry Ryan	1968	Eloise	Karel Gott	Eduard Krečmar	1969	
Elvira	The Oak Ridge Boys	1981	Mám páru	Michal Tučný	Zdeněk Rytíř	1983	
Elvira	The Oak Ridge Boys	1981	Tak málo	Naďa Urbánková & Karel Černoch			
EMI	Sex Pistols	1977	EMI	Tři sestry		1999	
Endless Love	Diana Ross & Lionel Richie	1981	Můj ideál	Karel Černoch & Jitka Zelenková, Karel Gott & Monika Absolonová	Eduard Krečmar	1986	
Everybody Join Hands	Giorgio Moroder	1971	Všichni budete zpívat	Jana Matysová	Vojtěch Dyk	1974	
Everybody Loves a Winner	Middle Of The Road	1976	Nakresli si s námi křížky	Jana Kratochvílová	Karel Šíp	1977	
Everybody's Rockin'	Bernie Paul	1979	Nápad	Hana Zagorová	Pavel Žák	1982	
Everybody's Talkin'	Harry Nilsson	1966	Modrá zem	Petr Rezek	Pavel Žák	1975	
Everything I Own	Bread	1972	Na konci tvého snu	Hana Buštíková	Vladimír Poštulka	1980	
Everything's Alright / I Don't Know How to Love Him	Yvonne Elliman	1970	Co na tom je tak zlého	Bára Basiková	Michael Prostějovský	1994	
Eye Of The Tiger	Survivor	1982	Na buben dát vlastní kůži	Petra Janů	Michal Horáček	1984	
Far from over	Frank Stallone	1983	Máme šanci	Jitka Zelenková	Eduard Pergner	1985	
Far, far away	Slade	1974	Dál, dál se ptej	Arakain & Aleš Brichta	Aleš Brichta	1995	
Far, far, away	Slade	1974	Dál plápolej	Karel Gott	František Ringo Čech	1979	
Flying Through The Air	Oliver Onions	1973	Raketou na Mars	Věra Špinarová	František Ringo Čech	1974	
Footloose	Kenny Loggins	1984	Dům hrůz	Stanislav Hložek & Petr Kotvald	Zdeněk Borovec	1985	
Footloose	Kenny Loggins	1984	V pravou chvíli řekni stop	Karel Gott	Eduard Pergner		
For Once In My Life	Stevie Wonder	1966	Já žil, jak jsem žil	Karel Gott, Karel Hála	Zdeněk Borovec	1989, 1972	
For The Good Times	Kris Kristofferson	1970	Ještě je čas	Michal Tučný & Greenhorns	Honza Vyčítal	1973	
For The Good Times	Kris Kristofferson	1970	Hodinám, které přijdou	Milan Chladil	Mirek Černý	1975	
For You Only	Alison Moyet	1984	Jsi ve znamení panny	Denisa Kubová	František Stralczynsky	1994	
For your eyes only	Sheena Easton	1981	Jsem stále stejná	Helena Vondráčková	Pavel Žák	1982	
Forever Young	Alphaville	1984	Být stále mlád	Karel Gott	Eduard Krečmar	2001	
Four Kinds Of Lonely	Lee Hazlewood	1965	Dáma při těle	Petr Spálený	Pavel Vrba	1970	
Freedom Come, Freedom Go	The Fortunes	1971	Ránem azurovým	Milan Drobný	Vladimír Poštulka	1972	
Freedom Come, Freedom Go	The Fortunes	1971	Žena sem, žena tam	Milan Chladil	Eduard Krečmar	1972	
Freedom Come, Freedom Go	The Fortunes	1971	Příjdu ḧned	Milan Černohouz	Radek Stanovský	1972	
From a Distance	Bette Midler	1985	Hymna bližních	Karel Gott	Karel Šíp	1992	
From a Distance	Bette Midler	1985	Z výšky nebes	Jitka Zelenková	Eduard Krečmar	2007	
From Me To You	Beatles	1963	Adresát neznámý	Karel Gott	Jiří Štaidl	1965	
Funny, Funny	The Sweet	1971	Sliby-chyby	Hana Zagorová	Zdeněk Rytíř	1972	
Funny, Funny	The Sweet	1971	Jak se máš, Hany	Pavel Novák	Pavel Novák	1971	
Games People Play	Joe South	1969	Podivný hry lidí	Petr Spálený	Vladimír Poštulka	1969	
Georgie	Pussycat	1976	Vzpomínám (Georgie)	Věra Špinarová	Mirek Černý	1977	
Gimme Dat Ding	The Pipkins	1970	Gimi det ding	Jiří Grossmann & Miluška Voborníková	František Ringo Čech	1970	
Ginny Come Lately	Brian Hyland	1962	Takový nejsi	Karel Zich & Jitka Zelenková	Michal Bukovič	1985	
Girls Just Want To Have Fun	Cyndi Lauper	1983	Džínovej kluk	Hana Zagorová	Pavel Žák	1985	
Give It Time	Middle Of The Road	1971	Kormorán	Jana Robbová	Vladimír Poštulka	1972	
Give Me More	The Teens	1980	Nebuď sám	Eva Hurychová	Václav Hons	1982	
Give Me Your Heart Tonight	Shakin' Stevens	1982	To už znám	Monika Stachová	Michal Bukovič	1984	
Give Your Best	Bee Gees	1969	Dík, že smím pár přátel mít	Pavel Bobek	Pavel Vrba	1975	
Gone To Alabama	Mickey Newbury	1978	Spím v obilí	Michal Tučný, Walda Gang	Vladimír Poštulka	1978, 2012	
Good Hearted Woman	Waylon Jennings	1972	Báječná ženská	Michal Tučný	Zdeněk Rytíř	1982	
Goodbye Marie	Johnny Rodriguez	1979	Běž Báro spát	Waldemar Matuška	Eduard Krečmar	1985	
Goodbye, My Love, Goodbye	Demis Roussos	1973	Teď růže k vám jdu krást	Karel Gott	Zdeněk Borovec	1974	
Goodbye, My Love, Goodbye	Demis Roussos	1973	Hej, lásko, nečekej	Věra Špinarová	Michael Prostějovský	1974	
Green, Green Grass of Home	Tom Jones	1966	Vím, že jen sním	Pavel Novák	Novák himself	1967	
Greensleeves (What Child Is This)	English traditional		Dobrodružství s bohem Panem	Marta Kubišová	Miloň Čepelka	1968	
Greensleeves (What Child Is This)	English traditional		Romance šestnáctého léta	Rangers – Plavci	Pavel Žák	1977	
Greensleeves (What Child Is This)	English traditional		Být dítětem svícítím	Lucie Bílá	Pavel Vrba	2013	
Hafanana	Afric Simone	1975	Favorit	Lenka Filipová	Pavel Žák	1981	
Hafanana	Afric Simone	1975	Hafanana	Daniel Nekonečný	Pavel Žák	2002	
Hallelujah	Leonard Cohen	1984	Zní nové Haleluja	Jitka Zelenková	Pavel Vrba	2007	
Hallelujah Freedom	Junior Campbell	1972	Já se těším do nebe	Spiritual kvintet	Dušan Vančura	1992	
Hand In Hand	Koreana	1988	Všichni zvítězí	Helena Vondráčková & Karel Černoch	Eduard Krečmar	1989	
Hands Up (Give Me Your Heart)	Ottawan	1981	Strejda Honza	Těžkej Pokondr	Lou Fanánek Hagen	1998	
Hands Up (Give Me Your Heart)	Ottawan	1981	Ruce vzhůru (Lásko vzdej se)	Monika Stachová	Michal Bukovič	1981	
Hang On Sloopy	The McCoys	1962	Malej kluk	Jana Hošpesová & Prominence	Hana Čiháková	1970	
Happy	Sita	2001	Srdcotepec	Aneta Langerová	Oskar Petr	2004	
Happy New Year	ABBA	1980	Happy New Year	Daniela Šinkorová	Eduard Krečmar	2006	
Happy Xmas (War Is Over)	John Lennon with Plastic Ono Band	1971	Až za modrou horou	Věra Špinarová		1974	
Happy Xmas (War Is Over)	John Lennon with Plastic Ono Band	1971	Zkus nakreslit přání	Jiří Helekal		1976	
Happy Xmas (War Is Over)	John Lennon with Plastic Ono Band	1971	To k Vánocům patří	Jiří Korn & Pavla Forstová		1989	
Happy Xmas (War Is Over)	John Lennon with Plastic Ono Band	1971	Hodně Štěstí	Dagmar Patrasová		1993	
Happy Xmas (War Is Over)	John Lennon with Plastic Ono Band	1971	Šťastné svátky	Iveta Bartošová		2009	
Happy Xmas (War Is Over)	John Lennon with Plastic Ono Band	1971	Hodně štěstí	Helena Vondráčková	Eduard Krečmar	1974	
Harper Valley PTA	Jeannie C. Riley	1968	Rodičovské sdružení	Naďa Urbánková & Country Beat Jiřího Brabce	Jiří Grossmann	1984	
Have You Seen Her	The Chi-Lites	1971	Neusínej	Václav Neckář	Zdeněk Rytíř	1972	
He Ain't Heavy, He's My Brother	The Hollies	1969	Buď mi sestrou, buď mi bráchou	Karel Gott	Zdeněk Borovec	1990	
Heart Of Gold	Neil Young	1972	Pojď	Jiří Schelinger	František Ringo Čech	1975	
Heartbreaker	Dolly Parton	1978	Pár Kroků	Naďa Urbánková	Jaroslav Machek	1978	
Hello Mary Lou	Johnny Duncan, Ricky Nelson	1960; 1961	Haló, brácho můj	Stanislav Hložek & Petr Kotvald	Zdeněk Borovec	1986	
Hello Mary Lou	Johnny Duncan, Ricky Nelson	1960; 1961	Je nás jedenáct	Milan Chladil	Zdeněk Borovec	1963	
Hello World	The Tremeloes	1969	Volám vás helou	Jiří Helekal	František Ringo Čech	1970	
Help Me Make It Through the Night	Kris Kristofferson	1970	Cyrano	Josef Laufer	Josef Laufer	1974	
Help Me Make It Through The Night	Kris Kristofferson	1970	Když už víc nesmím si přát	Naďa Urbánková			
Help Me Make It Through The Night	Kris Kristofferson	1970	Pomoz mi noc Překlednout	Dostavník			
Help Me Make It Through The Night	Kris Kristofferson	1970	Sundej z hodin závaží	Michal Tučný & Fešáci	Michal Bukovič	1977	
Help!	Beatles	1965	Snídaně v trávě	Karel Černoch	Pavel Žák	1971	
Help! (Get Me Some Help)	Ottawan	1980	Dám všechno, co mám	Petra Černocká	Pavel Černocký	1971	
Here Comes My Baby	The Tremeloes	1967	Než bude ráno	Karel Gott	Jiří Štaidl	1969	
Highway Man	Glen Campbell	1977	Poslední soud	Jindra Malík, Tomáš Linka, František Nedvěd & Josef Vojtek w\ Fešáci			TV version
Highway Man	Glen Campbell	1977	Desperát	Wabi Ryvola & Pavel Bobek	Zdeněk Rytíř	1988	
Highway Patrolman	Bruce Springsteen	1982	Dálniční hlídka	Pavel Bobek	Pavel Vrba	1990	
Hold On	Jamie Walters	1994	Jdu dál	Jakub Smolík	Smolík himself	2004	
Holding Out for a Hero	Bonnie Tyler	1984	Vítr	Lucie Vondráčková	Hana Sorrosová	2006	
Holidays in the Sun	Sex Pistols	1977	Možná zejtra přijede president	Tři sestry		1994	
Holly Holy	Neil Diamond	1969	Dlouho, dlouho spím	Petr Spálený	Pavel Vrba	1979	
Honey Come Back	Glen Campbell	1969	Rána jsou zlá	Jiří Korn	Zdeněk Borovec	1974	
Honey, Honey	ABBA	1974	Asi, asi	Hana Zagorová, Petr Rezek	Pavel Žák	1975	
Hope Against Hope	Danni Elmo	2006	Navzdory hříchům	Petr Kolář	Viktor Dyk	2011	
Hot Stuff	Donna Summer	1979	Náskok	Hana Zagorová	Pavel Žák	1979	
Hot Stuff	Donna Summer	1979	Tak já ti mávám	Věra Špinarová	Zbyšek Malý	1979	
Hot Stuff	Donna Summer	1979	Láskám	Karel Gott	Eduard Krečmar	1979	
Hotel California	Eagles	1977	Hotel California	Jiří Korn	Zdeněk Borovec	1979	
Hotel California	Eagles	1977	Hotel California	Jakub Smolík		2011	
House Of The Rising Sun	traditional, popularized by The Animals	1964	Dům u bílých vran	Karel Gott	Zdeněk Borovec	1977	
House Of The Rising Sun	traditional, popularized by The Animals	1964	Dům u vycházejícího slunce	Jaromír Mayer	Zdeněk Borovec	1965	
Houston	Dean Martin	1965	Houston	Greenhorns	Honza Vyčítal	1968	
Houston	Dean Martin	1965	Houston	Pavel Bobek	Jiří Grossmann	1970	
How Deep Is Your Love	Bee Gees	1977	Tisíc sluncí	Pavel Liška & Bobina Ulrichová	Vladimír Čort	1979	
How Deep Is Your Love	Bee Gees	1977	Nejkrásnější sen	Kardinálové Zdeňka Merty	Pavel Žák	1979	
How Do I Live	LeAnn Rimes	1997	Jak se dá žít bez lásky	Hana Buštíková	Eduard Krečmar	2013	
How Do You Do!	Roxette	1992	Abstinuju	Petr Čejka Band	Petr Čejka	2004	
Hunting Tigers Out In Indiah	Bonzo Dog Band	1962	Tygr z Indie	Viktor Sodoma & Skupina Františka František Ringo Čecha	František Ringo Čech	1974	
I Can Help	Billy Swan	1974	Je mi hej	Vlasta Koudelová	Vlasta Koudelová	1976	
I Can't Stop Loving You	Don Gibson; Ray Charles	1958; 1962	Chci zapomenout	Pavel Novák, Jaromír Mayer, Karel Hála	Jiřina Fikejzová	1966	
I Don't Wanna Dance	Eddy Grant	1982	Dívka závodník	Karel Gott	Eduard Krečmar	1983	
I Dreamed A Dream	Rose Laurens	1980	Knížka snů	Helena Vondráčková	Zdeněk Borovec	1992	
I Drove All Night	Roy Orbison, Cyndi Lauper	1989	Noční král	Karel Gott	Eduard Krečmar	2002	
I Got A Mule			Osel Jerry	Spiritual kvintet	Jiří Tichota	1992	
I Got Stripes	Johnny Cash	1959	Šlapej dál	Michal Tučný & Greenhorns	Honza Vyčítal	1972	
I Got You Babe	Sonny & Cher	1965	Kousek tebe	Dana Hobzová & Josef Laufer	Josef Laufer	1967	
I Hear You Knockin'	Smiley Lewis; Dave Edmunds	1955; 1970	Pár dnů prázdnin	Václav Neckář	Miroslav Černý	1974	
I Just Called To Say I Love You	Stevie Wonder	1984	To byl vám den	Karel Gott	Václav Hons	1985	
I Knew You Were Waiting (For Me)	Aretha Franklin & George Michael	1987	Nic nejde vrátit	Věra Špinarová & Dara Rolins	Jana Rolincová	2001	
I Love To Love	Tina Charles	1976	Mám ráda tvůj smích	Jana Kratochvílová	Františka Janečka	1977	
I Need a Lover	John Cougar Mellencamp	1979	Je to tak prosté a tím právě zvláštní	Věra Špinarová	Michal Przebinda	1980	
I Need More of You	Bellamy Brothers	1985	Každé ráno	Ohaři	Ladislav Něgreš	1992	
I Only Want To Be With You	Dusty Springfield	1963	Chytila jsem na pasece motýlka	Helena Vondráčková	Jiří Štaidl	1966	
I Say a Little Prayer	Dionne Warwick	1967	Proč mě nikdo nemá rád	Helena Vondráčková, Ilona Csáková	Zdeněk Borovec	1969, 1999	
I Say A Little Prayer	Dionne Warwick	1967	Seju vítr do tvejch snů	Hana Zagorová	Vladimír Čort		
I Swear	John Michael Montgomery	1994	Hraj fér	Tomáš Linka		1995	
I Take a Lot of Pride in What I Am	Merle Haggard	1968	Mám radost	Rangers – Plavci	Miroslav Černý	1971	
I Wanna Dance with Somebody (Who Loves Me)	Whitney Houston	1987	Mám nový vůz	Helena Vondráčková	Lucie Stropnická (daughter of Zdeněk Borovec)	1988	
I Want To Know What Love Is	Foreigner	1984	Bez lásky láska není	Jitka Zelenková	Eduard Pergner	1987	
I Want To Know What Love Is	Foreigner	1984	A znamení žádné	Kontrast	Vladimír Čort	1987	
I Want You	Bob Dylan	1966	Řekni, kde jsi	Bob Frídl	Oskar Mann	1974	
I Will Survive	Gloria Gaynor	1978	Já půjdu dál	Helena Vondráčková	Hana Sorrosová	1999	
I Won't Let the Sun Go Down on Me	Nik Kershaw	1983	Vrásky si nedělám	Petr Kotvald	Miroslav Černý	1986	
I'd Love You to Want Me	Lobo	1972	Vejdi	Josef Laufer	Josef Laufer himself	1973	
I'm A Believer	The Monkees	1966	Věřím	Pavel Novák	Jiří Aplt	1967	
I'm A Believer	The Monkees	1966	Párty	Iveta Bartošová	Pavel Vrba	1996	
I'm Comin' Home, Cindy	Trini Lopez	1966	Teď nemám čas, možná jindy	Karel Gott	Jiří Štaidl	1969	
I'm From The South, I'm From Georgia	Les Humphries Singers	1969	Hurá, hurá	Pavel Sedláček	Vladimír Mertlík	1974	
I'm From The South, I'm From Georgia	Les Humphries Singers	1969	Hej hou	Aleš Ulm & Kardinálové	Aleš Ulm	1974	
I'm Not Supposed To Care	Gordon Lightfoot	1976	Tvou vůni stále znám	František Nedvěd	Dušan Vančura	2000	
I'm On Fire	5000 Volts	1975	Express mléčné dráhy	Marie Rottrová	Vladimír Čort	1976	
I'm So Excited	Pointer Sisters	1982	Nechci tě trápit	Black Milk	Jana Rolincová	2002	
I've Never Been In Love	Suzi Quatro	1979	Předposlední vlak	Věra Špinarová	Miroslav Černý	1980	
If I Could Turn Back Time	Cher	1989	Kdyby čas zůstal stát	Šárka Rezková	Hana Sorrosová	2004	
If I Were A Carpenter	Bobby Darin, Tim Hardin	1966	Kdybych já byl kovářem	Petr Spálený	Pavel Vrba	1969	
If You Could Read My Mind	Gordon Lightfoot	1970	Devatenáct	František Nedvěd	Dušan Vančura	1999	
If You Could Read My Mind	Gordon Lightfoot	1970	Tím víc tě mám rád	Karel Zich	Ivo Fischer	1974	
If You Love Me (Let Me Know)	Olivia Newton-John	1974	Dej mi lásku	Miluška Voborníková	Michael Žantovský	1980	
If You Want My Love	Cheap Trick	1982	Moje díky patří vám	Petr Rezek	Petr Rezek	1985	
Imagine	John Lennon	1971	Představy	Zdenka Lorencová	Zdenka Lorencová	1980	
Imagine	John Lennon	1971	Představ si	Michal Prokop	Mirek Černý	1974	
In the Ghetto	Elvis Presley	1969	Černošské ghetto	Karel Zich & Spirituál Kvintet	František Novotný	1971	
In the Ghetto	Elvis Presley	1969	Ghetto	Josef Laufer	Josef Laufer	1995	
In the Jailhouse Now	Jimmy Rodgers; Johnny Cash	1928; 1962	To všecho vodnes čas	Waldemar Matuška	Jiří Suchý	1977	
In The Summertime	Mungo Jerry	1970	Rok s Monikou	Stanislav Hranický	Karel Čejka	1971	
In The Summertime	Mungo Jerry	1970	Nejsem harlekýn	Milan Drobný	Karel Čejka	1971	
In the Year 2525	Zager and Evans	1969	V století dvacátém devátém	Marta Kubišová	Zdeněk Rytíř		
Is This the Way to Amarillo	Tony Christie, Neil Sedaka,	1971; 1977	Kvítek mandragory	Helena Vondráčková, Karel Gott	Zdeněk Rytíř	1972	
Is This The Way To Amarillo	Tony Christie, Neil Sedaka,	1971; 1977	Nápis na dveřích	Jiří Hromádka	Pavel Žák	1972	
It Takes Two	Marvin Gaye & Kim Weston	1965	Jen ty a já	Karel Gott & Helena Vondráčková	Eduard Krečmar	2003	
It's A Heartache	Bonnie Tyler	1977	Jen se hádej	Karel Gott, Waldemar Matuška & Olga Blechová & KTO	Eduard Krečmar	1979, 1982	
It's A Heartache	Bonnie Tyler	1977	Dal's mi lásku	Jana Robbová	Vladimír Čort	1979	
It's A Real Good Feeling	Peter Kent	1980	To se na očích pozná	Michal David	Jaroslav Machek	1981	
It's My Party	Lesley Gore	1963	Žádný party	Lucie Bílá	Gábina Osvaldová	1998	
It's Not Unusual	Tom Jones	1965	Před týdnem	Pavel Novák			
It's Not Unusual	Tom Jones	1965	Jeden týden	Pavel Novák	Novák himself	1967	
It's Not Unusual	Tom Jones	1965	Červánky	Marta Kubišová	Eduard Krečmar	1968	
It's Only Christmas	Ronan Keating	2009	Mé dětské svátky	Hana Zagorová	Hana Zagorová	2011	
Jackson	Johnny Cash & June Carter	1963	Jackson	Naďa Urbánková & Jiří Grossmann	Jiří Grossmann	1975	
Jackson	Johnny Cash & June Carter	1963	Jackson	Karel Zich & Wanda Jackson	Michal Bukovič	1987	
Jailer, Bring Me Water	Bobby Darin	1962	Jó, třešně zrály	Waldemar Matuška	Ivo Fischer	1964	
Japanese Boy	Aneka	1981	Mimořádná linka (Prague–Tokyo)	Hana Zagorová	Michael Prostějovský	1982	
Jennifer Juniper	Donovan	1968	Čaroděj dobroděj	Václav Neckář (Micro-Magic-Circus)	Zdeněk Rytíř	1969	
Jenny, Jenny (Dreams Are Ten A Penny)	Kincade	1972	Dej písním jména dívek	Fontána		1973	
Jenny, Jenny (Dreams Are Ten A Penny)	Kincade	1972	Hrej mi, hrej mi	Eva Pilarová	Zdeněk Rytíř	1973	
Jesse	Carly Simon	1980	Nesmíš	Lenka Filipová	Eduard Krečmar	1980	
Jingle Bells	traditional	1850	Rolničky	Karel Černoch, Karel Gott, Lucie Bílá, Jitka Zelenková, Rudolf Cortéz, Dáda Patrasová and many others	Vladimír Dvořák	1990	
Juliet	Robin Gibb	1983	Julie	Arnošt Pátek	Hana Horecká	1984	
Just My Imagination (Running Away With Me)	The Temptations	1971	Bylo to jen zdání	Tereza Černochová & Karel Černoch	Eduard Krečmar	2005	
Just One Look	The Hollies	1963	Tenhle kluk	Jiřina Menšlová & Eva Fatková, Betka Stanková	Jiřina Menšlová	1966, 2002	
Just The Way You Are	Bruno Mars	2010	Když vidím tvou tvář	Vláďa Hron	Hron himself	2012	
Kara Kara	New World	1971	Houpací kůň	Jiří Korn	Jiří Štaidl	1972	
Killing Me Softly with His Song	Lori Lieberman	1972	Dvě malá křídla	Helena Vondráčková	Zdeněk Borovec	1974	
Kiss And Say Goodbye	The Manhattans	1976	Teď už víš, že jsem to já	Karel Gott, Jiří Němeček	Zdeněk Rytíř	1978	
Kitty; Mickey	Racey; Toni Basil	1979; 1982	Hej, taste	Hana Zagorová, Stanislav Hložek & Petr Kotvald	Pavel Žák	1983	
Knockin' On Heaven's Door	Bob Dylan	1973	Andělů chór	Pavel Landovský		2013	
Knockin' On Heaven's Door	Bob Dylan	1973		Děda Mládek Illegal Band		2002	
Knockin' On Heaven's Door	Bob Dylan	1973	Nebeská brána	Petr Kalandra	Petr Kalandra himself	1973	
L.A. International Airport	Susan Raye	1971	Zlatý kočár	Jitka Zelenková	Michael Prostějovský	1971	
L.A. International Airport	Susan Raye	1971	Podzim už se zase blíží	Hana Horecká		1999	
La Luna	Belinda Carlisle	1989	La Luna	Pavla Forstová	Michal Bukovič	1990	
Lady	Kenny Rogers	1980	Nejsi	Jiří Korn	Zdeněk Borovec	1980	
Lady D'Arbanville	Cat Stevens	1970	Má paní, pověz mi	Viktor Sodoma	František Ringo Čech	1972	
Lady in Black	Uriah Heep	1971	Slečna Závist	Arakain	Aleš Brichta	1995	
Lady, Lady, Lady	Joe Esposito	1983	Dívka zvaná lady	Vladimír Kerndl	Jaroslav Machek	1984	
Last Christmas	Wham!	1984	Zář vánoc	Petr Kotvald	Pavel Cmíral	1999	
Last Christmas	Wham!	1984	Rok a den	Lunetic		1999	
Lay Down Beside Me	Don Williams	1976	Pojď dál a zpívej	Pavel Bobek	Vladimír Poštulka	1978	
Leaving On A Jet Plane	John Denver, Peter, Paul & Mary	1966; 1967	Čekej na můj Jumbo Jet	Hana Lounová	Wabi Ryvola	1995	
Leaving On A Jet Plane	John Denver, Peter, Paul & Mary	1966; 1967	Už chvíli hlásí tvůj let	Jezinky	Zdeněk Rytíř	1972	
Leaving On A Jet Plane	John Denver, Peter, Paul & Mary	1966; 1967	Pánbůh řekl vraťte se	Jakub Smolík	Pavel Cmíral	2002	
Leaving On A Jet Plane	John Denver, Peter, Paul & Mary	1966; 1967	Spinkej	Spiritual Kvintet	Dušan Vančura	1971	
Leaving On A Jet Plane	John Denver, Peter, Paul & Mary	1966; 1967	Spinkej a povídej	Zdenka Lorencová	Zdenka Lorencová	1975	
Let It Go	Idina Menzel	2013	Najednou	Monika Absolonová			
Let Me Be There	Olivia Newton-John	1973	Tvůj stín	Miluška Voborníková & Josef Švehla	Mirek Černý	1974	
Let Your Love Flow	Bellamy Brothers	1976	Běž za svou láskou	Karel Gott	Mirek Černý	1977	
Let's Dance	Chris Rea	1987	Tančím	Robert Křesťan	Robert Křesťan	1996	
Let's Twist Again	Chubby Checker	1961	Jsi známý grafoman	Eva Pilarová	Michal Bukovič	1983	
Little Girl	Casey Jones & The Governors	1966	Malinká	Pavel Novák, skupina Saturnin Pavla Skalického	Eduard Krečmar	1967	
Little Willy	The Sweet	1972	Malej Vilibald	Hana Zagorová	Eduard Krečmar	1973	
Live Forever	Billy Joe Shaver	1993	Já budu žít na věky	Michal Tučný	Zdeněk Rytíř	1994	
Live Is Life	Opus	1973	Jen tak dál	Rangers – Plavci	Mirek Černý	1986	
Live Is Life	Opus	1973	Prejs to čmajz	Těžkej Pokondr		2011	
Lonely Boy	Sex Pistols	1979	O melouny boj	Tři sestry		1993	
Long Goodbyes	Camel	1984	Sčítám čas	Petr Rezek	Rezek himself	1986	
Long Haired Lover From Liverpool	Little Jimmy Osmond	1972	Blonďák s červenou Bugatkou	Naďa Urbánková	Zdeněk Borovec	1973	
Long Train Runnin'	Doobie Brothers	1973	Sedmkrát	Black Milk	Jana Rolincová	2003	
Longfellow Serenade	Neil Diamond	1974	Velký muž serenád	Petr Spálený	Pavel Vrba	1978	
Looking For Freedom	Marc Seaberg; David Hasselhoff	1978; 1988	Báječný víkend	Pavel Liška	Bobina Ulrichová	1979	
Lord Have Mercy on a Country Boy	Don Williams	1991	Country Boy	Pavel Bobek	Vladimír Poštulka	1993	
Lost in Love	Air Supply	1980	Mosty	Lenka Filipová, Karel Zich	Michal Bukovič	1981	
Love	John Lennon	1970	Otázky	Jiří Korn	Zdeněk Borovec	1980	
Love for Sale	Talking Heads	1986	Můra Stb	Pangeit		1991	
Love Grows (When My Rosemary Goes)	Edison Lighthouse	1970	Rosemary	Václav Neckář	Zdeněk Rytíř	1970	
Love Is Kind, Love Is Wine	The Seekers	1968	Láska je věc kouzelná	Rangers – Plavci	Antonín Hájek	1971	
Love Lifted Me	hymn Kenny Rogers	1912; 1976	Bůh mě má rád	Pavel Bobek	Vladimír Poštulka	1993	
Love Me Tender	Elvis Presley	1956	Pár havraních copánků	Karel Gott, Věra Martinová	Zbyněk Vavřín	1964, 1993	
Love Must Carry On	Monrose	2010	Jsem tvůj tichý pacient	Lucie Bílá	Pavel Vrba	2012	
Love To Hate You	Erasure	1991	Láska tě spoutá	Petr Muk	Jan Dvořák	2004	
Love, Oh Love	Lionel Richie	1992	Ať láska...	Marta Kubišová, Daniel Hůlka	Pavel Vrba	1995, 1997	
Lucky	Bernie Paul	1978	Taky (mám život rád)	Miroslav Dudáček	Michal Bukovič	1979	
Lucky	Bernie Paul	1978	Štěstí	Marie Rottrová	Pavel Žák	1980	
Lucky Lips	Cliff Richard	1957	Šťastná ústa	Karel Zich	Eduard Krečmar	1989	
Machinery	Sheena Easton	1982	Program 105	Marie Rottrová	Jaroslav Wykrent	1985	
Magic	Olivia Newton-John	1980	Magie lásky	Marcela Králová	Vladimír Čort	1983	
Making Music For Money	Kenny Rogers	1978	Zpívat chtěl bych si sám	Pavel Bobek	Michael Žantovský	1984	
Making Music For Money	Kenny Rogers	1978	Důvěrně známý	Josef Laufer	Josef Laufer	1984	
Making Music For Money	Kenny Rogers	1978	Kytara mě láká	Milan Drobný	Milan Drobný	1985	
Making Your Mind Up	Bucks Fizz	1981	A desky dál stárnou	Martha A Tena Elefteriadu	Vladimír Čort	1982	
Mama	B. J. Thomas	1966	Máma	Václav Neckář	Zdeněk Rytíř	1974	
Mama (When My Dollies Have Babies)	Cher	1967	Mama	Marta Kubišová	Eduard Krečmar	1968	
Brandy; Mandy	Scott English, Barry Manilow	1971; 1974	Jsou svátky	Karel Gott	Zdeněk Borovec	1990	
Mandy	Scott English; Barry Manilow	1971; 1974	Vejdi	Karel Zich	Pavel Vrba	1976	
Maniac	Michael Sembello	1983	Mánie	Blíženci	Michal Bukovič	1984	
Maniac	Michael Sembello	1983	Mánie	Daniela Šinkorová	Miloš Skalka	2003	
Marie, Marie	The Blasters; Shakin' Stevens	1980; 1982	To víš, to víš	Michaela Linková	Jaroslav Machek	1983	
Marigot Bay	Arabesque	1980	Tak už to vzdej	Ivana Máchová & Jezinky	František Řebíček	1981	
Martin Eden	Billie Hughes	1979	Tulák po hvězdách	Petr Rezek	Zdeněk Rytíř	1984	
Mary's Boy Child	Harry Belafonte; Jim Reeves	1956; 1963	Syn boží stal se člověkem	Karel Černoch	Zdeněk Borovec	1990	
Mary's Boy Child	Harry Belafonte; Jim Reeves	1956; 1963	Ave-Ave	Waldemar Matuška, Iveta Bartošová	Ivo Fischer	?, 2005	
Massachusetts	Bee Gees	1967	Massachusetts	Václav Neckář	Jiřina Fikejzová	1968	
Matador	Garland Jeffreys	1980	Matador	Jiří Štědroň	Vladimír Poštulka	1981	
Matador	Garland Jeffreys	1980	Matador	Viktor Sodoma	Karel Šíp	1980	
Me And Bobby McGee	Janis Joplin	1971	Chvíle, kdy jsem byl s ní	Pavel Bobek	Vladimír Poštulka	1975	
Me and You and a Dog Named Boo	Lobo	1971	Já, ty a pes	Karel Zich	Michael Žantovský	1981	
Mendocino	Sir Douglas Quintet	1969	Mendocino	Milan Drobný	Jiří Grossmann	1970	
Mercury Blues	K. C. Douglas; Alan Jackson	1948; 1992	Ráno plný pohody	Karel Černoch	Michal Bukovič	1997	
Merry Christmas Everyone	Shakin' Stevens	1985	Hezké svátky	Josef Vágner	Eduard Krečmar	2011	
Mexico	Les Humphries Singers	1969	Mexiko	Komety Jiřího Kaleše	František Ringo Čech	1973	
Mexico	Les Humphries Singers	1969	Mexiko	Eva Pilarová	Zdeněk Borovec	1973	
Midnight Special	Creedence Clearwater Revival	1969	Dál než slunce vstává	Martha & Tena Elefteriadu	Petr Ulrych	1971	
Midnight Special	Creedence Clearwater Revival	1969	Můj vlak vysněnej	Country Beat Jiřího Brabce			
Miss You Tonite	Kim Carnes	1981	Stáří	Hana Zagorová	Hana Zagorová	1982	
Mighty Quinn	Manfred Mann	1968	Přítel Quinn	Golden Kids	Zdeněk Rytíř	1968	
Mistletoe and Wine	Cliff Richard	1988	Nejštědřejší den	Helena Vondráčková	Zdeněk Borovec	1995	
Money, Money, Money	ABBA	1976	Jak se člověk mýlí	Jiří Korn	Mirek Černý	1977	
Money, Money, Money	ABBA	1976	Létací stroj (Šlapej, šlapej)	Hana Zagorová & Helena Vondráčková	Vladimír Poštulka	1978	
Moonlight Shadow	Mike Oldfield & Maggie Reilly	1983	Bílý měsíc	Michaela Linková	Miroslav Černý	1983	
Mr. Bass Man	Sha Na Na	1962	Hej, mistře basů	Hana Zagorová & Karel Vágner	Pavel Žák	1983	
Mull Of Kintyre	Wings	1977	Málo mě znáš	Miroslav Dudáček	Pavel Vrba	1978	
My Boy Lollipop	Barbie Gaye; Millie Small	1956; 1964	Mně se líbí Bob	Yvonne Přenosilová (later Betka Stanková)	Jiřina Fikejzová	1965 (2001)	
My Oh My	Slade	1983	Máj je máj	Hana Zagorová	Zdeněk Rytíř	1984	
My Spirit Flies	Frankie Barranco	2012	Kdy vzlétnu já	Lucie Vondráčková	Pavel Cmíral & Lucie Vondráčková		
My Way, Comme d'habitude	Claude François, Frank Sinatra	1967; 1969	Má pouť	Petra Janů	Eduard Krečmar	1992	
My Way, Comme d'habitude	Claude François, Frank Sinatra	1967; 1969	Má pouť	Karel Gott, Karel Hála	Zdeněk Borovec		
My Way, Comme d'habitude	Claude François, Frank Sinatra	1967; 1969	I to se stává	Richard Adam, Eva Pilarová			
My Toot-Toot	Denise Lasalle	1985	Tu, tu	Hana Zagorová	Pavel Žák	1986	
Nag	The Halos	1961	Dívčí internát	Heidi	Vladimír Čort	1982	
Needles and Pins	Jackie DeShannon, Smokie	1963; 1977	Mýdlový princ	Václav Neckář	Michael Prostějovský	1980	
Needles and Pins	Jackie DeShannon, Smokie	1963; 1977	Účet a cink	Argema	Ivan Rössler	1999	
Never Can Say Goodbye	The Jackson 5 Gloria Gaynor	1971; 1974	Jen hloupí se loučí s láskou	Marie Rottrová	Miloň Čepelka	1979	
Never Ending Song Of Love	The New Seekers	1971	Otcova hůl	Rangers – Plavci	Antonín Hájek	1973	
Never Ending Story	Limahl	1984	Galaxie přání	Leona Machálková		1998	
Next Door to an Angel	Neil Sedaka	1962	Po hlavě skoč jen tak	Linda Finková & Pavel Noha	Zdeněk Borovec	1986	
No Milk Today	Herman's Hermits	1966	Né, pětku né	Josef Melen	František Ringo Čech	1984	
No Time For A Tango	Snoopy	1978	Tango	František Havlíček & Kardinálové Zdeňka Merty	Petra Černocká	1980	
Nothing's Gonna Stop Us Now	Starship	1987	Nic nás nezastaví	Karel Gott & Gabriela Gunčíková	Jaroslav Machek	2012	
Oh! Carol	Neil Sedaka	1959	Karel	Stanislav Hložek & Petr Kotvald	Pavel Žák	1985	
Oh L'amour	Erasure	1986	Oh L'Amour	Petr Muk	Jan Dvořák	2004	
Oh Susie	Secret Service	1979	Oh Suzi	Stanislav Hložek & Petr Kotvald	Zdeněk Borovec	1981	
Oh, Lonesome Me	Don Gibson	1957	Ptačí nářečí	Karel Gott; Milan Drobný; Věra Martinová; Žlutý pes	Jiří Štaidl	1965	
Okie From Muskogee	Merle Haggard	1969	Já tajně cvičím	Michal Tučný & Fešáci	Marta Novotná	1969	
On Susan's Floor	Gordon Lightfoot	1972	Poprvé sám	František Nedvěd	Dušan Vančura	1998	
One Friend	Dan Seals	1984	Zlatá rybka	František Nedvěd	Dušan Vančura	1999	
One Piece At A Time	Johnny Cash	1976	Cadillac	Jan Vyčítal & Greenhorns	Honza Vyčítal	1979	
One Way Ticket	Neil Sedaka; Eruption	1959; 1979	Prázdný expres	Naďa Urbánková	Miroslav Černý	1980	
One Way Ticket	Neil Sedaka; Eruption	1959; 1979	Nandej briket	Těžkej Pokondr	Lou Fanánek Hagen	2001	
One Way Wind	Cats	1971	Se mnou vítr rád si brouká	Karel Gott	František Řebíček	1978	
Only You	Yazoo	1982	Only You	Lunetic	David Škach	1998	
Ooh Shooby Doo Doo Lang	Aneka	1982	Já netančím	Marcela Králová	Vladimír Čort	1983	
Orange Blossom Special	Johnny Cash	1965	Oranžový expres	Greenhorns	Honza Vyčítal	1971	
Paloma Blanca	George Baker Selection	1975	Být sluncem na tvých víčkách	Věra Špinarová & Zdeněk Mann	Zbyšek Malý	1975	
Paloma Blanca	George Baker Selection	1975	Vítr si jen tak brnká	Yvetta SImonová & Milan Chladil	Zdeněk Borovec	1976	
Paloma Blanca	George Baker Selection	1975	Holka z cest	Milan Černohouz	Jaroslav Dvořák	1976	
Part of the Union	Strawbs	1973	Láska není ring	Miluška Voborníková	Eduard Pergner	1973	
Party's Not Over	Bernie Paul	1987	Parta se mění	Linda Finková & Pavel Noha	Michal Bukovič	1986	
Perfect Day	Lou Reed	1972	První den	Lucia Gažiová & David Kraus	Marek Epstein	2013	
Perhaps Love	John Denver & Placido Domingo	1981	Láska prý	Karel Černoch & Peter Dvorský	Zdeněk Rytíř	1989	
Please Come Home for Christmas	Eagles	1960	Na nebi svítí	Dan Bárta	Ivan Hlas	1993	
Please Come Home for Christmas	Eagles	1960	Hvězdy	Lucie Bílá & Kamil Střihavka		2000	
Please Come Home for Christmas	Eagles	1960	Přijď do Vánoc domů	Helena Vondráčková			
Pretty Belinda	Chris Andrews	1969	Belinda	Jiří Štědroň	Eduard Krečmar	1970	
Pretty Woman	Roy Orbison	1964	Pretty Woman	Karel Gott	Miloš Skalka	1998	
Pretty Woman	Roy Orbison	1964	Dej mi sbohem	Miroslav Dudáček	Drahoš Čadek	1979	
Pretty Woman	Roy Orbison	1964	Honem, honem	Lenka Filipová & Karel Zich	Michal Bukovič	1987	
Pretty Woman	Roy Orbison	1964	Zlatej brouk	Jana Matysová	Pavel Vrba	1972	
Private Eyes	Hall & Oates	1981	Král diskoték	Helena Vondráčková	Pavel Žák	1982	
Promise Me	Beverley Craven	1990	Slíbil's víc	Kateřina Brožová		1999	
Proud Mary	Creedence Clearwater Revival	1969	Sny bláznivý	Karel Gott	Michael Prostějovský	1971	
Put Your Hand In The Hand	Anne Murray	1970	Řeka nadějí	Věra Špinarová & Bob Frídl	Vladimír Čort	1971	
Queen Of Hearts	Juice Newton	1981	Spěchám	Hana Zagorová	Pavel Žák	1983	
Queen Of Hearts	Juice Newton	1981	Je to konec, marná sláva	Barbora Lišková	František Ringo Čech	1983	
Raindrops Keep Fallin' on My Head	B. J. Thomas	1969	Jen dva ta loďka může vézt	Helena Vondráčková	Jiří Vondráček	1974	
Rainy Day People	Gordon Lightfoot	1975	Víš co ti sluší	Michal Tučný & Fešáci	Petr Novotný	1981	
Rainy Day People	Gordon Lightfoot	1975	Kočovní herci	František Nedvěd	Dušan Vančura	1998	
Raising My Family	Steve Kekana	1980	Když doma přejdu práh	František Havlíček	Petra Černocká	1983	
Ramaya	Afric Simone	1975	Najdi tón	Rangers – Plavci	Luděk Nekuda	1977	
Rasputin	Boney M.	1978	Žena točí globusem	Bezinky	Michal Bukovič	1979	
Red River Valley	Hugh Cross & Riley Puckett	1928	Červená řeka	Helena Vondráčková	Ivo Fischer	1964	
Release Me	Engelbert Humperdinck	1967	Smutný dům	Karel Hála	Jan Fiala	1967	
Release Me	Engelbert Humperdinck	1967	Trouba	Lucie Bílá	Gábina Osvaldová	1998	
Rest Your Love on Me	Olivia Newton-John & Andy Gibb	1976	Každá trampota má svou mez	Helena Vondráčková & Jiří Korn	Zdeněk Borovec	1981	
Rhythm of the Rain	Cascades	1962	Lehčí než krok deště	Jiří Štědroň	Jiří Štědroň	1967	
Rhythm of the Rain	Cascades	1962	Tichý déšť	Lucie Bílá	Gábina Osvaldová	1998	
River Lady	Roger Whittaker	1976	Prázdný břeh	Lenka Chmelová	Michal Bukovič	1982	
Rockin' All Over The World	Status Quo	1975	Valentýn	Eva Hurychová	Hurychová herself	1983	
Rocky Mountain High	John Denver	1972	Paní má se má	Tomáš Linka & Fešáci	Petr Novotný and Tomáš Linka	1980	
Rosie	Joan Armatrading	1980	Ty nejsi zralý	Hana Zagorová & Stanislav Hložek & Petr Kotvald	Hana Zagorová	1983	
Ruby, Don't Take Your Love to Town	Johnny Darrell; Kenny Rogers	1967; 1969	Oh Ruby, nechtěj mi lásku brát	Pavel Bobek	Jiří Grossmann	1970	
Run Runaway	Slade	1984	My chceme gól	Petra Janů	Zdeněk Borovec	1986	
Run to You	Whitney Houston	1993	Málem	Helena Vondráčková	Hana Sorrosova	1998	
SOS	ABBA	1975	S.O.S.	Jana Giergielová	Josef Laufer	1976	
S.O.S.	ABBA	1975	Žízeň	Hana Zagorová	Pavel Žák	1976	
Sacramento	Middle Of The Road	1972	Sacramento	Markýz John	Jan Vršecký	1972	
Sacrifice	Elton John	1989	Nepřiznáš	Petr Kocman	Hana Sorrosová	2008	
San Francisco Bay	Smokie	1965	Ahoj Praho, tak se měj	František Ringo Čech	František Ringo Čech	1983	
Sandokan	Oliver Onions	1976	Sandokan	Stanislav Hložek & Petr Kotvald & orchestr Karla Vágnera & Bezinky	Miroslav Černý	1983	
Santa Claus Is Coming to Town	Harry Reser and his Orchestra	1934	S tátou být, jak tenkrát	Helena Vondráčková		2014	
Santa Claus Is Coming To Town	Harry Reser and his Orchestra	1934	Svatý čas	David Deyl	Xindl X	2013	
Save Me	Clout	1979	Rýmy	Hana Zagorová	Pavel Žák	1980	
Save the Last Dance for Me	The Drifters	1960	Rezavý vlasy	Petr Spálený	Petr Fleischer	1972	
Save Your Kisses for Me	Brotherhood of Man	1976	Já půjdu tam a ty tam	Helena Vondráčková & Jiří Korn	Zdeněk Borovec	1976	
Saved	Lavern Baker	1961	Bouda na horroru	Marie Rottrová	Pavel Vrba	1977	
Scarborough Fair	English traditional, popularized by Simon & Garfunkel	1966	Jarmark ve Scarborough	Marta Kubišová & Helena Vondráčková, Karel Gott & Marie Kubišová	Zdeněk Borovec	1970	
Scarborough Fair	English traditional, popularized by Simon & Garfunkel	1966	Trh Ve Scarborough	Spiritual kvintet	Dušan Vančura	1972	
Scarborough Fair	English traditional, popularized by Simon & Garfunkel	1966	Láska tíží	Petr Muk	Pavel Vrba	1998	
Sea of Heartbreak	Don Gibson	1961	Snídaně v trávě	Michal Tučný	Zdeněk Rytíř	1981	
Sealed With A Kiss	Brian Hyland	1960	Oči barvy holubí	Karel Gott	Jiří Štaidl	1972	
Secret Lies	Chilly	1982	Rychlokurz	Bezinky	Eduard Pergner	1983	
Selfish	Lisa Lindebergh	2000	Delfín	Aneta Langerová	Pavla Milcová	2004	
Señor Santa Claus	Jim Reeves	1964	Pán Bůh to tak chtěl	Karel Černoch	Zdeněk Borovec	1990	
Sha-La-La-La-Lee	Small Faces]]	1965	Ša-la-la-la-li	Václav Neckář	Zdeněk Rytíř	1966	
She	Charles Aznavour	1974	S ní	Pavel Bartoň	Zdeněk Borovec	1975	
She	Charles Aznavour	1974	Smíš	Eva Olmerová	Ronald Kraus	1981	
She's Always A Woman	Billy Joel	1977	Vím málo	Hana Zagorová, Helena Vondráčková	Zdeněk Rytíř	1983, 2009	
She's Gone	Black Sabbath	1976	Lásko voníš deštěm	Marie Rottrová	Jaromír Nohavica		
Shot Full Of Love	Juice Newton	1981	Nezačínej zas o tom všem	Heidi	Milan Sýkora	1985	
Simple Song Of Freedom	Tim Hardin	1969	Píseň na pět řádků	Petra Černocká (with Kardinálové)	Pavel Žák	1972	
Skydiver	Daniel Boone	1973	Proč potápěč pláče	Jiří Schelinger	Karel Šíp	1974	
Sloop John B (The John B. sails)	traditional, popularized by Beach Boys	1916; 1966	Zvedněte kotvy	Rangers – Plavci		1969	
Sloop John B (The John B. sails)	traditional, popularized by The Beach Boys	1916; 1966	Podivný spáč	Pavel Novák	Vladimír Čort	1968	
So Long	ABBA	1974	Jeho laskominy	Valérie Čižmárová	Michael Janík	1975	
Soldier of Fortune	Deep Purple	1974	Šípková Růženka	Jiří Schelinger, Petr Kolář	Zdeněk Svěrák; Emil Synek	1977; 2007	
Some Broken Hearts Never Mend	Don Williams	1977	Už dávno dal jsem ti klíč	Karel Gott	Eduard Krečmar	1981	
Something's Gotten Hold Of My Heart	David and Jonathan, Gene Pitney	1967	Co jsi jen zač	Karel Gott	Pavel Vrba	1998	
Sometimes When We Touch	Dan Hill	1977	Stokrát chválím čas	Karel Gott	Zdeněk Borovec	1978	
Somewhere My Love	Lara's Theme From "Doctor Zhivago"	1965	Krásné je žít	Milan Chladil, Karel Gott	Jiří Aplt	1967, 1989	
Son Of My Father	Chicory Tip	1971	Já tak mít tátu	Fontána	Ivan Rössler	1973	
Song Sung Blue	Neil Diamond	1972	Zvon snů	Karel Gott	Zdeněk Rytíř	1972	
Soolaimon	Neil Diamond	1970	Sulejmon	Martha & Tena Elefteriadu	Vladimír Poštulka	1971	
Sorry Suzanne	The Hollies	1963	107x	Metronom	Vladimír Poštulka	1969	
Sorry, I'm A Lady	Baccara	1977	Tak se pozná dáma	Valérie Čižmárová	Jaroslav Machek	1978	
Southern Nights	Allen Toussaint; Glen Campbell	1975; 1977	Gentleman	Jiří Korn	Zdeněk Borovec	1980	
Speed of the Sound of Loneliness	John Prine, Nanci Griffith	1986; 1993	Svatební	Petra Černocká	Jan Turek	1996	
Spicks and Specks	Bee Gees	1966	Sto kouzelnejch slok	Karel Černoch	Pavel Žák	1968	
Stand By Your Man	Tammy Wynette	1968	Znám krásnou zem	Zuzana Stirská	Eduard Král	1975	
Stay	Bonnie Tyler	1993	Stůj	Věra Špinarová	Luboš Nečas	2004	
Stop	Sam Brown	1988	Stůj	Lucie Bílá	Gábina Osvaldová	2007	
Stop The Cavalry	Jona Lewie	1980	Co je toho příčinou	Hana Hegerová	Zdeněk Borovec	1990	
Strangers In The Night	Frank Sinatra	1915	Dlouhá bílá noc	Judita Čeřovská	Jiřina Fikejzová	1966	
Strawberry Wine	Deana Carter	1996	Borůvková	Šárka Rezková	Vladimír Poštulka	1997	
Stuck On You	Lionel Richie	1984	Chci tě mít	Jiří Korn	Miroslav Černý	1985	
Stumblin' In	Chris Norman & Suzi Quatro	1978	Ta pusa je má	Hana Zagorová & Petr Rezek	Pavel Žák	1979	
Stumblin' In	Suzi Quatro	1979	Zkomoliny	Tři sestry		2000	
Suddenly You Love Me	The Tremeloes	1958	Lásko, lásko	Petr Němec	Vladimír Čort	1969	
Sugar Town	Nancy Sinatra	1966	Š-š-š (Šepotám)	Helena Blehárová, Zuzana Norisová	Jan Fiala	1967, 2001	
Sugar Town	Nancy Sinatra	1966	Šumění stromů	Helena Vondráčková		1967	
Sugar Town	Nancy Sinatra	1966	Šup ho tam	Těžkej Pokondr		2001	
Suicide Is Painless	Theme from M.A.S.H.	1970	Když přijdou chvíle	Pacifik	Tony Linhart	1995	
Summer Nights	John Travolta & Olivia Newton-John	1978	Letní den	Tři sestry		1991	
Sun Of Jamaica	Goombay Dance Band	1979	Léto je léto	Helena Vondráčková	Pavel Žák	1980	
Sun Of Jamaica	Goombay Dance Band	1979	Slunce života	Jezinky	Miloš Dražil	1980	
Sun Of Jamaica	Goombay Dance Band	1979	V sámošce mejkap	Těžkej Pokondr	Lou Fanánek Hagen	2000	
Sundown	Gordon Lightfoot	1974	Řemeslo	František Nedvěd	Dušan Vančura	1999	
Sunny	Bobby Hebb	1966	Zvony	Naďa Urbánková	Jiří Suchý	1976	
Super Girl	Graham Bonney	1966	Hej, dívko zlá	Václav Neckář	Eduard Krečmar	1966	
Surround Yourself with Sorrow	Cilla Black	1969	Music Box	Věra Špinarová	Vladimír Čort	1970	
Sweet Caroline	Neil Diamond	1969	Vstříc náhodám	Karel Gott	Karel Šíp	1999	
Sweet Caroline	Neil Diamond	1969	Žít sám je fajn	Milan Chladil	Zdeněk Borovec	1974	
Sweet, Sweet Smile	The Carpenters	1978	Náš prima den	Věra Špinarová	Zbyšek Malý	1979	
Sylvia's Mother	Dr. Hook	1972	Sylvie nemá čas	Petr Spálený	Zdeněk Rytíř	1973	
Sylvia's Mother	Dr. Hook	1972	Píseň pro malou Sylii	Jiří Schelinger	Karel Šíp	1973	
Take It Easy (In Your Mind)	Jerry Reed	1972	To se stává	Karel Zich & Jezinky	Ivo Fischer	1973	
Take Me Home, Country Roads	John Denver	1971	Veď mě dál, cesto má	Pavel Bobek	Vladimír Poštulka	1975	
Take My Breath Away	Berlin	1986	Jěště se mi směj	Petra Janů	Eduard Krečmar		
Take On Me	A-ha	1984	Dej si říct	Stanislav Hložek	Šárka Schmidtová	1986	
Teenage Queenie	Pussycat	1981	Přítel Míny	Marcela Holanová	Karel Šíp	1982	
Teenage Superstar	Kim-Lian	2003	Měl's mě vůbec rád	Ewa Farna	Glosr Cvrkalová	2006	
Telegraph Road	Dire Straits	1982	Telegrafní Cesta	Poutníci; Druhá tráva		1987; 2001	
Tell Him	Celine Dion & Barbra Streisand	1997	Toužíš	Lucie Bílá & Helena Vondráčková	Eduard Krečmar	2005	
Tell Me Why	Les Humphries Singers	1969	Za klobouk si vrásky dej	& Kto	Jindřich Faktor	1974	
Tennessee Whiskey	David Allan Coe	1981	Tennessee Whiskey	Petra Černocká	Jan Turek	1996	
Thank God I'm a Country Boy	John Denver	1975	Sláma v botách	Pavel Bobek	Vladimír Poštulka	1977	
Thank God I'm a Country Boy	John Denver	1975	Country boy	Pavel Bobek		1977	
That'll Be The Day	Buddy Holly & The Crickets	1959	V kapse díru mám	Karel Kahovec & Václav Macháček	Ivo Fischer	1979	
The Air That I Breathe	The Hollies	1974	Vzduch, který dýchám	Pavel Bobek	Jan Krůta	1977	
The Air That I Breathe	The Hollies	1974	Dýchat a žít	Jitka Zelenková	Eduard Krečmer	2006	
The Auctioneer	Leroy Van Dyke	1956	Prodavač	Michal Tučný	Michal Bukovič	1978	
The Boss's Daughter	Gene Pitney	1966	Pražská holka	Helena Vrtichová	Eduard Krečmar	1971	
The Boxer	Simon & Garfunkel	2013	Boxer	Radek Tomášek	Vladimír Zázvůrek	1994	
The Captain of Her Heart	Double	1985	Srdcerváč	Kamil Střihavka	Jan Hedl	2008	
The Gambler	Kenny Rogers	1978	Hráč	Petr Spálený	Zdeněk Rytíř	1979	
The Great Snowman	Bob Luman	1961	O. K.	Rangers – Plavci	Ondřej Juřík, Antonín Hájek	1970	
The Heat Is On	Noosha Fox, Agnetha Fältskog	1979; 1982	Ani náhodou	Helena Vondráčková	Mirek Černý	1984	
The Lion Sleeps Tonight	The Tokens	1939	Kniha džunglí	Vlaďka Prachařová	Zdeněk Rytíř	1973	
The One on the Right Is on the Left	Johnny Cash	1966	Kdo byl nalevo, už je napravo	Jan Vyčítal & Greenhorns	Jan Vyčítal	1995	
The Poet And I	Frank Mills	1974	Sen o Vánocích	Karel Gott	Zdeněk Borovec	1981	
The Pushbike Song	The Mixtures	1965	Šlapací kolo	Faraon, Jan John, Jiří Schelinger	Karel Šíp	1971	
The Riddle	Nik Kershaw	1984	Taneční	Petr Kotvald	Pavel Cmíral	1987	
The Rose	Bette Midler	1980	Vyprávění v pokoji	Jitka Zelenková	Eduard Pergner	1981	
The Sound of Silence	Simon & Garfunkel	1963	Básníkův kraj	Bob Frídl	Oskar Mann	1976	
The Sound Of Silence	Simon & Garfunkel	1963	Píseň o tichu	Milan Černohouz	Růžena Sypěnová	1970	
The Times They Are A-Changin'	Bob Dylan	1964	Časy se mění	Marta Kubišová (Golden Kids)	Zdeněk Rytíř	1969	
The Way We Were	Barbra Streisand	1973	Co všem skrývá klaun	Helena Vondráčková	Eduard Krečmar	1993	
The Way We Were	Barbra Streisand	1973	Slýchám harmoniku hrát	Waldemar Matuška	Ivo Fischer	1977	
The Wilderness Mistress	One More Time	1996	Královna pustin	Josef Vágner	Eduard Krečmar	2008	
The Winner Takes It All	ABBA	1980	A ty se ptáš co já	Helena Vondráčková	Zdeněk Borovec	1980	
The Wreck of the 'Antoinette'	Dave Dee, Dozy, Beaky, Mick & Tich	1968	Začíná máj	Pavel Novák	Novák himself	1970	
The Young Ones	Cliff Richard & The Shadows	1961	Jsi jediná	Pavel Novák	Karel Čejka	1966	
There Ain't No Easy Run	Dave Dudley	1968	Řidič má tvrdý chléb	Ladislav Vodička, Jan Vyčítal & Greenhorns	Michal Bukovič	1973	
There Ain't No Easy Run	Dave Dudley	1968	Řidič tvrdý chleba má	Jan Vyčítal & Greenhorns	Michal Bukovič	1979	
There Is Love (Wedding Song)	Noel Paul Stookey	1969	Je teď tvá (Svatební)	Helena Vondráčková	Zdeněk Borovec	1973	
There You'll Be	Faith Hill	2001	S tebou být...	Šárka Rezková	Vladimír Poštulka	2007	
Things	Bobby Darin	1962	Láska je lék	Waldemar Matuška & Olga Blechová	Zdeněk Borovec	1970	
Things We Said Today	Beatles	1964	Tisíc dlouhých dnů	Saturn Pavla Skalického	Vladimír Poštulka	1981	
This Is The Time	Michael Bolton & Wynonna	1996	V tu zázračnou noc	Leona Machálková	Václav Kopta	2001	
This Ole House	Shakin' Stevens	1981	Evžen, lovec žen	Rangers – Plavci	Milan Dufek	1985	
Thought I'd Ring You	Shirley Bassey & Alain Delon	1983	Klíč pro štěstí	Marie Rottrová & Jiří Bartoška	Pavel Kopta	1985	
Till I Loved You	Barbra Streisand & Don Johnson	1988	Těch pár dnů	Helena Vondráčková & Jiří Korn, Helena Vondráčková & Karel Černoch	Zdeněk Borovec	2007, 1993	
Time After Time	Cyndi Lauper	1984	Dej zpátky čas	Leona Machálková	Karel Šíp	1999	
Time After Time	Cyndi Lauper	1984	Snům tváří v tvář	Petra Janů	Michal Horáček	1985	
To Be Superman	Pam N'Pat	1980	Dobrý den	František Ringo Čech & Markéta Muchová	Ringo Čech	1983	
Today I Killed a Man I Didn't Know	White Plains, Nash Chase	1970; 1971	Ó, mámo	Petr Rezek & Ludmila Podubecká	Petr Rezek	1974	
Tonight, I Celebrate My Love	Peabo Bryson & Roberta Flack	1983	Svět stál	Karel Gott & Jitka Zelenková	Eduard Pergner	1985	
Too Much Love Will Kill You	Brian May	1992	V oceánu lásky	Stanislav Hložek (My vyhnaní z ráje)	Michal Bukovič	1995	
Top of the World	The Carpenters	1973	Nejhezčí z našich rán	Stráníci	Milan Sedmík	2002	
Total Eclipse Of The Heart	Bonnie Tyler	1983	Zatmění	Leona Machálková	Pavel Vrba	1999	
Travelling Circus	The Tremeloes	1968	Kupte zvíře	Jiří Schelinger	František Ringo Čech	1975	
Trojan Horse	Luv'	1978	Trojský kůň	Bezinky	Michal Bukovič	1978	
Tweedle Dee, Tweedle Dum	Middle Of The Road	1971	Pan Tydlitýt a pan Tydlidát	Hana Zagorová	Zdeněk Rytíř	1971	
Twentieth Century Fool	Kenny Rogers	1985	Největší blázen	Pavel Bobek	Michael Žantovský	1988	
U Can't Touch This	MC Hammer	1990	Vem Kačky	Těžkej Pokondr		2011	
Unchained Melody	Todd Duncan; The Righteous Brothers	1955; 1965	Lásko má	Karel Gott, Pavel Bartoň, Karel Černoch, Rudolf Cortéz	Zdeněk Borovec	1984	
Unchained Melody	The Righteous Brothers	1955	Tvář za sklem	Věra Špinarová	Vladimír Čortc		
Up Where We Belong	Joe Cocker & Jennifer Warnes	1983	My dva si máme dál co říct	Petra Černocká & Jiří Hradec	Petra Černocká	1983	
Valentino	Champagne	1977	Valentino	Věra Špinarová	Vladimír Čort	1978	
Venus	Shocking Blue	1969	Venuše	Zuzana Hanzlová	Zuzana Hanzlová	1970	
Venus	Shocking Blue	1969	Venuše	Hana Zagorová	Michael Prostějovský	1970	
Video Killed the Radio Star	Bruce Woolley and The Camera Club, Buggles	1979	Potmě nám může rádio hrát	Saturn Pavla Skalického	Jaroslav Machek	1980	
Video Killed The Radio Star	Bruce Woolley and The Camera Club, Buggles	1979	Vidiák ryl by rejhy do spár	Těžkej Pokondr	Lou Fanánek Hagen	2000	
Wabash Cannonball	traditional Johnny Cash	1929; 1965	Ty jsi ze všech nejlepší	Petr Rezek	Miroslav Černý	1974	
Wabash Cannonball	Johnny Cash	1929	Pošta Fešáci 1	FeŠáci	Petr Novotný a Michal Tučný	1983	
Waiting For You	Gordon Lightfoot	1993	Třetí pokus	František Nedvěd	Dušan Vančura	2000	
Walk On The Wild Side	Lou Reed	1972	Zkus se životu dál smát	Pavel Bobek	Michael Žantovský	1981	
Walk Right In	Cannon's Jug Stompers, Dr. Hook	1929; 1977	Štěstí	Rangers – Plavci	Milan Dufek		
Walk Right In	Cannon's Jug Stompers, Dr. Hook	1929; 1977	Opary	Lucie Bílá & Martin Pošta	Gábina Osvaldová	2004	
Walkin' Back to Happiness	Helen Shapiro	1961	S nebývalou ochotou	Marta Kubišová	Eduard Krečmar	1966	
Wanted Man	Johnny Cash	1969	Tam, kde teče Mississippi	Ondřej Čejka	Eduard Král	1975	
Wanted Man	Johnny Cash	1969	Jméno mé	Rangers – Plavci			
Wanted Man	Johnny Cash	1969	Oči dokořán	Václav Prejzek	Václav Prejzek	1973	
Wasn't That A Mighty Day	Biddleville Quintette	1929	Z Betléma se ozývá	Spiritual kvintet	Dušan Vančura		
Way Back Into Love	Hugh Grant & Haley Bennett	2007	Díky letu motýlů	Jitka Válková & Josef Vágner	Pavel Vrba	2010	
We Are The Champions	Queen	1977	Můj stálý šampión	Petra Janů	Michal Bukovič	1985	
We Don't Talk Anymore	Cliff Richard	1979	To jsou fámy	Karel Gott	Eduard Krečmar	1980	
We Shall Not Be Moved	African American spiritual, popularlized by Mavis Staples	1965	Skálou chcem se stát	Naďa Urbánková	Jiří Grossmann	1967	
We Shall Overcome	traditional, popularized by Pete Seeger	1947; 1963	Jednou budem dál	Spiritual kvintet	Ivo Fischer		
We've Got Tonight	Bob Seger; Kenny Rogers & Sheena Easton	1978; 1983	Všímej si víc	Věra Špinarová & Karel Černoch	Zdeněk Borovec	1983	
We've Got Tonight	Bob Seger; Kenny Rogers & Sheena Easton	1978; 1983	Čas dál nech spát	David Deyl & Helena Vondráčková		2012	
What Have They Done to My Song Ma	Melanie	1970	Kam zmizel ten starý song	Helena Vondráčková	Zdeněk Borovec	1971	
When	The Kalin Twins, Showaddywaddy	1958; 1977	Ven	Yvetta Simonová & Milan CHladil	Václav Jelínek		
When	The Kalin Twins, Showaddywaddy	1958; 1977	Ten letní den	Josef Vágner	Václav Jelínek	2007	
When The Rain Begins to Fall	Jermaine Jackson & Pia Zadora	1984	Zatímco déšť si v listí hrál	Helena Vondráčková & Jiří Korn	Zdeněk Borovec	1987	
When The Train Comes Along	Mississippi Fred McDowell		Vláček	Spiritual kvintet	Jiří Tichota	1992	
When You Tell Me That You Love Me	Diana Ross	1991	Když mě přijmeš do svých svátků	Helena Vondráčková	Zdeněk Borovec	2000	
Where Do You Go To (My Lovely)?	Peter Sarstedt	1969	Kdo vchází do Tvých snů, má lásko	Václav Neckář	Zdeněk Rytíř	1973	
Where Have All The Flowers Gone	Pete Seeger	1955	Řekni, kde ty kytky jsou	Marie Rottrová	Jiřina Fikejzová	1975	
Where The Wild Roses Grow	Nick Cave & Kylie Minogue	1995	Divoká růže	Pavel Bobek & Marie Rottrová	Pavel Vrba	2000	
Whisky In The Jar	traditional popularized by The Dubliners and Thin Lizzy	1968; 1972	Toulat se po hvězdách	Miroslav Donutil		1998	
Whisky In The Jar	traditional popularized by The Dubliners; Thin Lizzy	1968; 1972	Whisky plnej džbán	Petr Kocman & Greenhorns	Honza Vyčítal	1999	
Whispering Pines	Johnny Horton	1958	Řekněte jí	Michal Tučný	Honza Vyčítal	1973	
Whispering Pines	Johnny Horton	1958	Háj modřínů	Karel Kahovec	Eduard Krečmar	1970	
White Christmas	Jim Reeves	1942	Bílé Vánoce	Karel Gott, Karel Černoch, Helena Vondráčková, Jitka Zelenková, Rudolf Cortéz, Yvetta Simonová, Jiřína Saláčová	Jaroslav Moravec	1981	
Who'll Come With Me (David's Song)	instrumental written by Vladimir Cosma, lyrics and originally recorded by the sung by the Kelly Family	1979	Údolí vran	Josef Melen & Viktor Sodoma, Bambini di Praga, Jožka Zeman	Jaromír Cenkl	1984	
Who'll Come With Me (David's Song)	Kelly Family	1979	Déšť, vůz a pláč	Daniel Hůlka	Karel Šíp	1997	
Why Do Fools Fall In Love	Frankie Lymon & The Teenagers	1956	Když je noc, má se spát	Marie Rottrová	Zdeněk Borovec	1983	
Why Me	Kris Kristofferson	1973	Pane můj	Michal Tučný	Vít Hrubín	1994	
Why Me	Kris Kristofferson	1973	Hlídej můj spánek	Naďa Urbánková	Zdeněk Borovec	1976	
Why Me	Kris Kristofferson	1973	Dej mi tón	Minesengři	Jaroslav Velinský	1980	
Why Me	Kris Kristofferson	1973	Tady jsem	Karel Gott	Zdeněk Borovec	1981	
Wig-Wam Bam	The Sweet	1972	Vždyť je letní den	Petr Němec	Zdeněk Rytíř	1973	
Will You Love Me Tomorrow	The Shirelles	1960	Jsi krásná	Petr Kotvald	Pavel Cmíral	1999	
Witch Doctor	David Seville	1958	Zázračný doktor	Aťka Janoušková	Zdeněk Borovec	1963	
Woman in Love	Barbra Streisand	1980	To je štěstí	Helena Vondráčková	Pavel Žák	1981	
Wonderful Baby	Don McLean	1974	Nádherná krásko	Pavel Bobek	Vladimír Poštulka	1980	
Words	F. R. David	1982	Sen můj a Lízin	Stanislav Hložek & Petr Kotvald	Zdeněk Borovec	1983	
Words	F. R. David	1982	Vodka mizí	Těžkej Pokondr	Lou Fanánek Hagen	1998	
Words	The Christians	1989	Ta slůvka	Jiří Korn	Zdeněk Borovec	1998	
Working My Way Back to You	The Four Seasons; Detroit Spinners	1966; 1980	Léto jak má být	Karel Gott	Zdeněk Borovec	1980	
World	Bee Gees	1967	Tmou tvých snů	Arnošt Pátek	Jaroslav Machek	1969	
World	Bee Gees	1967	Svět	Václav Neckář	Eduard Krečmar	1969	
Wrong Road Again	Crystal Gayle	1974	Apartmá v hotelu Sen	Vlasta Koudelová	Jaroslav Šprongl	1982	
Yellow River	Christie	1970	Jedou šífy	Viktor Sodoma	Vladimír Poštulka	1971	
Yellow River	Christie	1970	Černá hlína	Speakers	Pavel Cmíral		
You Decorated My Life	Kenny Rogers	1979	Vím, kdo mi dává chuť žít	Pavel Bobek	Michael Žantovský	1981	
You Drive Me Crazy	Shakin' Stevens	1981	Krejčí	Stanislav Hložek	Zdeněk Borovec	1983	
You Make Me Feel Brand Neww	The Stylistics	1973	Ty a já	Waldemar Matuška & Olga Blechová	Ivo Fischer	1974	
You Raise Me Up	Secret Garden; Westlife	2001; 2005	Mně sílu dáš	Josef Vágner	Eduard Krečmar	2007	
You Shook Me All Night Long	AC/DC	1980	Tygřice	Lucie Bílá	Gábina Osvaldová	2009	
You Win Again	Bee Gees	1987	Moh jsem bejt tam, kde ty	Stanislav Hložek	Zdeněk Borovec	1988	
You're My Mate	Right Said Fred	1989	Jsi můj sen	Milan Drobný	Pavel Krejča	2002	
You're Such a Good Looking Woman	Joe Dolan	1970	Má první láska se dnes vdává	Karel Gott	Jiří Štaidl	1970	
You've Lost That Lovin' Feeling	The Righteous Brothers	1964	Za lásku pálím svíci	Karel Gott	Eduard Krečmar	2011	
You've Lost That Lovin' Feeling	The Righteous Brothers	1964	Ten hlas, ten mámin úsměv	Eva Pilarová	Zdeněk Borovec	1974	
Your Love's Return	Gordon Lightfoot	1970	Svatební	František Nedvěd	Dušan Vančura	2000	
Everywhere I Go			Jméno zná i král	Spiritual kvintet	Jiří Tichota	1992	
Fight On!			Útěk z Egypta	Spiritual kvintet	Dušan Vančura	1992	
Follow The Drinking Gourd			Velký vůz	Spiritual kvintet	Jiří Tichota	1992	
He Comes From The Glory			Bim bam	Spiritual kvintet	Dušan Vančura	1992	
I Can't Feel At Home In This World			Dvě báby	Spiritual kvintet	Jiří Tichota	1992	
If You Don't Believe			Někdo pije líh	Spiritual kvintet	Dušan Vančura	1992	
Little Talk With Jesus			Žebravá	Spiritual kvintet	František Novotný	1992	
Mystery Train			Dým, jen dým	Spiritual kvintet	František Novotný	1992	
Oh, Sinner Man			Soudný den	Spiritual kvintet	Dušan Vančura	1992	
Mals Vale Trockar			Když zhořkne ti víno	Spiritual kvintet	Dušan Vančura	1992	
Ella Mia Mamma			Hornická	Spiritual kvintet	Jiří Tichota	1992	
Chambriere, Chambriere			Ouvej, ouvej	Spiritual kvintet	Jiří Tichota	1992	
Pues Que Ya Nunca Nos Veis			Zastaveníčko	Spiritual kvintet	Dušan Vančura	1981	
Olé, Olé, Olé (The Name Of The Game)	Fans	1982	Olé olé olé olé	Karel Vágner & Sbor Amfora	Petr Salava	1988	

== Belgian ==
Original title	Original artist	Original date	Cover title	Cover artist	Cover lyricist	Cover date	Note
Johan et Pirlouit	Henri Seroka	1947 #	Šmoulová země	Hana Zagorová	Jiří Šrámek and Tomáš Vondrovic	1988	

== Bulgarian ==
Original title	Original artist	Original date	Cover title	Cover artist	Cover lyricist	Cover date	Note
Този свят е тъй прекрасен	Lili Ivanova	1970	Žije v kraji růží	Pavel Bartoň	Petr Rada	1973	
Вечност	Lili Ivanova	1973	Já znám tvoji vlídnou tvář	Pavel Bartoň	Richard Bergman	1973	
Море на младостта	Lili Ivanova	1966	A moře bdí	Helena Blehárová	Vladimír Fiala	1971	

== Croatian ==
Original title	Original artist/composer	Original date	Cover title	Cover artist	Cover lyricist	Cover date	Note
Sjedi ćiro na vrh grane	Novi Fosili	1971	Kocour Číro	Skupina Františka Ringo Čecha	František Ringo Čech	1972	

== Czech ==
Original title	Original artist/composer	Original date	Cover title	Cover artist	Cover lyricist	Cover date	Note
Bedna vod whisky	Wabi Ryvola & Miki Ryvola	1968	Bedna od whisky	Wanastowi Vjecy		1991	
Bon soir, mademoiselle Paris	Olympic	1971	Bon soir, mademoiselle Paris	Shalom		1992	
Dědečkův duch	Olympic	1968	Dědečkův duch	Žlutý Pes		1992	
Dlouhá bílá žhnoucí kometa	Jana Kratochvílová	1978	Kometa	Leona Machálková		1999	
Dlouho se mi zdá (Chtít chytit vítr)	Vladimír Merta	1968	Chtít chytit vítr	Mňága a Žďorp		1994	
Habet	Karel Kryl	1969	Habet	Daniel Landa		2004	
Holka s bílou halenou	Petr Novák	1980	Holka s bílou halenou	Eduard Krečmar		2002	
Karavana mraků	Karel Kryl	1979	Karavana mraků	Daniel Landa		2004	
Karavana mraků	Karel Kryl	1979	Karavana mraků	Divokej Bill			
Lady Carneval	Karel Gott	1968	Lady Karneval	Wanastowi Vjecy	Karel Svoboda, Jiří Štaidl	1968, 2007	
Mašinka	Semtex	1998	Mašinka	Maxim Turbulenc		2000	
Morituri te salutant	Karel Kryl	1969	Morituri te salutant	Daniel Landa		2003	
Nagasaki Hirošima	Karel Plíhal		Nagasaki Hirošima	Mňága a Žďorp		2001	
Nápis	Iveta Bartošová	1987	Nápis	Klára		2003	
Od rana mam dobry humor	Majka Ježowska	1981	Já málokdy něco vzdávám	Lenka Chmelová	Petr Markov	1982	
Podej mi ruku a projdem Václavák	Václav Neckář	1980	Podej mi ruku a projdem Václavák	Jaromír Nohavica			
Popelky	Karel Černoch	1971	Popelky	Jakub Smolík		1997	
Proč přicházíš tak pozdě, lásko?	Martha a Tena	1988	Proč přicházíš tak pozdě, lásko?	Pavel Noha		2010	
S cizí ženou v cizím pokoji	Michael Kocáb	1988	S cizím chlapem v cizím pokoji	Lucie Bílá		2006	
Speedy Gonzales	Oldřich Janota		Speedy Gonzales	Mňága a Žďorp		2001	
Stín katedrál	Václav Neckář & Helena Vondráčková	1966	Stín katedrál	Shalom, Bohuš Matuš & Zuzana Norisová, Petr Muk & Helena Vondráčková, many other	Karel Svoboda, Ivo Fischer	1995, 1996, 2000, 2004	
Ta chvíle patří nám	Iveta Bartošová	1988	Jak snadno uvěří se lhářům	Michal David	František Řebíček	1989	
Tam za vodou v rákosí	Waldemar Matuška & Eva Pilarová	1963	Tam za vodou v rákosí	Bára Basiková & Dan Bárta		1994	
Víš	Keks	1981	Víš	Jakub Smolík		1996	
Vizitka	Jan Cézar	1988	Vizitka	Škwor	Františka Janečka	2008	
Vždyť jsou Vánoce	Eva Pilarová & Waldemar Matuška	1965	Vždyť jsou Vánoce	Petr Kotvald & Leona Machálková		1999	
Znám jednu krásnou zahradu	Václav Neckář & Helena Vondráčková	1967	Znám jednu starou zahradu	Petr Muk & Iveta Bartošová	Ivo Fischer	2000	
Zrcadlo	Karel Černoch	1968	Zrcadlo	Petr Muk		2000	
Zrychlený vlak	Oldřich Janota		I cesta může být cíl	Mňága a Žďorp		2001	

== Dutch ==
Original title	Original artist	Original date	Cover title	Cover artist	Cover lyricist	Cover date	Note
In t'kleine café aan de haven	Vader Abraham	1976	Hospůdko známá	Jaromír Mayer	Miloš Dražil	1978	

== French ==
Original title	Original artist	Original date	Cover title	Cover artist	Cover lyricist	Cover date	Note
Acropolis adieu	Mireille Mathieu	1971	Akropolis adieu	Judita Čeřovská	Jiřina Fikejzová	1973	
Amour défendu	Mireille Mathieu	1977	Láska k nám přilétá	Marcela Králová	František Řebíček	1982	
Amoureuse	Véronique Sanson	1972	Svatba mladší sestry	Petra Černocká	Vladimír Kučera	1977	
Aprés toi	Vicky Leandros	1972	Jak mám spát	Helena Vondráčková	Zdeněk Borovec	1972	
Aprés toi	Vicky Leandros	1972	A tak dál mám spát	Věra Špinarová	Zbyšek Malý	1972	
Comment te dire adieu	Francoise Hardy	1968	Rýmování o životě	Hana Hegerová	Pavel Žák	1973	
Comment te dire adieu	Francoise Hardy	1968	Jedno tajemství	Ilona Csáková	Pavel Žák	1999	
Égal	Amanda Lear	1981	Život jde dál	Pavel Vítek		1995	
Et moi, et moi, et moi	Jacques Dutronc	1966	Tak ať	Jiří Schelinger	Karel Šíp	1974	
Hier encore	Charles Aznavour	1964	Když jsem já byl tenkrát kluk	Karel Gott	Zdeněk Borovec	1971	
Je l'aime á mourir	Francis Cabrel	1979	Zamilovaná	Lenka Filipová	Zdeněk Rytíř	1981	
Je suis malade	Serge Lama	1973	To mám tak ráda	Marie Rottrová	Jiřina Fikejzová	1975	
Je t'aime...moi non plus	Jane Birkin & Serge Gainsbourg	1966	Když zbývá pár slov	Ilona Csáková	Vladimír Kočandrle	1998	
L'important c'est la rose	Gilbert Bécaud	1927	Růže kvetou dál	Helena Vondráčková	Ivo Fischer	1967	
La Vie en rose	Édith Piaf	1947	Vyznani v ruzich	Helena Vondráčková	Jiří Traxler	1979	
Laisse-moi petite fille	Hugues Aufray	1965	Sbohem lásko	Waldemar Matuška	Ivo Fischer	1966	
Le mari de mama	Sheila	1972	Vzít lásku do dlaní	Jitka Molavcová	Pavel Žák	1973	
Le rossignol anglais	Hugues Aufray	1965	Slavíci z Madridu	Waldemar Matuška	Ivo Fischer	1968	
Les Champs Élysées	Joe Dassin	1969	Les Champs Elysées	Waldemar Matuška	Zdeněk Borovec	1972	
Ne me quitte pas	Jacques Brel	1959	Lásko prokletá	Hana Hegerová	Pavel Kopta	1977	
Ne me quitte pas	Jacques Brel	1959	Když mě opustíš	Eva Pilarová			
Ne me quitte pas	Jacques Brel	1959	Jestli rád tě má	Naďa Urbánková			
Nous on s'aime	Georges Chelon	1968	Živá láska	Karel Černoch & Jana Brejchová, Jakub Smolík & Eva Vejmelková	Pavel Žák	1973. 1998	
Nous on s'aime	Georges Chelon	1968	Sedmikráska	Jiří Štědroň & Jana Matysová	Vladimír Poštulka	1972	
Poupée de cire, poupée de son	France Gall	1965	Vosková panenka	Eva Pilarová	Zdeněk Borovec	1966	
Toi, moi, nous	Mike Brant	1970	Ukolébavka pro mou lásku	Věra Špinarová	Zbyšek Malý	1979	
Tu t'en vas	Alain Barriére & Noelle Cordier	1975	Kdo má rád	Waldemar Matuška & Olga Blechová	Ivo Fischer	1977	
Un satyre cornu	traditional		Brigadýrek	Spiritual kvintet	Jiří Tichota	1992	

== German ==
Original title	Original artist/composer	Original date	Cover title	Cover artist	Cover lyricist	Cover date	Note
99 Luftballons	Nena	1983	Dederon	Tři Sestry		2000	
Da Da Da	Trio	1982	Da da da, nechci tě víc	Mýdlo	Ladislav Vestárek	1982	
Da Da Da	Trio	1982	Da da da	Tři sestry	Ladislav Vestárek	1995	
Das tapfere Schneiderlein	Doctor D	1983	Televizní dívka Líza	Michaela Linková	Vladimír Kočandrle	1983	
Ein bißchen Frieden	Nicole	1982	Jsme děti slunce	Jaromír Mayer	Jiřina Fikejzová	1982	
Im Wagen vor mir	Henry Valentino & Uschi	1976	Zákaz předjíždění	Petr Rezek & Hana Zagorová	Pavel Žák	1981	
Lieb mich so, wie dein Herz es mag	Chris Doerk & Frank Schöbel	1967	Rozhoupej zvony nad námi	Jaromír Mayer & Eva Pilarová	Zdeněk Borovec	1968	
Marmor, Stein und Eisen bricht	Drafi Deutscher	1965	Její láska	Jaromír Mayer	Ivo Fischer	1967	
Ra-Ta-Ta	Rotation	1970	Zazpívám si ratata	Jiří Korn	František Ringo Čech	1970	
Silent Night; Stille Nacht	composed by Franz Xaver Gruber and Joseph Mohr	1859	Tichá noc	Marta Kubišová, Karel Gott, Lucie Bílá, Karel Černoch, Yvetta Simonová, C&K Vocal, Bohouš Josef and others			
Wenn Musikanten heimwärts fahren	Express	1976	Když muzikanti domů táhnou	Petra Janů	Eduard Krečmar	1982	

== Hungarian ==
Original title	Original artist	Original date	Cover title	Cover artist	Cover lyricist	Cover date	Note
Elmegyek	Péter Máté	1984	Málo mám lásky tvé	Helena Vondráčková	Vladimír Čort	1976	
Gyöngyhajú lány	Omega	1969	Dívka s perlami ve vlasech	Aleš Brichta	Aleš Brichta	1994	
Gyöngyhajú lány	Omega	1969	Paleta	Markýz John	Jan Vršecký	1972	
Hamis fény	Kati Kovács	1978	Buď mou nadějí	Marie Rottrová	Jaromír Nohavica	2001	

== Italian ==
Original title	Original artist	Original date	Cover title	Cover artist	Cover lyricist	Cover date	Note
Buona Domenica	Antonello Venditti	1979	Krásná Domenica	Michal David	Jaroslav Machek	1981	
Con te partirò	Andrea Bocelli	1995	Sen v nás zůstává	Lucie Bílá & Karel Gott	Zdeněk Borovec	1997	
Forse	Pupo	1979	Tenhle film	Viktor Sodoma	Drahomír Čadek	1983	
Fotoromanza	Gianna Nannini	1984	Cesty lásek	Marcela Holanová	Karel Šíp	1986	
Gira l'amore	Gigliola Cinquetti	1964	Láska je láska	Eva Pilarová	Michael Prostějovský	1972	
Il maestro di violino	Domenico Modugno	1976	Ne, meastro	Jiří Korn & Naďa Konvalinková, Václav Neckář & Helena Růžičková	Zdeněk Borovec	1977, 1979	
Il ragazzo della via Gluck	Adriano Celentano	1966	Závidím	Naďa Urbánková	Jiří Grossmann	1972	
Imbranato	Tiziano Ferro	2002	Vzpomínky dál stárnou	Vláďa Hron	Hron himself	2005	
La Lontananza	Domenico Modugno	1970	Ráno	Waldemar Matuška	Ivo Fischer	1971	
La mia musica	Toto Cutugno	1981	Muzika	Karel Gott	Pavel Kopta	1985	
Lei, lei, lei	Homo Sapiens	1975	Dívčí pláč	Michal David	Jaroslav Machek	1982	
Ma chi te lo fa fare	Marinella	1981	To by tak hrálo	Michaela Linková	Jaroslav Machek	1983	
Maledetta primavera	Loretta Goggi	1981	Moje malá premiéra	Petra Janů	Miroslav Černý	1984	
Malinconia	Riccardo Fogli	1981	Krásnější než růže	Pavel Roth	Vladimír Poštulka	1983	
Malinconia	Riccardo Fogli	1981	Čas nálezů a ztrát	Vojtěch Šmíd	Václav Babula	1984	
Mamma Maria	Ricchi E Poveri	1967	Nic moc	Bezinky	Eduard Pergner	1983	
Mamma Maria	Ricchi E Poveri	1967	Máma má rýmu	Těžkej Pokondr		1999	
Non illuderti mai, My Little Lady	Orietta Berti, Tremeloes	1968	Malá Lady	Václav Neckář	Zdeněk Rytíř	1969	
Non la puoi chiamare vita		1986	Zas tu máme závěr léta	Hana Zagorová	Hana Zagorová	1987	
Perdono	Caterina Caselli	1966	Tak prázdná	Yvonne Přenosilová	Petr Rada	1967	
Samarcanda	Roberto Vecchioni	1977	Kapelo, hraj!	Petr Rezek	Jaroslav Navrátil	1978	
Sará la nostalgia	Sandro Giacobbe	1982	Suverén	Vítězslav Vávra	Miroslav Černý	1984	
Stella stai	Umberto Tozzi	1980	Třetí galaxie	Michal David	Michael Prostějovský	1981	
Strano	written by Adelmo Musso, sung by Anna Rusticano	1983	Ráno	Marcela Holanová	Karel Šíp	1985	
Ti stringero	Nada	1982	Tvý oči lžou	Marcela Holanová	Karel Šíp	1983	
Ti stringero	Nada	1982	Jít tam, kam mě berou	Eva Pilarová	Hana Krütznerová	1984	
Tira e molla	Nuovi Angeli	1971	Budíky	Petr Rezek	Pavel Žák	1973	
Tornero	I Santo California	1975	Vrací se svítání	Milan Černohouz & Eva Králová	Pavel Cmíral	1976	
Tornero	I Santo California	1975	Tornero	Ilona Csáková	Vladimír Kočandrle	1999	
Tornerai, torneró	Homo Sapiens	1975	Líbezná	Michal David	Jaroslav Machek	1981	
Un nuovo amore	Eros Ramazzotti	1986	Tak se mi vtírej	Heidi	Zdeněk Borovec	1987	
Una notte speciale	Alice	1981	Oheň v sobě máš	Karel Gott	Eduard Pergner	1982	
Via	Raf	2001	Zpívám	Vláďa Hron	Hron himself	2005	

== Japanese ==
Original title	Original artist/composer	Original date	Cover title	Cover artist	Cover lyricist	Cover date	Note
Ue o Muite Arukō (上を向いて歩こう, "I Look Up As I Walk", alternatively titled "Sukiyaki")	Composer: Hachidai Nakamura, Lyricist: Rokusuke Ei, sung by Kyu Sakamoto	1961, 1963	Bílá vrána	Josef Zíma	Josef Zíma	1964	

== Neapolitan ==
Original title	Original artist/composer	Original date	Cover title	Cover artist	Cover lyricist	Cover date	Note
Santa Lucia	Teodoro Cottrau	1849	Krásná je Neapol	Waldemar Matuška			

== Portuguese ==
Original title	Original artist	Original date	Cover title	Cover artist	Cover lyricist	Cover date	Note
A sombra e a luz	Karina Battis	2001	eSeMeS	Lucie Bílá	Gábina Osvaldová	2003	

== Slovak ==
Original title	Original artist	Original date	Cover title	Cover artist	Cover lyricist	Cover date	Note
Humoreska (Sedí mucha na stene)	Mikuláš Schneider-Trnavský	1918	Sedí mucha na stěně				
Láska	Marcel Palonder	1991	Láska	Anna K	Jana Leichtová	1992	

== Spanish ==
Original title	Original artist	Original date	Cover title	Cover artist	Cover lyricist	Cover date	Note
Boba niña Nice	Belinda	2003	Měl's mě vůbec rád	Ewa Farna	Glosr Cvrkalová	2006	
Charly	Santabarbara	1974	Charlie Chaplin	Miroslav Dudáček, Zdena Lorencová	Pavel Vrba	1974, 1975	
Donde estan tus ojos negros	Santabarbara	1976	Černé oči máš jen jednou	Miroslav Dudáček	Michal Bukovič	1978	
El chico de la armonica, The Mouth Organ Boy	Micky	1962	Malý přítel z města N	Jaromír Mayer, Jaromír Květener & Karel Černoch	Zdeněk Borovec	1972, ?	
Fin de semana	Los Diablos	1971	Země lásky	Viktor Sodoma	František Ringo Čech	1971	
Guantanamera	Joseíto Fernández	1940	A mi madre (Guajira Guantanamera)	Franta má péra	Wabi Daněk	1999	
Guantanamera	Joseíto Fernández	1940	A mi madre (Guajira Guantanamera)	Jiří Štědroň	Jiří Štědroň	1973	
Guantanamera	Joseíto Fernández	1940	A mi madre (Guajira Guantanamera)	Jan Čech Gevara	Těžkej Pokondr	2003	
La fuerza del amor	Luis Aguilé	1936	Čím dál tím víc	Hana Hegerová	Zdeněk Rytíř	1972	
La la la	Massiel	1968	La la la	Helena Blehárová	Vladimír Fiala	1968	
Mas vale trocar	Juan del Encina		Když zhořkne ti víno	Spiritual kvintet	Dušan Vančura	1992	
No me puedes dejar asi	Luis Miguel	1970	Letní kluci	Hana Zagorová	Hana Zagorová	1985	
Somos Novios	Armando Manzanero	1968	Půjdu za tebou	Karel Gott	Zdeněk Borovec	2013	
Un rayo del sol	Los Diablos	1970	Ráj slunce	Jiří Korn	František Ringo Čech	1971	

== Mexican ==
Original title	Original artist	Original date	Cover title	Cover artist	Cover lyricist	Cover date	Note
La Bamba	Ritchie Valens	1958	La Bamba	Josef Laufer	Josef Laufer	1988	
La Bamba	Ritchie Valens	1958	Kampa	Těžkej Pokondr	Lou Fanánek Hagen	2000	

== Polish ==
Original title	Original artist	Original date	Cover title	Cover artist	Cover lyricist	Cover date	Note
Ballada wagonowa	Maryla Rodowicz (Źyj, mój świecie)	1969	Kůň bílý	Marie Rottrová	Miroslava Černá	1971	
Była to głupia miłość	Czerwone Gitary	1965	Kluk, na kterého můžu dát	Hana Zagorová	Hana Zagorová	1974	
Czas	Ryszard Rynkowski	2000	Čas	Hana Zagorová	Hana Zagorová	2000	
Czerwone Gitary	Krzysztof Dzikowski	1974	Nejkrásnější děšť	Petr Rezek	Karel Vágner	1978	
Grande valse brillante	Ewa Demarczyk	1964	Žena za tvými zády	Hana Zagorová	Hana Zagorová	1991	
Korowód	Marek Grechuta	1971	Chorovod	C&K Vocal	Ladislav Kantor	1975	
Księżniczka	Sylwia Grzeszczak	2013	Rande u Zdi nářků	Hana Zagorová	Václav Kopta	2014	
Małgośka	Maryla Rodowicz	1973	Markétka	Marie Rottrová	Jiřina Fikejzová	1973	
Nie spoczniemy	Czerwone Gitary	1965	To se zvládne	Helena Vondráčková	Jiřina Fikejzová	1978	
Nie spoczniemy	Czerwone Gitary	1965	Kdo ví, proč láska odchází	Petr Čáslavský w\ Kardinálové	Miroslav Černý		
Niech żyje bal	Maryla Rodowicz	1984	Sláva, je bál	Hana Zagorová	Hana Zagorová	1985	
Sing-Sing	Maryla Rodowicz	1976	Song	Jana Kratochvílová	Jiřina Fikejzová	1976	
Święto	Ryszard Rynkowski	2000	To přece není náhodou	Hana Zagorová	Václav Kopta	2000	
Wszystko czego dziś chcę	Izabela Trojanowska	1981	Dívka na inzerát	Michal David	Eva Hurychová	1981	

== Puerto Rican ==
Original title	Original artist	Original date	Cover title	Cover artist	Cover lyricist	Cover date	Note
Che sará	José Feliciano	1971	Nádherná láska	Pavel Novák	Jiří Aplt	1971	
Tale Of Maria	José Feliciano	1972	Jen s ní	Radek Tomášek	Radek Tomášek	1980	

== Romanian ==
Original title	Original artist	Original date	Cover title	Cover artist	Cover lyricist	Cover date	Note
Am visat odata	Corina Chiriac	1975	Taková je láska	Jaromír Mayer & Zuzka Černá	Miloš Dražil	1978	

== Folk songs ==
In case of folk songs it is nearly meaningless trying to determine which version is original and which is a cover.

=== Polish ===
Polish	Czech	Note
Miała baba koguta	Šly panenky silnicí	
Pije Kuba do Jakuba	Nepudu domů	
Górole	Gorale	
Piwka dajcie nam żakom	Tancuj, tancuj, vykrúcaj!	
Hej, bystra woda	Ej, bystrá voda	
Pasła Andzia Pawie	Pásla děvečka páva	
Gorzka wódka	Pec nám spadla	

== Sources ==
- Rádio Blaník: Slavné desky – HEZKY ČESKY list of episodes, (old archive version episodes from 2012, newer archive version episodes from 2013)
