= Rangers – Plavci =

Czech folk country band

Rangers
- Also known as: Plavci
- Origin: Prague, Czechoslovakia
- Genres: Bluegrass; country; folk
- Years active: 1964–present
- Spinoffs: New Rangers; Rangers Band
- Members: Miroslav Řihošek; Iva Hajnová; Max Presser; Karel Macálka; Franta "Goliš" Drápal
- Past members: Milan Dufek; Antonín Hájek; Miroslav Řihošek; Jan Vančura; Jiří Veisser; Radek Tomášek; Jarka Hadrabová; Jiří Hájek; Pavel Fáček; Jiří Haller
- Website: rangers-plavci.cz

Rangers is a Czech folk and country music band formed in 1964 by Milan Dufek and Antonín Hájek. Its classic lineup (1966–1969) also included Miroslav Řihošek, Jan Vančura, Jiří Veisser, Radek Tomášek, and Jarka Hadrabová. In 1971, they changed their name to Plavci, reverting back to their original moniker in 1990. Rangers – Plavci released numerous studio, live, and compilation albums. Dufek died in 2005, and in 2013, the group fractured into several separate ensembles.

== History ==
Formation and lineup stabilization: 1963–1966

Milan Dufek (guitar, flute), Antonín Hájek (double bass), and Pavel Fáček (banjo), all three CTU classmates, had been playing together in a band called Hillbilly Western since 1963. A year later, they renamed themselves Rangers and added Jiří Veisser (violin), Jiří Hájek (drums), and Jiří Haller (guitar). Two more musicians—Miroslav Řihošek (banjo) and Jan Vančura—joined before long, while Fáček departed. Their first performance took place in 1965. The band's lineup solidified in 1966, with the addition of guitarist Radek Tomášek and vocalist Jarka Hadrabová and the departure of Jiří Hájek and Haller.

Victories, initial releases, and name change: 1967–1973

In 1967, Rangers won in the Country & Western category at the inaugural Porta festival, held in Ústí nad Labem, a feat they repeated the following year. In 1968, they released their debut EP, titled Colorado. A year later, Hadrabová left the group to join Spirituál kvintet, and Rangers issued their first LP, The Rangers. They issued two more self-titled albums, and in 1971, the group changed its name to Plavci, as English names were discouraged during the Communist era. Tomášek departed in 1973.

Deaths, departures, and disbandment: 1987–2006

Jan Vančura left the group in 1987, and Antonín Hájek died in 1989. A year later, the group resumed using its original name, Rangers. The band received a Platinum record for the sale of two million units, and the same year, they toured the United States and Canada for the first time. In 1997, they won at the Porto festival for the third time, and they toured Australia. The following year, they received their second Platinum record. Jiří Veisser left Rangers in 1999, and in 2003, Jan Vančura began guesting with the band. In 2005, Milan Dufek died while scuba diving in Colombia. Vančura and Řihošek put together a new band lineup that included Karel Macálka (vocals, guitars), Dušan Reichmann (double bass, vocals), and Iva Hajnová (vocals), and the group launched a tour to commemorate Dufek. Veisser, disassisfied with the new band, started his own group, called New Rangers.

Band split and successors: 2013–present

Vančura left Rangers – Plavci once more in 2013, at which point, the group splintered into two separate ensembles: Rangers and Plavci. Rangers, led by Miroslav Řihošek (banjo, guitar), included Iva Hajnová (vocals), Max Presser (mandolin, violin, harmonica, guitar, vocals), Karel Macálka (guitars, vocals), and Franta "Goliš" Drápal (double bass, vocals). Plavci, fronted by Vančura (vocals, guitar), included Mário Bihári (vocals, clarinet, accordion, piano), Jakub Racek (guitar, vocals), and Lukáš Pelc (double bass). Another ensemble, consisting of several former members of Rangers – Plavci, began playing as Rangers Band. It includes Jiří Kaleš (guitar, vocals), Jan Podjukl (bass guitar, vocals), Luboš Řehák (drums, vocals), Mirek Čamaj (guitar, vocals), and Martin Černý (banjo, vocals);

== Band members ==
Classic lineup (1966–1969)

- Milan Dufek – guitar, flute
- Antonín Hájek – double bass
- Miroslav Řihošek – banjo, guitar
- Jan Vančura – guitar, vocals
- Jiří Veisser – violin
- Radek Tomášek – guitar
- Jarka Hadrabová – vocals

Rangers

- Miroslav Řihošek – banjo, guitar
- Iva Hajnová – vocals
- Max Presser – mandolin, violin, harmonica, guitar, vocals
- Karel Macálka – guitars, vocals
- Franta "Goliš" Drápal – double bass, vocals

Plavci

- Jan Vančura – vocals, guitar
- Mário Bihári – clarinet, accordion, piano, vocals
- Jakub Racek – guitar, vocals
- Lukáš Pelc – double bass

== Selected discography ==
Studio albums

- The Rangers (1969)
- Rangers 1970 (1970)
- Rangers (1971)
- Plavci (1973)
- Plavci (1974)
- Sláva (1975)
- Country Our Way (1975)
- Chvála písni (1977)
- On the Country Road (1980)
- Otvíráme plovárnu (1980)
- Galaportrét (compilation, 1984)
- Erb toulavého rodu (1984)
- Výzkumný ústav vodních radostí (1986)
- ...Nejde zapomenout (1991)
- Druhá míza (1992)
- Stalo se na západě (1996)
- Třetí zuby (1999)
- Na cestách (2000)
- 2016 (2016)

EPs

- Colorado (1968)

Live albums

- Rangers v divadle E.F.B. (1970)
- Plavci na Poříčí (1978)
- Live 1970/1971 (2008)
