= Těžkej Pokondr =

Czech musical comedy duo

- Origin: Prague, Czech Republic
- Genres: Comedy pop
- Years active: 1995–2019
- Label: Sony BMG
- Past members: Miloš Pokorný; Roman Ondráček
- Website: pokondr.cz

Těžkej Pokondr was a Czech comedy band consisting of Miloš Pokorný and Roman Ondráček. Pokondr is a portmanteau of their surnames and was proposed to them by Ondřej Hejma. The duo was known for their humorous cover versions of popular local and international pop hits as well as original songs intended to parody well-known topics. An example of this was the song "Prejs to čmajz" (lit. 'they say you stole it'), which references the "Chile pen incident", in which former Czech president Václav Klaus was caught on video stealing a pen during a state visit to Chile in 2011.

In 2010, the duo began hosting a radio show called Den začíná v osm on the private channel Frekvence 1. After seven years, on 31 October 2017, they cancelled the show due to a disagreement with their supervisor Miroslav Škoda, who did not allow them to invite the investigative journalist Jaroslav Kmenta before the legislative election. According to some sources, this was part of an ongoing long-term dispute that the band considered to be censorship.

Těžkej Pokondr split up in 2019.

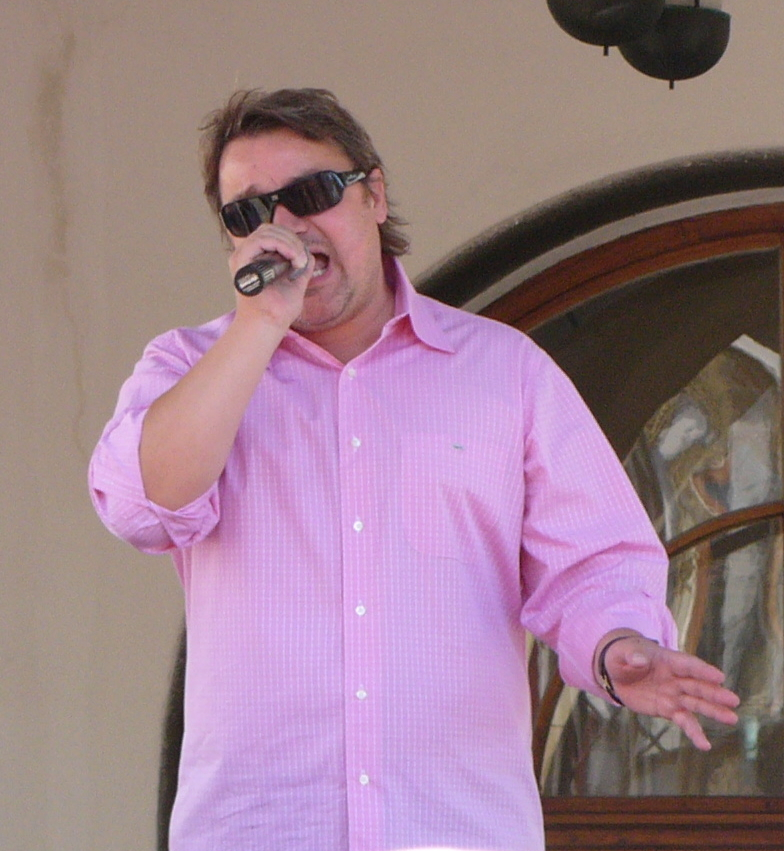
Miloš Pokorný in 2008

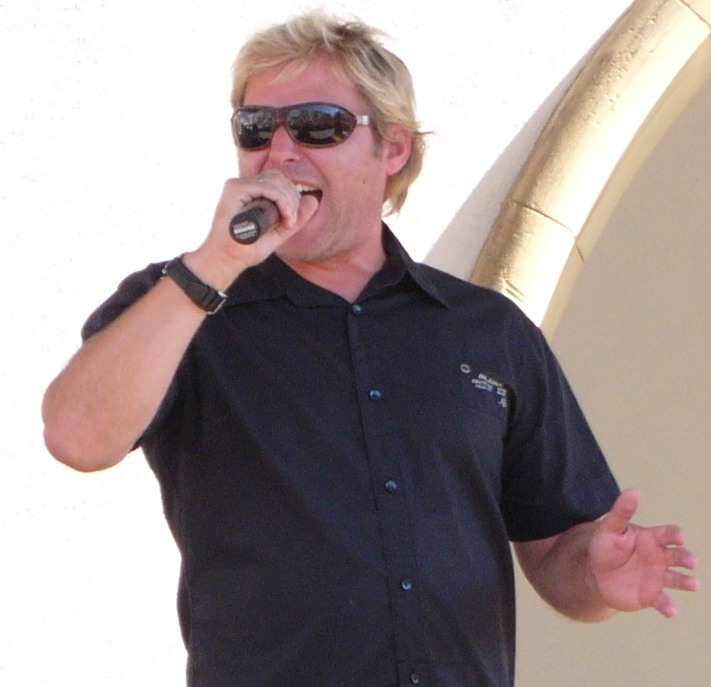
Roman Ondráček in 2008

== Discography ==
Studio albums

- Sbohem Tvá Máňa (1996)
- Víc než Gottzila (1998)
- Vypusťte Krakena (1999)
- Ježek v peci (2000)
- Jéžišmarjá (2001)
- Kuss (2003)
- Safírový Jadel (2005)
- Superalbum (2011)
- Star Boys (2017)

Compilations

- Super Těžkej Pokondr (1999)
- Best of: 20 Největších Hitů (2008)
- 14 nejhorších kousků (2013)
- Best of II. (2014)

Bootlegs

- Zakázané uvolnění (1998)

DVDs

- Tucatero aneb po práci legraci! (2003 documentary)
