= Raising My Family =

1980 single by Steve Kekana

Single by Steve Kekana
- B-side: "Working Man"
- Released: 1980
- Genre: Reggae
- Length: 3:53
- Label: EMI
- Songwriter(s): Mally Watson; Tom Vuma
- Producer(s): Mally Watson; Tom Vuma

"Raising My Family" is a song by South African singer Steve Kekana that was released as a non-album single in 1980. The song was co-written and produced by Mally Watson and Tom Vuma. The song reached the top 10 in Sweden, peaking at No. 3 in October 1981, and remained on the chart for seven weeks. It also reached the top 10 in Switzerland and Austria, peaking at No. 7 and No. 3, respectively.

== Track listing and formats ==
- South African 7-inch single

A. "Raising My Family" – 3:53
B. "Working Man" – 3:42

== Charts ==
Weekly chart performance for "Raising My Family"
Chart (1981–1983)	Peak position
Austria (Ö3 Austria Top 40)	3
Finland (Suomen virallinen lista)	1
Sweden (Sverigetopplistan)	3
Switzerland (Schweizer Hitparade)	7
