= Marie Rottrová =

Czech actress, presenter, singer, composer and lyricist

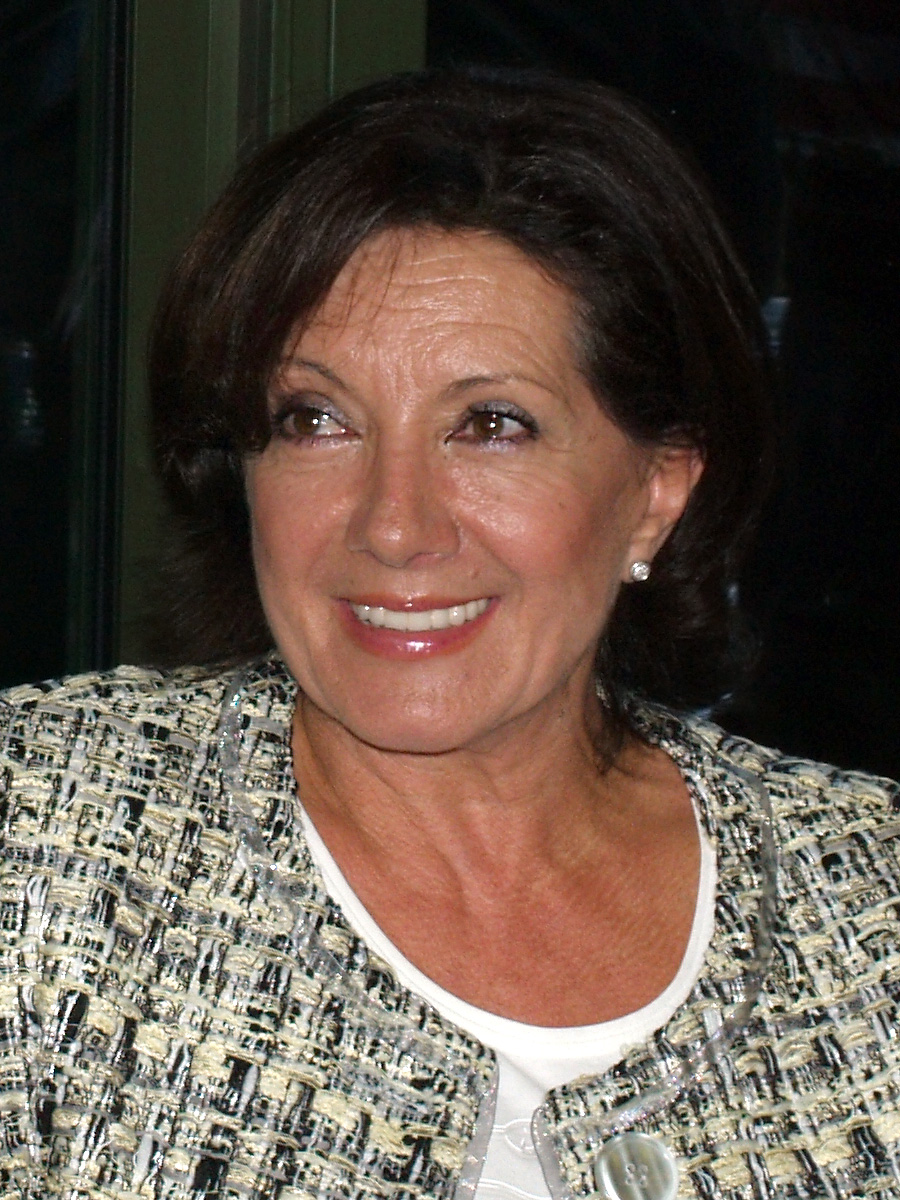
Rottrová in 2009

Marie Rottrová (born 13 November 1941) is a Czech singer, pianist, composer and lyricist. She performed the songs "Kůň bílý" and "Markétka", which are Czech versions of songs by Maryla Rodowicz.

== Life ==
She was born on 13 November 1941 in Hrušov district of Ostrava. She was born into a family of musicians; her father was an organist and her mother a singer. In her youth, she studied singing and piano.

After graduating from high school in Ostrava, she reached the finals of a local talent competition. Initially, she sang with the local rhythm and blues band Majestic.

== Career ==
From March 1969, she was a permanent member of the band Flamingo.

In 1973, she came third in the Zlatý slavík (Golden Nightingale) poll. In 1981, she became famous for the pop hit "Lásko, voníš deštěm" (You Smell of Rain, My Love) with lyrics by Jaromír Nohavica, a cover version of Black Sabbath's song She's Gone.

In 2024, she was awarded the Medal of Merit, First Class.

== Discography ==
- Flamingo (Supraphon 1970, reissue, Bonton 1996);
- This Is Our Soul (Supraphon/Artia 1971);
- Marie Rottrová (Supraphon 1972);
- Plameňáci a Marie Rottrová 75 (Supraphon 1976);
- Pěšky po dálnici (Supraphon 1977);
- Rhythm And Romance (Supraphon/Artia 1977);
- Ty, kdo jdeš kolem (Supraphon 1980);
- Muž č. 1 (Supraphon 1981);
- Marie Rottrová vypravuje pohádky Františka Nepila (Supraphon 1982);
- Já a ty (Supraphon 1983);
- 12 x Marie Rottrová (Supraphon 1985);
- Mezi námi (Supraphon 1986);
- Marie & spol. (Supraphon 1987);
- Divadélko pod věží (Supraphon 1988);
- Soul Feelings (Supraphon 1988);
- Důvěrnosti (Supraphon 1989);
- Chvíli můj, chvíli svůj (Monitor 1993);
- Jeřabiny (B & M Music 1995);
- Neberte nám princeznú (soundtrack, BMG 2001);
- Ty, kdo jdeš kolem (compilation, Sony Music Bonton 2001);
- Podívej (BMG 2001);
- Všechno nejlepší... (compilation, Supraphon 2003).

=== Videography ===
- Tisíc tváří lásky – DVD album, Supraphon, 2008

== Bibliography ==
- Dana Čermáková, Translator: Joanna Grzeszek, 'Jaromir Nohavica. Zanim kitę odwalę. Biografia barda.' [Before I Kick the Bucket. A Bard's Biography]. ISBN 978-83-7887-137-8
