= Steve Kekana =

South African singer songwriter (1958–2021)

- Born: Tebogo Steve Kekana; 4 August 1958; Zebediela, Transvaal, South Africa
- Origin: Zebediela, Transvaal, South Africa
- Died: 1 July 2021 (aged 62) Johannesburg, South Africa
- Genres: Mbaqanga, Soul, Pop, R&B, Jazz
- Occupation: Singer-songwriter
- Instrument: Vocals
- Years active: 1977–2021
- Labels: Impangela Music

Tebogo Steve Kekana (4 August 1958 – 1 July 2021) was a South African singer and songwriter. He began his musical career in the 1980s. He attended and completed his studies at UNISA.

== Life and career ==
Kekana was born in Zebediela, Transvaal. He lost his sight at the age of five, and attended a school for the blind in Pietersburg. During his school years, he developed a love for singing, and became a member of amateur groups during the teenage years.

In 1979 and 1980, Kekana won what was then known as the SABC Black Music Award for best male vocalist. Kekana's "Raising My Family" was a big hit in Europe in 1980. In total, Kekana had recorded more than forty albums. His songs "The Bushman" and "Feel So Strong" (featuring Hotline) were hits on the Springbok Radio Chart (the semi-official South African chart of the time) reaching number 13 and number 6 in 1982 and 1983 respectively.

He worked with the likes of Ray Phiri, Nana Coyote, Joe Nina and Hotline featuring PJ Thandeka Powers.

Steve Kekana was a university graduate with B Juris and LLB degrees. He was an Advocate and a lecturer in Labour Law at the University of South Africa.

Kekana died from COVID-19-related complications on 1 July 2021, at the age of 62.

== Awards and honours ==
Period	Honour / Award
1978-2021	Received more than 70 Golden Disc Awards
1980	The Best Male Vocalist Award (Radio Zulu)
1984	The Four Outstanding Young South African (FOYSA) Award
1985	The Ten Outstanding Young People of the World (TOYP) Award
1986	The OKTV award
2010	Mama Bheka Community Awards
2018	SAMA Lifetime Achievement Award (SAMA 24)

== Discography ==
=== Albums ===
Year	Title	Label (original issue)
1977	Steve Kekana	His Master's Voice
1979	Nomsa Ntombi Yami	His Master's Voice
1979	Mokhotse Oa Hao	EMI
1980	Umenziwa Akakhalelwa	EMI
1980	Iphupho	EMI
1980	Thapelo	EMI
1981	Isiko Lwabe Suthu	Bullet
1981	Raising My Family	EMI
1981	Kodua Ea Maseru	EMI
1982	Ifuqe Mntanami (Push)	Steve Kekana
1982	No Going Back	CCP Record Company
1982	Hare Khumameng	Gallo Record Company
1982	Amandla Amasha	Gallo Record Company
1983	Alone in The Desert	Steve Records
1984	Yintle Lento	Steve Records
1985	Third Time Lucky	CBS / Steve Records
1986	Ngiyadlisa	Steve Kekana
1985	Siwelele	Gallo Record Company
1986	Love Triangle	Steve Kekana
1986	Bull Dozer	Steve Kekana
1987	Sebabatso	Steve Kekana
1987	Lindani	Gallo Record Company
1988	Makhombo	Steve Kekana
1988	I Shall Be Released	EMI
1989	Faith, Love and Respect	EMI
1996	Usafira	Cool Spot Productions
2001	Icilongo	Cool Spot Music
2003	African Lady	Sony Music
2009	Ha Ke Le Tje	EMI / CCP Record Company
2009	Isithombe Sami	EMI / CCP Record Company
2014	Risen	Next Music
2018	Ubuntu	Sold Out Music

=== Compilations ===
Year	Title	Label (original issue)
1997	Golden Hits Vol 1	Cool Spot Music
1997	Golden Hits Vol 2	Cool Spot Music
1999	The English Album	Gallo Record Company
1999	The Best of Steve Kekana (Sotho)	EMI
2002	The Best of Steve Kekana (Zulu)	EMI
2011	SA Great Performers	Gallo Record Company
2015	Greatest Moments	Gallo Record Company
2013	Colours of Africa	Gallo Record Company

=== Singles and EPs ===
Year	Title	Label (original issue)
1978	Mamsy / Bolova	His Master's Voice
1978	Rosemary / Sweet Jane	His Master's Voice
1978	Themba	His Master's Voice
1979	Nomsa Ntombi Yami	His Master's Voice
1979	Aka Zenzanga (U Mary) / Uqhoka Amasudi	His Master's Voice

== Biography ==
- By Sydney Fetsie Maluleke (2019); Foreword by Max Mojapelo Steve Kekana: The I In Me, Protea Book House ISBN 978-0-639-81470-4
