= Spirituál kvintet =

Czech folk band

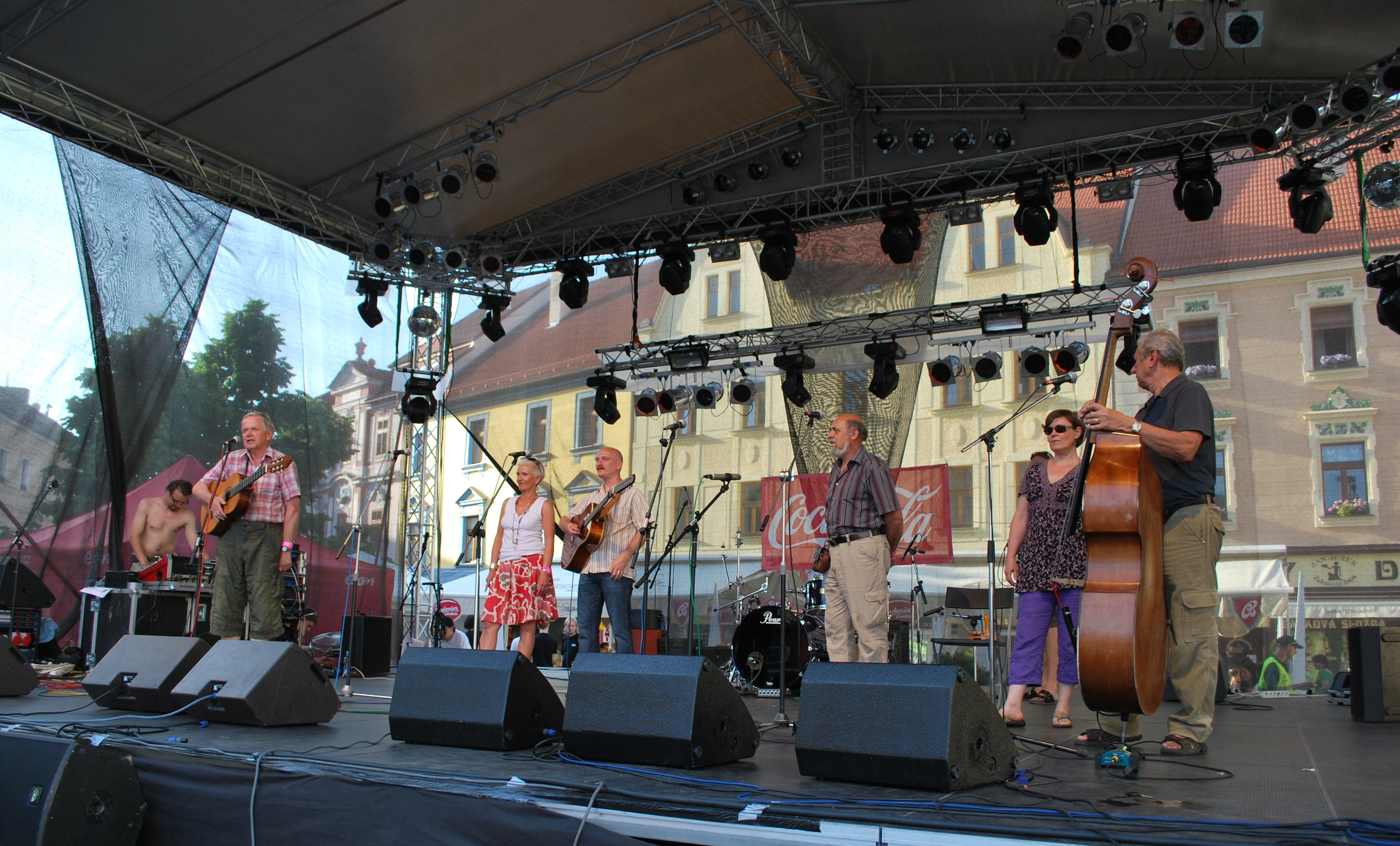
Spirituál kvintet during a performance in Písek (2010)

Spirituál kvintet was a Czech folk band formed in 1960 by Jiří Tichota and others. The band's relevance in Czech culture can be compared to the popular folk band the Weavers in the US. They are widely considered one of the best and most important Czech folk bands.

Their album Šlapej dál (1985) sold more than 130,000 copies.

== Members ==
Member Dušan Vančura died in April 2020.

== Discography ==
- Písničky z roku raz dva (1973)
- Spirituály a balady (1978)
- Saužení lásky (1981)
- 20 let (1984)
- Šlapej dál (1985)
- Every Time I Feel The Spirit (1986)
- Šibeničky (1988)
- Za svou pravdou stát (1990)
- Hallelu (1991)
- Rajská zahrada (1992)
- Antologie 1960-1995 (1994)
- Hanba nám! (1994)
- Na káře (1997)
- Vánoční koncert (1998)
- Křídla holubic (2002)
- Karel Zich a Spirituál kvintet (2004)
- Křížem krážem (2005)
- 45 let archiv (2006)
