= Prague–Prčice March =

Long-distance hiking event in the Czech Republic

Prague–Prčice March Pochod Praha–Prčice
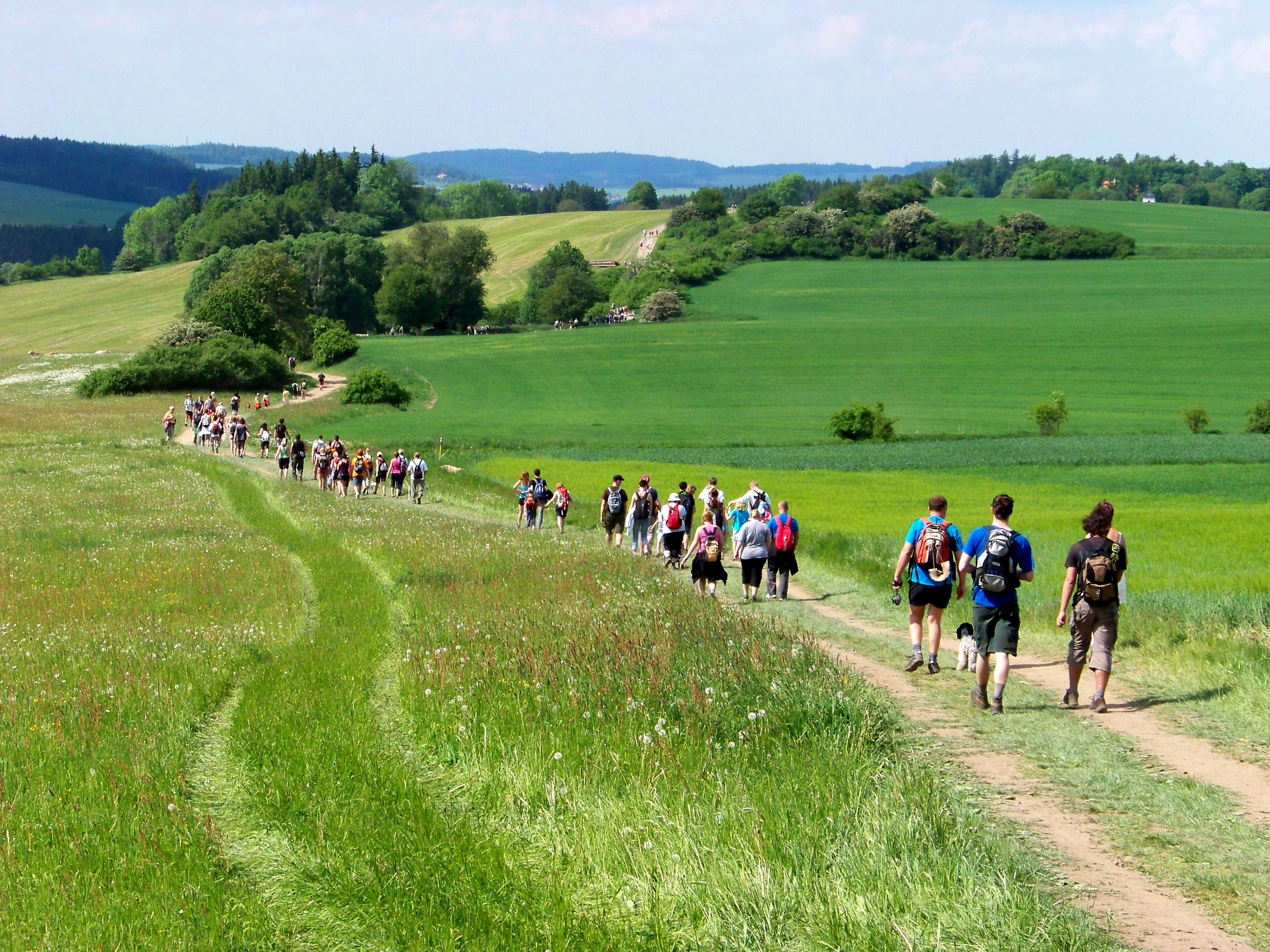
- Typical scenery of the march
- Status: Active
- Genre: Long-distance march
- Frequency: Annually
- Country: Czech Republic
- Inaugurated: 17 April 1966; 60 years ago
- Founders: Jiří Dvořák, Karel Kulle, Stanislav Rataj
- Most recent: 17 May 2025; 17 months ago
- Next event: 16 May 2026; 5 months ago
- Participants: 24,538 (2025)
- Organiser: Czech Tourist Club (KČT)
- Website: praha-prcice.cz

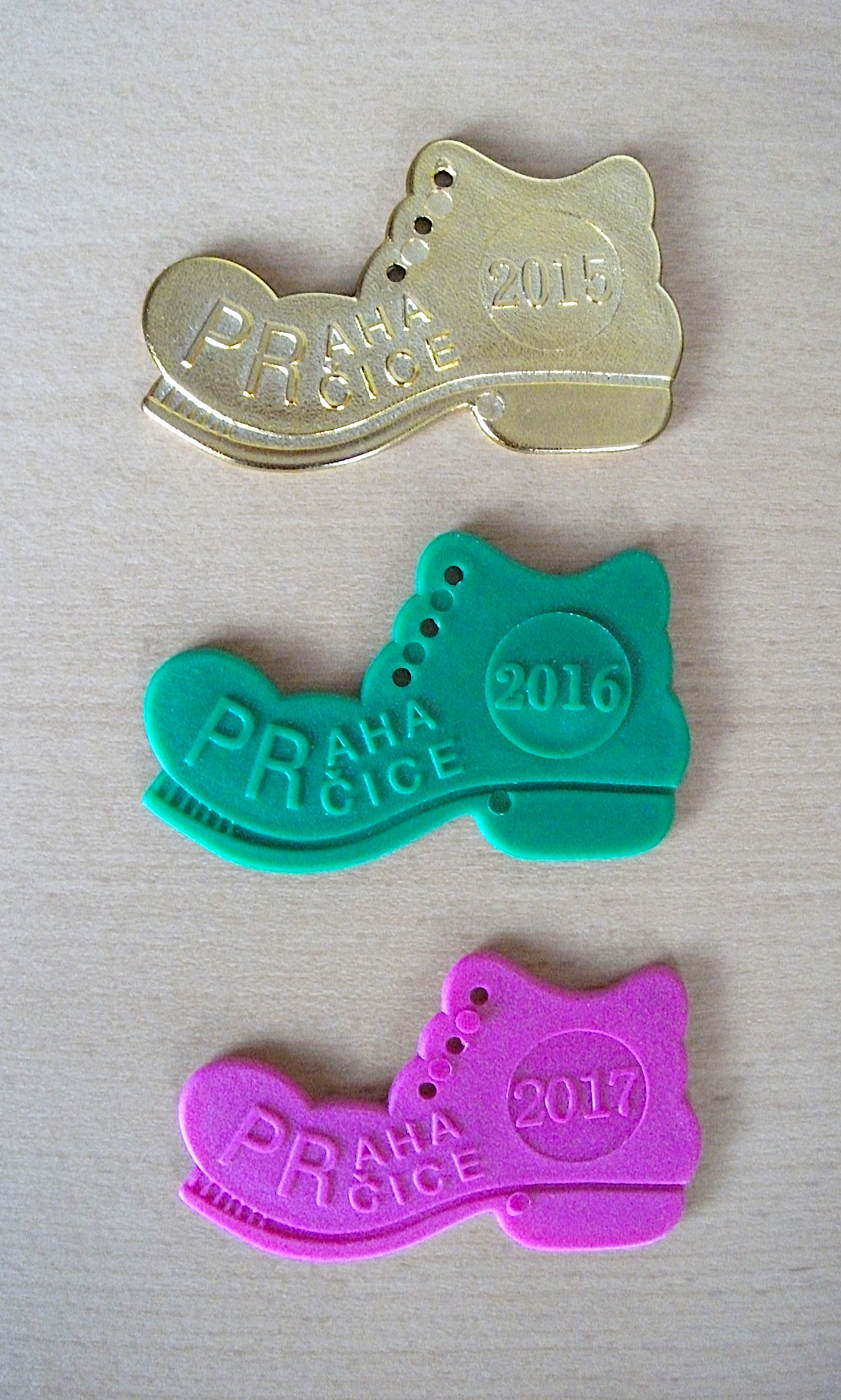
Finisher trophies in 2015–2017

The Prague–Prčice March (Czech: Pochod Praha–Prčice) is an organized long-distance hiking event in the Czech Republic. Held annually since 1966, traditionally on the third Saturday in May, it leads participants to the town of Sedlec-Prčice in Central Bohemia. The event is organized by the Czech Tourist Club (KČT) and attracts around 20,000 participants each year. It is named after its longest and most demanding route, a 70+ km (about 45 miles) course starting in Prague, traditionally regarded as the march's "blue-ribbon" route.

Participants collect stamps at checkpoints along the marked routes. All finishers receive a small plastic boot, the traditional finisher's trophy, issued annually in a surprise color. Finishers of the longest route additionally receive a special souvenir certifying completion of the full 70 km journey from Prague to Prčice.

== History ==
In the 1960s, sports enthusiasts in Czechoslovakia, inspired by events such as the International Four Days Marches in Nijmegen and similar events in France, Belgium, and Switzerland, started organizing "extreme" 100 km (and longer) marches to be completed within 24 hours. In 1966, Jiří Dvořák, Karel Kulle, and Stanislav Rataj decided to organize a similar event, but with a shorter distance that could be completed entirely in daylight. Sedlec-Prčice, at a suitable distance from Prague and the hometown of Stanislav Rataj, was chosen as the destination.

Starting from humble beginnings in the 1960s, the popularity of the march grew rapidly during the 1970s, attracting over 35,000 participants in 1979, 1980, and 1981. After a brief decline in the early 1990s following the political changes of 1989, attendance stabilized at around 20,000 annually. The event was cancelled for the first time in its history in 2020 and again in 2021 due to the COVID-19 pandemic. Since 2022, advance online registration has been mandatory, with registration typically opening at the beginning of May.

== Routes ==
Originally starting from a single route in Prague, the march gradually expanded to over twenty routes of varying lengths, with starting points in multiple towns across Central Bohemia, including Tábor, Benešov, Votice, and others. Hiking routes for adults range from 30 to 70 km in length. In addition, the march includes a 23 km hiking route intended primarily for children (accompanied by adults), as well as dedicated routes for wheelchair users and cyclists. The march is designed as a single-day event, with all routes, including the longest 70 km route from Prague, intended to be completed within one day; all routes start in the morning, and the finish in Prčice officially closes at 8:00 p.m.

== Organization ==
The event is organized by the Czech Tourist Club and its various chapters. It relies heavily on volunteer work: volunteers mark the routes, set up checkpoints and signs, and clean up after the march. It is also supported by special transportation services, including additional trains and buses, as well as a special discounted all-day train ticket available to participants, issued by České dráhy.

== Cultural status ==
The event has become a cultural phenomenon in Czech society, occasionally attracting public figures and politicians such as former president Václav Klaus, although organizers distance themselves from any political use of the event. The march has also been featured in Czech popular culture, notably in the 1976 song "Praha-Prčice" by the Banjo Band of Ivan Mládek.

== Long-distance hiking in the Czech Republic ==
The Prague–Prčice March is part of a broader Czech tradition of long-distance marches that began in the 1960s. (Note: In 1965, at the first meeting of organizers of long-distance marches in Czechoslovakia, it was decided that any march of 50 km or longer would be officially considered a "long-distance march". Hardliners had argued that only marches of 100 km or longer should count, but they were outvoted.) Many similar events are held across the country each year, some with long-standing histories. Some marches feature routes of varying lengths for a broad spectrum of participants, including families with small children (e.g., the Přes tři hrady march), while others are endurance events aimed at trained athletes, such as the 100 km Krakonošova stovka, which border on ultra-trail or ultra-marathon events and sometimes allow both hikers and runners. A distinctive feature of true hiking marches, unlike ultra-trail races, is that they are non-competitive: participants' times are not officially measured, and no official standings or rankings are recorded, emphasizing the experience and personal challenge rather than racing against others. This more casual atmosphere makes them suitable for families and recreational hikers, although longer routes, such as the 70 km Prague–Prčice course, still pose a challenge even for experienced hikers.

== Gallery ==
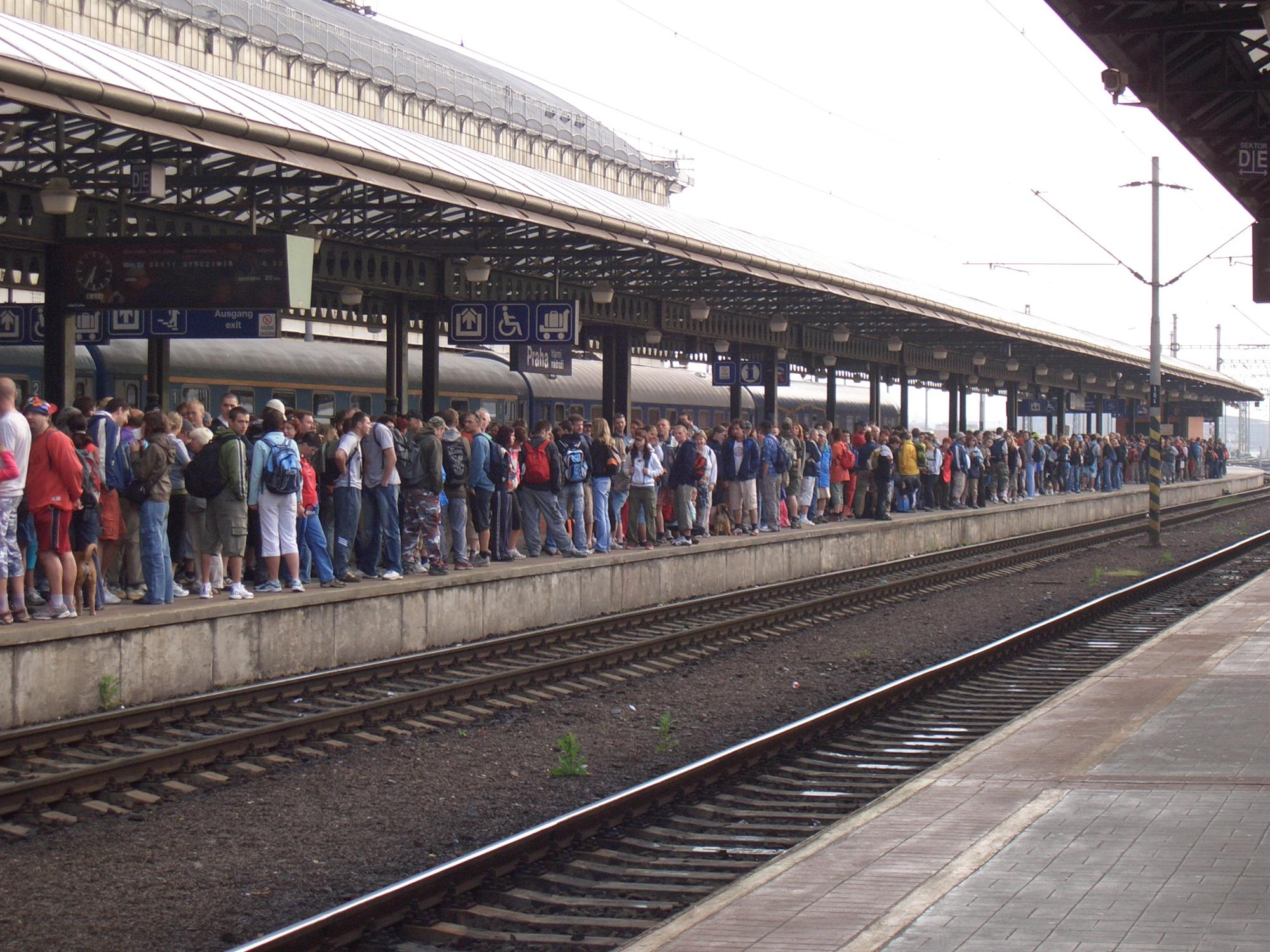
Morning mass departure of hikers from Prague Main Station (2008)

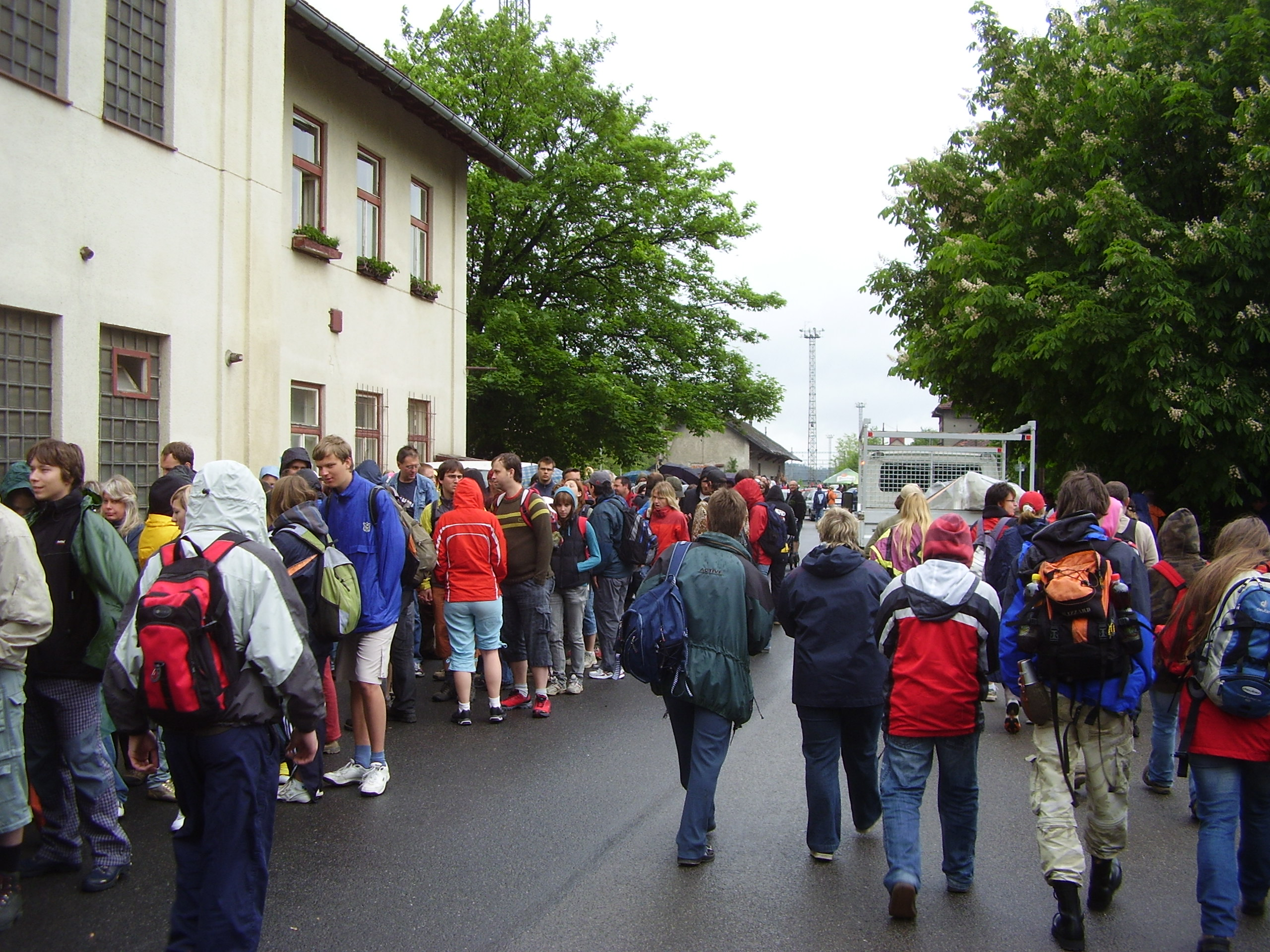
Queue at the Olbramovice registration point (2009)

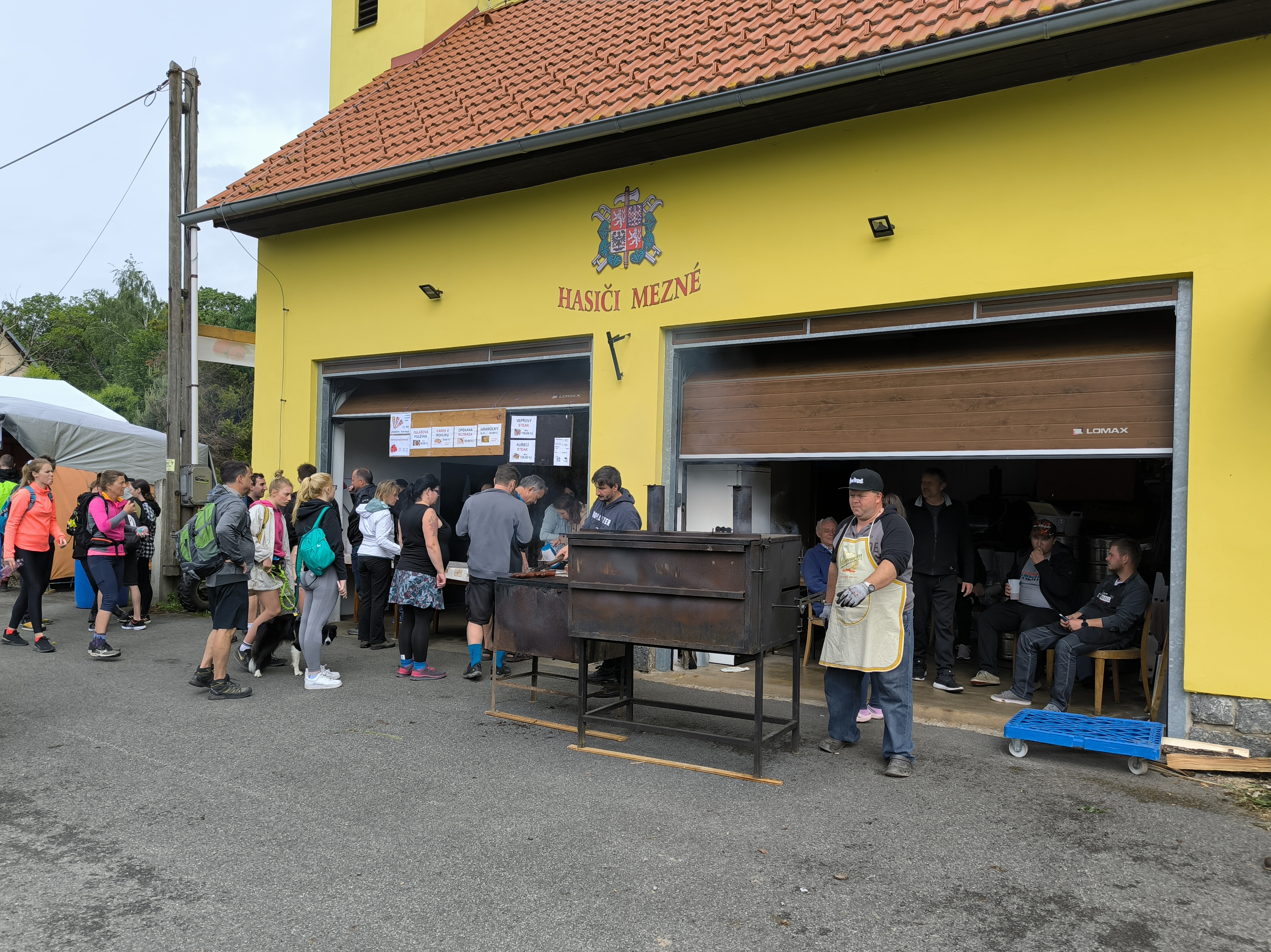
Refreshment stop at Mezné fire station (2024)

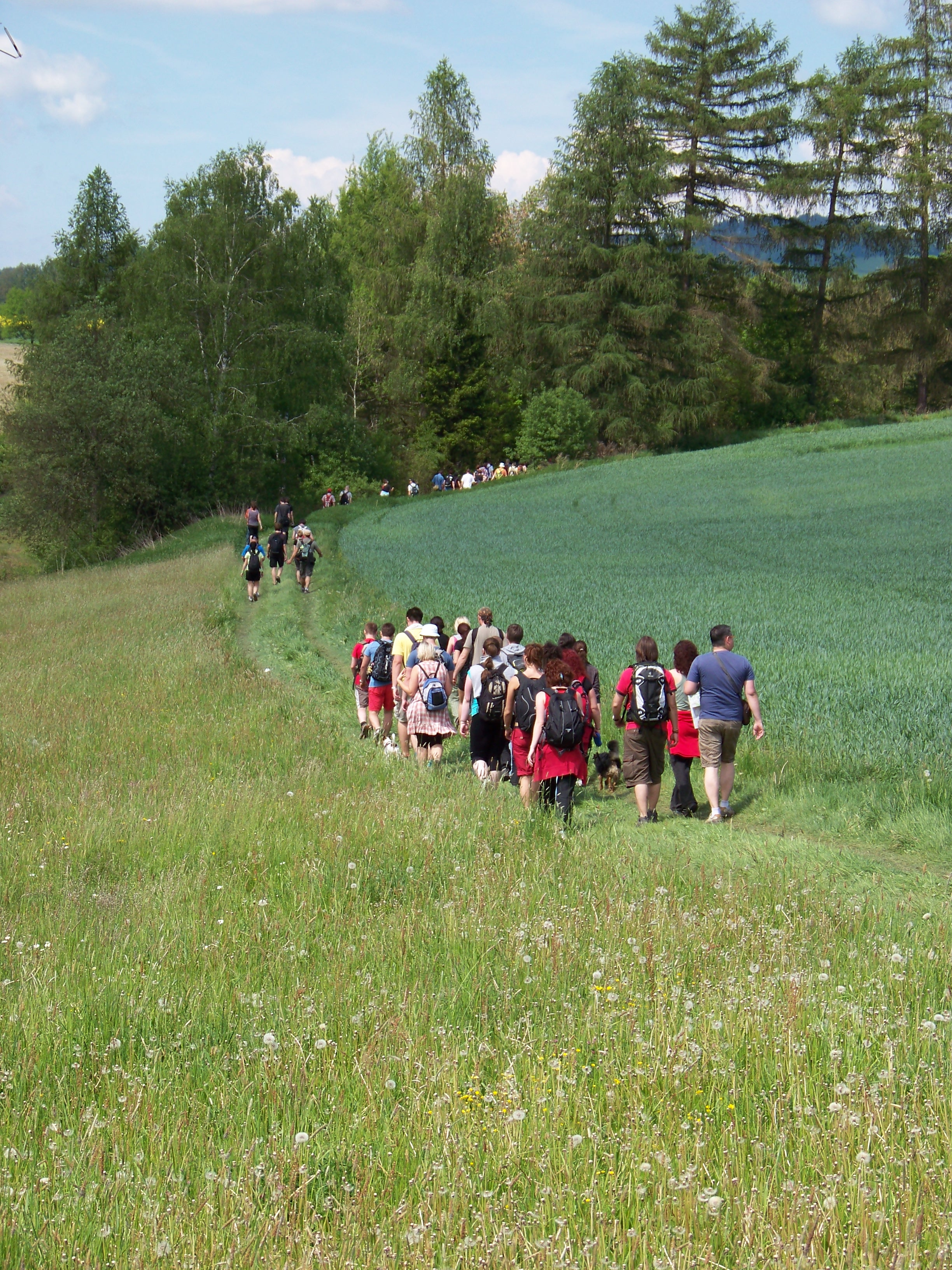
Hikers between Chotoviny and Borotín (2011)

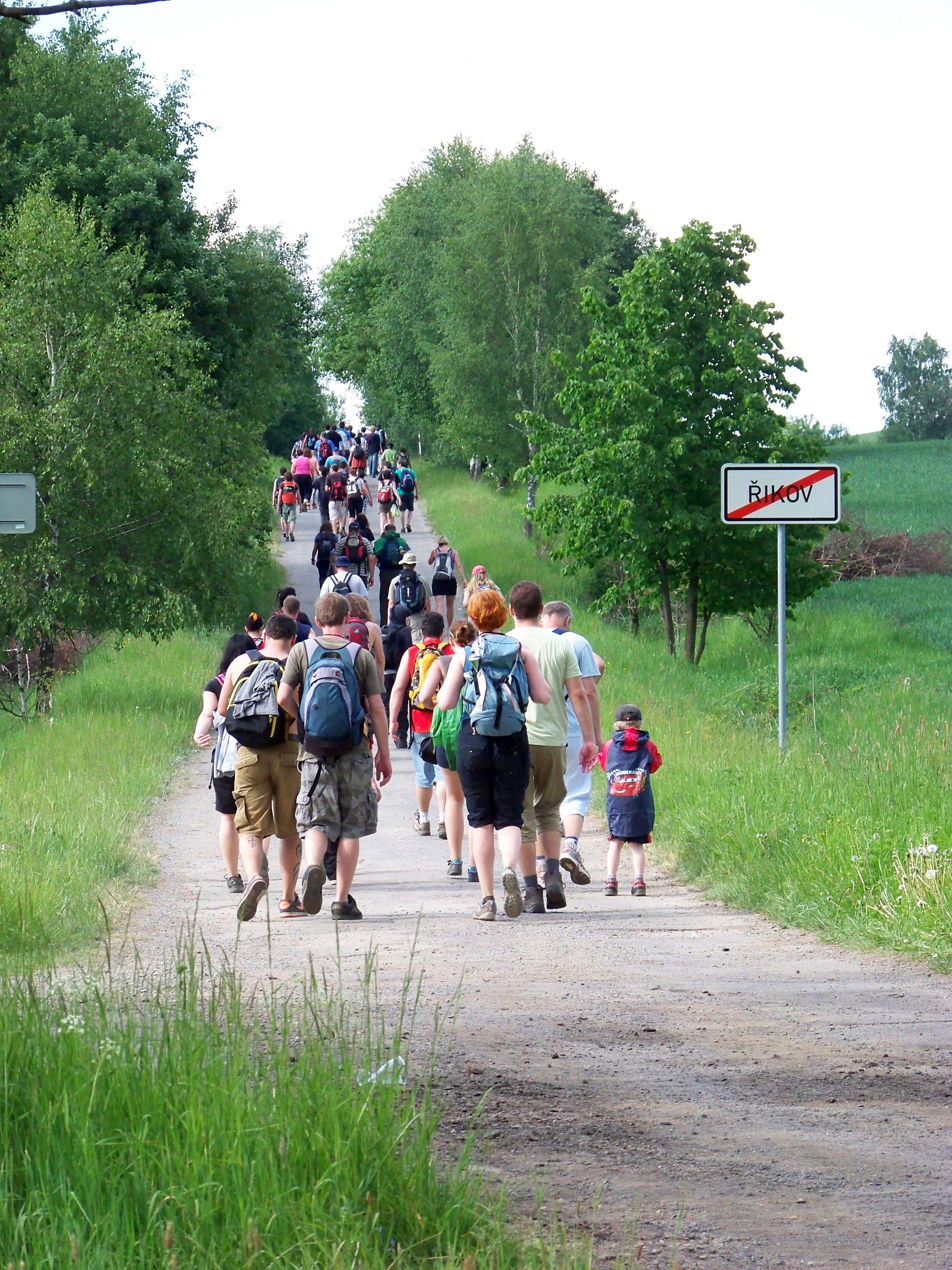
Hikers leaving Řikov (2011)

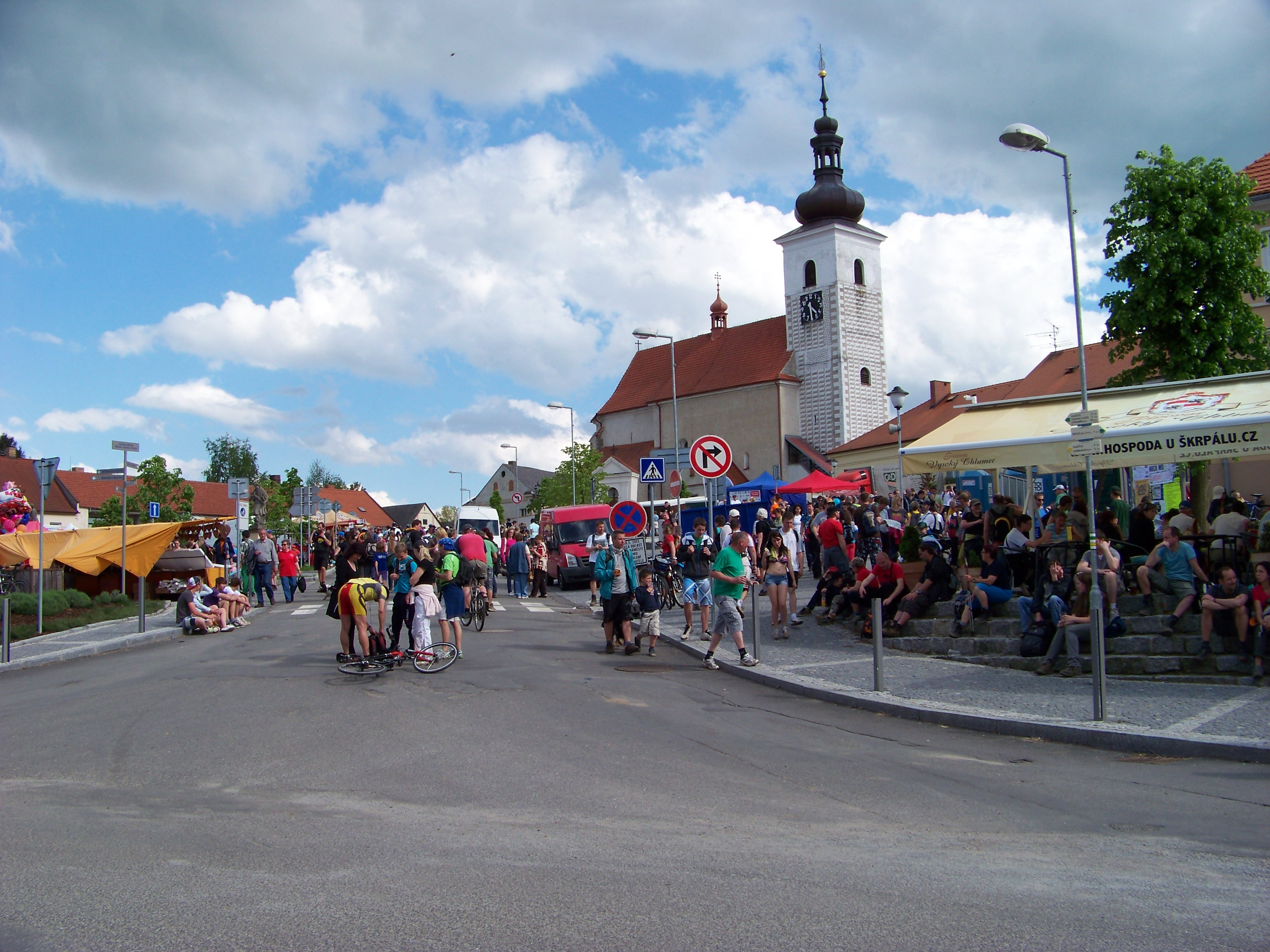
Prčice town square on march day (2013)
