= Emeria Wilujeng Amir Siregar =

Indonesian diplomat (born 1957)

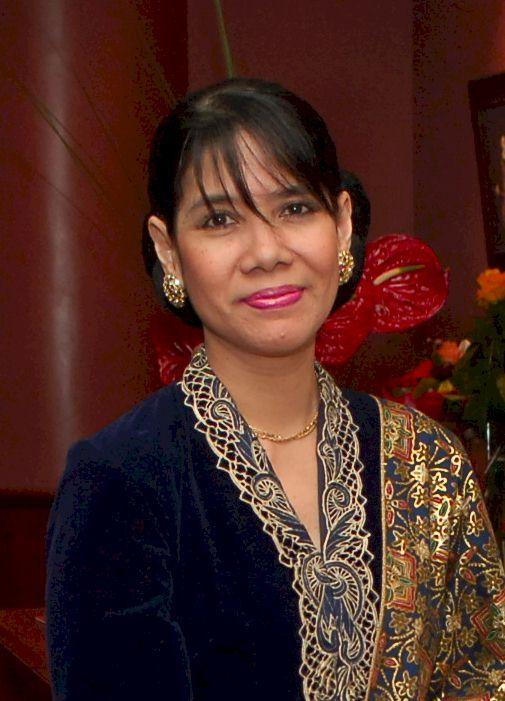

Ambassador of Indonesia to the Czech Republic
- In office 10 August 2010 – 2014
- President: Susilo Bambang Yudhoyono
- Preceded by: Salim Said
- Succeeded by: Aulia Aman Rachman

Personal details
- Born: 27 December 1957 (age 68) Surabaya, Indonesia
- Children: 1
- Education: University of Indonesia (Dra.)
- Nickname: Adjeng

Emeria Wilujeng Amir Siregar (born 27 December 1957) is an Indonesian retired diplomat who served as ambassador to the Czech Republic from 2010 to 2014. Prior to this appointment, she held the position of director of Central and Eastern Europe at the ministry's directorate general of America and Europe. After serving her ambassadorial tenure, Emeria became the chief of international cooperation bureau within the transport ministry.

== Early life and education ==
Born in Surabaya on 27 December 1957, Emeria is the daughter of two physicians and is of East Javanese-Batak heritage. Emeria was more known with the nickname "Adjeng". She studied politics with a specialization on international relations at the University of Indonesia, where she graduated in 1983 with a dissertation on the development of Eurocommunism in Italy and France.

== Diplomatic career ==
Emeria joined the foreign department in 1984 and completed basic diplomatic training the year after. From 1989 to 1994, Emeria was assigned to the embassy in Beograd, where she oversaw the final years of the Yugoslavia and its subsequent transition to Serbia and Montenegro. Emeria served as the head of the West Europe III section within the directorate of Europe starting in 1993. Her career then took her to Canada, where she was assigned to handle economic affairs at the embassy in Ottawa with the rank of second secretary from 1996 to 1999. Following her return, she became the head of the reporting section of the secretariat of the directorate general of Asia Pacific and Africa, a role she held from 2000 to 2003. During this period, she finished mid-level and senior diplomatic training in 2000 and 2002, respectively. She returned to Europe with her appointment to the political section of the embassy in Bratislava, Slovak Republic, with the rank of counsellor on 30 November 2003. Following the departure of ambassador Bintang P. Simorangkir, she became the embassy's chargé d'affaires ad interim from 1 December 2005 to 21 November 2006.

On 24 November 2006, Emeria was appointed director of Central and Eastern Europe, a position she held until 2010. This role, which covered 18 nations, was informed by her previous posting in Central Europe nations. As director, she noted significant challenges, including a lack of awareness in Indonesia about the region, such as the fact that many CEE nations were now European Union members, and the persistence of outdated data referring to dissolved states like Czechoslovakia and Yugoslavia. She highlighted difficulties such as geographical distance and language barriers, but worked to promote the region as a promising non-traditional market by leveraging historical ties from Indonesia's Old Order era. In this capacity, Emeria also led numerous Indonesian delegations in negotiating agreements on economic cooperation, trade, investment protection, and visa-free travel with countries including Georgia, Russia, Slovakia, the Czech Republic, and Serbia. She was also a member of delegations for high-level state visits and bilateral consultations with a wide array of nations in the region.

Emeria was sworn in as ambassador to the Czech Republic on 10 August 2010. She introduced herself to the Indonesian community in the Czech Republic on 10 October 2010 and presented her credentials to the President of the Czech Republic Václav Klaus on 16 November 2010. She described the posting as a "return to habitat" due to her extensive prior experience in the region. One of her key missions was to organize a state visit by Václav Klaus to Indonesia and to facilitate a visit by former president Václav Havel. She personally initiated contact with Havel, successfully arranging an exclusive interview for the Kompas newspaper, which she used to help foster Havel's interest in visiting Indonesia. A strong advocate for public diplomacy, Emeria emphasized the importance of media cooperation and provided extensive access to journalists to cover Indonesian activities and interests in the Czech Republic. In 2011, she held an Indonesian Day promotion to introduce Czech to Indonesian cuisine and art at a ski resort in Sedlec-Prčice, which was described as unusual.

Emeria became the chief of the transport ministry's foreign cooperation bureau on 5 January 2016, serving until 2017. During the Eid season in mid-2016, Emeria became the head of the daily post for Eid transportation, where she oversee and ensure the safety of Eid transportation operations during her shift. From 2017 until her retirement in January 2023, she was assigned to the first American directorate, and later the second American directorate, where she became a senior advisor for economic cooperation between Indonesia and the Caribbean.

== Personal life ==
Emeria is a divorcee and has a daughter.
