= Jožin z bažin =

1977 song by Banjo Band

Single by Banjo Band

from the album Nashledanou!
- B-side: "Ušní Příhoda"
- Released: 1977
- Recorded: 1977
- Genre: Czech bluegrass
- Label: Panton
- Songwriter: Ivan Mládek

Banjo Band singles chronology
"Dáša Jedla Cukroví" (1976)	"Jožin z bažin" (1977)	"V Motelu V Motole" (1977)

Jožin z bažin is a song written by Czech musician and comedian Ivan Mládek and recorded by his group, Banjo Band, for their 1977 album, Nashledanou! It is considered the band's best-known song, both at home and internationally.

In January 2008, the clip of the song unexpectedly became popular in Poland, winning several radio hit lists, and the band recorded a Polish version on their album Jozin z bazin w Polsce, released the same year. It was also popular in Hungary, Austria, and Russia.

== Story ==
The song is a parody of medieval tales, where a brave knight rescues a kingdom terrorized by a monster and as a reward marries the princess, with half the kingdom in dowry.

A man driving a Škoda 100 takes a shortcut through the Czech region of Moravia, which is being terrorized by a monster named Jožin z bažin (Joey from the swamps), who mainly eats people from Prague. In a village on the road to Vizovice, the chairman of the local agricultural cooperative promises half of the farm, together with his daughter's hand in marriage, to whoever defeats Jožin. The man asks for a cropduster plane to spray the monster with pesticide, catches Jožin, and sells him to a zoo.

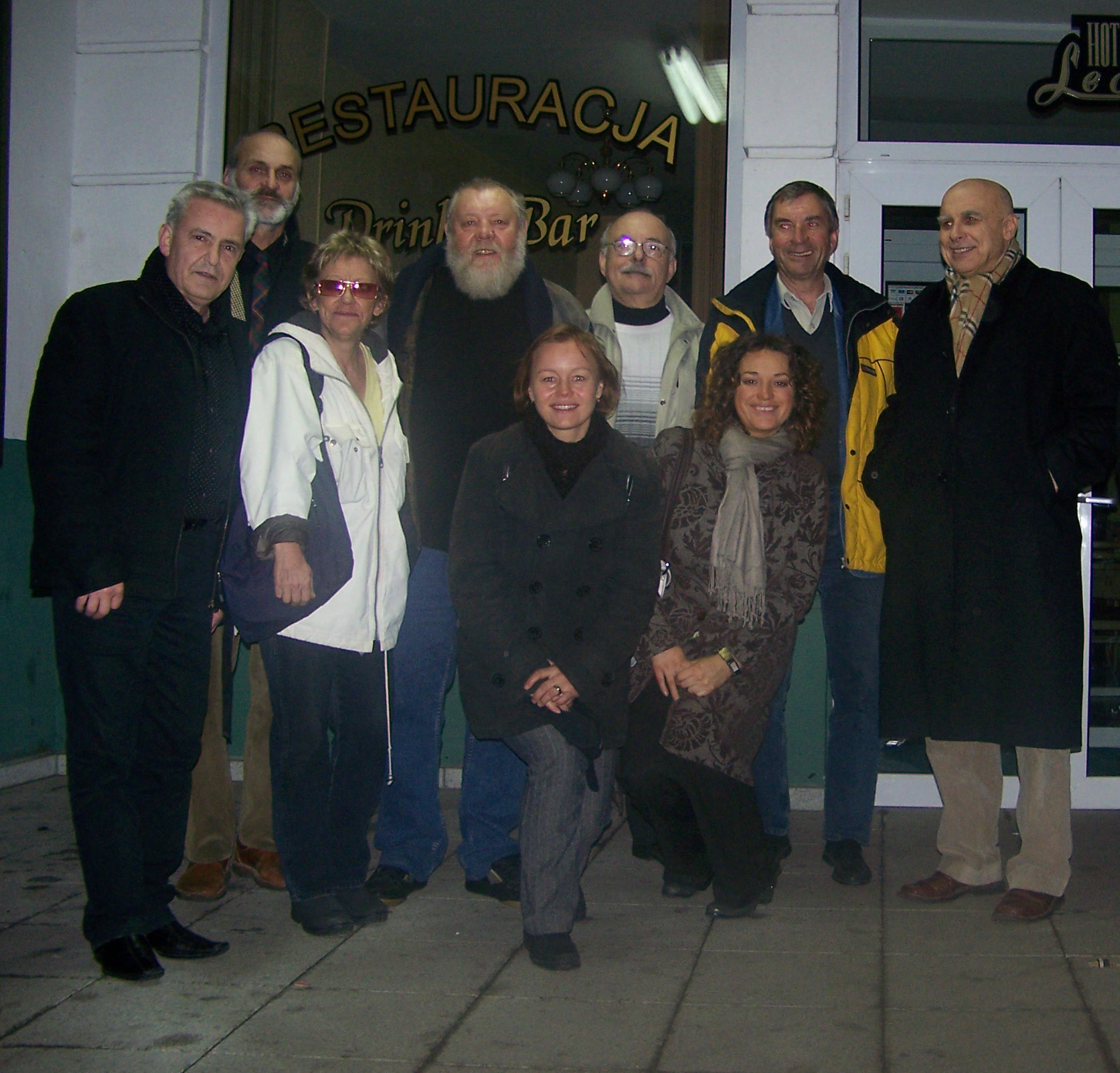
Banjo Band in 2008, with Ivan Mládek, right and Ivo Pešák, bearded

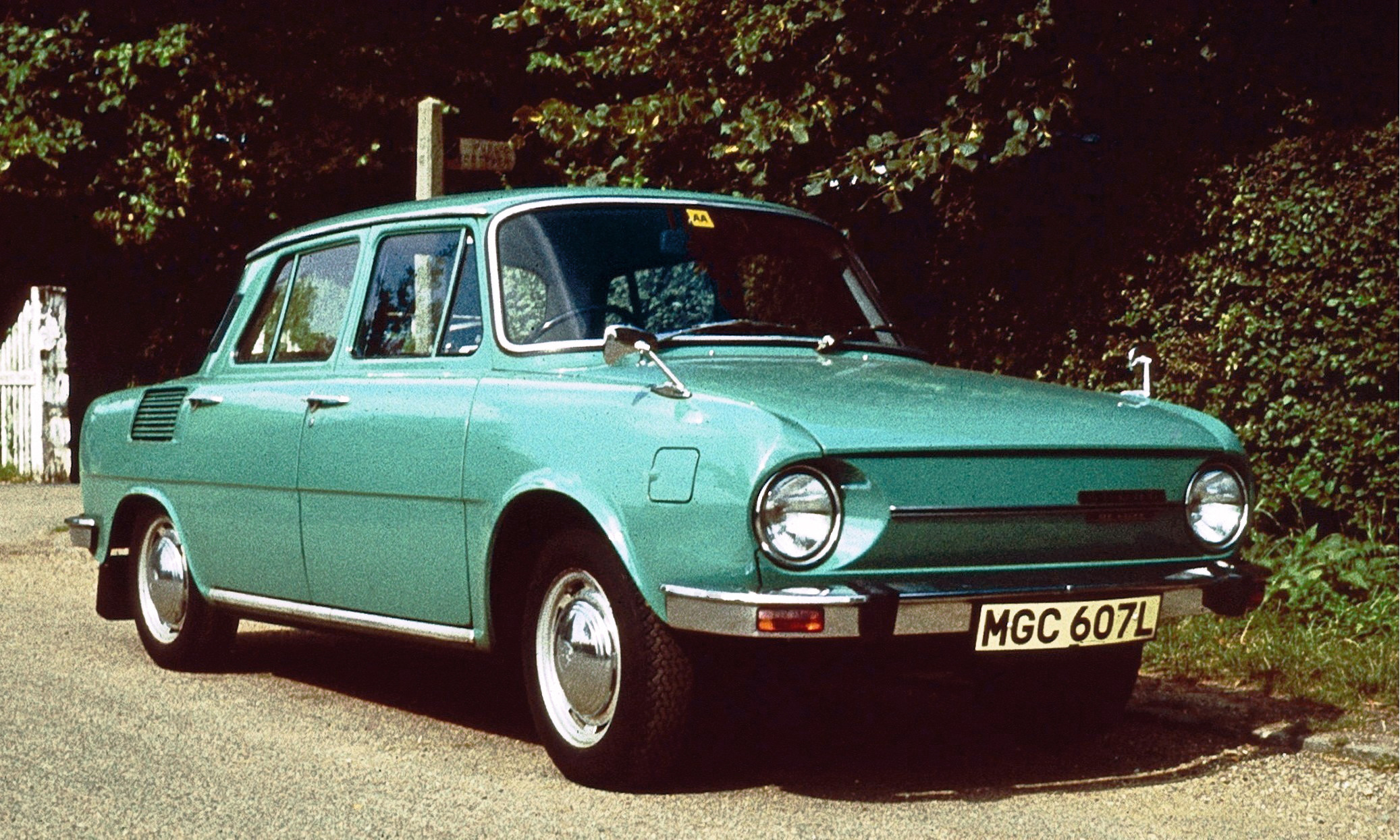
Škoda 100

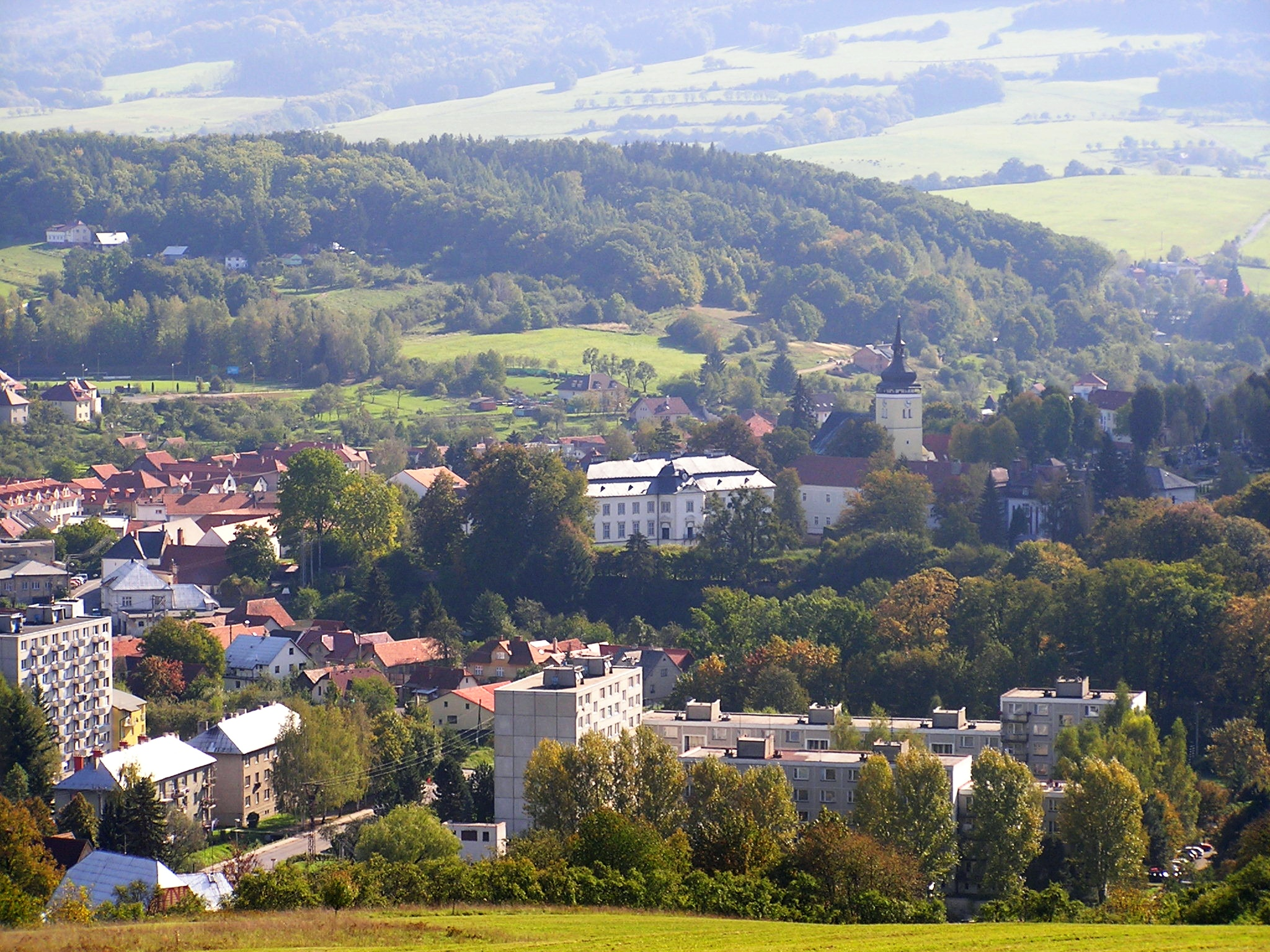
Vizovice

== Comments ==
Part of the humorous attraction of the clip is a jerky "air guitar"-style dance performed by Ivo Pešák with a straight face. Pešák recalled that the dance appeared by sheer accident: the band forgot the banjo, and not knowing what to do during the performance, Ivo started dancing.

The American heavy metal band Metallica covered the song during a concert in Prague in 2018, receiving an enthusiastic response from their audience, who sang along.
