= Druhá Tráva =

Czech bluegrass band

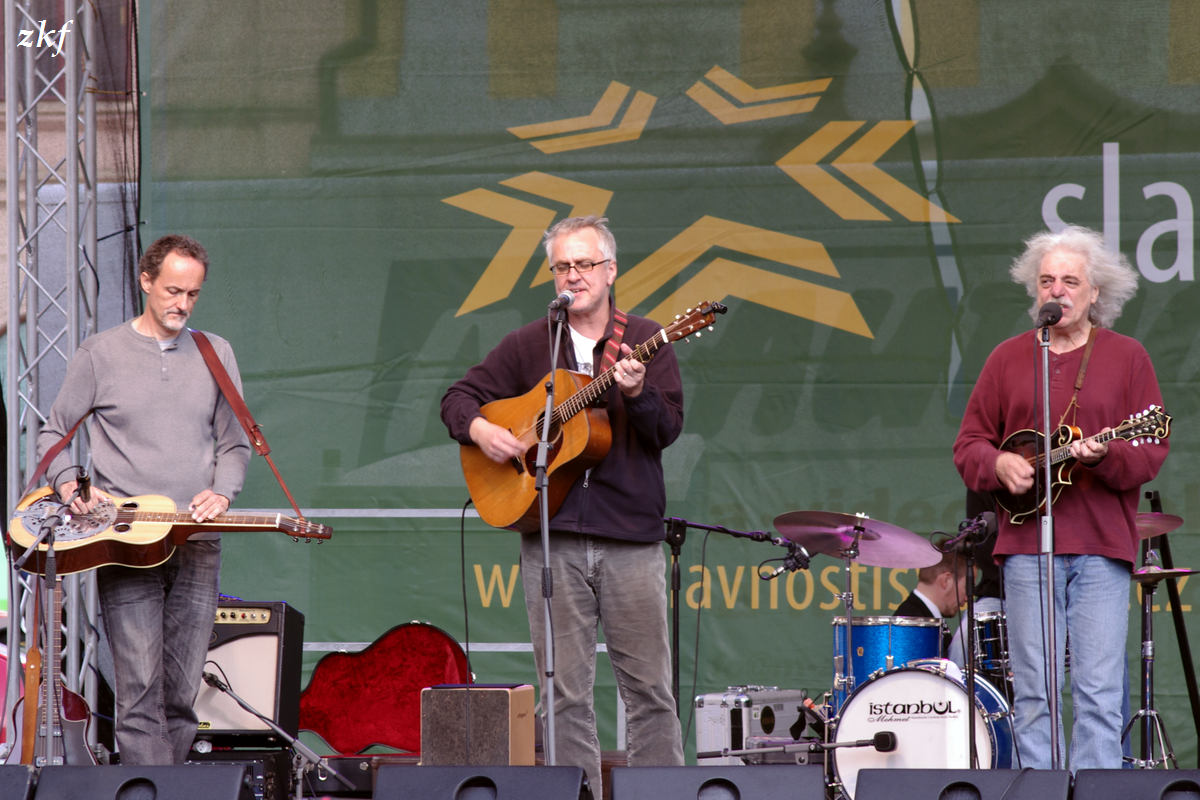
- Druhá Tráva performing in 2014

Background information
- Origin: Czechoslovakia
- Genres: Bluegrass; folk
- Years active: 1991–2001; 2004–present
- Labels: Universal; EMI; Indies
- Spinoff of: Poutníci
- Members: Robert Křesťan; Luboš Malina; Luboš Novotný; Tomáš Liška; Radek Hlávka; Martin Novák
- Past members: Petr Surý; Stanislav Paluch; Michal Vavro; Martin Ledvina; Juraj Griglák; Jiří Meisner; Pavel Malina; Štěpán Smetáček; Miloš Dvořáček; Emil Formánek; David Landštof; Kamil Slezák
- Website: druhatrava.cz

Druhá Tráva is a bluegrass band originally formed in Czechoslovakia in 1991 by Robert Křesťan and Luboš Malina, who had played in the group Poutníci together. As of 2021, they have released thirteen studio albums, four live albums, two compilations, as well as a number of side projects. They have been described as evolving from underground musicians who subverted Communism to international artists who "upend convention".

== History ==
=== Robert Křesťan and bluegrass inspiration ===
The Czech bluegrass genre developed in the mid-1960s, influenced by American bluegrass music. A regional tour by Pete Seeger in 1964 was a particular inspiration to Czech musicians. The Communist regime was hostile to such music, and Czech musicians with Western folk and rock influences helped advocate for the country's eventual independence.

Singer-songwriter and mandolinist Robert Křesťan had been a fan of American roots music since the late 1960s, listening to records that had been smuggled into the country. Křesťan was particularly fond of bluegrass pioneer Bill Monroe. Křesťan went to great pains to find records and learned how to play the music on homemade instruments. He joined the band Poutníci in 1979.

=== Formation of Druhá Tráva and early albums: 1991–1995 ===
Křesťan and another member of Poutníci, banjo player Luboš Malina, formed Druhá Tráva in 1991. The band's original lineup also included dobro player and guitarist Luboš Novotný, bassist Jiří Meisner, and guitarist Pavel Malina. The group's configuration has changed considerably over its history, though Křesťan, Malina, and Novotný have been in the band consistently since 1991. They released their debut album, Robert Křesťan & Druhá Tráva, in 1991, and followed up a year later with Revival, sung entirely in English. Starodávný svět came out in 1994 and for their fourth album, the band invited singer Pavlína Jíšová to join in the recording.

=== Lineup changes, new recordings, and breakup: 1997–2001 ===
In 1997, guitarist Pavel Malina left Druhá Tráva and was replaced by Martin Ledvina. The group subsequently released three studio albums in one year: Pohlednice, New Freedom Bell (a collaboration with American bluegrass musician Peter Rowan), and Czechmate. A year later, in 2000, they toured the United States. During this period, the ensemble experienced a frequent turnover of drummers, which included Štěpán Smetáček and Miloš Dvořáček. Bass player Jiří Meisner departed and was replaced by Juraj Griglák, and the group released their first compilation record, a double album titled Best & Last, in 2001. The same year, Druhá Tráva announced that they were breaking up.

=== Reunion and recent releases: 2004–2007 ===
In 2004, Druhá Tráva reformed, with some lineup changes. Křesťan, Malina, and Novotný were joined by double bass player Petr Surý (replaced in 2010 by Tomáš Liška) and guitarist Emil Formánek. Also in 2004, they published their eighth studio album, the English-language Good Morning, Friend. They followed it a year later with the live recording Live in Brno, a collaboration with Charlie McCoy.

In 2007, Druhá Tráva worked with a number of musicians, including Jan Vyčítal, Wabi Daněk, Kateřina García, Pavel Bobek, Pavlína Jíšová, Charlie McCoy, and Ondřej Konrád on an album of Bob Dylan covers, titled Dylanovky.

=== Further releases: 2008–present ===
Druhá Tráva has continued to tour and record to the present day. They released Marcipán z Toleda in 2011, Shuttle to Bethlehem in 2011, Pojd'me se Napít in 2013, and most recently, Díl první, which came out in 2020. Their current lineup includes guitarist Radek Hlávka, bassist Tomáš Liška, and drummer Martin Novák.

== Side projects ==
Members of Druhá Tráva have worked on their own solo projects and collaborations with other artists over the years. Robert Křesťan, Luboš Malina, and Luboš Novotný have all released solo albums; Malina formed Garcia with Kateřina García in 2006, a group that also includes former Druhá Tráva drummer David Landštof.

== Recognition ==
Druhá Tráva has toured internationally and performed with Ricky Skaggs, Peter Rowan, Davy Spillane, and Béla Fleck, among others. The band's international appearances have attracted attention for their ability to master many different genres and eras of American roots music. Their 1999 album, Czechmate, was their first to be released in the United States and gained attention from international critics for its covers of jazz standards, opera numbers, and Appalachian folk songs. Several of their later albums were released by Universal Music Group and EMI. The band has won numerous awards throughout their career, several of them from the Czech Academy of Popular Music. This includes their 1999 Anděl Award in the Folk & Country category. Since the beginning of their career, the group has faced criticism for their mix of Americana and Central European influences.

== Band members ==
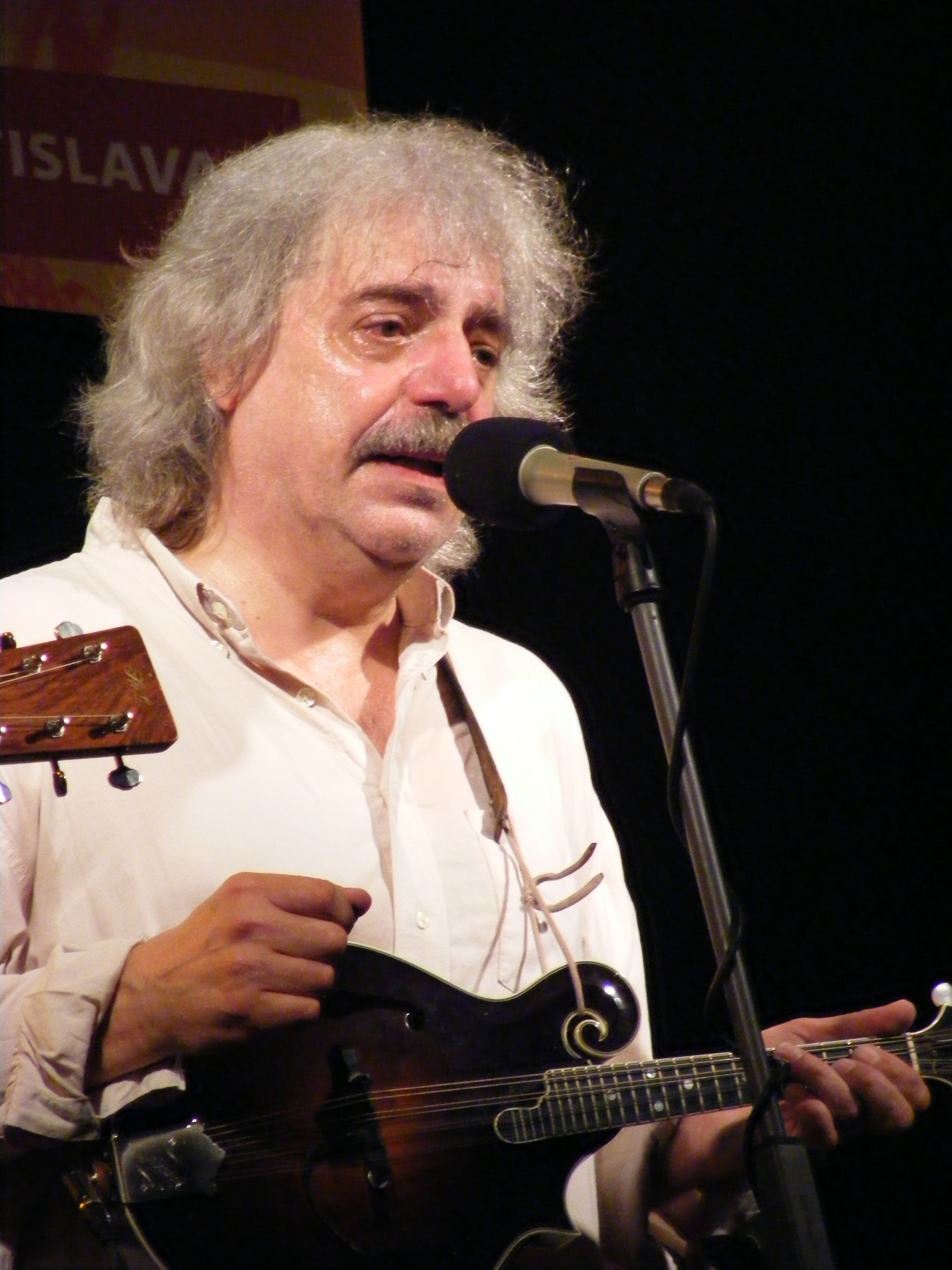
Robert Křesťan performing with the group in 2008

Current

- Robert Křesťan – vocals, mandolin, guitar
- Luboš Malina – banjo, clarinet, saxophone, Irish whistle, backing vocals
- Luboš Novotný – dobro, lap steel, backing vocals
- Radek Hlávka – guitar, backing vocals
- Tomáš Liška – double bass, bass guitar
- Martin Novák – drums, percussion, cajón

Past

- Petr Surý – bass
- Stanislav Paluch – violin
- Michal Vavro – guitar
- Martin Ledvina – guitar, mandolin, backing vocals
- Juraj Griglák – bass
- Jiří Meisner – bass, backing vocals
- Pavel Malina – guitar
- Štěpán Smetáček – drums, percussion
- Miloš Dvořáček – drums, percussion
- Emil Formánek – guitar, mandolin
- David Landštof – drums, percussion
- Kamil Slezák – drums, percussion

== Discography ==
These are albums released under the names Druhá Tráva or Robert Křesťan & Druhá Tráva. Several members of the band have released solo albums, with assistance from various permutations of the Druhá Tráva lineup.

=== Studio albums ===
- Robert Křesťan a Druhá Tráva (1991)
- Revival (1992)
- Starodávný svět (1994)
- Druhá Tráva s Pavlínou Jíšovou (1995)
- Pohlednice (1999)
- New Freedom Bell (with Peter Rowan, 1999)
- Czechmate (1999)
- Good Morning, Friend (2004)
- Dylanovky (2007)
- Marcipán z Toleda (2011)
- Shuttle to Bethlehem (2011)
- Pojd'me se Napít (2013)
- Díl první (2020)

=== Live albums ===
- Live (1997)
- Live in Brno (with Charlie McCoy, 2005)
- Živě v Telči (2012)
- In Concert (DVD – 2015)

=== Compilations ===
- Best & Last (2-CD, 2001)
- 16 nej od táborových ohňů (2008)

=== Side projects ===
- Luboš Novotný – Radost zarmoucených (1995)
- Luboš Malina – Naper se a pukni! (1995)
- Luboš Malina – Piece of Cake (1999)
- Luboš Novotný – Venku z trávy (2000)
- Robert Křesťan – 1775 básní Emily Dickinsonové (2002)
- Luboš Malina – Afterparty (2004)
- Luboš Malina & Martin Fridrich – Dueling Fingers (2005)

== Selected awards ==
- Annual Czechoslovak Music Award (1991)
- Anděl Award – Folk & Country (1999)
