= Czech bluegrass =

Subgenre of bluegrass music

Czech bluegrass is Czech interpretations of bluegrass music.

== Background ==
Czech interest in things American dates to the nineteenth century, and is suffused with luminous conceptions of the Old West, cowboys, American Indians and other iconic images. Czech tramping emerged as its main vector after 1918 in the newly formed Czechoslovak Republic. Tramping in this sense is a Czech-specific blend of ideas taken from Scouting, the German wandervogels, and Americanist romanticism. The music that accompanied the movement (Czech tramping music) was a blend of Czech folklore, early jazz and other "syncopated music", such as barbershop, harmony singing, and popular songs from the U.S., France, and elsewhere. Czech tramping enthusiasts quickly incorporated the sounds and "style" of Bluegrass when they first heard this music in the late 1940s.

== First generation ==
Many Czech bluegrass "old-timers" date their involvement with something specifically bluegrass-like to the post-war years, a lean time for the music, but one that contains important developments. Information and inspiration for the music reached Czechs through unlikely means. When Czechs tuned into Armed Forces Network radio programs from US military installations in Munich, they were flooded with a wealth of American music that they were able to freely use for their own ends. Tramping's song repertory was soon augmented with tunes learned from the likes of Bill Monroe, Johnny Cash, Jimmie Rodgers and others.

The 1964 concert tour of Pete Seeger was probably the first opportunity for people in Communist Czechoslovakia to see banjo played live.

Instruments were often an obstacle, especially the still largely unknown banjo. The few musicians who tried to get by on tenor banjo and guitar banjo had little to inform their attempts at emulating what they heard on the radio, until Pete Seeger's 1964 Prague concert. Banjoist Marko Čermak was able to build the first Czech five-string banjo from photographs taken at this event. Soon after he started presenting this new style and instrument in performances with the group Greenhorns (Zelenáči).

This first generation of players (which also includes Rangers and Taxmeni) inspired many Czechs to take up distinctly bluegrass-like music, necessitating cottage industries and then actual businesses to support this community with written materials, recordings, and of course, instruments.

Czechs were in many ways isolated from sources of American bluegrass, but still were able to stay informed, though not without some difficulty. Paradoxically the 1968 Soviet invasion helped Bluegrass in the Czech lands. It scattered many Czechs into exile, whence they were able to send books, recordings, and other materials back home. The first (and now longest-running) Bluegrass festival in Europe began its history in 1972 in Kopidlno, only seven years after Carlton Haney introduced the concept with his Roanoke (VA) Bluegrass Festival of 1965.

== Second generation: The progressive impulse ==
When recordings by the band New Grass Revival starting spreading through the Czech bluegrass community in the 1970s-80s, interest was sparked in the progressive possibilities of this music. The band Poutníci are a Brno-based group that included in their repertory bluegrass standards translated into Czech, newly composed and more folk-like songs, as well as classical instrumentals adapted for bluegrass instrumentation. They also sing almost entirely in Czech, making their music more accessible to wider audiences in their own country. This group continues to play today, with almost entirely new personnel. Lead singer and songwriter Robert Křesťan has become one of the most well-regarded Czech "folk" singer-songwriters, and has continued his trajectory away from the core of bluegrass with his band Druhá Tráva, who are best known in the U.S. for their collaboration with former Bluegrass Boy Peter Rowan.

Mandolinist/Fiddler Jiří Plocek left Poutníci to found the band Teagrass and has created a performance idiom that includes elements of more traditionalist bluegrass, jazz, klezmer, Moravian folk music, and other regional traditionalist genres.

Petr Kůs is another notable composer/bandleader known more for the poetics of his texts than for his solid mandolin chops. Like Křesťan, he moved from emulative beginnings to a style that is less indebted to Bluegrass, though his band has always maintained the traditional bluegrass instrumental lineup and a lot of its musical affect.

== Czech Bluegrass and the Velvet Revolution ==
Traditional bluegrass music played on acoustic instruments was a vital part of Czech culture during the Velvet Revolution in the Czech Republic. Bluegrass, along with other styles of music, was used as a form of expression and rebellion by the Czech people, as a way to express their grievances with the Communist Party of Czechoslovakia. Czechs were exposed to bluegrass music through the radio, and eventually began taking these American songs and changing the lyrics to reflect their frustrations with the government at the time and express longing for change and freedom. This style of music made it easy to come together as a community and play these songs as a way to subtly rebel against a corrupt government.

== Current scene ==
The range of "bluegrass" expressions in the Czech Republic is wide. All the streams of emulation and innovation persist, serving different needs and sub-communities. An interesting current phenomenon is the growing streams of bluegrass music and materials that are exported from the country. Czech bluegrass bands of the more traditionalist variety tour to some degree in the U.S., but find it more practical to limit their travel to Europe, where they are known for their masterful instrumental and vocal performance. Czech luthiers have built a reputation for their fine craftsmanship and quality instruments. Makers such as Jiři Lebeda, Ondra Holoubek, and Eduard Kristůfek produce guitars, mandolins, and dobros that are known and purchased worldwide. Most significantly, perhaps, are the metal parts produced by banjo-makers Jaroslav Průcha, Láďa Ptáček, and Pavel Krištůfek, which are used throughout the world, most notably by Gibson and other established U.S. makers.

== See also ==
- Potápky, Czech subculture interested in American culture
- List of bluegrass music festivals
- Bluegrass music in Europe
