= Ivo Pešák =

Czech musician and actor (1944–2011)

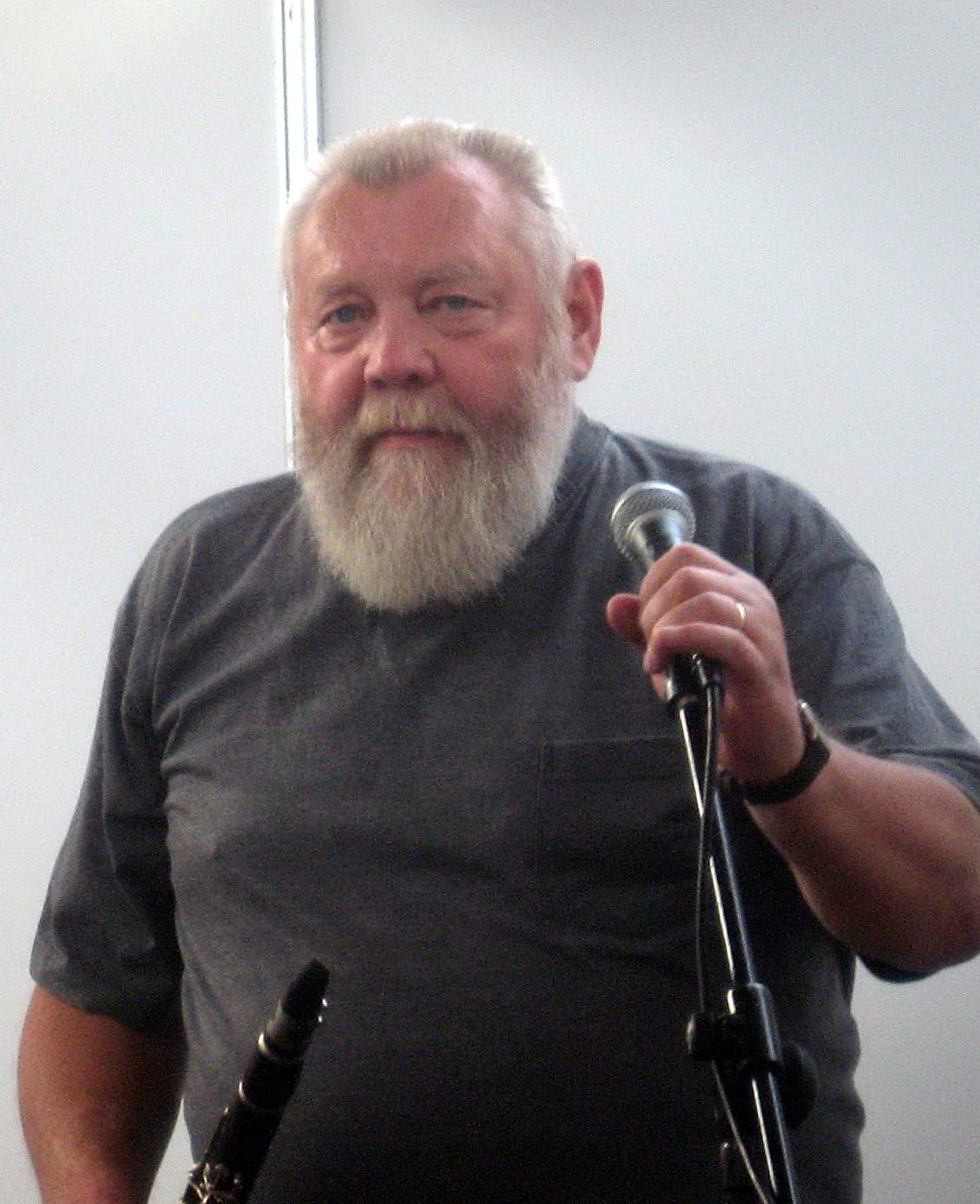
- Pešák in 2007

Background information
- Born: 7 September 1944; Jaroměř, Protectorate of Bohemia and Moravia
- Died: 9 May 2011 (aged 66) Prague, Czech Republic
- Genres: Pop; folk; rock and roll
- Occupations: Musician; actor
- Instruments: Vocals; clarinet
- Formerly of: Banjo Band; Dýza Boys; Rockec Ivo Pešáka

Ivo Pešák (7 September 1944 – 9 May 2011) was a Czech musician and actor.

== Early life ==
Pešák was born in 1944 in the town of Jaroměř, then part of the Protectorate of Bohemia and Moravia. In 1972, he graduated from the Prague Conservatory and then worked for three years in the Central Bohemian Symphony Orchestra in Poděbrady as a clarinetist. Afterward, he taught at a music school for one year.

== Career ==
He is best known for his work with Ivan Mládek, in the latter's Banjo Band, and particularly for his high-spirited dance in the 1977 video for the song "Jožin z bažin". In his later years, Pešák sang with Václav Upír Krejčí in a vocal duo named Dýza Boys, and he appeared in a number of films, including Trhala fialky dynamitem (1992), as well as television series.

Pešák had his own band, a rock and roll revival group named Rockec Ivo Pešáka. They released two albums: Hej, hej, rock and roll (1996) and Rockec Ivo Pešáka (2002).

== Death ==
Pešák died of heart failure on 9 May 2011, aged 66.

== Selected discography ==
with Rockec Ivo Pešáka

- Hej, hej, rock and roll (1996)
- Rockec Ivo Pešáka (2002)

with Dýza Boys

- Co píseň to HIT! (2002)
