= Poutníci =

Czech bluegrass band

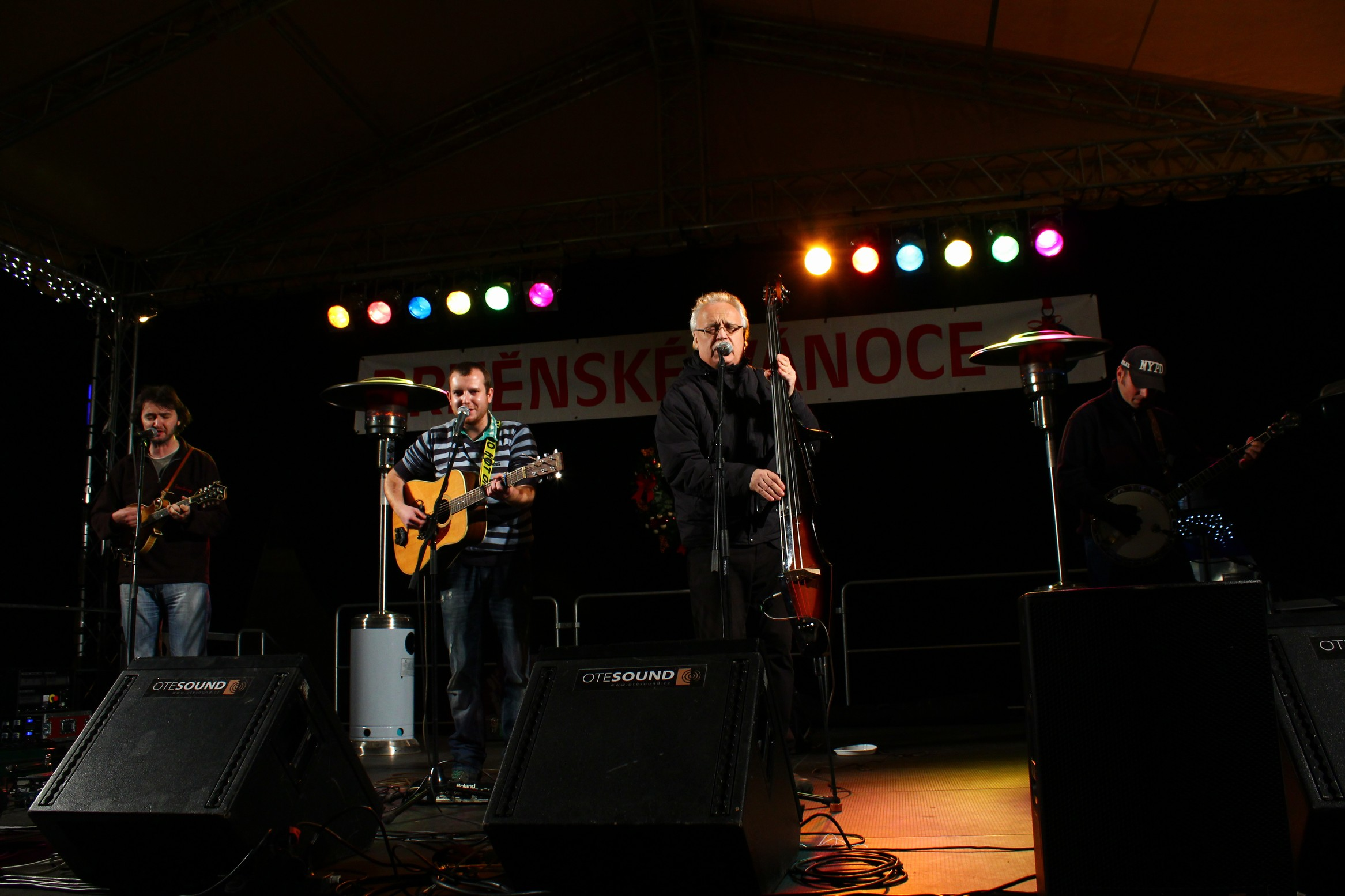
- Poutníci performing in 2011

Background information
- Origin: Maloměřice, Brno, Czechia
- Genres: Bluegrass; country
- Years active: 1970–present
- Spinoffs: Druhá Tráva
- Awards: Porta award: 1982, 1983; Best Non-American Bluegrass Record of the Year: 1989, 1990
- Members: Jiří Pola; Jan Máca; Jakub Bílý; Petr Vošta
- Past members: František Linhárek; Josef Šulák; Miroslav Kocman; Robert Křesťan; Pavel Petržela; Luboš Malina; Zdeněk Kalina; Jiří Plocek; Miroslav Hulán; Hana Černohorská; Svaťa Kotas; Ladislav Cejnk; Jan Máca; Petr Brandejs; Jiří Mach; Peter Mečiar
- Website: poutnici.cz

Poutníci is a Czech bluegrass and country ensemble formed in 1970 in Maloměřice, Brno. In addition to original compositions, the band covers songs by American artists such as Lester Flatt, Bill Monroe, Tennessee Ernie Ford, and Gordon Lightfoot. As of 2026, they have released 12 studio albums, two live records, and two compilations.

== History ==
Poutníci was formed in the Czech city of Brno in 1970. Originally consisting of guitarist František Linhárek, vocalist Josef Šulák, and mandolin player Miroslav Kocman, this lineup only lasted two years. Šulák left in 1973 and Kocman in 1976. In 1982 and 1983, the band won at the music festival Porta in Ústí nad Labem. In 1987, Poutníci released their self-titled, debut album. At this time, their lineup consisted of Linhárek, Robert Křesťan (vocals, banjo), Luboš Malina (banjo, violin, saxophone), Zdeněk Kalina (vocals, guitar), Jiří Plocek (mandolin), Miroslav Hulán (guitar), and Jiří Pola (double bass, vocals). They issued three more records in this configuration, toured across Europe several times, and won Best Non-American Bluegrass Record of the Year by the American Organization for the Preservation and Development of Bluegrass Music in 1989 and 1990.

1991 witnessed the departure of Linhárek, Plocek, Křesťan, and Malina, the latter two going on to found Druhá Tráva. The band added its first female vocalist, Hana Černohorská, and it saw the return of banjo player Svaťa Kotas and violinist Ladislav Cejnk. They released two new albums, before splitting up in 1997 and later reforming in the lineup of Pola, Hulán, Kalina, and new members Jan Máca (mandolin, violin) and Petr Brandejs (banjo).

Between 2000 and 2004, Poutníci lost longtime guitarist Miroslav Hulán. He was replaced by Jiří Mach, who in addition to singing and playing guitar also performed on mandolin and violin. The band released the album Pláč a smích in 2003. In 2005, they added Slovak banjo, Dobro, and lap steel guitar player Peter Mečiar, who replaced Brandejs. The following year, the group issued the album Poutníci 2006. In 2007, longtime guitarist and vocalist Zdeněk Kalina decided to step away from playing with the band full-time, agreeing to join them for major concerts and events in the Brno area.

In 2009, the young singer Jakub Bílý replaced Jiří Mach. The next year, the band celebrated their 40th anniversary by touring all year with Robert Křesťan's Druhá Tráva, which culminated in the release of the live album Poutníci slaví 40 let live in 2011. That year saw the band touring in the lineup of Pola, Máca, Mečiar, and Bílý, with occasional guest appearances by honorary member Zdeněk Kalina. The band toured extensively in 2012, including in Poland, Germany, and Slovakia. The next year, they released their 11th studio album, titled Country vánoce. In 2017, Poutníci issued their second retrospective collection, a double album titled Zlatá éra: 1983–1991.

The band celebrated their 50th with the release of the record Stíny na střechách in 2020, just prior to the outbreak of the COVID-19 pandemic, which prevented them from performing live. That year, banjo player Peter Mečiar left the band, after 15 years. He was replaced by Petr Vošta. Poutníci were finally able to hold an anniversary tour the following year, which saw them performing both in Prague and Brno, with guests that included Robert Křesťan and his band Trapeři, Petr Brandejs, Svaťa Kotas, and Hana Černohorská.

== Band members ==
Current

- Jiří Pola – vocals, bass, double bass (1980–present)
- Jan Máca – mandolin, vocals (1997–present)
- Jakub Bílý – guitar, vocals, mandolin (2009–present)
- Petr Vošta – banjo (2022–present)

Past

- Josef Šulák – vocals (1970–1973)
- Miroslav Kocman – mandolin (1970–1976)
- František Linhárek – guitar (1970–1991)
- Robert Křesťan – banjo, vocals (1979–1991)
- Pavel Petržela – mandolin (1979–1987)
- Luboš Malina – banjo, violin, saxophone (–1991)
- Zdeněk Kalina – guitar, vocals (1972–2007; occasional guest, 2007–present)
- Jiří Plocek – mandolin (–1991
- Miroslav Hulán – guitar (?–2001)
- Hana Černohorská – vocals (1991–)
- Svaťa Kotas – banjo (1991–)
- Ladislav Cejnk – violin (1991–)
- Petr Brandejs – banjo (1997–2005; occasional sub for Petr Vošta, 2005–present)
- Jiří Mach – mandolin, violin, guitar, vocals (2001–2009)
- Peter Mečiar – banjo, Dobro, lap steel guitar (2005–2020)

== Discography ==
Studio albums

- Poutníci (1987)
- Wayfaring Strangers (1989)
- Chromí koně (1990)
- The Days of Auld Lang Syne (1991)
- Je to v nás (1992)
- Písně brněnských kovbojů (1994)
- Co už je pryč (1997)
- Krajní meze (1998)
- Pláč a smích (2003)
- Poutníci 2006 (2006)
- Country vánoce (2013)
- Stíny na střechách (2020)

Live albums

- Poutníci Live (1991)
- Poutníci slaví 40 let live (2CD, 2011)

Compilations

- Vzpomínky (Výběr z tvorby 1991–1998) (1999)
- Zlatá éra: 1983–1991 (2017)
