= Banjo Band =

Czech country band

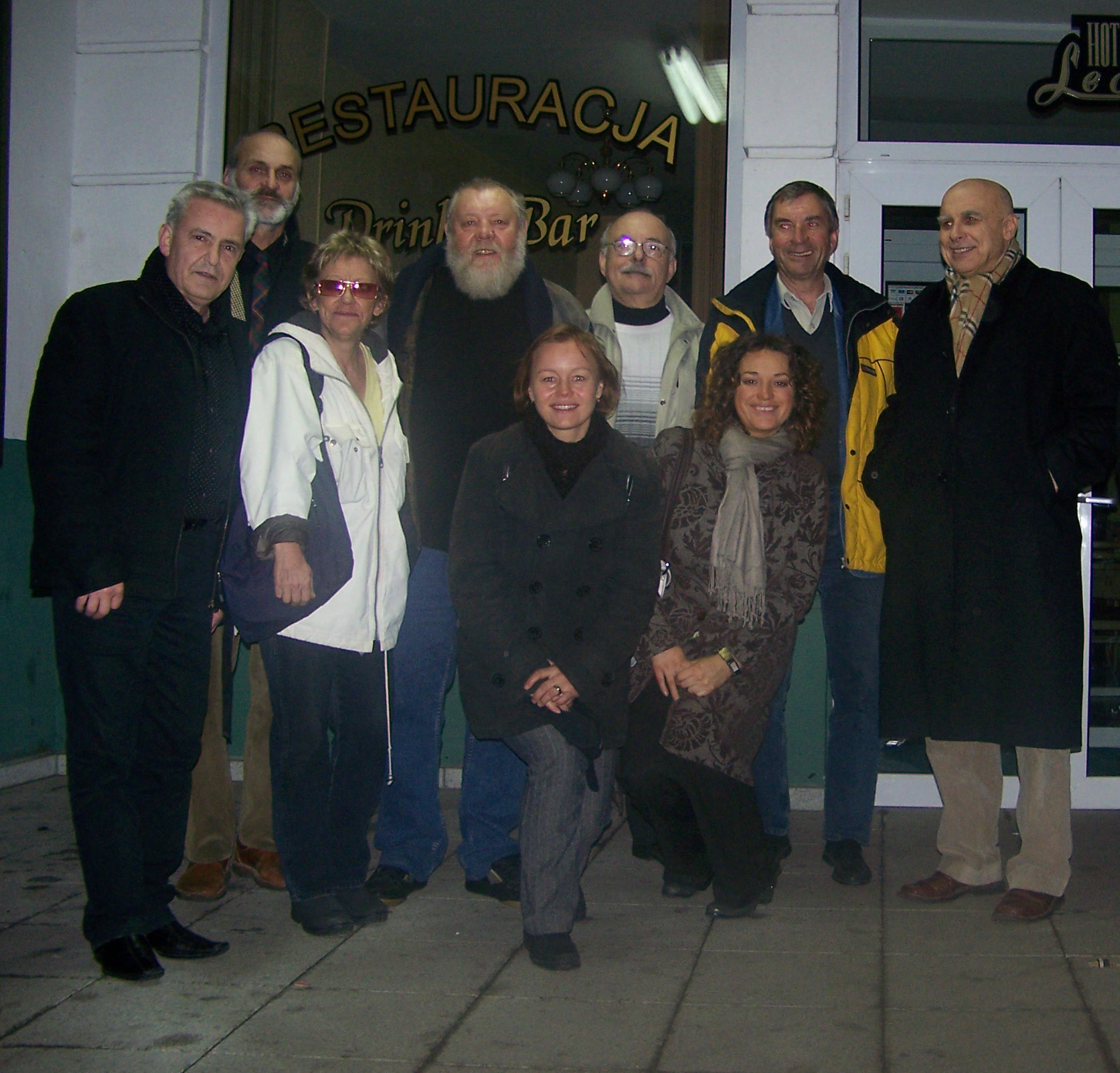
- Banjo Band in 2008

Background information
- Also known as: Banjo Band Ivana Mládka
- Origin: Prague, Czechoslovakia
- Genres: Country; folk; jazz
- Years active: 1966–present
- Members: Ivan Mládek; Jan Mrázek; Lenka Šindelářová; Lenka Plačková; Milan Pitkin; Libuše Roubychová
- Past members: Ivo Pešák (deceased)
- Website: mladekivan.cz

Banjo Band, also known as Banjo Band Ivana Mládka, is a Czech country band formed in 1966 and led by singer and comedian Ivan Mládek. They are best known both at home and internationally for the song "Jožin z bažin", released on the album Nashledanou! in 1977.

== Band members ==
Current

- Ivan Mládek
- Jan Mrázek
- Lenka Šindelářová
- Lenka Plačková
- Milan Pitkin
- Libuše Roubychová

Past

- Ivo Pešák

== Selected discography ==
- Dobrý den! (1976)
- Nashledanou! 1977
- Ej, Mlhošu, Mlhošu! (1979)
- Předposlední leč (1981)
- Skupina Ivana Mládka (1983)
- Banjo, z pytle ven! (1985))
- Potůčku, nebublej! (1987)
- Ta country česká, ta je tak hezká (1991)
- Proč mě ženy nemaj rády (2002)
- ... a vo tom to je! (2002)
- Jožin z bažin w Polsce (2008)
