= Sedlec-Prčice =

- Town
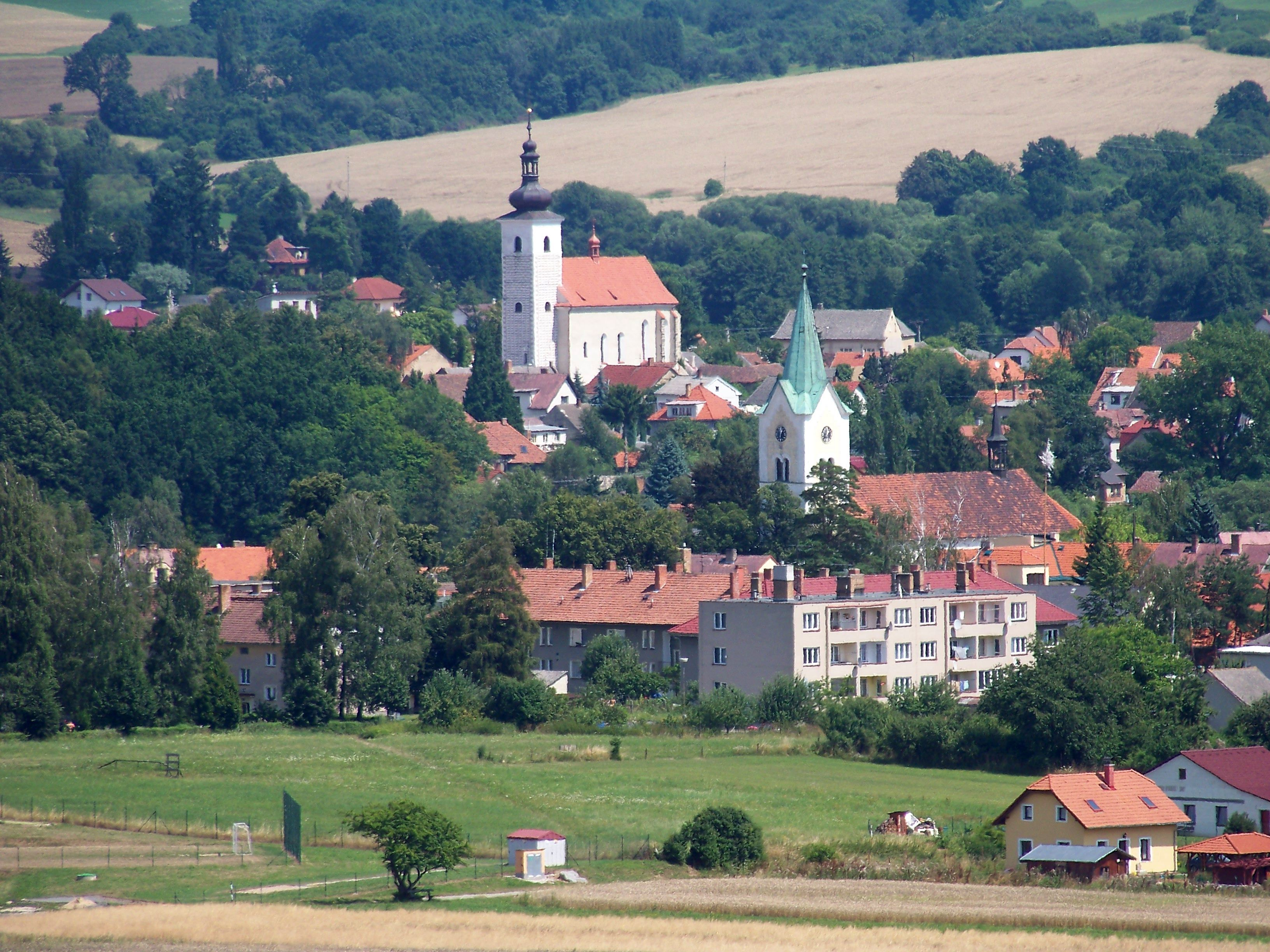
- Sedlec with the Church of Saint Jerome and Prčice with the Church of Saint Lawrence

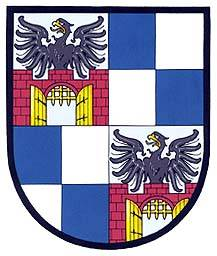
- Flag Coat of arms

- Location in the Czech Republic
- Coordinates: 49°34′19″N 14°31′58″E
- Country: Czech Republic
- Region: Central Bohemian
- District: Příbram
- First mentioned: 11th century

Government
  - Mayor: Miroslava Jeřábková

Area
  - Total: 64.14 km^{2} (24.76 sq mi)
- Elevation: 407 m (1,335 ft)

Population (2026-01-01)
  - Total: 2,952
  - Density: 46.02/km^{2} (119.2/sq mi)
- Time zone: UTC+1 (CET)
  - Summer (DST): UTC+2 (CEST)
- Postal code: 257 91
- Website: www.sedlec-prcice.cz

Sedlec-Prčice (Czech pronunciation: [ˈsɛdlɛts ˈpr̩tʃɪtsɛ]) is a town in Příbram District in the Central Bohemian Region of the Czech Republic. It has about 3,000 inhabitants. The town was created in 1957, when the municipalities of Sedlec and Prčice merged. The historical centres of Sedlec and Prčice are well preserved and are protected together as one urban monument zone.

== Administrative division ==
Sedlec-Prčice consists of 36 municipal parts (in brackets population according to the 2021 census):

- Sedlec (1,008)
- Prčice (608)
- Bolechovice (51)
- Bolešín (15)
- Božetín (10)
- Chotětice (74)
- Divišovice (84)
- Dvorce (21)
- Jetřichovice (45)
- Kvasejovice (124)
- Kvašťov (14)
- Lidkovice (27)
- Malkovice (25)
- Matějov (19)
- Měšetice (125)
- Monín (18)
- Moninec (2)
- Mrákotice (50)
- Myslkov (32)
- Náhlík (3)
- Násilov (7)
- Nové Dvory (69)
- Přestavlky (157)
- Rohov (14)
- Staré Mitrovice (34)
- Šanovice (26)
- Stuchanov (31)
- Sušetice (50)
- Uhřice (50)
- Včelákova Lhota (2)
- Veletín (33)
- Víska (42)
- Vozerovice (6)
- Vrchotice (75)
- Záběhlice (33)
- Záhoří a Kozinec (8)

== Etymology ==
The name Sedlec is common in the Czech Republic. It is derived from the Czech word sedlo, which means 'saddle' in modern Czech, but also 'village' in old West Slavic languages.

The name Prčice is derived from the personal name Prk.

== Geography ==
Sedlec-Prčice is located about 40 kilometres (25 mi) east of Příbram and 50 km (31 mi) south of Prague. It lies in the Vlašim Uplands. The highest point of the municipal territory is at 722 m (2,369 ft) above sea level and is located near the peak of the hill Javorová skála, which is the highest hill of the whole Vlašim Uplands. The territory of Sedlec-Prčice is rich is small watercourses and fish ponds. The stream Sedlecký potok divides the built-up areas of Sedlec and Prčice.

== History ==
The village of Prčice was first mentioned in written document already in the 11th century. The first fortress in Prčice is documented in 1179. The first written mention of Sedlec is from the 14th century. The town was established in 1957 by merging of neighbouring municipalities of Sedlec and Prčice.

== Demographics ==
Historical population

Year	Pop.	±%
1869	6,536	—
1880	6,559	+0.4%
1890	6,166	−6.0%
1900	5,644	−8.5%
1910	5,301	−6.1%

Year	Pop.	±%
1921	5,138	−3.1%
1930	4,721	−8.1%
1950	3,866	−18.1%
1961	3,793	−1.9%
1970	3,569	−5.9%

Year	Pop.	±%
1980	3,403	−4.7%
1991	3,202	−5.9%
2001	2,946	−8.0%
2011	2,904	−1.4%
2021	2,992	+3.0%

Source: Censuses

== Transport ==
Despite the vast municipal territory, there are no railways or major roads passing through Sedlec-Prčice.

== Culture ==
Sedlec-Prčice is known as the final destination of the annual Prague–Prčice March.

== Sights ==
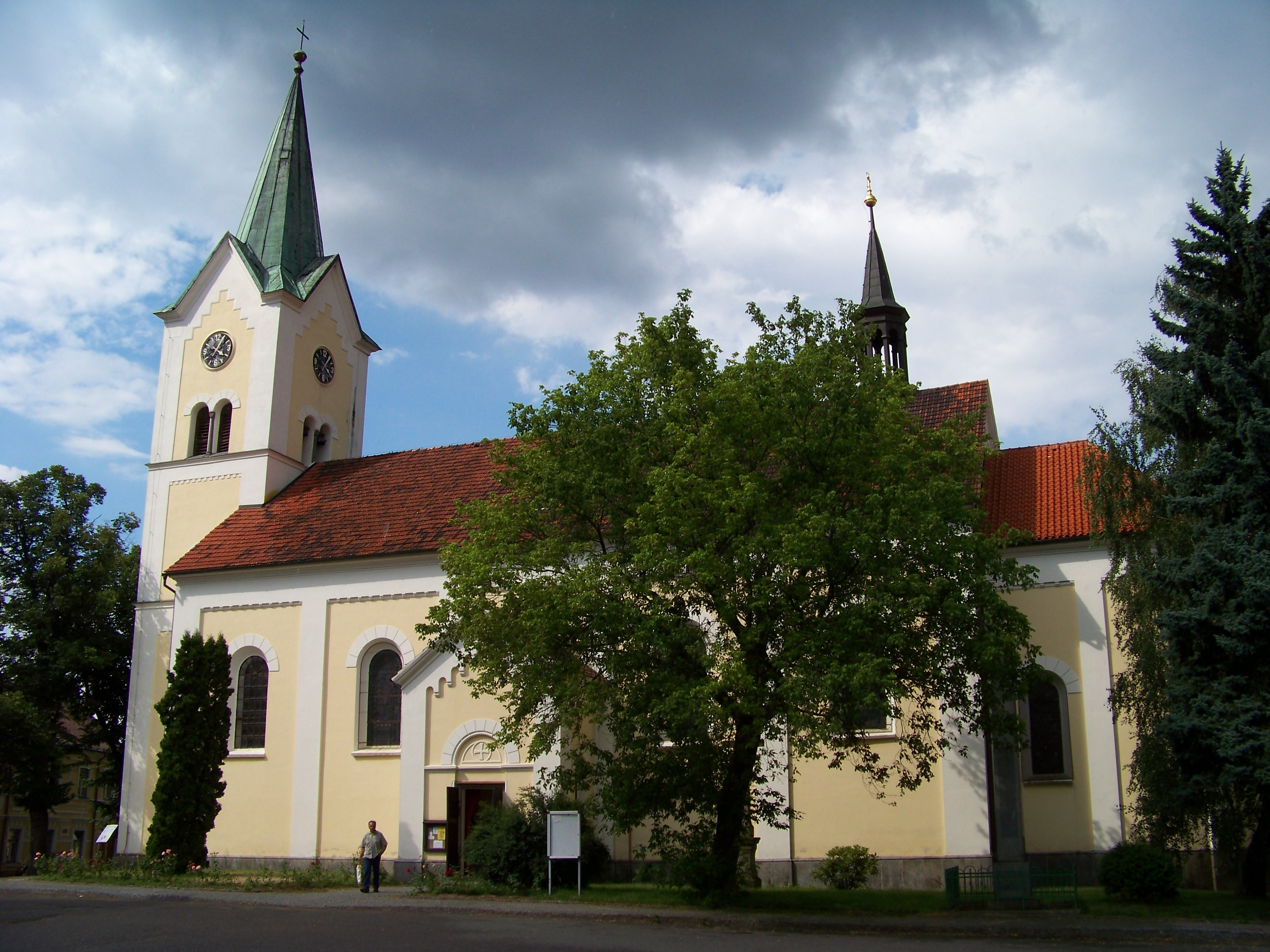
Church of Saint Jerome in Sedlec

The main landmark of Sedlec is the parish Church of Saint Jerome. It was a Romanesque church, founded in the 11th or 12th century. In the 14th and 15th centuries it was rebuilt in the Gothic style, and extended. It is the only church in the Czech Republic that is painted in the Art Nouveau style.

The main landmark of Prčice is the Church of Saint Lawrence. It was also founded as a Romanesque building in the 11th or 12th century, but was gradually rebuilt. Several Romanesque elements have been preserved to this day. The church is equipped with a valuable organ from 1731 by local native Bedřich Semerád. The church also includes an unused Gothic bell from the early 14th century, which belongs to the oldest bells in Bohemia.

Presence of the Jewish community is commemorated by the old synagogue on the town square that now hosts a small factory that makes sporting equipment.

Located in a field somewhere beyond the town is the old Jewish cemetery, founded in 1867. There are still said to be a small number of gravestones hidden in the overgrowth. The cemetery is owned by the local Jewish community.

== Notable people ==
- Witiko of Prčice (c. 1120 – 1194), nobleman
- Joseph Gelinek (1758–1825), Austrian composer and pianist
- František Pištěk (1786–1846), Roman Catholic prelate
- Adolf Čech (1841–1903), conductor
