= Ivan Mládek =

Czech musician and comedian (born 1942)

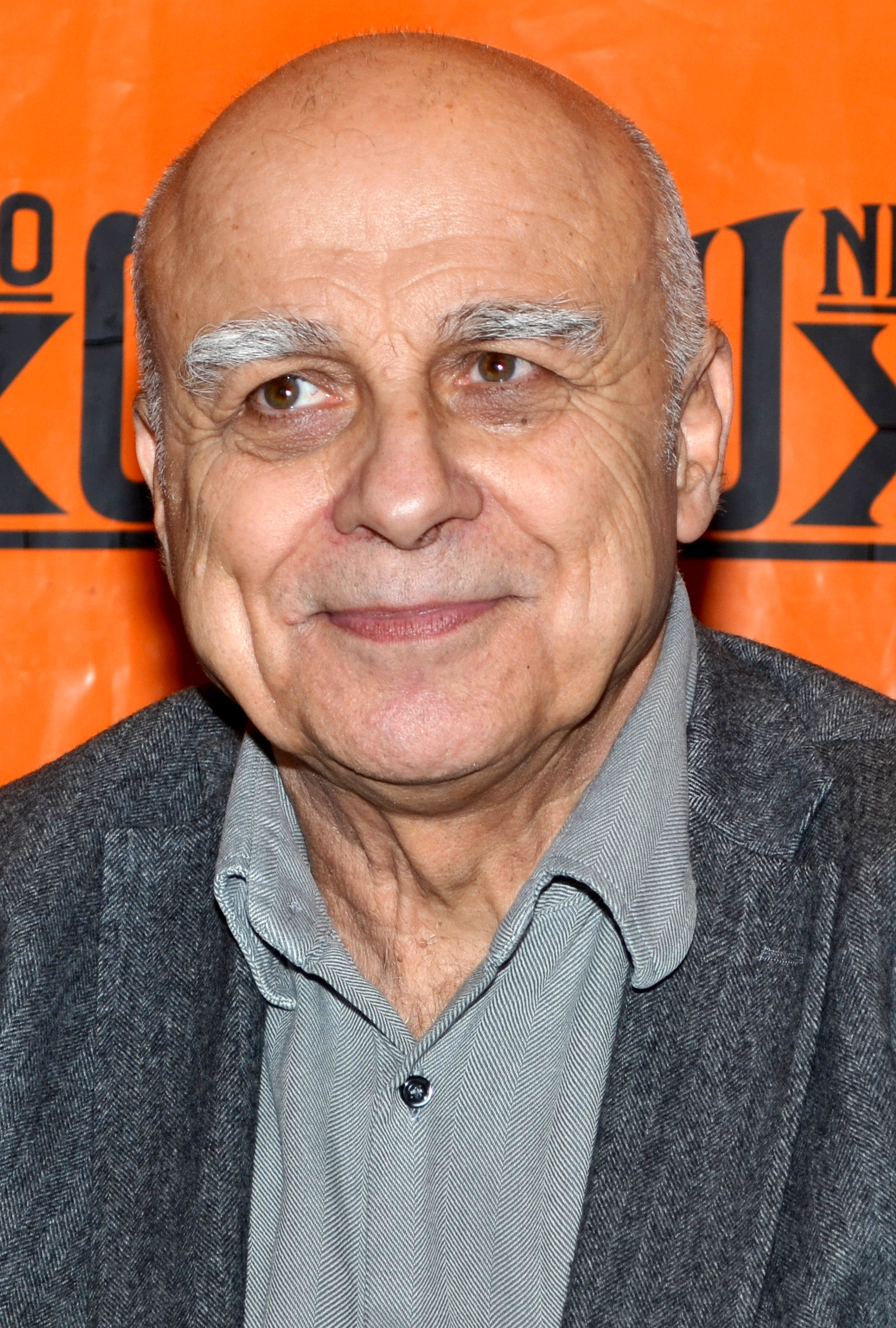
- Mládek in 2013
- Born: 7 February 1942 (age 84); Prague, Bohemia and Moravia
- Education: University of Economics
- Musical career
- Occupations: Songwriter, composer, comedian, musician
- Instruments: Banjo, kazoo
- Years active: 1959–present
- Website: mladekivan.cz

Signature
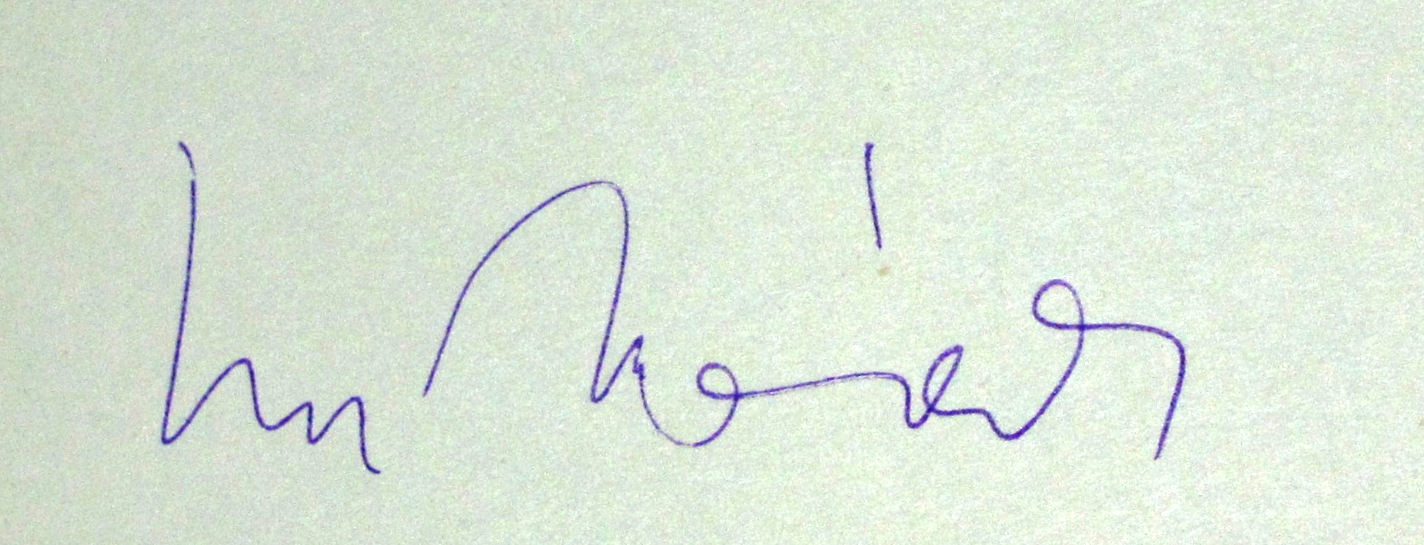

Ivan Mládek (born 7 February 1942) is a Czech recording artist, composer, and comedian who gained success in the mid-1970s.

Born in Prague, He started his career in the mid-1950s, and moved to Paris in 1968, before returning to his homeland in the early 1970s. He is best known as a songwriter and singer for his 1977 hit parody "Jožin z bažin", which later become a parody by various artists and singers. Mládek is known for creating the Guitariano guitar, a guitar shaped synthesizer. Mládek also performs with his country band Banjo Band in the mid-1960s, along with his frequent collaborator, Ivo Pešák. In addition to music, Mládek was also a successful comedian and actor in the 1980s. He has written 233 songs over his long career.

== Biography ==
Ivan Mládek was born in Prague, where he spent most of his childhood. His father, a lawyer and painter, taught him to paint, but he preferred music and started his now-famous Banjo Band. The Banjo Band first performed in 1966. In 1968 Mládek emigrated to France to pursue his music career in Paris. He soon returned to Czechoslovakia and became famous as a musician in the second half of the 1970s; he has written over 400 songs as of 2007. He became known as a comedian in the 1980s. Mladek's first humorous story was published in 1980 in the magazine Mladý Svět. Many of the stories that followed may be found in the eight books that Mládek wrote. Mládek has a wife named Eva and son named "Stephan," in Slavic "Štěpán."

== Guitariano ==
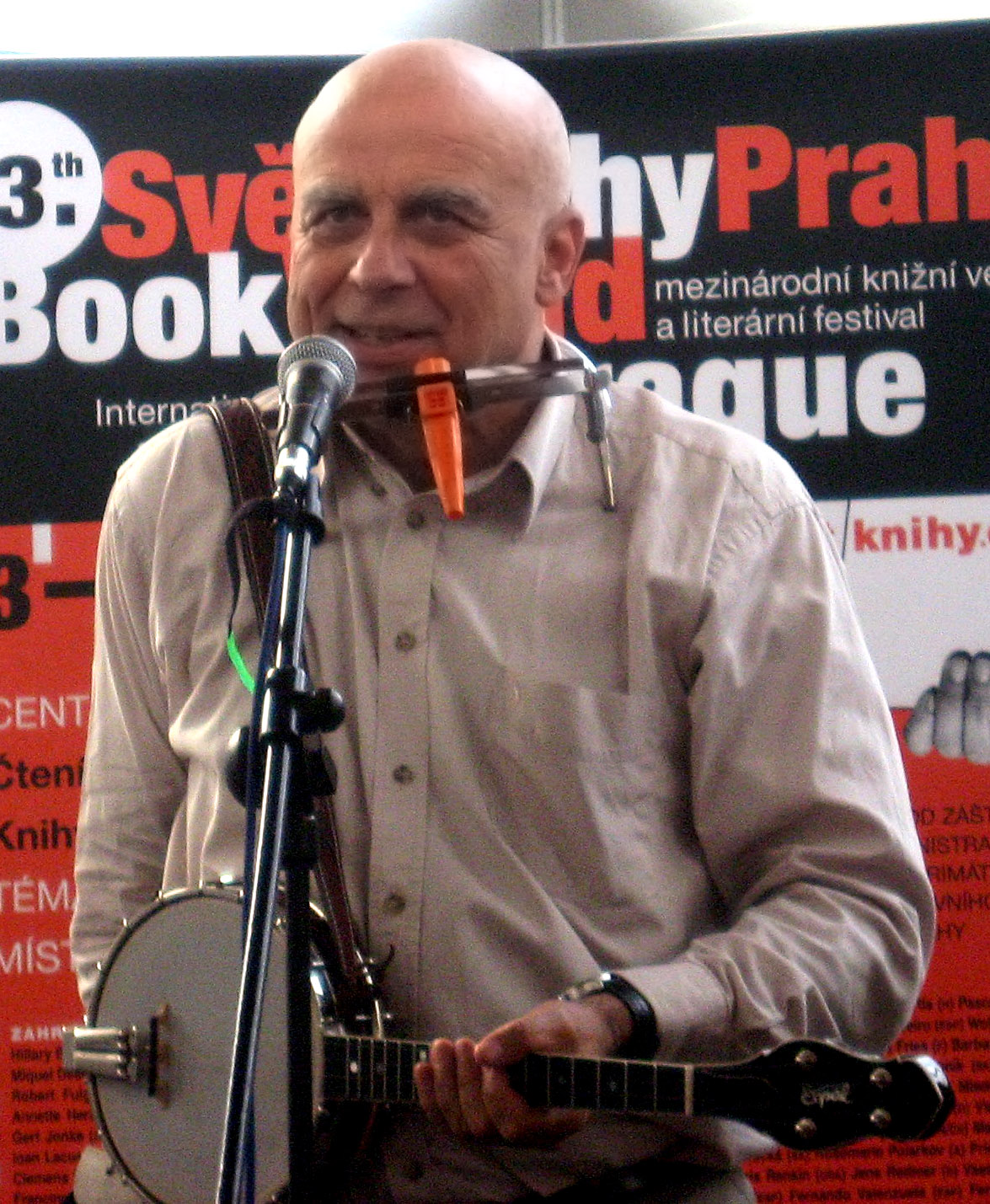
Mládek performing in 2007

Mládek is credited with designing the "Guitariano", a guitar-shaped synthesizer. In place of strings, keys are arranged on the fretboard of the instrument, their pitch corresponding to the pitch of a string depressed at the same fret, and there are controls for automatic accompaniment on the body of the instrument.

== Comedian ==
Ivan Mládek has been a widely known comedian since the 1980s. His shows "The Country Estrada" and "ČundrCountryShow" were on Czech television for many years. Eventually "ČundrCountryShow" was cancelled. "Country Estrada" was on TV NOVA until 2005 when it was abruptly canceled. A new similar comedy show (called Evergreen Show) aired on NOVA but was short-lived. Mládek himself has since claimed that he has no plans for another show, and that no station will finance this type of show anymore Re-runs of Mládek's older shows are still regularly aired on ČT (Česká televize). His comedy routines include standup, skits, and wordless skits accompanied only by the humorous lyrics of one of his songs.

== Actor ==
Ivan Mládek has had a limited acting career, his roles being mostly minor. He has played in the Czech films "Ještě větší blbec, než jsme doufali" and himself in "Na druhé koleji". His new projects are sitcoms Cyranův Ostrov (2009), Cyranův poloostrov (2010) and later Noha 22 (2011)

== Composer and notable songs ==
Ivan Mládek has authored at least 233 songs. He writes the lyrics and music to most of his songs, which are primarily country-style songs with traces of dixieland and often contain humorous lines and puns. Many of his songs have become cultural icons in the Czech Republic. Some of them are:

- "Zkratky" — a song written almost solely with abbreviations.
- "Jožin z bažin" — possibly Mládek's best known song, which he even called the "national anthem" of his country show. In January 2008, the song became popular in Poland and Hungary, winning several radio hitparades, and later on also in Russia. In 2011 this song was made popular in Catalonia, thanks to a TV show called APM? (Alguna Pregunta Més?). The song is a surreal tale of a mysterious man-eating monster (Jožin z bažin - Joey from the Swamps) living in the swamps, who could be defeated only with use of a cropduster. This song was later covered by American thrash metal band Metallica during their concert in Prague in April 2018.In 2023, a version titled "Jorge Bagre," performed by the Só Alegria Group, made the song go viral on various social media platforms in Brazil.
- "Prachovské skály"
- "Medvědi nevědí"
- "Pochod Praha-Prčice"

== Discography ==
LP Records:

- Dobrý den! Panton 1976
- Nashledanou! Panton 1977
- Ej, Mlhošu, Mlhošu! Panton 1979
- I. Mládek uvádí L. Sobotu Panton 1979
- Přeposlední leč Panton 1980
- Guten Tag! Panton 1981
- Úterý (Oral Stories) Panton 1981
- I. Mládek zase uvádí L. Sobotu Panton 1982
- Moje rodina (+ Oral Stories) Panton 1983
- Banjo z pytle ven! Panton 1985
- Potůčku, nebublej! Panton 1986
- Ta country česká Multisonic 1989
- Pepa z Kadaně (sung by Josef Dvořák) Punc 1990
- Škola zvířátek (Dagmar Patrasová) Tommu 1991

CD:

- Ta country česká Multisonic 1991
- The Best Of Banjo Band I. Panton 1992
- The Best Of banjo Band II. Panton 1993
- Vykopávky Multisonic 1993
- Řeky (with band Zelenáči) EMG 1993
- Pohádky a jiné povídačky (stories) Monitor 1994
- V hospodě u šesti trampů BaM Music 1994
- Písničky Čundrcountry show I BaM Music 1994
- Písničky Čundrcountry show II. BaM Music 1995
- Dobrý den! (+6x bonus) Bonton 1996
- Písničky na chatu Bonton 1998
- Nashledanou! (+6x bonus) Bonton 1999
- Sweet Sue (stories Lenka Plačková) Fonia 2000
- Anekdoty do 1. i 4. cenové skupiny
- Písně o lásce a pravdě BaM Music 2000
- Do hlavy ne! Radio servis 2001
- Děda Mládek Illegal Band BaM Music
- Děda Mládek Illegal Band II. BaM Music
- Proč mě ženy nemaj rády Warner Music 2002
- Milan Pitkin v Coutry estrádě 1 Noveta
- Milan Pitkin v Coutry estrádě 2 Noveta
- V Mexiku v taxiku (Dušan Barczi) Barci Music 2002
- Dáme si eště raz! (Dušan Barczi) Barci Music 2003
- ... a vo tom to je! D. J. World 2002
- 60 nej Sony Music 2003

== Regular cast ==
Ivan Mládek has a regular cast for his shows, some members of the "Banjo Band" and some of them independent entertainers. Some of Mládek's regulars include; Ivo Pešák, Lenka Plačková, Milan Pitkin, Jan Mrázek, Vítězslav Marek, Libuše Roubychová (Libuna), Lenka "Kalamity" Šindelářová, Pavel Skalník and others.
