= George & Beatovens =

Czech rock band

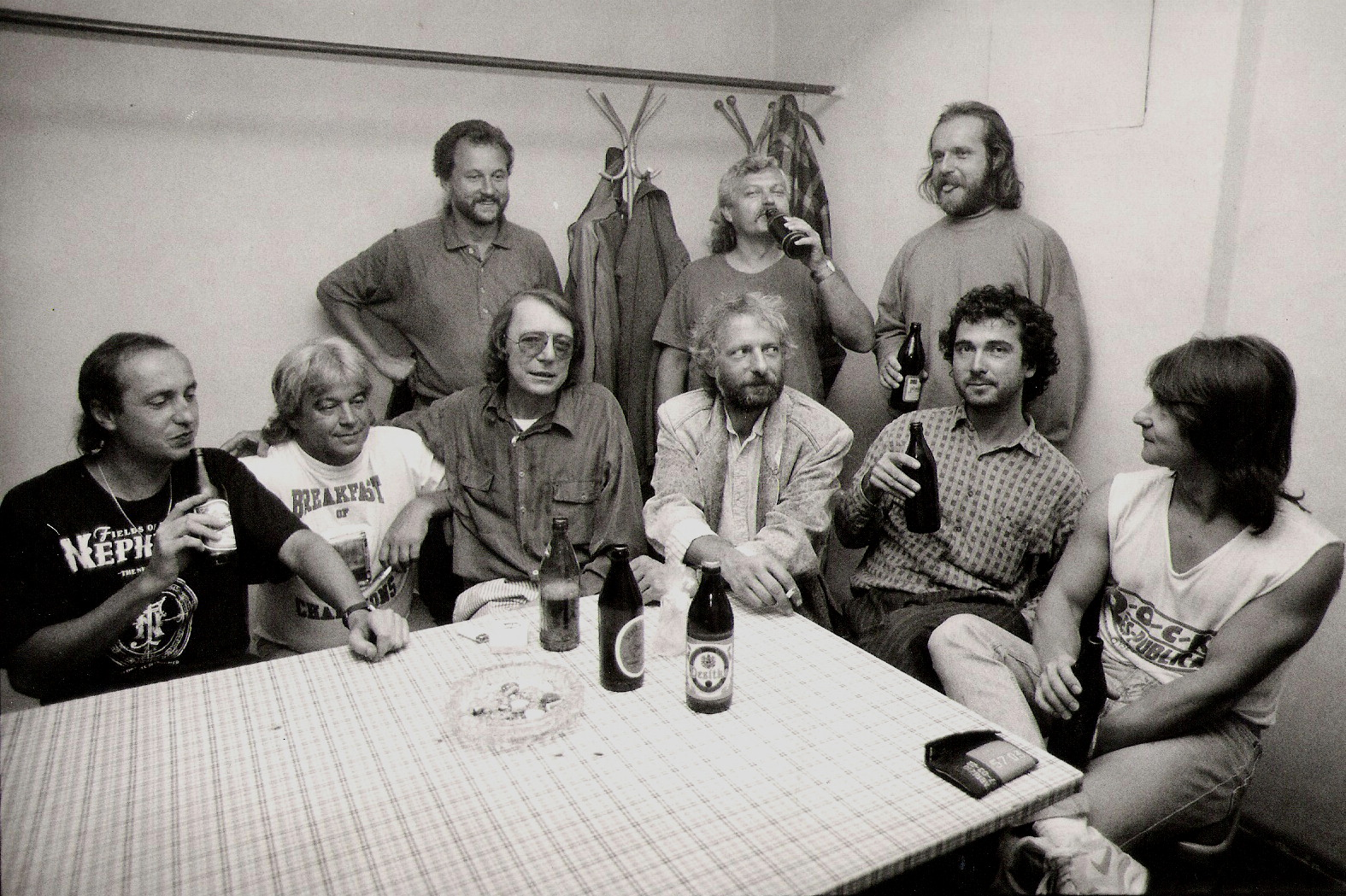
- George & Beatovens with techs in 1992

Background information
- Also known as: George and Beatovens; G&B; G+B
- Origin: Prague, Czechoslovakia
- Genres: Beat; rock; pop
- Years active: 1963–1972; 1977–present (sporadic)
- Members: Karel Kahovec; Viktor Sodoma; Michal Pavlík; Karel Novák; Petr Eichler
- Past members: Petr Novák; Michal Burian; Karel Sluka; Jiří Jirásek; Jaroslav Bednář; Miroslav Helcl; Jiří Čížek; Zdeněk Juračka; Vladimír Mišík; Jan Obermayer; Luboš Andršt; Miroslav Dudáček; Petr Bezpalec; Oldřich Wajsar; Ivan Pelíšek; Martin Rychta; Hubert Täuber; Ladislav Klein; Stanislav Staněk; Adolf Seidl

George & Beatovens is a Czech rock band, sometimes known as G&B or G+B, formed in 1963 in Prague by singer and guitarist Petr Novák. The band has released several albums and numerous singles throughout its career. They have broken up several times but remain sporadically active to this day.

== History ==
In 1963, Petr Novák, at the time playing rhythm guitar, formed a band called Beatles, as a tribute to the English quartet, together with Michal Burian (lead guitar), Karel Sluka (bass), and Jiří Jirásek (drums). This name couldn't be used for performances, however, so the band renamed themselves George & Beatovens, using Jirásek's nickname. The group recorded several demos and first presented them on Jiří Černý's radio show Dvanáct na houpačce. Their original material proved a success, but the band fell apart after Burian and Sluka left to perform military service in 1965. Novák went on to co-found Flamengo with Přemysl Černý, and Jirásek joined the group Donald.

In August 1967, George & Beatovens reformed, with Novák and Jirásek being joined by several other members of Donald, including Jaroslav Bednář on guitar, Miroslav Helcl on the organ, and Jiří Čížek on bass guitar. Bednář was replaced a year later by Zdeněk Juračka. Prolific guitarist and singer Vladimír Mišík joined the group briefly in 1968 while they were on tour in Finland, taking the place of Juračka on guitar. After returning from Finland, Helcl left and was replaced by Jan "Farmer" Obermayer (the Matadors). Luboš Andršt took over on guitar but was later substituted by Miroslav Dudáček. Saxophonist and flautist Petr Bezpalec played with the group between 1970 and 1971.

After recording the albums Kolotoč svět (1970), Modlitba za lásku (1970), and Ve jmenu lásky (1971), George & Beatovens again ceased to exist in 1972. Petr Novák went on to launch a solo career, with a stint at Semafor theatre in Prague.

Between 1973 and 1979, Novák recorded with the Bohuslav Janda Group, some of whose members later formed the basis of the renewed George & Beatovens. The group became active again in 1979, performing under the abbreviated name G+B, or G&B. At this point, however, they were mainly Novák's backing band, with a rotating cast of musicians that included bassists Oldřich Wajsar and Karel Novák, drummers Ivan Pelíšek, Martin Rychta, and Hubert Täuber, keyboardist Ladislav Klein, as well as guitarists Stanislav Staněk and Adolf Seidl. After 1990, the band briefly regrouped in its original lineup from the late 1960s, and since 1993, the ensemble has included guitarist and singer Karel Kahovec, who took over on lead vocal duties after Novák's death in 1997.

Presently, the band performs only occasionally, with a lineup that includes keyboardist Michal Pavlík and drummer Petr Eichler.

== Band members ==
Current

- Karel Kahovec – guitar, vocals
- Viktor Sodoma – vocals
- Michal Pavlík – keyboards
- Karel Novák – bass
- Petr Eichler – drums

Former

- Petr Novák – vocals, guitar (1963–65; 1967–72; 1979–1997)
- Michal Burian – lead guitar (1963–65)
- Karel Sluka – bass (1963–65)
- Jiří Jirásek – drums (1963–65; 1967–71)
- Jaroslav Bednář – guitar (1967–68)
- Miroslav Helcl – organ (1967–68)
- Jiří Čížek – bass (1967–71)
- Zdeněk Juračka – guitar (1968)
- Vladimír Mišík – guitar, vocals (1968–69)
- Jan "Farmer" Obermayer – organ (1968–71)
- Luboš Andršt – guitar (1969)
- Miroslav Dudáček – guitar (1969–71)
- Petr Bezpalec – saxophone, flute (1970–71)
- Ladislav Klein – keyboards (1977–90)
- Oldřich Wajsar – bass (1979–82)
- Ivan Pelíšek – drums (1979)
- Stanislav Staněk – guitar (1979–?)
- Adolf Seidl – guitar (1981–89)
- Hubert Täuber – drums (1983–89)
- Martin Rychta – drums (1988–97)

== Discography ==
Studio albums

- Kolotoč svět (1970)
- Modlitba za lásku(1970)
- Ve jmenu lásky (1971)
- Kráska a zvíře (1975)
- Co je to láska (Planeta snů) (as G&B, 1980)
- Sladké trápení (as G&B, 1982)
- Ahoj, tvůj Petr (as Petr Novák G&B, 1983)
- Zpověď (as G&B, 1985)
- Memento (as G&B, 1990)
- Dávné sliby (1996)
- Rub a líc (as Petr Novák, Karel Kahovec, George & Beatovens, 1996)
- Rock n' Roll (as Karel Kahovec, Viktor Sodoma, George & Beatovens, 2012)

Compilations

- The Greatest Hits (as Petr Novák G&B, 1984)
- 12 nej (as G&B, 1986)
- Náhrobní kámen (1996)
- Síň slávy (1999)
- Svět a nesvět 1966–1997 (2007)
- Petr Novák: Komplet 1967–1997 (Box set, 2010)

Live albums

- Petr Novák Live (1992)
