= Luboš Andršt =

Czech guitarist (1948–2021)

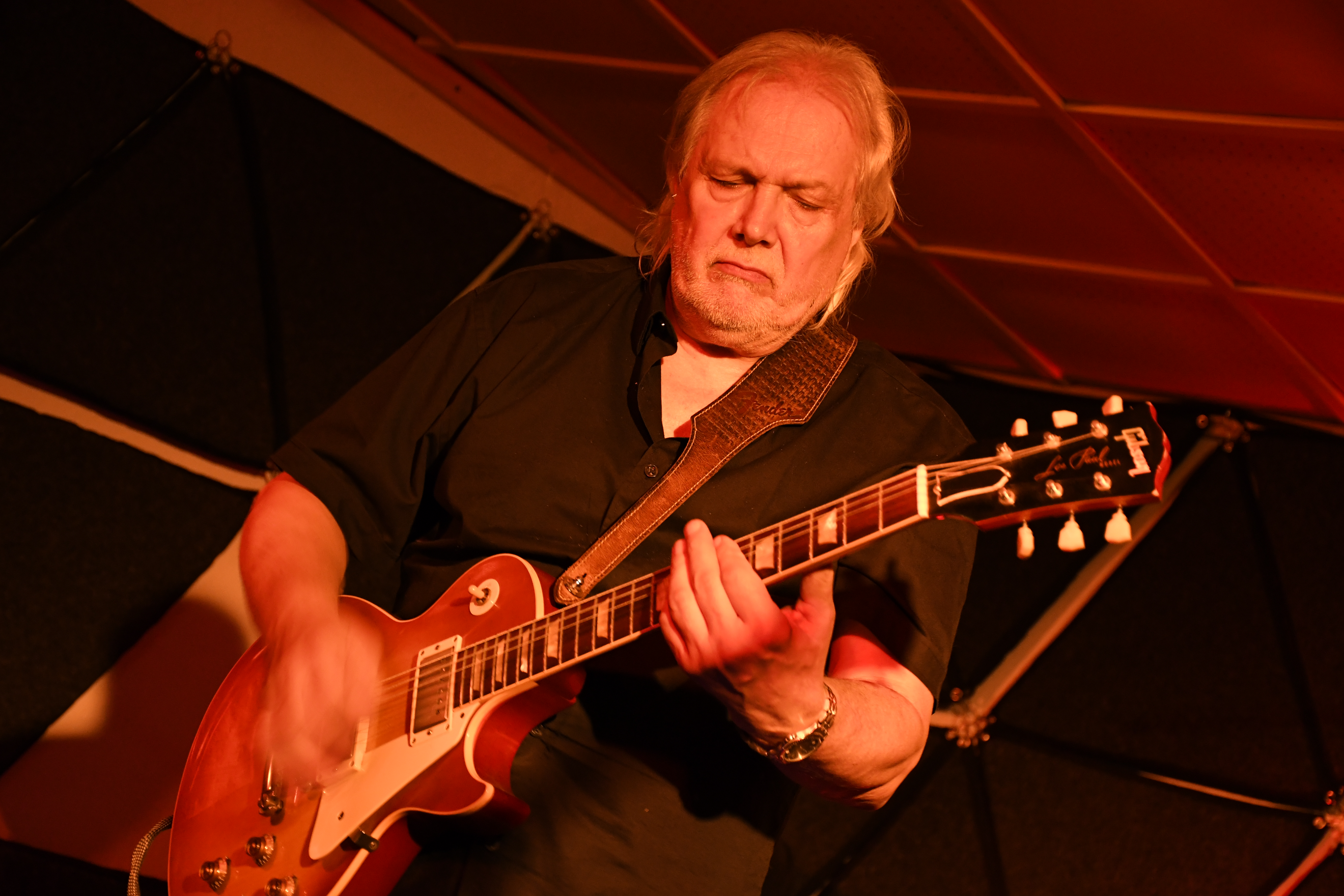
- Andršt in 2019

Background information
- Born: 26 July 1948; Prague, Czechoslovakia
- Died: 20 December 2021 (aged 73)
- Genres: Blues rock; jazz rock; rock
- Occupations: Musician
- Instruments: Guitar
- Formerly of: Jazz Q; Energit; George & Beatovens; Framus Five; Luboš Andršt Blues Band; Luboš Andršt Group; Nu-Trio
- Website: lubosandrst.cz

Luboš Andršt (26 July 1948 – 20 December 2021) was a Czech jazz fusion, rock, and blues guitarist, composer, producer, and guitar teacher. Known primarily for his electric rock-influenced guitar playing, he frequently played acoustic guitar on jazz fusion recordings in the 1970s. Since the late 1990s, he was best known as a key figure in the Czech blues and blues rock scene with his Luboš Andršt Blues Band, and shared the stage with a number of American blues musicians, including B.B. King.

His father was Czech ice hockey player and executive Zdeněk Andršt. His cousin Petr Janda is the longtime frontman of the beat band Olympic.

== Life and career ==
=== Jazz Q, Energit: 1960s–70s ===
Andršt began playing the guitar at the age of 14, being self-taught. He founded his first band, the Roosters, in 1966, and followed this by stints in various groups, including George & Beatovens and the early Framus Five rendition in 1970, with whom he recorded the album Město ER in 1972. In the early 1970s, he was a member of Martin Kratochvíl's Jazz Q and recorded the 1973 album Pozorovatelna with them. Also in 1973, he co-founded a new jazz fusion band, Energit, with two former members of Flamengo, Ivan Khunt and Jaroslav Erno Šedivý, and Vladimír Padrůněk from Jazz Q. In 1977, Andršt played on the album V Holomóci městě by Emil Viklický, another member of Energit. Andršt returned to Jazz Q in 1977, and recorded the album Zvěsti with the band. The Energit album Piknik followed a year later.

=== Solo album, Blues Band: 1980s ===
The year 1980 was a significant milestone in Andršt's musical career. He recorded his first solo album, Capricornus, dissolved Energit, and at the beginning of 1981, founded his own blues group, Luboš Andršt Blues Band, with Slovak vocalist Peter Lipa. Also in 1981, Andršt recorded the double album Divergencie with Slovak group Collegium Musicum. After Peter Lipa left the Blues Band in 1987, Andršt split his musical endeavours once more. He rejoined Michal Prokop's Framus Five and recorded the 1989 album Snad nám naše děti… with the group. Together with Jan Hrubý and Prokop, he formed the acoustic ensemble Nu-Trio. He also recorded his second solo album, Plus-Minus Blues (1988), with the group Krátké spojení.

=== After communism: 1990s–2021 ===
After the 1989 fall of communism in Czechoslovakia and the subsequent changes this brought to cultural life in the country, Andršt accepted an offer to join the backing band of singer Marta Kubišová, who had until then been politically persecuted. The result of this collaboration was the 1991 album Někdy si zpívám. In 1992, the guitarist relaunched his Blues Band. From 2000, he played and recorded with Michal Prokop and Jan Hrubý once more. In 2013, the trio performed at the Chicago Blues Festival.

Andršt later performed with his bands Luboš Andršt Group, Luboš Andršt Blues Band, and Prokop, Andršt, Hrubý Trio, as well as with Framus Five and Energit.

He died on 20 December 2021, at the age of 73.

== Partial discography ==
Solo albums

- Capricornus (1981)
- Plus-Minus Blues with Krátké spojení (1988)
- Imprints (1992)
- Luboš Andršt s přáteli, Live 25 let s Blues live album (1996)
- Acoustic Set live album (1996)
- Man with a Guitar (1999)
- Blues Grooves – Pure Electric Blues (2004)
- Luboš Andršt Group – Moment in Time (2008)
- Blues Alive & Well live CD/DVD (2011)
- One Man Blues (Best of) compilation album (2013)

with Framus Five

- Město ER (1972)
- Snad nám naše děti… (1989)
- Odněkud někam compilation album (2000)
- Poprvé naposledy (2006)
- Live 60 live album (2007)
- Sto roků na cestě (2012)
- Krásný Ztráty Finále (2014)

with Jazz Q

- Pozorovatelna (1973)
- Zvěsti (1978)

with Energit

- Energit (1975)
- Piknik (1978)
- Time's Arrow (Luboš Andršt & Energit) (2017)

with Emil Viklický

- V Holomóci městě (1977)

with Collegium Musicum

- Divergencie (1981)

with Luboš Andršt Blues Band

- Blues z lipového dřeva (1984)
- Škrtni, co se nehodí (1987)
- Blues Office (1988)
- Luboš Andršt Blues Band featuring Ignatz Netzer & Tonya Graves (1996)
- Blues Time with Ramblin Rex (1998)
- Everything I've Done with Reesie Davis (2007)

with Michal Prokop and Jan Hrubý

- Unplugged – Live (2005)

with Marta Kubišová

- Někdy si zpívám (1991)
