= The Matadors =

Czechoslovak rock band

- Origin: Prague, Czechoslovakia
- Genres: Rhythm and blues; beat; rock and roll
- Years active: 1965–1968; 1991–2008
- Labels: Supraphon
- Spinoffs: Emergency; Blue Effect
- Spinoff of: Pra-Be; Komety
- Past members: Wilfried Jelinek; Otto Bezloja; Radim Hladík; Jan Obermayer; Vladimír Mišík; Miroslav Schwarz; Karel Kahovec; Viktor Sodoma; Miloš Vokurka; Jiří Matoušek; Petr Netopil; Michail Vračko

The Matadors were a beat band from Prague, Czechoslovakia active between 1965 and 1968, and intermittently between 1991 and 2008. Their most memorable lineup consisted of Otto Bezloja (bass guitar), Radim Hladík (lead guitar), Jan "Farmer" Obermayer (organ), Miroslav "Tony Black" Schwarz (drums), Karel Kahovec (vocals, rhythm guitar), and Vladimír Mišík (vocals, blues harp). The latter two were replaced in 1966 by ex-Flamengo vocalist Viktor Sodoma. The Matadors released only one studio album during their career, the 1968 self-titled The Matadors, shortly before the band's breakup.

== Career ==
The Matadors originally formed in early 1965 under the name Fontána. The band had coalesced a year prior from two other groups: Pra-Be ("Praha - Berlín"), made up of Czechoslovak and German students, and Komety. Pra-Be gave Fontana bassist Otto Bezloja and organist Jan "Farmer" Obermayer, while guitarist Radim Hladík and vocalist Vladimír Mišík came from Komety.

Fontána's manager and former drummer, Wilfried Jelinek, who had been replaced on drum duties by Miroslav "Tony Black" Schwarz, secured the band a promotional deal with Demusa, an East German manufacturer of sound equipment and music instruments. Since the group began to use an electronic organ named Matador, they changed their name accordingly, to promote it. The Matadors performed exclusively in East Germany until April 1966, their live repertoire consisting mostly of cover versions of songs by beat groups such as the Who, the Kinks, or the Small Faces.

In the spring of 1966, the group returned to Czechoslovakia and took on a second vocalist and guitarist, Karel Kahovec. Later that year, Mišík left to perform military service. Kahovec also departed the band, joining Flamengo, whose vocalist, Viktor Sodoma, traded places with him in the Matadors.

The most successful Matadors lineup split up in the summer of 1968, shortly after releasing their debut studio album, the self-titled The Matadors. The group had received an offer to perform as the house band on a German edition of the musical Hair. Hladík, Obermayer, and Sodoma refused the offer and chose to leave instead. They were replaced by ex-Komety lead singer Miloš "Reddy" Vokurka, Jiří Matoušek on keyboards, and Petr Netopil and Michail Vračko on guitars. Together with Otto Bezloja and Tony Black, the band moved to Munich. In the early 1970s, the nucleus of that band evolved into the Germany-based progressive rock group Emergency.

Radim Hladík went on to establish Blue Effect (later also known as Modrý Efekt or M Efekt) with the original Matadors lead singer, Vladimír Mišík. Jan Obermayer joined Petr Novák's George and Beatovens. Viktor Sodoma pursued a solo career as a pop singer, backed by various groups and orchestras. Best remembered was his 1971–1973 collaboration with Shut Up, later known as the František Ringo Čech Group, with whom he recorded numerous "bubble-gum" singles and one side of his only solo album.

The Matadors reunited in 1991 and made rare public appearances until 2008.

Otto Bezloja died in 2001, Radim Hladík in 2016.

== Band members ==
- Wilfried Jelinek – drums
- Otto Bezloja – bass guitar
- Radim Hladík – lead guitar
- Jan "Farmer" Obermayer – organ
- Vladimír Mišík – vocals, rhythm guitar, blues harp
- Miroslav "Tony Black" Schwarz – drums
- Karel Kahovec – vocals, rhythm guitar
- Viktor Sodoma – vocals
- Miloš Vokurka – vocals
- Jiří Matoušek – keyboards
- Petr Netopil – guitar
- Michail Vračko – guitar

== Discography ==
- The Matadors (EP, 1966)
- The Matadors (EP, 1967)
- The Matadors (LP, 1968)
- Matadors Live 1966 (Live album, 2008)
- Classic (Compilation, 2010)
