= Vladimír Padrůněk =

Czech musician (1952–1991)

- Born: 17 February 1952; Prague, Czechoslovakia
- Died: 30 August 1991 (aged 39); Prague, Czechoslovakia
- Genres: Rock; jazz; jazz fusion
- Occupation: Musician
- Instrument: Bass guitar
- Years active: 1971—1988
- Formerly of: Jazz Q; Energit; Etc...; Abraxas

Vladimír Padrůněk (17 February 1952 – 30 August 1991) was a Czech jazz and rock bass guitarist. He is known for his work with the groups Jazz Q, Energit, Etc..., Abraxas, and others.

== Biography ==
Padrůněk began playing bass guitar at the age of fourteen. Before that, he studied the violin at school. His first major musical engagement was in the group Exit, in 1969–1970. This is where he first met Luboš Andršt and Slávek Janda. His fame increased dramatically in the early 1970s as he began to play with the band Jazz Q, which was led by Martin Kratochvíl. In 1973, he recorded two albums with Jazz Q - Pozorovatelna (Watchtower) and Symbiosis. The band planned to tour overseas, but due to his father's previous involvement in the political upheaval of 1968, Padrůněk was forbidden to travel to non-communist countries. He had to be replaced on tour each time the band played in the West.

Another important stage of Padrůněk's musical career was the band Energit. This ensemble also included Luboš Andršt, as well as Jaroslav Erno Šedivý and Emil Viklický. In 1974, he formed Etc... with another member of Energit, Vladimír Mišík. They released their self-titled first album in 1976. Around this time, he also participated in several other projects, including Ota Petřina's first album, Super-robot (1978). The same year, Padrůněk left Etc... and returned to Jazz Q.

One of the most difficult periods of Padrůnek's life began in the early 1980s. His ailing health was exacerbated by constant problems with the Communist regime. He was diagnosed with multiple sclerosis, and he struggled with alcoholism. In the spring of 1981, he briefly played with Slávek Janda's Abraxas. His health, however, deteriorated sharply and he stopped playing for the next three years. In 1985, he returned to music, appearing with the group Moby Dick (later Dux). In 1988, he withdrew again, this time definitively. His recordings with Dux are included on the album In memoriam Vladimíra Padrůňka (1992).

Padrůnek died in August 1991. In 2012, he was posthumously inducted into the Czech rock hall of fame, Beatová síň slávy.
