= Jan Hrubý =

Czech musician (born 1948)

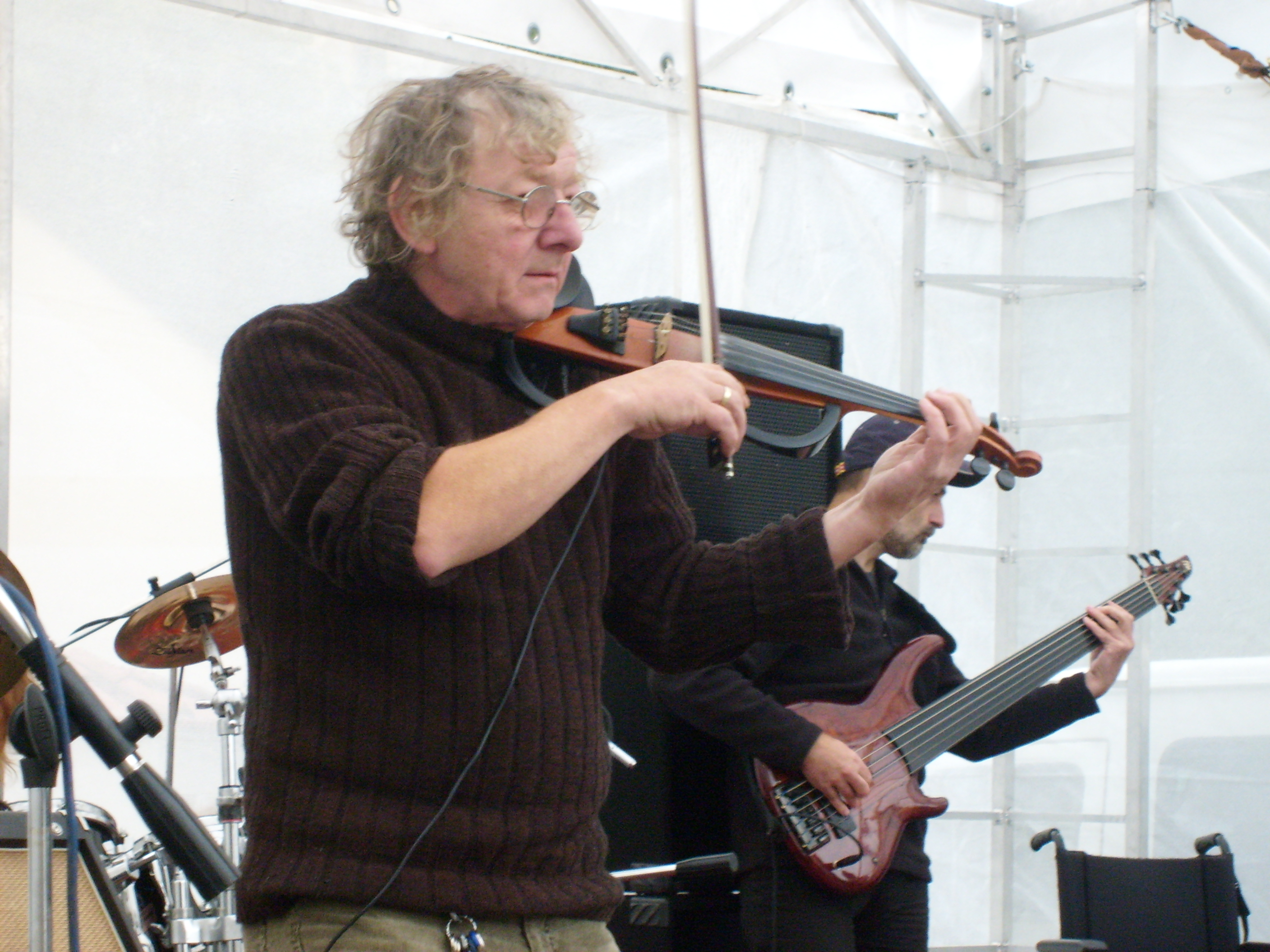
- Hrubý performing with Etc... in 2007

Background information
- Born: 3 December 1948 (age 76); Prague, Czechoslovakia
- Genres: Rock; celtic rock; folk rock; blues rock
- Occupation: Musician
- Instrument(s): Violin, bass guitar
- Member of: Čundrgrund; Nu-Trio; Kukulín
- Formerly of: Reciprocity; Etc...; Luboš Andršt's Blues Band; Framus Five

Jan Hrubý (born 3 December 1948) is a Czech rock violinist known primarily for playing with the bands Etc..., Framus Five, and Kukulín.

== Life and career ==
Hrubý was born in Prague in 1948. Between 1964 and 1968, he studied violin at the Prague Conservatory, then went on to play bass and later violin in the group Reciprocity. From 1975 until Vladimír Mišík's performance ban by the Communist government in 1982, he played with the singer's band Etc.... In 1983, he joined Luboš Andršt's Blues Band and a year later, he became a member of Michal Prokop's Framus 5 and significantly influenced the album Kolej Yesterday. When Mišík was able to return to the stage in 1985, Hrubý rejoined Etc..., though only for a year and a half, before returning to Framus 5. Since 1987, he has also played with Prokop and Andršt in an acoustic trio formerly known as Nu-Trio.

Hrubý has also been a member of Čundrgrund with Mišík, Vladimír Merta, and Petr Kalandra, as well as collaborating with Dagmar Andrtová-Voňková and recording with Jazz Q, Marsyas, C&K Vocal, Hana Hegerová, and others. In the 1990s, he was influenced by celtic music and founded the group Kukulín.

In 2012, Hrubý took part in Merta's revived project Dobrá úroda, recording the album Nikdo v zemi nikoho.

In January 2014, he released the album Společné světy with English harpist Sean Barry.

== Partial discography ==
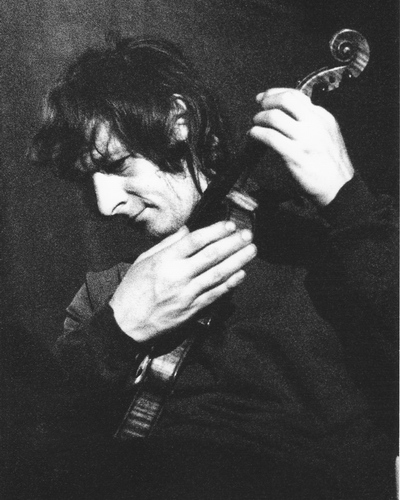
Hrubý performing with Čundrgrund, circa 1977–78

- Cesta na severozápad (1992)
- Arthur's Stone (Jan Hrubý, Peter Mustill, and Kukulín – 1993)
- Burning Rose (Jan Hrubý, Peter Mustill, and Kukulín – 1994)
- Černý ovce (Jan Hrubý, Michal Prokop, Petr Skoumal, Peter Mustill – 1997)
- Středozem (Jan Hrubý and Kukulín – 1998)
- The Best of… (Jan Hrubý and Kukulín – 2000)
- Stará vlna (Pastorální svita) (2000)
- Cesty… (2001)
- Mezidobí (2002)
- Silmarillion (Jan Hrubý and Kukulín – 2003)
- Unplugged – Live (Michal Prokop, Luboš Andršt, and Jan Hrubý – 2005)
- The Habit of Perfection (Maria Hoffman and Jan Hrubý – 2006)
- Včerejší Vydání (Vladimír Merta and Jan Hrubý – 2011)
- Nikdo v zemi nikoho (Dobrá úroda – 2012)
- Společné světy (Jan Hrubý and Sean Barry – 2014)
- 7 (Jan Hrubý and Kukulín – 2015)
- Příběhy v čase (2017)
- V rozpitých barvách (Radim Hladík, Jaroslav Hutka, Jan Hrubý, Petr Přibyl – 2017)
- S nebem to mám dobrý (Vladimír Mišík, Radim Hladík, and Jan Hrubý – 2017)
