= Joe Kučera =

Czech musician

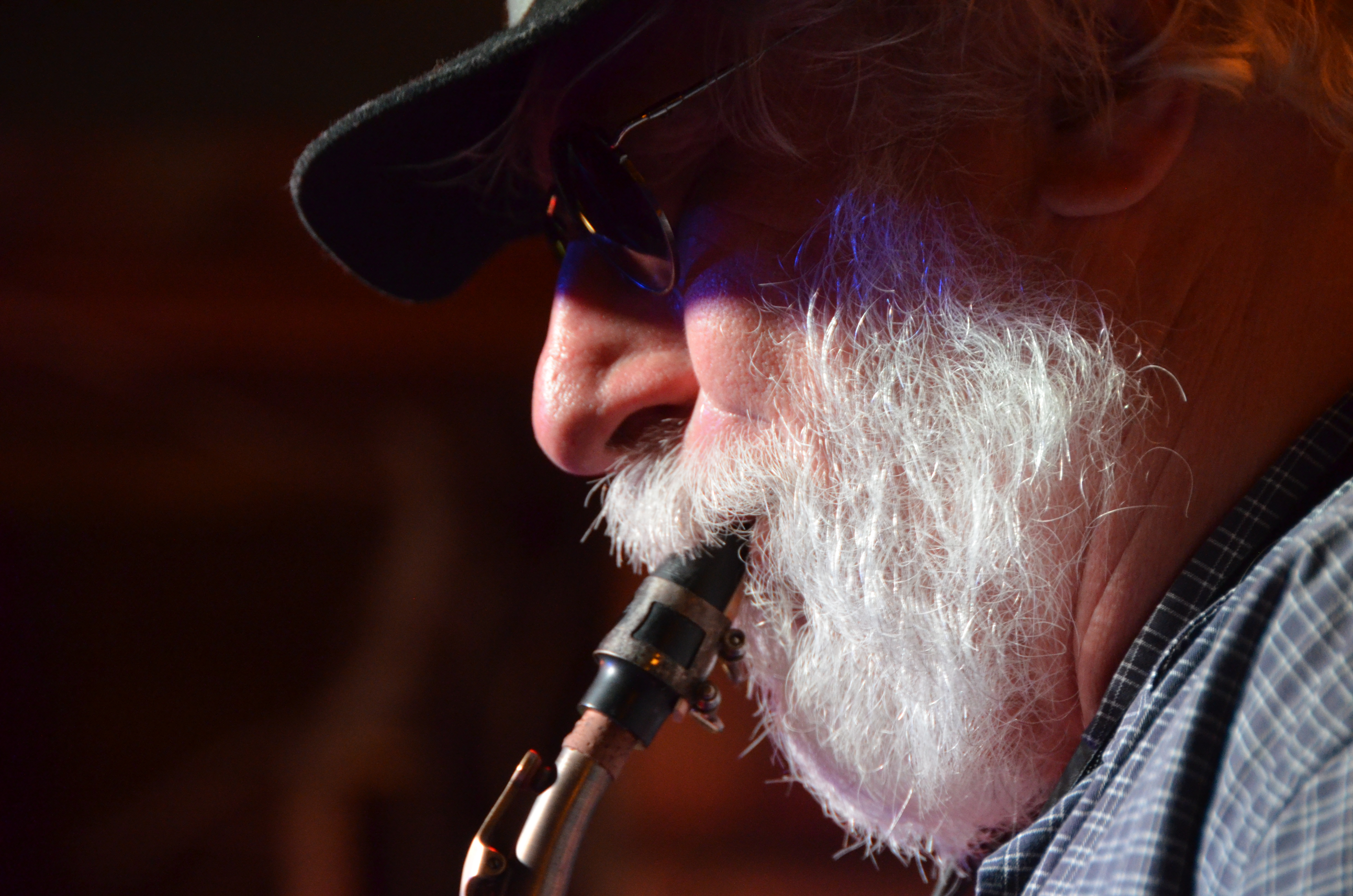
- Joe Kučera in 2016

Background information
- Birth name: Josef Kučera
- Born: 8 July 1943 (age 81); Prague, Protectorate of Bohemia and Moravia
- Genres: Jazz
- Occupation: Musician
- Instrument(s): Saxophone, flute
- Website: Official website

Joe Kučera (born Josef Kučera; 8 July 1943) is a Czech jazz saxophonist and flautist.

He was born in Prague in Protectorate of Bohemia and Moravia (now the Czech Republic). He began playing clarinet at age of seventeen and later changed his instrument to saxophone and flute. Since 1967, he played with Michal Prokop's band Framus Five and two years after, he emigrated to Austria with fellow jazz musician Sammy Vomáčka. Later he went to Berlin. He worked with many musicians, such as Jackie Leven, Werner Lämmerhirt and many others. He founded jazz festival Jazz Meeting Berlin in 1997.

== Discography ==
=== As leader ===
- Balance (1986)
- Dillema (1998)
- Memories/Looking Back (2017)

=== As sideman ===
With Jesse Ballard

- Livin' Like Fire (1977)
- Jesse Ballard's Paradise Island Band (1998)
- Talkin' to the Rain (2003)
- Constantly in View (2007)
- Cut It All Loose (2014)

With Jasmine Bonnin

- Keine Angst (1979)

With Paul Esslinger

- Journey to Mandalonia (1987)

With Hans Hartmann

- Swindia (1984)

With Nino Hilmann

- No Identity (1980)

With Ikarus

- Solaris (1982)

With Werner Lämmerhirt

- White Spots (1978)
- Crossroads (1982)
- SaitenZauber (1999, Stockfisch)
- Heimspiel (2003, Toca Records)

With Jackie Leven

- Control (1975 LP)
- Great Songs from Eternal Bars (2001)

With Spinning Motion

- Confidence in the Future (1980)

With Michal Prokop

- Blues in Soul + 9x Bonus (1995)
