= Petr Janda (musician) =

Czech musician (born 1942)

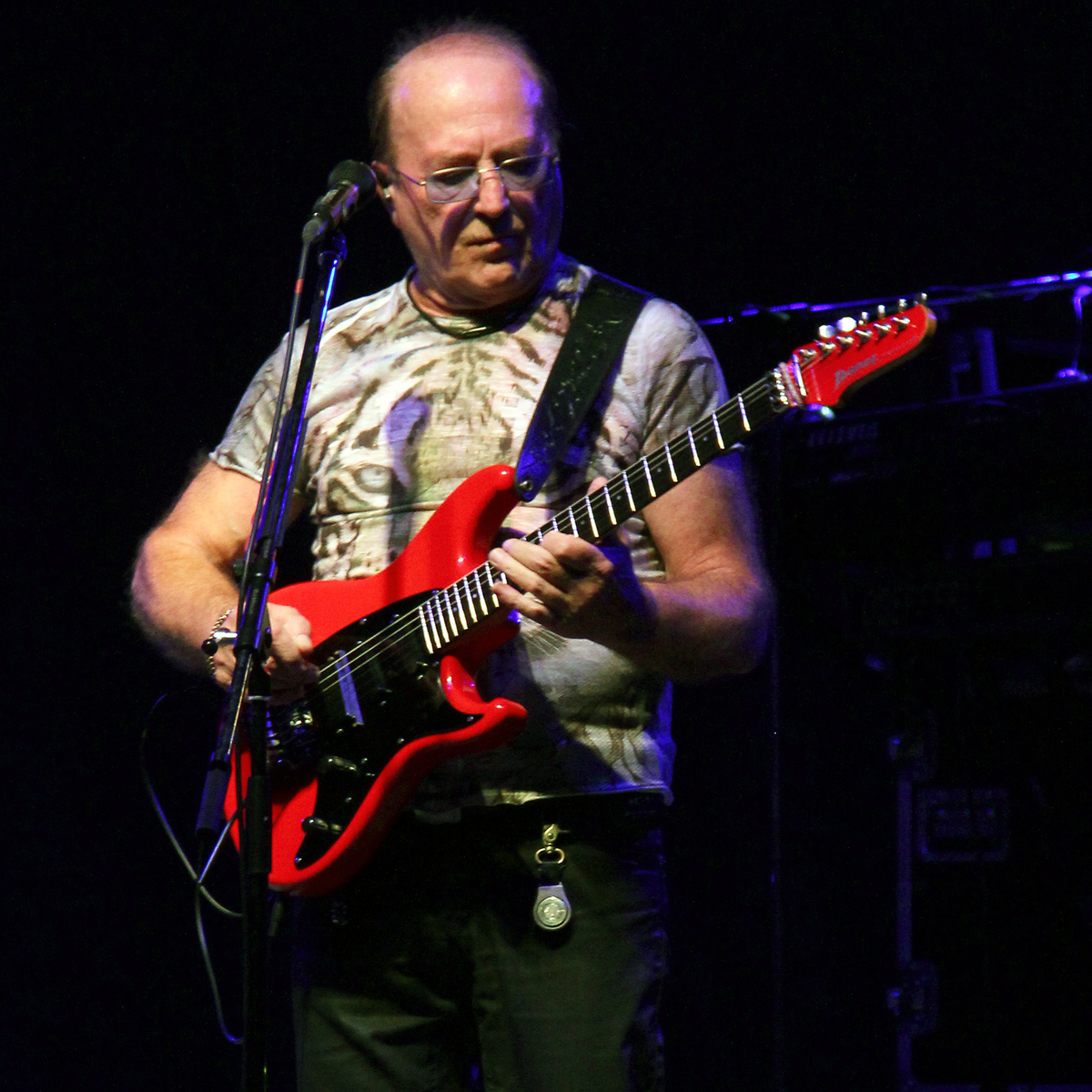
- Janda performing in 2014

Background information
- Born: 2 May 1942 (age 84); Prague, Protectorate of Bohemia and Moravia
- Genres: Big beat; rock
- Occupations: Musician; songwriter
- Instruments: Vocals; guitar
- Years active: 1950s–present
- Member of: Olympic
- Formerly of: Sputnici; Big Beat Quintet; Karkulka; 3 Guitars
- Spouses: Jana Jandová (m. 1966/67–1991†); Martina Jandová; Alice Jandová (m. 2005)
- Children: 5, including Marta Jandová
- Relatives: Slávek Janda (brother); Luboš Andršt (cousin)

Petr Janda (born 2 May 1942) is a Czech musician from Prague. He has been the frontman of the rock band Olympic since 1963. He has released three solo studio albums and one with Petra Janů. Janda is the father of singer Marta Jandová, the brother of musician Slávek Janda, and the cousin of guitarist Luboš Andršt.

== Biography ==
=== Early life ===
Petr Janda was born on 2 May 1942 in Prague, which was at the time part of the Nazi-occupied Protectorate of Bohemia and Moravia. After high school, he studied at the Jaroslav Ježek Conservatory.

=== Music ===
Janda began his musical career playing guitar in the band Sputnici in the late 1950s and early 1960s. He went on to play with Big Beat Quintet, where he met bassist Pavel Chrastina and drummer Jan Antonín Pacák. In 1963, he joined the big beat band Olympic, which had been cofounded by Chrastina a year earlier. Pacák joined the group in 1965, by which point, Janda had become its frontman and lead vocalist.

In 1998, Janda released his debut solo album, titled Co je dobrý a co zlý. Ten years later, in 2008, he issued his second solo record, Jednou jó, jednou né, which included the track "Dotyky Slávy", a duet with his daughter Marta Jandová, penned by Aleš Brichta.

=== Other ventures ===
In 2004, Janda unsuccessfully ran for the Czech Senate in the Kutná Hora District as a non-partisan candidate for the Independents.

=== Personal life ===
Janda's first wife, Jana Jandová, died in 1991 of cancer. They had two children, including Marta Jandová, a popular singer who represented the Czech Republic in the 2015 Eurovision Song Contest, along with Václav Noid Bárta. His second wife was presenter Martina Jandová, with whom he has a daughter. His third wife is Alice Jandová (née Fojtíková), with whom he has two daughters.

Janda is the brother of musician Slávek Janda, frontman of the rock band Abraxas, and the cousin of guitarist Luboš Andršt.

In 2016, he received the Silver Medal of the President of the Senate. In 2024, he was awarded the Medal of Merit, 1st degree, for services to the state in the field of art.

== Discography ==
=== with Olympic ===
Further information: Olympic discography

- Želva (1968)
- Pták Rosomák (1969)
- Jedeme jedeme (1971)
- Olympic 4 (1973)
- Marathon (1978)
- Prázdniny na Zemi (1980)
- Ulice (1981)
- Laboratoř (1984)
- Kanagom (1985)
- Bigbít (1986)
- Když ti svítí zelená (1988)
- Ó jé (1990)
- Dávno (1994)
- Brejle (1997)
- Karavana (1999)
- Dám si tě klonovat (2003)
- Sopka (2007)
- Back to Love (Previously unreleased album, recorded in France in 1969) (2011)
- Souhvězdí šílenců (2013)
- Souhvězdí drsňáků (2014)
- Souhvězdí romantiků (2015)
- Trilobit (2018)
- Kaťata (2020)
- Bombarďák (2025)

=== Solo ===
Studio albums

- Co je dobrý a co zlý (1998)
- Jedeme dál II with Petra Janů (2000)
- Jednou jó, jednou né (2008)
- Asi se mi nebude chtít (2022)

Compilations

- Ještě držím pohromadě – Best of (2017)

Video albums

- Petr Janda V Berklee (2017)
- Django film soundtrack, with Olympic (2024)

Contributions

- Kulhaví Poutníci (1996)
- Hello, Dolly! (1997)
- 3 Guitars – 3 Guitars, Jazz Luboš Andršt, Classic Lubomír Brabec, Rock Petr Janda (2004)
- Rockové Vánoce (2008)
- Laco Déczi – Symphonic Ballads (2016)

== Bibliography ==
- Janda, Petr (2011). Dávno. Prague: Ikar. ISBN 978-80-249-1660-6.
- Janda, Petr (2012). Olympic 50. Prague: Knižní klub. ISBN 978-80-242-3737-4.
