= Life After Life (band) =

American gypsy punk band

- Origin: San Francisco, United States
- Genres: Punk rock, psychedelic rock
- Years active: 1993–1998
- Labels: Alternative Tentacles
- Past members: Jim Čert; Jaroslav Erno Šedivý; David Mullen Perkins; Robley Richard Evans; Andy A. Pollack; J.T. Schmeckie

Life After Life was an American self-described gypsy punk band (also referred to as a psychedelic punk band), active from 1993 to 1998 and based in San Francisco. The group featured Jim Čert, a Czech accordion-playing folk singer and Jaroslav Erno Šedivý, a Czech drummer noted for his collaborative work with the Plastic People of the Universe, and four American musicians involved in the Bay Area rock scene.

== History ==
Čert and Šedivý, active on the Czech music scene in the 1980s, were known for their dissent against the communist regime in that country. Both were jailed several times for making music deemed "anti-social" by the government, who would not let musicians perform without state approval. However, files found in 1989 show that Čert was secretly working under police pressure as an informant.

When the two musicians found themselves in the United States in the early 1990s, after the Velvet Revolution, they decided to start a band with local musicians. The original Life After Life lineup debuted on New Year's Eve, 1993, as a five-piece.

The band caught the attention of San Francisco musician and political activist Jello Biafra, former frontman of the hardcore punk band Dead Kennedys and head of the Alternative Tentacles record label. Biafra enthusiastically signed them, excited to have found "a S.F. band with a totally unique sound". The group debuted with the single "Harrahya", before releasing an album titled Just Trip. The material on these two releases consisted of songs written by Čert, including "Marijuana", with lyrics by pro-marijuana activist David Peel. As a bonus track, Just Trip also included a cover of Willie Nelson's "Still Is Still Moving to Me", featuring Biafra on lead vocals, originally released on the Nelson tribute album Twisted Willie.

Life After Life disbanded in 1998, when Čert returned to Prague. Talk of a reunion arises occasionally.

== Discography ==
Releases

- "Harrahya" / "Doors" (7" single, 1995)
- Just Trip (LP, 1997)

Compilation appearances

- The Day the Needles Stood Still ("Harrahya", "Doors", and "Mexico", from 7" sessions)
- Twisted Willie ("Still Is Still Moving to Me")
