= Zmijovka =

Traditional Czech knitted wool cap

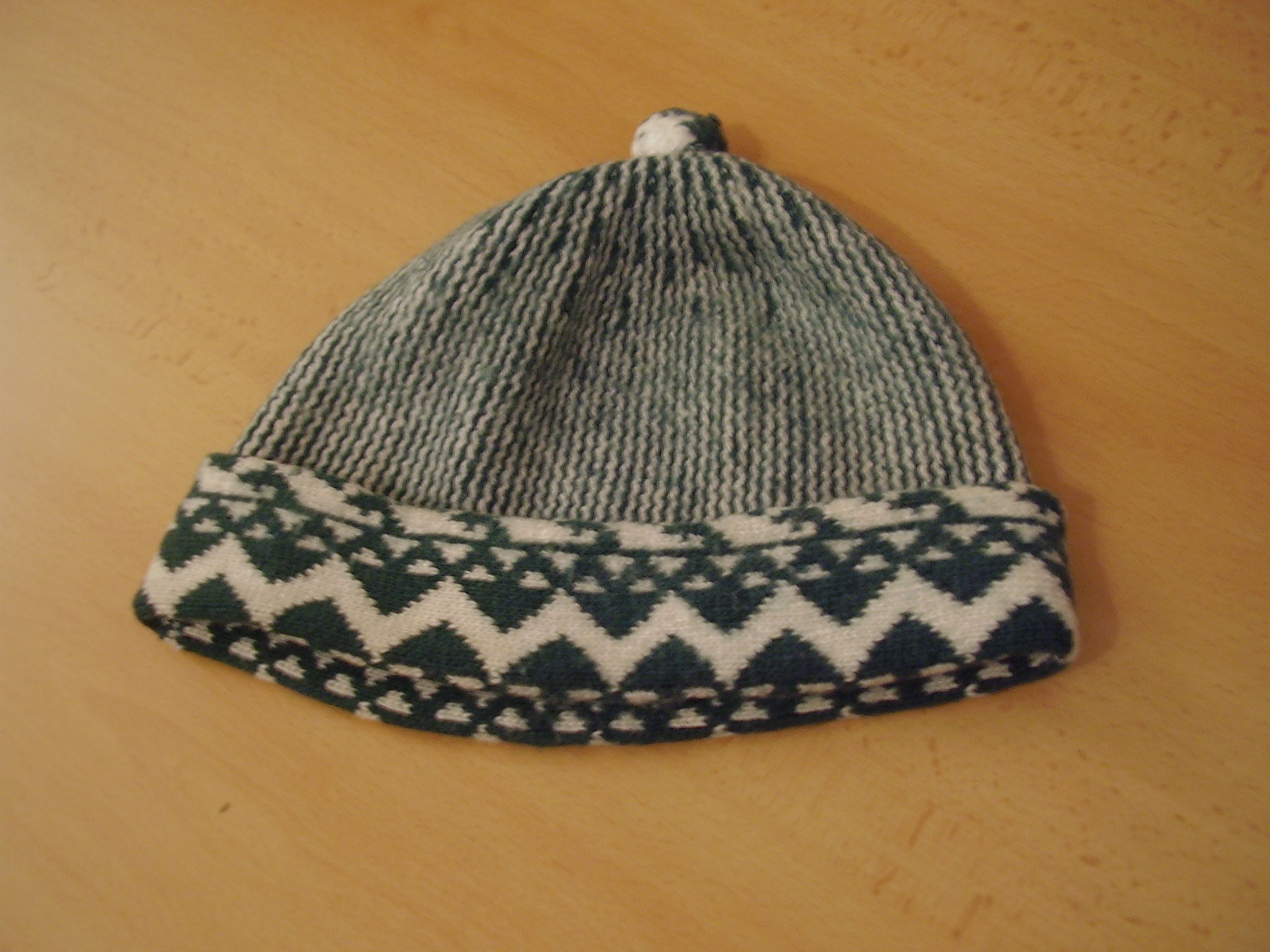
Zmijovka

The zmijovka (or zmijovec, in Slovakia known as budajka) is a traditional Czech knitted wool cap with no bill, encircled with a cuff and topped by a small pom-pom. The crown of the cap is characterized by thin stripes radiating from the pom-pom at the centre. The most traditional colour scheme for a zmijovka (including for its pom-pom) is two-tone, with one of the colours being white and the other being black, brown, or red. Knitted into the cuff is a pattern in which smaller zig-zags are predominated by a large central zig-zag. The zig-zag is quite angular and reminiscent of the pattern on the back of the common European viper called zmije in Czech. Therefore the hat is commonly called zmijovka ("the viper thing"), or less often hadovka from the more general Czech word for "snake" which is had.

The zmijovka is said to have originated while what is now the Czech Republic was part of Austria-Hungary. It was and is generally identified with rural life, and it has been most closely associated with perambulating butchers (especially those that visited farms to butcher hogs on site), innkeepers, fishmongers, and later truck drivers. In the Czech Republic, it is still sold in work-wear and uniform stores, as well as in hat stores.

In recent years, the zmijovka has enjoyed a resurgence in popularity and notoriety. It has been featured on characters in a number of films, including the Oscar-nominated My Sweet Little Village, and it has been seen on celebrities from punk folk accordionist Jim Čert to former prime minister Vladimir Špidla. It is available these days in many more colours than the most traditional ones, although it is almost always still two-tone in the Czech Republic. Its most spectacular growth in popularity, (sometimes attributed to its suitability where there are marked temperature differentials between day and night), has been in West Africa, especially in Senegal and Nigeria. There, psychedelic rainbow colour schemes have triumphed over two-tone traditionalism and have been a key aspect of Africans’ making the Zmijovka their own.

In Slovakia, zmijovka is known under the popular name budajka, and it is viewed as one of symbols of Velvet Revolution, as it was worn in cold November days by one of leaders of revolution, Ján Budaj.
