= Etc (band) =

Czech rock band

Etc…
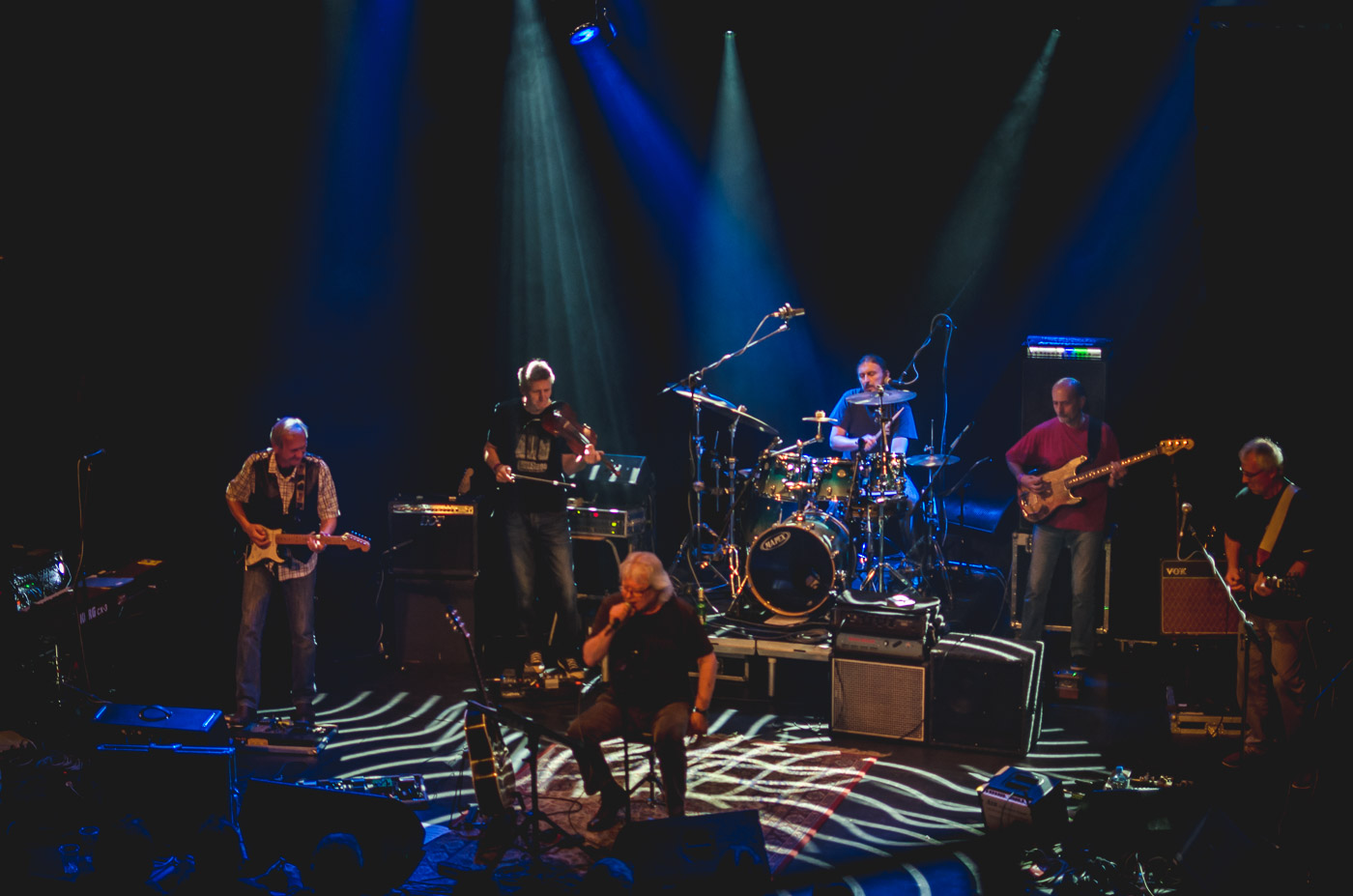
- Etc… performing in 2015

Background information
- Origin: Prague, Czechoslovakia
- Genres: Rock
- Years active: 1974–1982, 1985–present
- Labels: Bonton Music; Supraphon; 100PROmotion; Galén
- Members: Vladimír Mišík; Petr Pokorný; Pavel Skála; Jiří Veselý; Jiří Zelenka; Vladimír Pavlíček
- Past members: Vladimír Kulhánek; Jan Hrubý; Vladimír Padrůněk; Anatoli Kohout; František Francl; Jiří Jelínek; Petr Skoumal; Stanislav Kubeš; Jaroslav Olin Nejezchleba; Ivan Kadaňka
- Website: vladimirmisik.cz

Etc... is a Czech rock band from Prague, formed in 1974 by singer and guitarist Vladimír Mišík. Various musicians have rotated through the group's ranks, including violist Jan Hrubý (Framus Five), bassist Jiří Veselý (Stromboli, Žlutý pes), guitarist Petr "Kulich" Pokorný (Framus Five, Žlutý Pes), drummer Ivan Kadaňka, bassist/cellist Jaroslav Olin Nejezchleba, as well as bassists Vladimír Padrůněk and Vladimír Guma Kulhánek.

Between 1982 and 1985, the group was banned from performing by the Communist government.

In 2010, Etc... was inducted into the Beatová síň slávy (Beat Hall of Fame) and released the album Ztracený podzim.

In 2011, the group, minus Vladimír Mišík, released a collaboration album with Vladimír Merta, titled Ponorná řeka.

== Band members ==
Current

- Vladimír Mišík – guitar, vocals
- Petr "Kulich" Pokorný – guitar
- Pavel Skála – guitar, vocals
- Jiří Zelenka – drums, vocals
- Vladimír Pavlíček – violin
- Jiří Veselý – bass

Past

- Vladimír Guma Kulhánek – bass
- Jan Hrubý – violin
- Vladimír Padrůněk – bass
- Jaroslav Olin Nejezchleba – double bass, cello
- Ivan Kadaňka – drums
- Pavel Novák – bass
- Anatoli Kohout
- František Francl
- Jiří Jelínek
- Petr Skoumal
- Stanislav Kubeš

== Discography ==
- Etc… (1976; also known as Stříhali dohola malého chlapečka)
- They Cut Off the Little Boy's Hair (1978; English version of Etc…)
- Etc… 2 (1980)
- Etc… 3 (1987)
- Etc… 4 (1987)
- Jiří Jelínek in memoriam (1987)
- 20 deka duše (1990)
- Nechte zpívat Mišíka (1991; live recording)
- Jen se směj (1993)
- Unplugged (1994; live recording)
- Město z peřin (1996)
- Nůž na hrdle (1999)
- Umlkly stroje (2004)
- Archa + hosté (2008)
- Déja vu (1976–1987) Box I. (2009; set of remastered first four albums)
- Ztracený podzim (2010)
- Déja vu (1989–1996) Box II. (2010; second set of four remastered albums)
- Ponorná řeka (2011; with Vladimír Merta)
