= Kuře v hodinkách =

Studio album by Flamengo
- Released: 1972
- Recorded: 28 October 1971 – 16 March 1972
- Studio: Studio Dejvice, Prague, Czechoslovakia
- Genre: Prog rock
- Length: 46:36
- Label: Supraphon; Gramofonový Klub; 13 Jan 1287 (stereo); 0 13 1287 (mono)
- Producer: Hynek Žalčík

Kuře v hodinkách is the only studio album by the Czechoslovak rock band Flamengo. Its title is usually translated to English as "Chicken in the Watch", as depicted on the album cover. The record was released on the Supraphon label in 1972. Poet Josef Kainar wrote most of the lyrics, except for the song "Stále dál", which was penned by producer Hynek Žalčík. The recording was banned by the Communist regime under Normalization, and the band broke up shortly after.

== Track listing ==
1. "Kuře v hodinkách (introdukce)" (Jan Kubík) – 2:28
2. "Rám příštích obrazů" (Vladimír Mišík, Josef Kainar) – 4:00
3. "Jenom láska ví kam" (Pavel Fořt, Ivan Khunt, Jan Kubík, Vladimír Kulhánek, Vladimír Mišík, Jaroslav Šedivý, Josef Kainar) – 2:56
4. "Já a dým" (Vladimír Mišík, Josef Kainar) – 4:46
5. "Chvíle chvil" (Jan Kubík, Josef Kainar) – 4:24
6. "Pár století" (Vladimír Mišík, Josef Kainar) – 6:33
7. "Doky, vlaky, hlad a boty" (Jan Kubík, Josef Kainar) – 4:34
8. "Stále dál" (Ivan Khunt, Jan Kubík, Vladimír Kulhánek, Hynek Žalčík) – 3:17
9. "Kuře v hodinkách" (Jan Kubík, Josef Kainar) – 5:39

== Personnel ==
- Pavel Fořt – guitar, acoustic guitar, backing vocals
- Ivan Khunt – lead vocals (track 8), organ, backing vocals
- Jan Kubík – tenor saxophone, flute, clarinet, alto saxophone, backing vocals
- Vladimír Kulhánek – bass guitar, backing vocals
- Vladimír Mišík – lead vocals (tracks 1–7, 9), congas, acoustic guitar
- Jaroslav Erno Šedivý – drums, percussion

=== Guests ===
- Petr Král – tenor saxophone (tracks 1–3)
- Vladimír Hruška – baritone saxophone (tracks 1–3)
- Ilja Bartošek – acoustic guitar (4)
- Karel Velebný – vibraphone (6)
- "Orchestra" directed by Václav Hybš
- Arrangements – Pavel Fořt
