= Flamengo (Czech band) =

Czech rock band

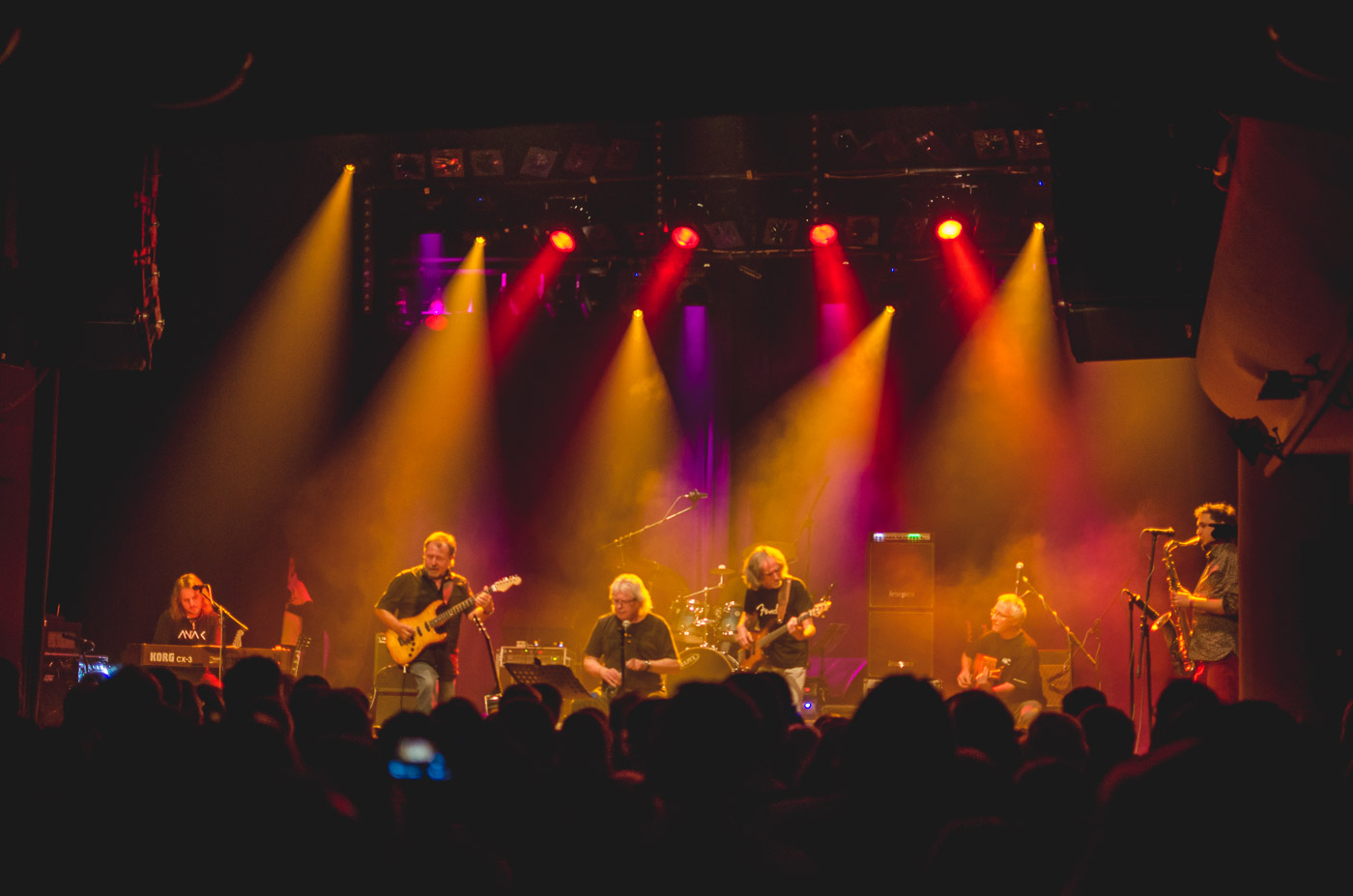
- Flamengo performing in 2015

Background information
- Origin: Czechoslovakia
- Genres: Rock
- Years active: 1966–1972; 2012–2015
- Labels: Supraphon, 100PROmotion
- Past members: Přemysl Černý; František Francl; Pavel Sedláček; Pavel Fořt; Eduard Vršek; Jiří Čížek; Petr Novák; Viktor Sodoma; Karel Kahovec; Ivan Khunt; Joan Duggan; Vladimír Mišík; Jan Kubík; Vladimír Kulhánek; Jaroslav Erno Šedivý

Flamengo was a Czech rock band established in 1966, which, at the peak of its popularity consisted of Vladimír Mišík, Ivan Khunt, Pavel Fořt, Jan Kubík, Vladimír "Guma" Kulhánek, and Jaroslav Erno Šedivý. They only released one studio album, Kuře v hodinkách, which, though banned by the authorities, went on to achieve great success in later years. Flamengo reunited for an anniversary concert in 2012 and were later inducted into the Beatová síň slávy.

== History ==
The band's original lineup consisted of Přemysl Černý (drums), František Francl (lead guitar), Pavel Fořt (rhythm guitar), Eduard Vršek (keyboard), Jiří Čížek (bass), and Petr Novák (vocals). Novák left in 1967 and was first replaced by Viktor Sodoma and later by Karel Kahovec. Newcastle singer Joan Duggan joined the group in 1969, and after she married Francl, they left the band to join Jazz Q.

Lineup changes continued, and the group's final roster was settled with the arrival of singer Vladimír Mišík, saxophonist and flautist Jan Kubík, bassist Vladimír "Guma" Kulhánek, and drummer Jaroslav Erno Šedivý. In 1971, the group recorded the album Kuře v hodinkách. Poet Josef Kainar wrote most of the lyrics, except for the song "Stále dál", which was penned by producer Hynek Žalčík. Released in 1972, the album was banned by the Communist regime under Normalization, and the band broke up shortly after.

In 2012, on the fortieth anniversary of Kuře v hodinkách, Flamengo reunited, with Mišík, Kulhánek, and Fořt. They were joined onstage at Prague's Palác Akropolis by Jiří Zelenka on drums and Pavel Skála on guitar, both Mišík's bandmates from Etc..., as well as Jakub Doležal playing the flute and saxophone, and Pavel Bohatý on vocals and keyboards. They released a live recording of the concert in 2015.

In 2013, the band was inducted into the Beatová síň slávy (Beat Hall of Fame).

== Band members ==
- Eduard Vršek – keyboards (1966)
- Viktor Sodoma – vocals (1966)
- Jiří Čížek – bass (1966–67)
- Petr Novák – vocals (1966–67)
- Karel Kahovec – vocals, rhythm guitar (1966–68)
- Přemysl Černý – drums (1966–68)
- Pavel Sedláček – vocals (1966–69)
- František Francl – lead guitar (1966–70)
- Pavel Fořt – rhythm guitar (1966–72)
- Jaroslav Erno Šedivý – drums (1968–72)
- Joan Duggan – vocals (1969–70)
- Ivan Khunt – keyboards, vocals (1969–72)
- Vladimír Mišík – vocals, guitar (1970–72)
- Jan Kubík – saxophone, flute (1970–72)
- Vladimír "Guma" Kulhánek – bass (1970–72)

== Discography ==
Albums

- Vím, že pláčem to skončí (Split, Bratislavská lýra, 1970)
- Kuře v hodinkách (1972)
- The Best of Flamengo – 1967–71 (1994)
- Paní v černém – singly 1967–72 (2003)
- Živé Kuře v hodinkách (DVD; 2015)

Singles

- "Já budu chodit po špičkách" / "Povídej" (1967)
- "Vyber si palác" / "Svou lásku jsem rozdal" (1967)
- "Náhrobní kámen" / "Paní v černém" (1967)
- "Džbán" / "Poprava blond holky" (1967)
- "Co skrýváš v očích" / "Zavraždil jsem lásku" (1968)
- "No Replay" (John Mayall cover) / "The Way for Horses" (1969)
- "Summertime" (Janis Joplin cover) / "Too Much Love Is a Bad Thing" (1969)
- "Každou chvíli" / "Týden v elektrickém městě" (1971)
- "Kuře v hodinkách" / "Stále dál" (1972)

Compilation contributions

- Bazarem proměn 1967–1976 – Flamengo, Jazz Q, Etc… (1990)
- Náhrobní kámen – Petr Novák, singly 1967–69 – Flamengo, George & Beatovens (1996)
