= Energit (band) =

Czech jazz fusion band

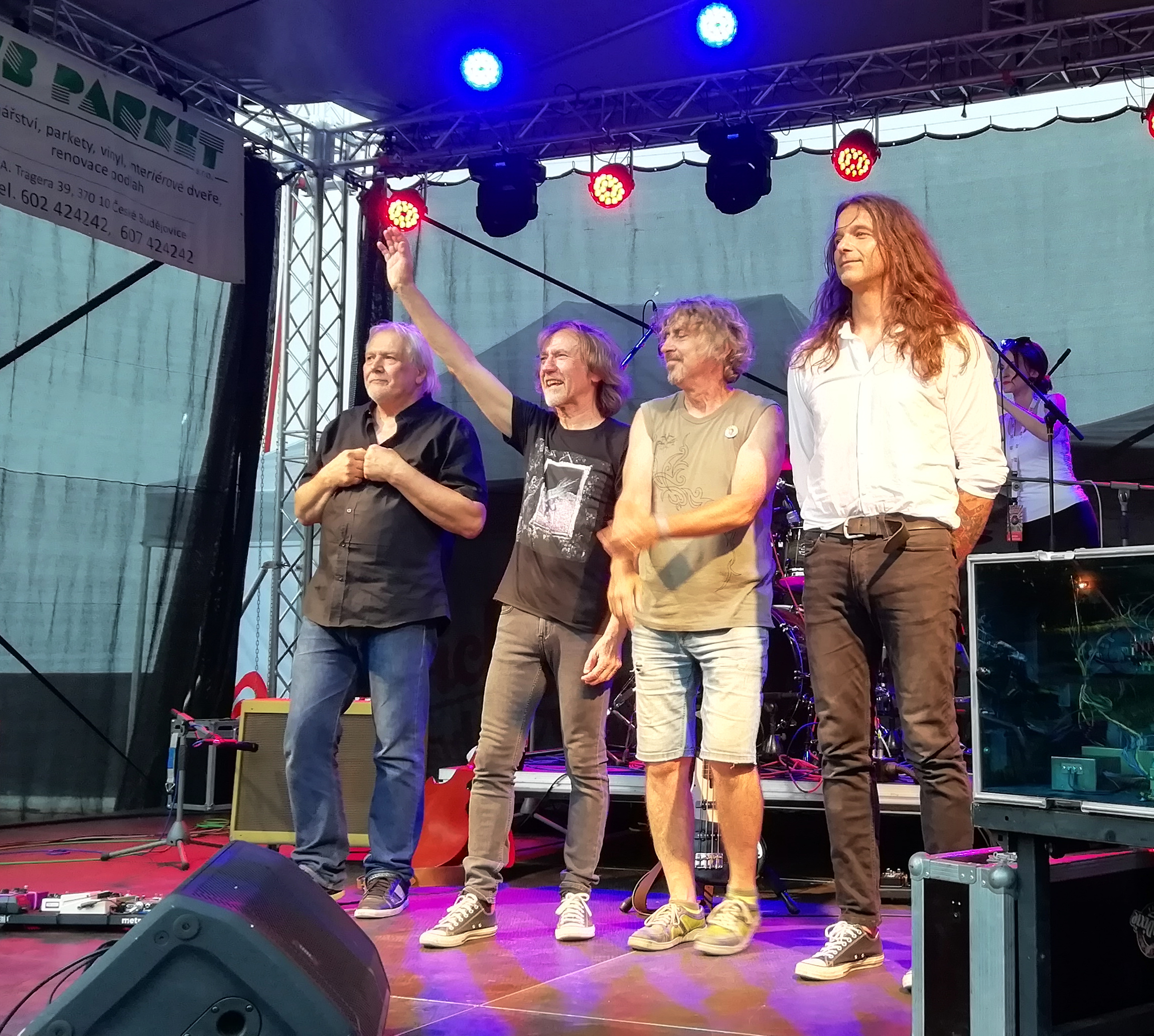
- Energit in 2019

Background information
- Origin: Prague, Czechoslovakia
- Genres: Jazz fusion, blues rock
- Years active: 1973–1980, 2006–2008, 2012–present
- Labels: Supraphon, Panton
- Members: Jiří Zelenka; Vladimír Guma Kulhánek; Jan Holeček
- Past members: Ivan Khunt; Jaroslav Erno Šedivý; Vladimír Padrůněk; Vladimír Mišík; Anatoli Kohout; Karel Jenčík; Jaromír Helešic; Jan Vytrhlík; Emil Viklický; Rudolf Ticháček; Luboš Andršt
- Website: energit-band.com

Energit is a Czech jazz fusion band from Prague founded in 1973 by guitarist Luboš Andršt, singer Ivan Khunt, drummer Jaroslav Erno Šedivý, and bassist Vladimír Padrůněk. The band's first lineup was short-lived, as that year, Šedivý and Khunt emigrated. In the mid 1970s, their sound was strongly influenced by fusion bands such as the Mahavishnu Orchestra, while also incorporating a horn section. Over the following years, the band featured a number of other musicians, including well-known Czech fusion and rock musicians such as singer Vladimír Mišík, drummer Anatoli Kohout, and pianist Emil Viklický, before disbanding in 1980. In the 2000s, Energit regrouped for live performances under the name Energit Luboše Andršta, with Andršt on electric guitar (until his death in 2021), drummer Jiří Zelenka, bassist Vladimír Guma Kulhánek, and keyboardist/singer Jan Holeček.

== Discography ==
Studio albums

- Energit (1975)
- Piknik (1978)
- Time's Arrow (2017)

EPs

- Mini Jazz Klub 6 (1976)
- Jazzrockova Dílna 2 (1977)
