= Martin Kratochvíl =

Czech musician and businessman (born 1946)

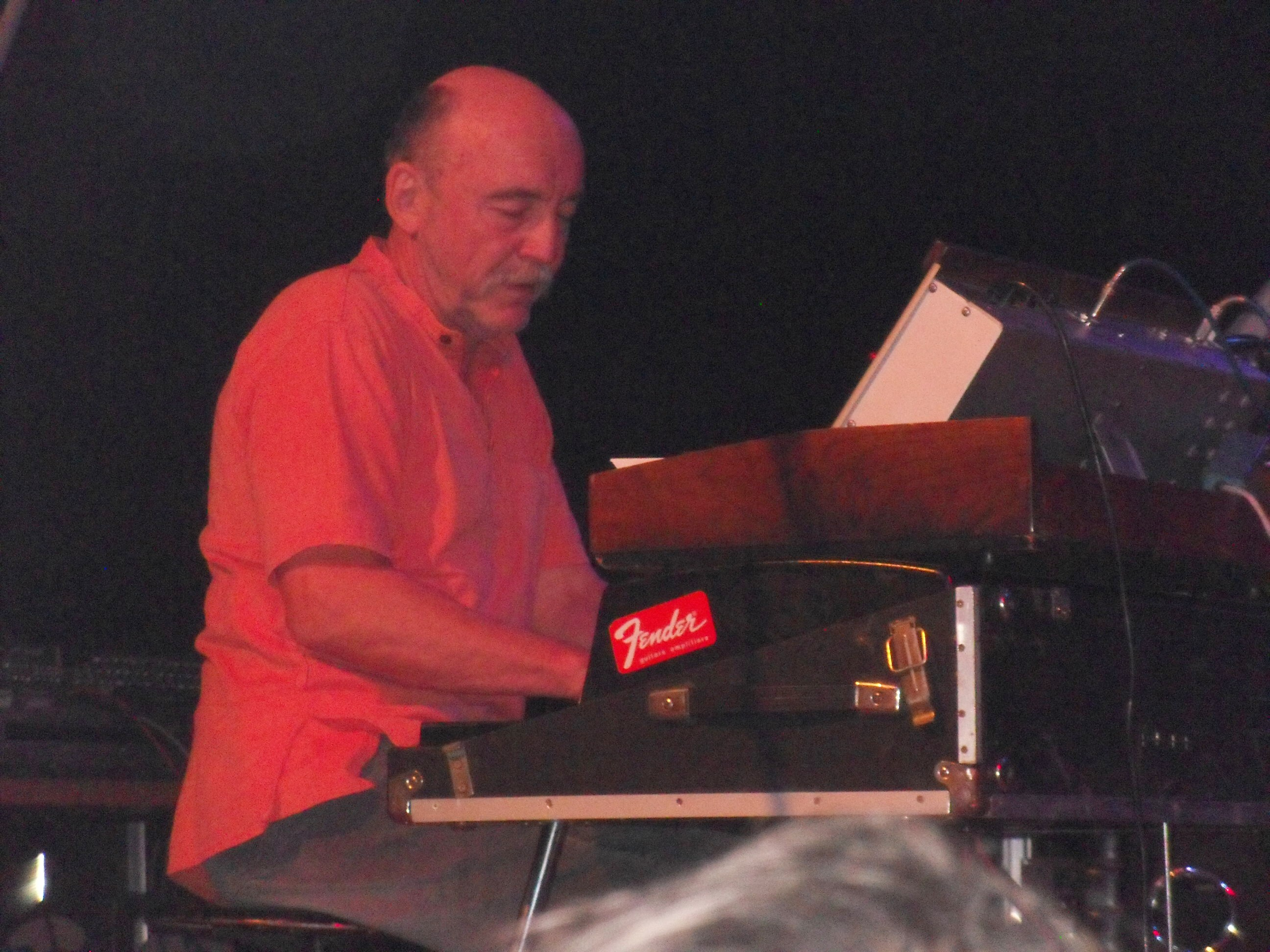
- Kratochvíl in 2011

Background information
- Born: 22 May 1946 (age 79); Prague, Czechoslovakia
- Genres: Jazz; jazz fusion
- Occupations: Musician; businessman
- Instrument: Keyboards
- Years active: 1964–present
- Member of: Jazz Q

Martin Kratochvíl (born 22 May 1946) is a Czech jazz / jazz fusion keyboardist and businessman born in Prague. He cofounded the Jazz Q quartet in 1964. During his career, he has performed in various countries around the world, launched his own record label, opened a recording studio, and released numerous albums both as a solo artist and with other musicians.

== Career ==
In 1964, Kratochvíl cofounded the band Jazz Q with flautist Jiří Stivín; the group was later rounded out by guitarist Luboš Andršt and bassist Vladimír Padrůněk during their most successful era. In 1970, they collaborated with the rock band Blue Effect on the fusion album Coniunctio. Kratochvíl has also performed and released a number of albums with American guitarist Tony Ackerman.

Being a successful musician both in Czechoslovakia and overseas, Kratochvíl saved enough money so that when the communist regime collapsed in 1989, he became a successful businessman, owner of an airport, several factories, and other ventures. The same year, he founded the record label Bonton Music. Kratochvíl also has his own recording studio, Studio Budíkov.

== Personal life ==
Kratochvíl's first wife was Magdalena Kocábová, sister of musician and activist Michael Kocáb.

== Discography ==
=== with Jazz Q ===
- Coniunctio with Blue Effect (1970)
- Pozorovatelna (1973)
- Symbiosis (1974)
- Album, Které Nikdy Nevyšlo (1975)
- Elegie (1976)
- Zvěsti (1978)
- Hodokvas (1979)
- Hvězdoň/Asteroid 1984
- 1974–75 live (1991)
- The Best of Jazz Q (1995)
- Znovu (2013)
- Živí Se Diví: Live in Bratislava 1975 (2013)
- Temné Slunce Original motion picture soundtrack (2014)
- Talisman (2016)
- Amulet (2020)

=== with Tony Ackerman ===
- Stará Známost/Old Acquaintance (1987)
- Spolu (1990)
- Chiaroscuro/Šerosvit with Vojtěch Havel (1993)
- Duolog (2001)
- Zvukobraní (2009)
- Cestou (2011)
- No Jazz with Miroslav Vitouš and Joe Kučera (2014)
- Letopis with Musa Imran Zangi (2020)
- Znění & Snění with Jana Koubková and Joe Kučera (2020)

=== Solo ===
- Piano Solo (2012)
- Himalayan Echoes II. – Soundtrack K TV Seriálu České Himálajské Dobrodružství II (2014)
- Siločáry (2017)
- Happiness Martin Kratochvíl & Friends (2017)

=== Other releases ===
- April Orchestra Milan Svoboda & Martin Kratochvíl (1979)
- Tankový Prapor Original motion picture soundtrack – contributor (1991)
