= Viktor Sodoma =

Czech singer (born 1945)

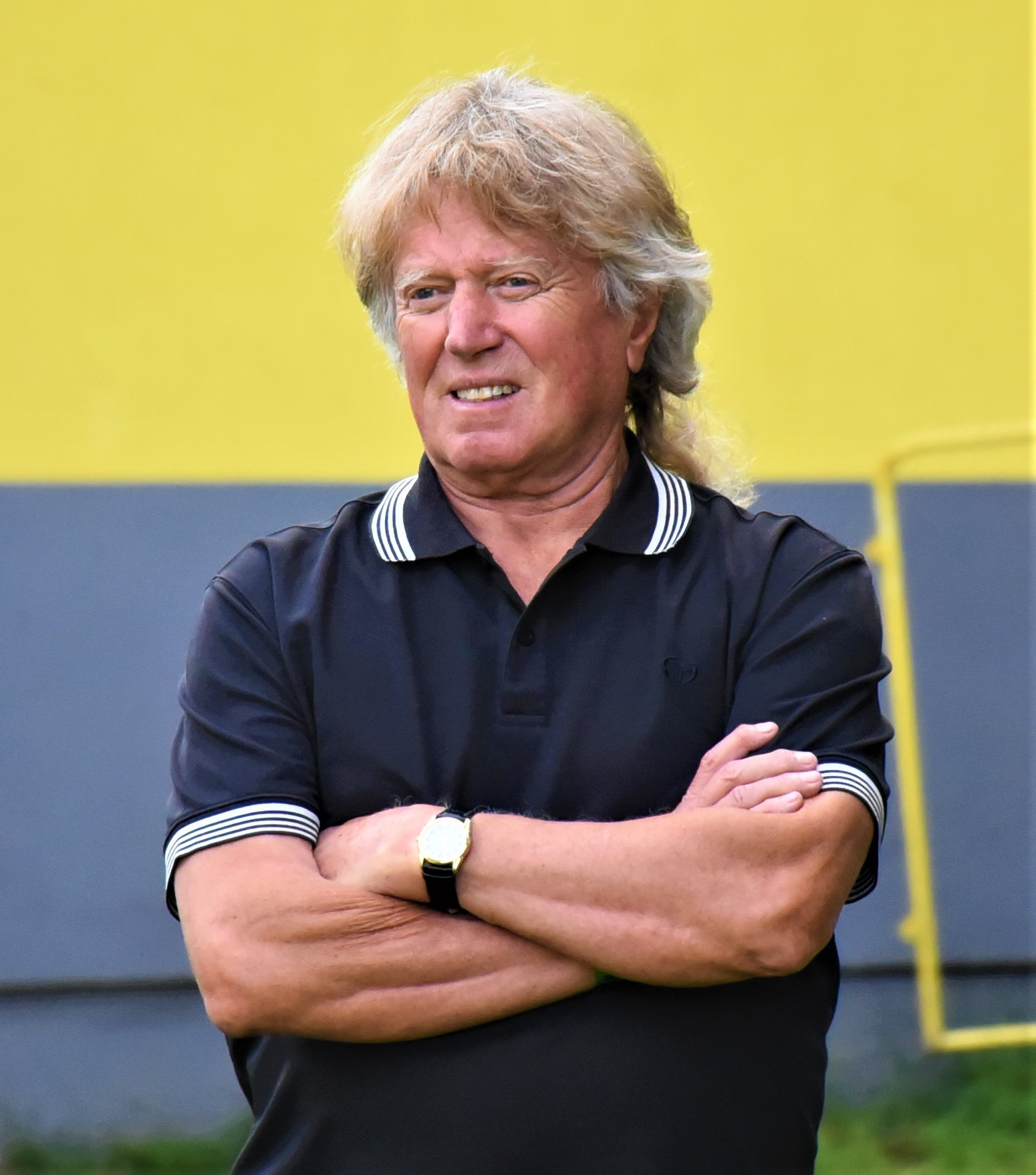
- Sodoma in 2019

Background information
- Born: 5 July 1945 (age 81); Prague, Czechoslovakia
- Genres: Rock; pop
- Occupation: Singer
- Instrument: Vocals
- Years active: 1960s–present
- Formerly of: Flamengo; Matadors; František Ringo Čech Group; George & Beatovens

Viktor Sodoma (born 5 July 1945) is a Czech singer and occasional actor, considered to be a pioneer of 1960s Czech rock and roll and beat music. He began his career by performing at Semafor theatre and during the 1960s, sang with the bands Flamengo and Matadors. After the start of the Czechoslovak Normalization period in 1968, Sodoma returned to the theatre. Between 1971 and 1973, he sang in a band called Shut Up, who originally performed at Semafor and eventually changed their name to František Ringo Čech Group. Sodoma recorded one album with the band, 1972's Haló děťátka, and was replaced a year later by Jiří Schelinger. He then sang in a group named Katapult, whose name was taken over by Oldřich Říha's group, originally named Mahagon. He has since performed in various ensembles, including George & Beatovens, as well as having a solo singing career.

== Selected discography ==
with the Matadors

- The Matadors (EP, 1966)
- The Matadors (EP, 1967)
- The Matadors (LP, 1968)

with František Ringo Čech Group

- Haló děťátka (1972)

with George & Beatovens

- Rock n' Roll (as Karel Kahovec, Viktor Sodoma, George & Beatovens – 2012)

Solo compilations

- Viktor Sodoma Zpívá Nejznámější České Hity 1 (2001)
- Viktor Sodoma Zpívá Nejznámější České Hity 2 (2001)
- Viktor Sodoma Zpívá Nejznámější České Hity 3 (2001)
- Viktor Sodoma Zpívá Nejznámější České Hity 4 (2001)
- Pop Galerie (2008)
- Země Lásky... (1968–1972) (2010)
- Snad Jsem To Já... (1973–1984) (2010)

Other albums

- Boublík (Hana Zagorová, Viktor Sodoma, Jiří Štědroň – 1970)
