= Josef Kainar =

Czech poet, playwright, and lyricist (1917–1971)

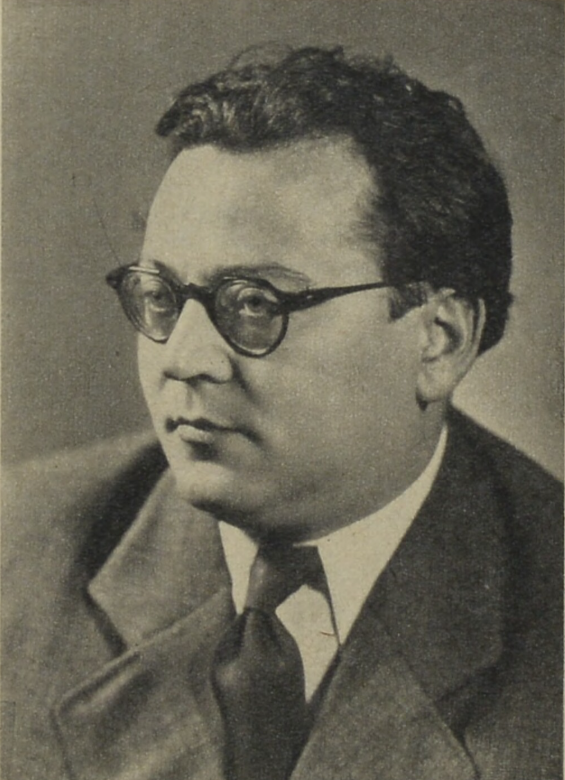
Josef Kainar

Josef Kainar (29 June 1917 in Přerov, Austria-Hungary – 16 November 1971 in Dobříš, Czechoslovakia) was a Czech poet, lyrics writer, dramatic author and translator, but also a musician, illustrator, artist and journalist. He was a member of artistic group Skupina 42 and literary group Ohnice.

== Biography ==
Josef studied Czech and French languages at Charles University in Prague between 1938 and 1939. After the closure of colleges during World War II he undertook several jobs. He worked as a script editor in Divadlo satiry. He also worked as a journalist; his jokes, images and poetry were published in the newspaper Rovnost. After the war he worked in radio, movies and the theater. For example, he created a so-called ″rozhlásky″ for the Czechoslovak Radio; this was news for younger listeners. After 1947 he devoted himself fully to literature.

He was also musically talented; he played in concerts on piano, guitar and violin. His style was based above all in jazz and he even mentions it in his poems.

His resting place is Vyšehrad cemetery.

In 2007 a high school was named in his memory in the town of Hlučín, where he studied.

== Work ==
Initially his work was influenced mainly by existentialism. Irony, even bordering on mockery, is typical to his work. His work being highly lyrical was able to connect with music; it was colloquial, sometimes even vulgar in its opposing conservatism. He aimed at keeping his verse truthful, to depict the harshness of the world and he also went even for scepticism. His poems contain short stories, which impel the reader to reflection.

Beside his literary work he wrote movie scenarios and did photography.

=== Poetry ===
- Příběhy a menší básně (1940) – His first work, of typical little stories; reflection of war and epoch
- Osudy
- Nové mýty (1946) – This collection is strongly based on the program of the artistic group Skupina 42. It contains, among others, his most famous poem Stříhali dohola malého chlapečka, which was set to music by Vladimír Mišík. He calls into question the myth of a rightful new world, being fully ironic and sarcastic; contains existentialism, absurdity and estrangement.
- Veliká láska (1950) – inspired by Vladimir Mayakovsky
- Český sen (1953) – moves from being committed; writing about history – when the Czechs had to fight for their future
- Člověka hořce mám rád (1959) – after his disillusion of communism, returns to other topics; invincible love, even though man errs and sins
- Lazar a píseň (1960) – relaxation of the regime of that time causes the language also to be loose
- Moje blues (1966) – isolation of a human, scepticism, near Nové mýty; tragicomic, burning irony

==== Poetry for children ====
- Říkadla (1948)
- Nevídáno neslýcháno (1964)
- Zlatovláska – Kainar transformed the classical fairy tale from the collection of Karel Jaromír Erben into versified drama (1952/1953). He returned to Zlatovláska to re-versify it, this time publishing it in print (1958).

=== Songs ===
In the early 40s he wrote lyrics mainly to American swing classics (George Gershwin, R. Rodgers, D. Ellington, H. Carmichael et al.). During the occupation the Nazis condemned it as "Jewish-Bolshevik filth", which was nevertheless played among the youth, particularly on tramping meetings. Kainar put some of his texts to music himself—e.g. the songs Černá kára, Starý mrtvý vrabec, Blues železničního mostu. He also wrote the lyrics to the jazz rock masterpiece Kuře v hodinkách, published by the rock band Flamengo in 1972.

He translated poetry, especially from French and German.
