= Ivan Sekyra =

Czech musician (1952–2012)

- Born: 1 October 1952; Prague, Czechoslovakia
- Died: 30 June 2012 (aged 59) Prague, Czech Republic
- Genres: Rock; heavy metal
- Occupations: Musician; songwriter; director; screenwriter
- Instruments: Guitar; vocals; violin
- Years active: 1970s–2012

Ivan Sekyra (1 October 1952 − 30 June 2012) was a Czech rock guitarist, singer, songwriter, director, and screenwriter. He learned to play the violin as a child. In 1978, he graduated from the Faculty of Mechanical Engineering at the University of Life Sciences in Prague. In 1976, he co-founded the group Abraxas. Later, he was a member of Projektil and Drakar. He eventually founded the heavy metal band Silent Garden.
