= Vladimír Kulhánek =

Czech bass guitarist (born 1944)

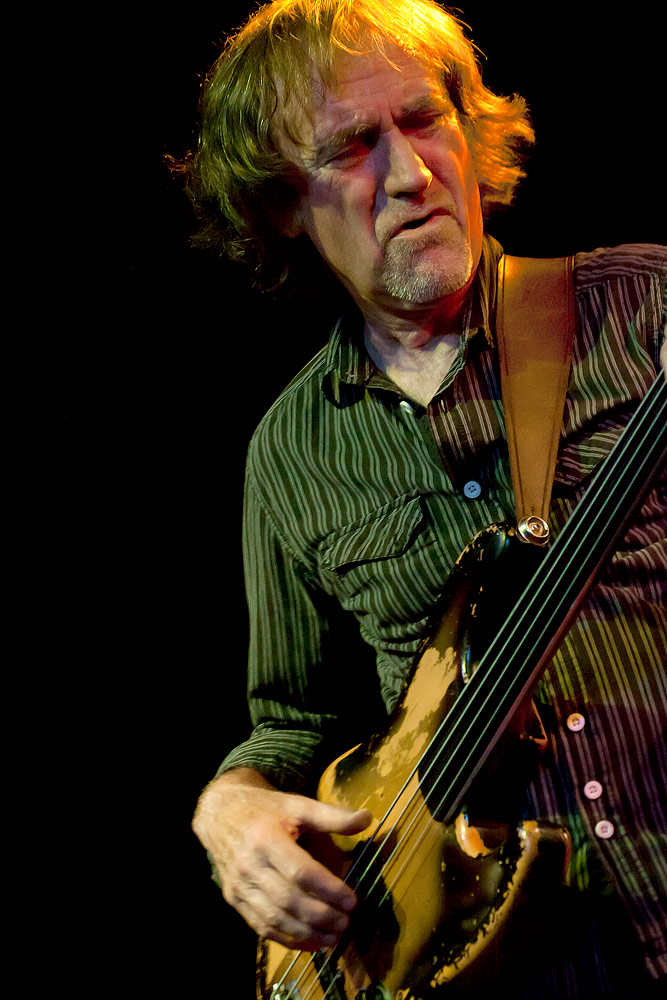

Background information
- Also known as: Guma
- Born: 4 September 1944 (age 81); Prague, Protectorate of Bohemia and Moravia
- Genres: Blues rock, pop rock, folk rock, progressive rock
- Instrument: bass guitar

Vladimír "Guma" Kulhánek (born 4 September 1944) is a Czech rock bass guitarist.

Kulhánek was born in Prague, then part of the Protectorate of Bohemia and Moravia, and studied at Institute of Chemical Technology in Prague. He was a member of Flamengo, Etc..., Stromboli, Bohemia and several other bands. He was also a sought-after session musician, playing with Dežo Ursiny, Eva Pilarová, Jana Kratochvílová, Anna K and others. He is currently a member of T4, November 2nd, Energit and a supergroup called Kulhánek/Holeček/Razím/Kowacz.

== Selected discography ==
- Flamengo: Kuře v hodinkách (1971)
- Dežo Ursiny: Dežo Ursiny & Provisorium (1973)
- Bohemia: Zrnko písku (1978)
- Stromboli: Stromboli (1987)
- Vladimír Mišík & Etc...: Etc...4 (1987)
- Vladimír Mišík & Etc...: 20 deka duše (1990)
- Vladimír Mišík & Etc...: Jen se směj (1993)
- Vladimír Mišík & Etc...: Live - unplugged (1994)
- Bratři Ebenové: Tichá domácnost (1995)
- Vladimír Mišík & Etc...: Město z peřin (1996)
- Krausberry: Šiksa a gádžo (1998)
- Bratři Karamazovi: Apokalypsa - obrazy Janova zjevení (2001)
- November 2nd: Midnight Desert (2002)
- November 2nd: Little Miss Behavin' & the Troublemakers (2005)
- T4: Pár tónů a slov (2005)
- November 2nd: Night Walk with Me (2011)
