= Vladimír Merta =

Czech musician (born 1946)

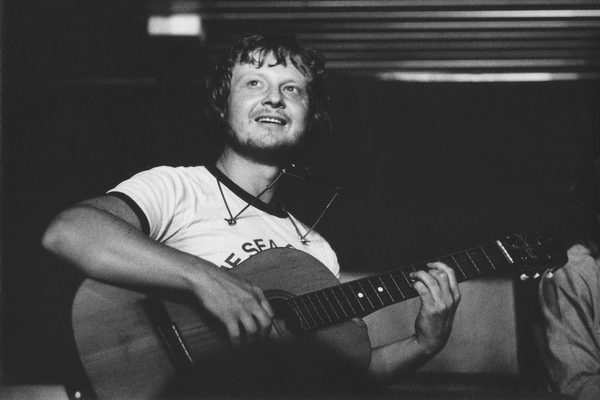
- Vladimír Merta in 1977 or 1978

Background information
- Born: 20 January 1946 (age 80); Prague, Czechoslovakia
- Genre: Folk music
- Instruments: Guitar, vocals, harmonica
- Years active: 1960s–present
- Website: http://www.vladimirmerta.cz/

Vladimír Merta (born 20 January 1946 in Prague, Czechoslovakia) is a Czech folk singer-songwriter. He was also a journalist, writer, photographer, architect, filmmaker and author of film music. He has recorded many solo albums. In 2011 he released the album Ponorná řeka with rock band Etc…. In the summer of 1976 and 1977 he performed at the Koncert mladosti festival in Pezinok, Slovakia.

== Discography ==
- Ballades de Prague (1969)
- Pravda o Marii (recorded 1970, unreleased)
- P.S. (1978)
- Vladimír Merta 1 (1989)
- Vladimír Merta 2 (1989)
- Struny ve větru (1989)
- Hodina vlka (1990)
- Chtít chytit vítr (1992)
- Bití rublem (1992)
- Svátky trpělivosti (1992)
- Sefardské inspirace (1996; with Jana Lewitová)
- Nebuď nikdy sám (1997)
- Obrázky v kartách (1998)
- Svátky trpělivosti (1999)
- Mít míň je víc (1999)
- Ametysty (2000)
- Bývaly časy (2001)
- Drobné lži (2003)
- Filmy v hlavě (2004)
- Jánošík (2007)
- Ve tmě mě zanechte... (2008; with Jana Lewitová; Czech versions of John Dowland's songs)
- LIVE / Malostranská beseda 1988 (2010)
- Ponorná řeka (2011; with Etc...)
- Včerejší vydání (2011; with Jan Hrubý)
