= Sammy Vomáčka =

- Born: Jiří Vomáčka; 17 August 1946 (age 79); Brandýs nad Labem, Czechoslovakia
- Genres: Blues, jazz
- Occupation: Musician
- Instrument: Guitar
- Website: Official website

Sammy Vomáčka (born Jiří Vomáčka; 17 August 1946 in Brandýs nad Labem) is a Czech guitarist. He started as a rock musician. Since the late 1960s he lived in Germany and later toured in Europe and the United States. He returned to Czechoslovakia after the Velvet Revolution and played there many concerts.

== Discography ==
- Ragtime Guitar (1974)
- Come to My Kitchen (1975)
- Rags & Tunes (1977)
- Live! (1980)
- Ragtime, Blues & Jazz Guitar (1998)
