= Jaroslav Erno Šedivý =

Czech musician (born 1947)

- Also known as: Erno Šedivý
- Born: Jaroslav Šedivý; 15 October 1947 (age 78); Prague, Czechoslovakia
- Genres: Rock, punk rock, psychedelic rock, heavy metal, jazz fusion
- Instrument: Drums
- Years active: 1960s-present

Jaroslav Erno Šedivý (born Jaroslav Šedivý on 15 October 1947, Prague, Czechoslovakia) is a Czech rock drummer. He was member of The Primitives Group, thereafter Flamengo (Kuře v hodinkách) and also Energit (briefly in 1973). In 1973 he emigrated to the United States, where he worked with a most groups including Jello Biafra's backing band and Invisible Pedestrian. Between 1974-1979 he lived in various towns in California and between 1979-1980 in New York. In 1990s he was member of Life After Life with another Czech emigrant Jim Čert. From 2009 he was member of 2zzex.
