= Framus Five =

Czech rock band

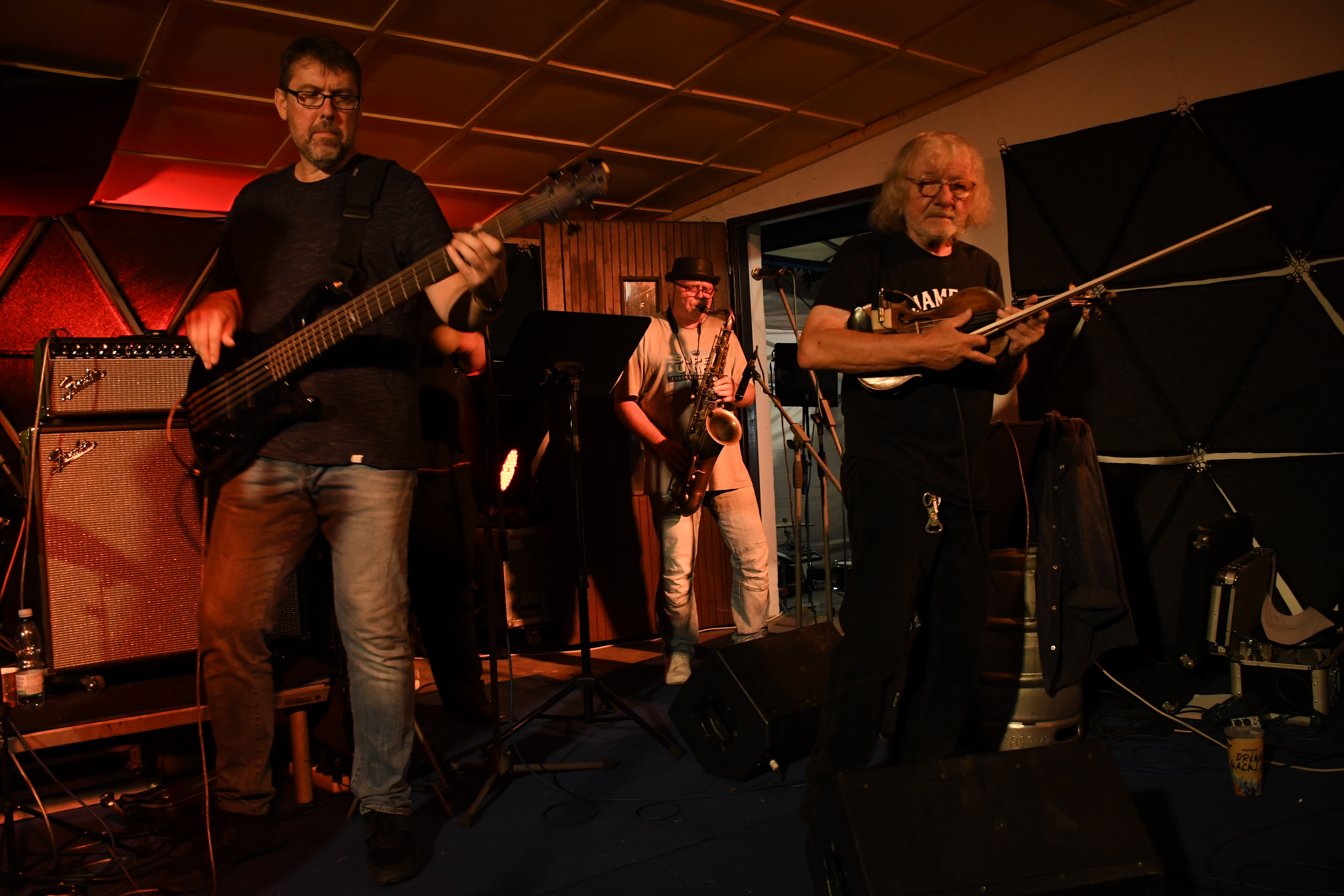
- Framus 5 performing in 2019

Background information
- Also known as: Framus 5
- Origin: Prague, Czechoslovakia
- Genres: Soul; R&B; rock
- Years active: 1963–1971, 1978–1990, 2000–present
- Labels: Supraphon
- Members: Michal Prokop; Luboš Andršt; Jan Hrubý; Jan Kolář; Zdeněk Tichota; Pavel Razím; Jiří Šíma; Roman Němec
- Past members: Ivan Trnka; Karel Káša Jahn; Ladislav Eliáš; Milan Vitoch; Rudolf Chundela; Martin Koubek; Tomáš Suchomel; Lubor Šonka; Miki Bláha; Michal Vrbovec; Jaroslav Petrásek; Aleš Charvát; Jiří Burda; Josef Šimon Kučera; Vítězslav Müller; Ivan Umáčený; Petr Klarfeld
- Website: michalprokop.cz

Framus Five is a Czech rock band founded in Prague in 1963 and led by singer and guitarist Michal Prokop. The band also includes guitarist Luboš Andršt and violinist Jan Hrubý. The group disbanded in 1971 but reunited in 1978 under the slightly altered name Framus 5. They again ceased activity in 1990, due to Prokop's involvement in politics. They regrouped once more in 2000 and continue to play to this day.

== History ==
Framus Five's debut album, Michal Prokop + Framus Five, released in 1968, was strongly influenced by American blues music. In 1970, the band was joined by guitarist Luboš Andršt and drummer Karel Káša Jahn. In 1971, they not only released a second album, titled Město ER, but also published an export edition of their debut, under the title Blues in Soul. With the advent of Normalization in Czechoslovakia after the 1968 Prague Spring, which effectively banned all English-language songs or names, Město ER was pulled from print, and the band disintegrated the year of its release. According to Prokop, the band name was derived from Framus, a popular German guitar brand.

Prokop subsequently sang in the band Šest strýců as well as with Eva Pilarová, among other projects. In 1978, he reformed his old band under the name Framus 5. The group's lineup changed frequently during this time, with the only stable members being Prokop and Trnka. In 1984, violinist Jan Hrubý joined the ensemble, and they collaborated with poet Pavel Šrut and composer Petr Skoumal on their fourth studio album, Kolej Yesterday.

In 1990, Prokop put Framus 5 on hiatus as he got involved in Czechoslovak politics. He renewed the group once more in 2000 as Michal Prokop & Friends, and in 2006, a reformed Framus 5 emerged, with a mix of new and old musicians.

== Band members ==
Current

- Michal Prokop – vocals, guitar
- Luboš Andršt – guitar
- Jan Hrubý – violin
- Jan Kolář – keyboards, oboe
- Zdeněk Tichota
- Pavel Razím
- Jiří Šíma
- Roman Němec

Former

- Ivan Trnka – keyboards
- Karel Káša Jahn – drums
- Ladislav Eliáš – bass
- Milan Vitoch – drums
- Rudolf Chundela – guitar
- Martin Koubek – guitar
- Tomáš Suchomel – drums
- Lubor Šonka – keyboards
- Miki Bláha – bass
- Michal Vrbovec – drums
- Jaroslav Petrásek
- Aleš Charvát – bass
- Jiří Burda – wind instruments
- Josef Šimon Kučera – wind instruments
- Vítězslav Müller – wind instruments
- Ivan Umáčený – wind instruments
- Petr Klarfeld – drums

== Discography ==
=== Studio albums ===
- Framus Five + Michal Prokop (1968) (export version was released in 1971 as Blues in Soul)
- Město ER (1972)
- Holubí dante (1980)
- Kolej Yesterday (1984)
- Nic ve zlým, nic v dobrým (1987)
- Snad nám naše děti… (1989)
- Sto roků na cestě (2012)
- Mohlo by to bejt nebe… (2021)

=== Compilations ===
- Až si pro mě přijdou (1990)
- Pořád to platí 1968 – 1989 (6-disc box set – 2008)
- Už je to napořád 2000 – 2012 (2016)

=== Live albums ===
- Live 60 (as Michal Prokop, Framus Five & Hosté – 2006)
