= Petr Novák (musician) =

Czech musician (1945–1997)

Background information
- Born: 6 September 1945; Prague, Czechoslovakia
- Died: 19 August 1997 (aged 51) Prague, Czech Republic
- Genres: Pop, rock and roll, psychedelic
- Occupations: singer-songwriter, musical artist, performer, writer
- Years active: 1963–1997

Petr Novák (6 September 1945 – 19 August 1997) was a Czech rock musician. He is best known for his romantic Beatles inspired pop songs with his bands George and Beatovens and Flamengo in the late 1960s.

== Biography ==
Born in Prague, at the age of six, he began playing the piano. He originally aspired to become an actor, but, hearing the Beatles and their lively Mersey sound music, he started a band with his friends. This band was briefly named The Beatles, but soon was renamed George and Beatovens. Their western style music was popular with the Czech youth and they quickly rose to popularity as one of the nations most popular bands. especially during the Prague Spring. Their success was short-lived. Soon the allies of the Warsaw Pact invaded and the Warsaw Pact occupation began. Afterwards, he began a solo career and his fame continued to grow, despite strict government regulations.

The new, more conservative administration, who frowned upon Petr's western influenced music and his notorious hard partying and heavy drinking, encouraged venuesm local and national gigs not to hire Petr to perform. His career reached its peak c. 1975 with the release of his last truly successful album "Kráska a zvíře", and afterwards it led to a slow decline along with his growing alcohol problems brought his days as a popular and influential musician to a halt. His music suffered after longtime collaborator and lyricist Ivo Plicka fled the country in the late seventies, therefore the quality of his music, his voice, and his songs deteriorated. Although he continued until his death, his musical output never reached the critical success of his earlier work. In fact, many of the albums released in the 1980s proved to be both critical and commercial failures. There was renewed interest in his music after the Velvet Revolution, but he was too ill to re-establish himself in popular culture.

He died in 1997, with his death certificate stating "suspect poisoning by unidentifiable poison X-49".

== Bands ==
- George and Beatovens
- Flamengo

== Discography ==
Albums

- Kolotoč svět – 1970, Panton
- Modlitba za lásku – 1970, Panton, prod. Jiří Smetana
- Ve jménu lásky – 1971, Panton
- Kráska a zvíře – 1975, Panton
- Co je to láska – 1980, Panton
- Sladké trápení – 12/1982, Panton
- Ahoj, tvůj Petr – 1983, Panton
- Greatest Hits – 1984, Panton/Artia
- Zpověď – 1985, Panton
- 12 nej – 1986, Panton, prod. Ladislav Klein
- Memento – 4/1989, Panton
- Petr Novák Live – 12/1992, Monitor, live
- Dávné sliby – 2/1996, Monitor
- Rub a líc – 10/1996
- Náhrobní kámen – 2/1996, Bonton
- Síň slávy – 7/1999, Sony Music Bonton

Singles

- Pokoj č. 26 / Lež bláznivého básníka (1968, Panton)
- Klaunova zpověď / Vracím se z flámu / Jsem tak líný / Špinavý ráj chudých (1968, Panton)
- Až ty a já (1968, Panton), & L. Ročáková
- 2. čs. beat-festival 68 (1969, Panton), (I Must Go From You / Be My Daughter)
- Toreador se nesmí bát / Řekni proč pláčeš (1969, Panton)
- Stůj / Dívky z perel (1969, Panton)
- Den štěstí / Když padají skály (1969, Panton)
- Zlá chvíle / Uteč dřív, než přijdu k vám (1969, Panton)
- Bezhlavý rytíř / Jdi dál (1969, Panton)
- Be My Daughter / You Leave Me (1969, Sonet)
- Já / Dětský oči (1970, Panton)
- Esther / Kde ticho umírá (1970, Panton)
- Ostrov dětských snů / V říši pohádek (1970, Panton)
- Mořský racek / Vyrušen ze spaní (1970, Panton)
- Noční bouře / Happy end (1970, Panton)
- Jarní den / Zahrada za domem (1971, Panton)
- Jak čerstvý sníh / Já se vrátím (1971, Panton)
- Krásná dívka / Nejstarší automobil (1971, Panton), & Jazzinky
- A já tě vítám / Ze všech nejkrásnější (1972, Panton)
- Dívenka z duhy / Náš dům / Madlén / Kytara (1973, Panton)
- Každý rok je máj (1975, Panton)
- A ty víš, že se vrátí / V klubu Vesmír všichni tančí (1976, Panton), & Věra Mazánková
- Co je to láska / Všichni jdou za láskou (1977, Panton)
- Říkáš mi sbohem / Láskou máš žít / Když máš z lásky závrať / Když tě láska opustí (1979, Panton)
- Proč muže lákají skály / Děvče z krásných začátků (11/79, Panton)
- Klaunova zpověď / Dětské oči (4/80, Panton)
- Povídej / Bláznova ukolébavka / Stovky hotelů / S OPBH Na LVT (7/80), & Pavel Dydovič a Orchestrion & Katapult & Ladislav Smoljak
- Stárnoucí snílek / Holka s bílou halenou (12/80, Panton), & Věra Wajsarová
- Sladké trápení / Život můj šel dál (12/81, Panton)
- Mládě / Když se stmívá (12/82, Panton)
- Dej mi čas / Málo jsem tě znal (6/83, Panton)
- Ahoj, čtrnáctiletá / Taxikář (1983, Panton)
- Chci tě mít / Svítíš (1985, Panton)
- Jak mi sbohem dát / Svět a nesvět (1987, Panton)
