= Vladimír Mišík =

Czech musician and politician (born 1947)

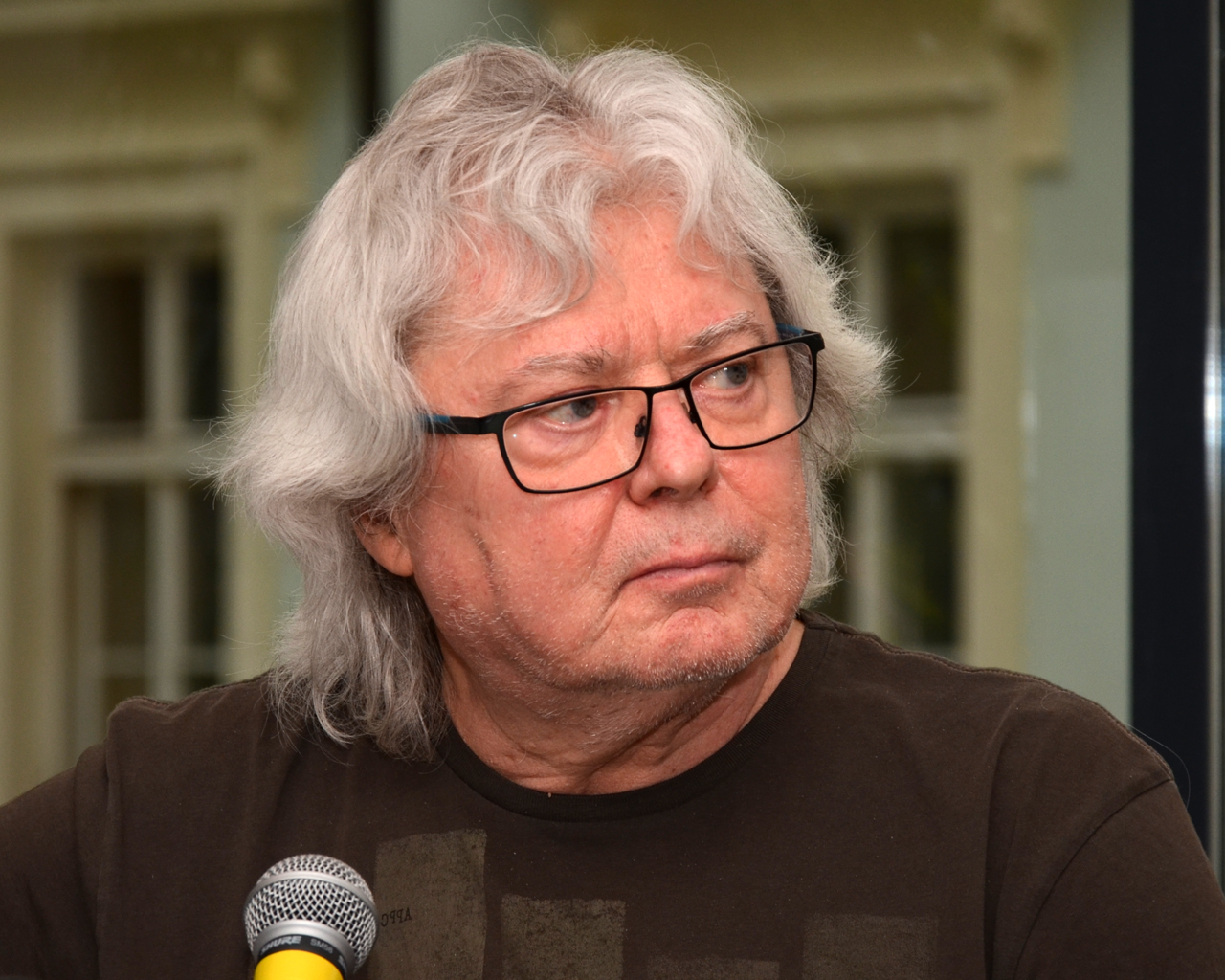
- Mišík in 2015

Background information
- Born: 8 March 1947 (age 79); Prague, Czechoslovakia
- Genres: Blues rock; folk rock; rock
- Occupations: Musician, politician
- Instruments: Guitar, vocals
- Years active: 1960s–present
- Formerly of: The Matadors; Flamengo; Energit; Blue Effect; Etc...; Čundrgrund
- Website: vladimirmisik.cz

Vladimír Mišík (born 8 March 1947) is a Czech musician and politician. He is the founder or co-founder of the bands Matadors, Blue Effect, and Etc....

== Career ==
=== Music ===
Mišík founded his first band, Uragán, as a teenager. Later, he became the lead singer of Komety, where he met Radim Hladík, with whom he also played in Fontána (later known as The Matadors). He also sang in Karel Duba's band. In 1968, Mišík and Hladík co-founded the band Blue Effect.

In 1970, Mišík left Blue Effect and became a member of Flamengo, with whom he recorded Kuře v hodinkách, the only studio album the band released. The record, published in 1972, was banned by the Communist regime under Normalization and the group broke up the same year. During this period, Mišík also briefly sang with Energit.

In 1974, he founded his own band, called Etc..., with which he is active to this day. He also occasionally performed with Vladimír Merta and Jan Hrubý in the folk rock band Čundrgrund.

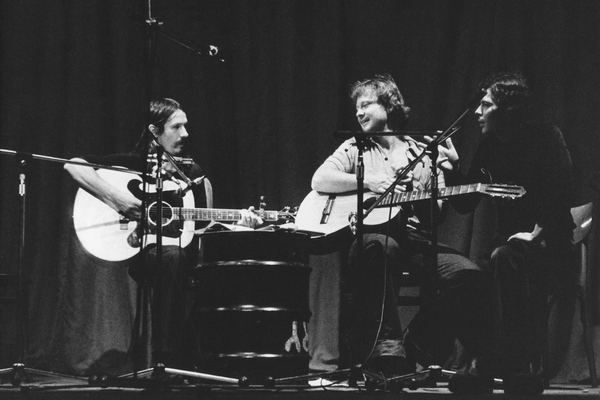
Čundrgrund in 1977. From left: Petr Kalandra, Vladimír Merta, Vladimír Mišík

In 1982, Mišík was banned from performing by the Communist government, though he was permitted to resume musical activities by 1985.

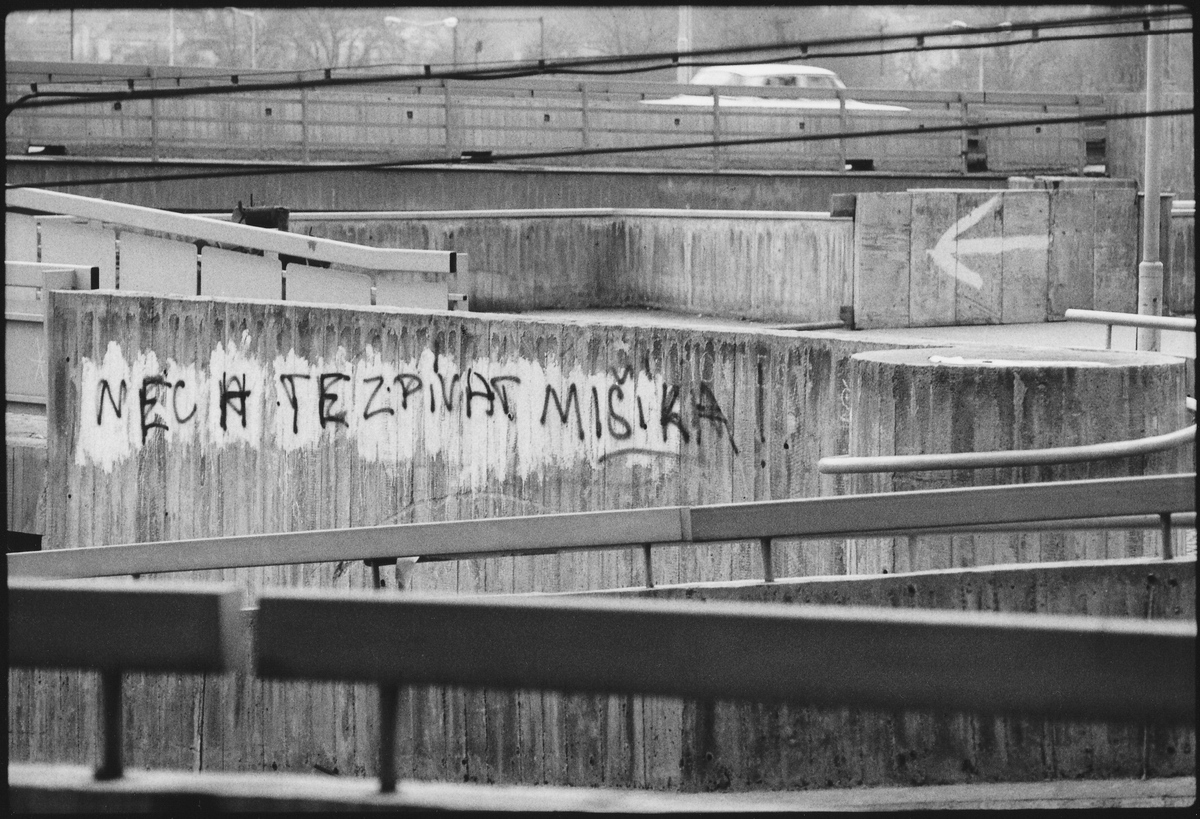
Let Mišík sing! – graffiti on a wall in Holešovice, Prague, April 1983, from the period when Mišík's concerts were banned by Communist authorities. The graffiti was repeatedly painted over, but it always reappeared.

In 2004, Mišík was inducted into the Beatová síň slávy (Beat Hall of Fame).

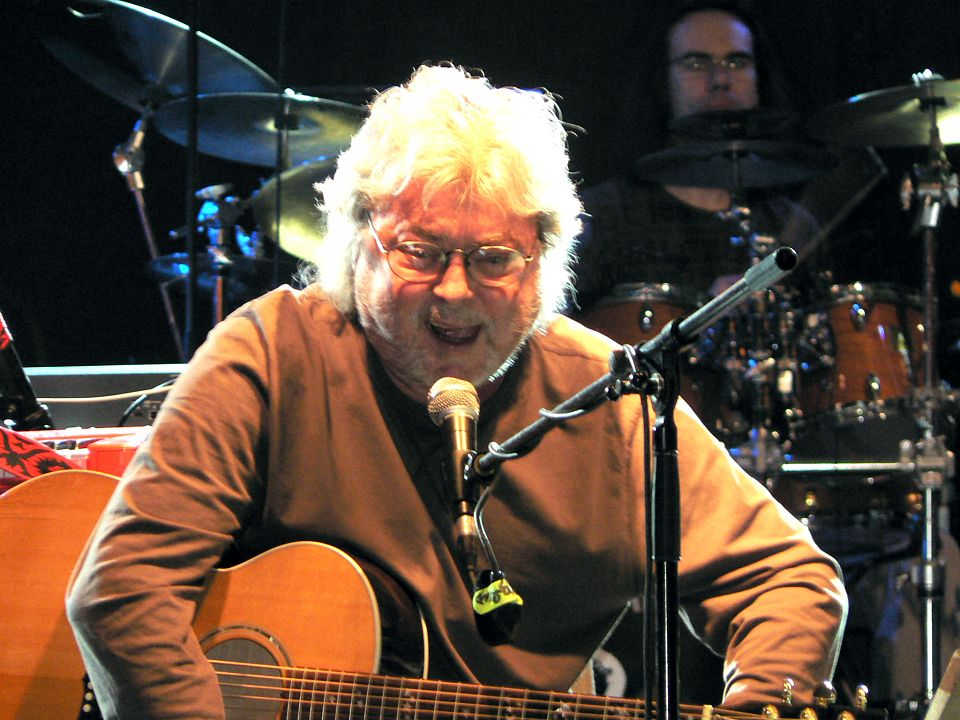
Mišík performing in 2005

In 2007, after dealing with serious health problems, Mišík returned to performing with Etc...

In 2012, on the fortieth anniversary of Flamengo's Kuře v hodinkách, Mišík joined the briefly reunited group onstage at Prague's Palác Akropolis for a concert that included two of his Etc... bandmates, as well as other guest musicians.

In 2016, director Jitka Němcová filmed the feature documentary Nechte zpívat Mišíka about the artist.

His 2019 album, Jednou Tě Potkám, was nominated for IMPALA's European Independent Album of the Year Award. A year later, it won six Anděl Awards, in the categories Album of the Year, Artist of the Year, Song of the Year, Video of the Year, Best Folk Album, and Best Rock Album.

In April 2021, the musician announced that he would cease to perform, for health reasons.

=== Politics ===
In 1990, Mišík was elected to the Czech National Council for two years, as a member of the Civic Forum party.

In October 2013, he refused to accept a state award from President Miloš Zeman, as an expression of dissatisfaction with some recent decisions made by the Czech leader.

== Personal life ==
Mišík's father, John Gaugan, was an American soldier, and his mother was a Slovak nurse who worked for the Red Cross in Germany at the end of World War II. In 2017, he learned that he has another nine siblings in the United States.

Mišík has three children. Two of them, Martin and Adam, are also musicians.

In 1995, astronomers at the Kleť Observatory named an asteroid in the Solar System after the artist. The International Astronomical Union approved the name "Mišík" for asteroid No. 18456 in 2014.

== Discography ==
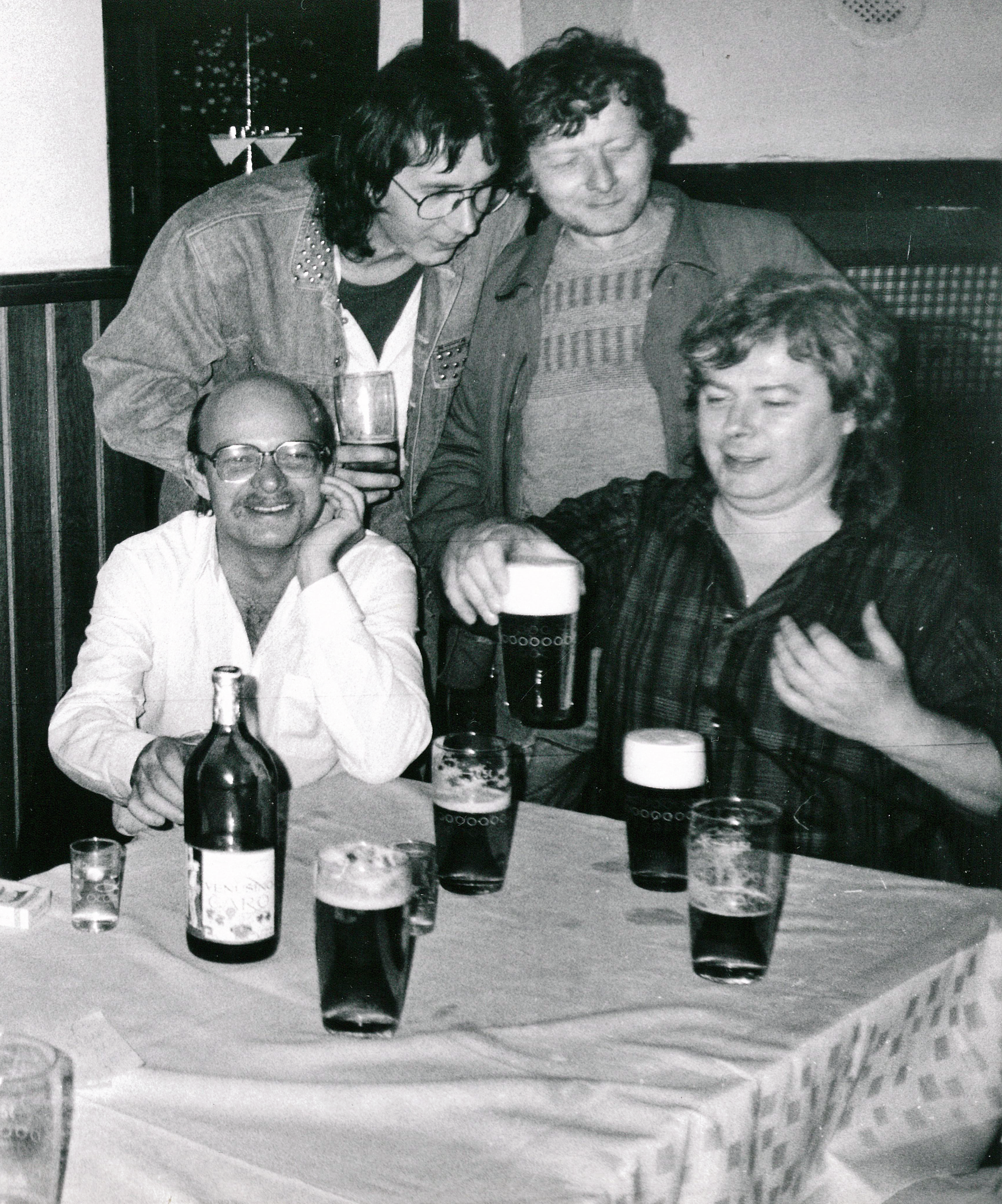
Poet Jaromír Pelc and Etc... – Vladimír Mišík, Jaroslav Olin Nejezchleba, Jan Hrubý (1985)

=== with Blue Effect ===
- Meditace (1970)
- Kingdom of Life (1971 – English version of Meditace)

=== with Flamengo ===
- Kuře v hodinkách (1972)
- Paní v černém – singly 1967–72 (2003)

=== with Etc... ===
- Etc… (1976 – also known as Stříhali dohola malého chlapečka)
- They Cut Off the Little Boy's Hair (1978 – English version of Etc…)
- Etc… 2 (1980)
- Etc… 3 (1987)
- Etc… 4 (1987)
- Jiří Jelínek in memoriam (1987)
- 20 deka duše (1990)
- Nechte zpívat Mišíka (1991)
- Jen se směj (1993)
- Unplugged (1994)
- Město z peřin (1996)
- Nůž na hrdle (1999)
- Umlkly stroje (2004)
- Archa + hosté (2008)
- Déja vu (1976–1987) Box I. (2009)
- Ztracený podzim (2010)
- Déja vu (1989–1996) Box II. (2010)

=== with Blue Shadows ===
- Jednou tě potkám (2019)
- Noční obraz (2021)

=== Compilations ===
- Síň slávy (2000)
- Královský večer (2014)
- Životní režim (2018)

=== Other recordings ===
- Požár na obloze (1988 – reinterpretation of Jaromír Pelc's poetry)
- Pár tónů, které přebývají (1989 – reinterpretation of Václav Hrabě's poetry)
- Vladimír Mišík & Mirek Kovářík – Reduta Blues (2013)

=== Tributes ===
- Bazarem proměn: A Tribute to Vladimír Mišík (2015)
