= Abraxas (band) =

Czech rock band

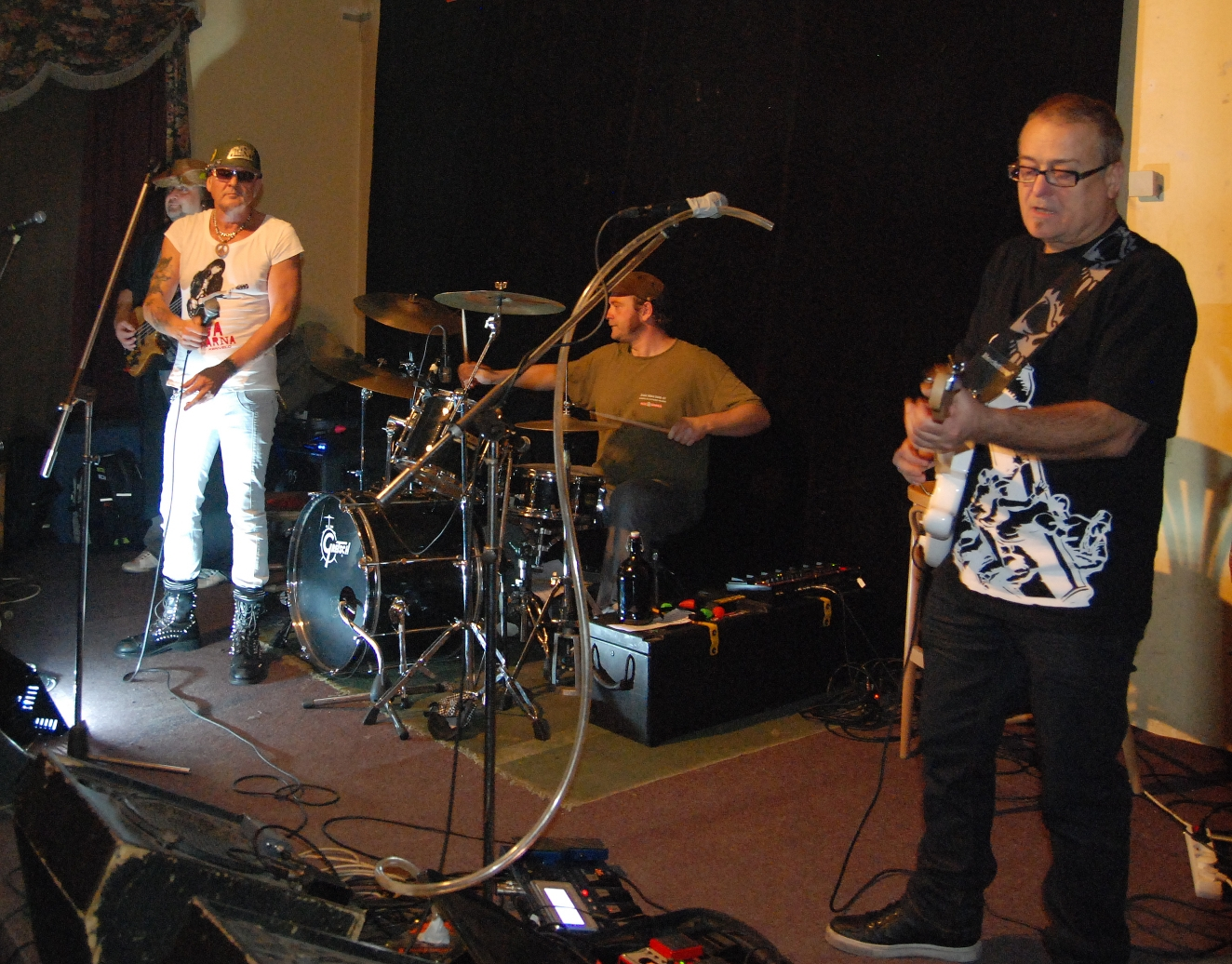
- Abraxas performing in 2011

Background information
- Origin: Prague, Czechoslovakia
- Genres: Rock
- Years active: 1976—present
- Label: Supraphon
- Members: Slávek Janda; Petr Hradecký; Eduard Štěpánek; Ivan Doležálek
- Past members: Ivan Sekyra; Lubomír Nohavica; Jiří Cendra; Antonín Smrčka; Ivan Pelíšek; Michal Ditrich; Miroslav Imrich; Vladimír Padrůněk; Jaroslav Trachta; Ladislav Sosna; Vítek Švec; Imran Musa Zangi; Pepa Vondrášek; Josef Havlíček; Martin Kadnár; David Růžička; Petr Soukup
- Website: abraxas.cz

Abraxas is a Czech rock band formed in 1976 after the breakup of the group Abraam. The band is led by guitarist and composer Slávek Janda, who is the only member to have remained with Abraxas from its formation until the present day.

== History ==
=== Early years: 1976—1988 ===
The original lineup of Abraxas consisted of Slávek Janda on guitar and vocals, Miroslav Imrich (vocals), Ivan Sekyra (guitar), Jiří Cendra (keyboards), Antonín Smrčka (bass guitar), and Ivan Pelíšek (drums). The band's early inspiration came from the likes of Pink Floyd, and their sound and stage shows leaned towards Czech new wave by the early 1980s.

In 1981, bass player Vladimír Padrůněk briefly joined the band. He was replaced by Michal Ditrich. The same year, the band released their first studio album, titled Box. Shortly thereafter, keyboardist Lubomír Nohavica joined the group. In 1983, Miroslav Imrich and Ivan Pelíšek left. Abraxas continued with Janda, Ditrich, Nohavica, and new members Jaroslav Trachta (saxophone) and Ladislav Sosna (drums). In 1984, the album Manéž was released, introducing the first hints of funk in the band's music. Abraxas toured a lot around this time, with two albums following in close succession: Midnight City in 1985 and Šťastnej blázen in 1986. The band's style and lineup continued to evolve as well. They adopted a more acoustic sound, and included new members and instruments. Vítek Švec joined on double bass, Imran Musa Zangi contributed percussion, and vocalist and lyricist Pepa Vondrášek also joined the group. The year 1987 saw the release of the EP Proužek dýmu. In 1988, the band was briefly reduced to a trio consisting of Janda, Smrčka, and Josef Havlíček on drums, before going on an extended hiatus.

Slávek Janda embarked on several side projects, working with Jana Koubková in the group Panta Rhei and forming Yandim Band.

=== Reunion: 1994—present ===
On 4 December 1994, various members of Abraxas met at a concert in Prague's Rock Café, which was held on the occasion of the release of their compilation album The Best of Abraxas (1979–1982). During the concert, the musicians introduced their current bands (Yandim Band, Imrich Tekkknofactory, Hypnotix). The band then decided to reform, with their formation consisting of previous members Janda, Imrich, Pelíšek, and the addition of bassist Martin Kadnár and drummer David Růžička. In 1996, they released the album Sado-Maso, bearing a distinctly hard rock sound. All the more surprising was the release of the next album, Rituál, in 2000, this one with a return to their earlier funk style. The album spawned the hit singles "Karel drogy nebere" (featuring Karel Gott) and "Obyčejnej svět". Following this, the band went on to tour regularly. In 2003, they released a double-album retrospective, appropriately titled Retrospektiva.

In 2006, Abraxas played a concert at Lucerna Music Bar, commemorating thirty years as a band. The following year, the album Už je to jedno was released. In 2008, Slávek Janda celebrated forty years on the Czech music scene with a concert which included members of Abraxas, Slávek Janda Band, and Yandim Band. A DVD of the concert was also released. In 2009, Abraxas released the album Hlava v oblacích and toured with Michal Pavlíček.

In 2011, Abraxas went through another personnel change. Ivan Doležálek, who also played with Janda in SJB and Yandim Band, joined on bass, and Růžička was replaced by Eduard Štěpánek on drums. That year, the band celebrated 35 years of existence and on 19 October 2011, the celebrations culminated in a concert at Prague's Retro Music Hall in the presence of all the band's previous drummers as well as other guests, including Imran Musa Zangi, Matěj Ruppert, Viktor Dyk, and Varhan Orchestrovič Bauer. The concert was recorded and released on DVD. Around this time, Petr Soukup, manager, lyricist, and producer, joined the band. Soukup brought Abraxas back to Supraphon and produced the double album Tribute, which consisted of 28 Abraxas hits recorded by Czech pop, rock, and alternative musicians.

Founding member Ivan Sekyra died in June 2012, at the age of 59.

In 2015, the band's latest album, Klid!, was released.

In 2016, Abraxas issued the compilation Nekonečný boogie, which is a 2-CD release spanning their entire repertoire of nine studio albums.

Former vocalist Miroslav Imrich died on 4 May 2024, aged 71.

== Band members ==
Current

- Slávek Janda – guitar, vocals
- Petr Hradecký – lyrics, management, production
- Eduard Štěpánek – drums
- Ivan Doležálek – bass, vocals

Past

- Ivan Sekyra – guitar, vocals (died in 2012)
- Miroslav Imrich – vocals (died in 2024)
- Jiří Cendra – keyboards
- Antonín Smrčka – bass
- Ivan Pelíšek – drums
- Vladimír Padrůněk – bass
- Michal Ditrich – bass
- Lubomír Nohavica – keyboards
- Jaroslav Trachta – saxophone
- Ladislav Sosna – drums
- Vítek Švec – double bass
- Imran Musa Zangi – percussion
- Pepa Vondrášek – vocals
- Josef Havlíček – drums
- Martin Kadnár – bass
- David Růžička – drums
- Petr Soukup – lyrics, management, production

== Discography ==
=== Studio albums ===
- Box (1982)
- Manéž (1984)
- Midnight City (1985)
- Šťastnej blázen (1986)
- Sado-Maso (1996)
- Box & 10x bonus (2000 - CD reissue of Box)
- Rituál (2000)
- Už je to jedno (2007)
- Hlava v oblacích (2009)
- Klid! (2015)

=== EPs ===
- Tak pojď / Školník (1977)
- Cesta jinam 1 / Cesta jinam 2 (1977)
- Muž stroj / Praha-Bohumín (1981)
- Nesmíš si to tak brát / Zbytečný slova (1983)
- Karel / Měsíc (1984)
- Dneska mám pech / Honza rock'n'roll star (1984)
- Proužek dýmu (1987)

=== Compilations ===
- The Best of Abraxas (1979–1982) (1994)
- Retrospektiva (2003)
- Nahrávky z let 1977–1981 (2012)
- Nahrávky z let 1982–1989 (2012)
- Nekonečný boogie (2016)

=== Live albums ===
- 30 let (2006)
- 35 let (2013)

=== Singles ===
- "Už tady jsou" (2015)
- "Klid!" (2015)

== DVDs ==
- Slávek Janda 40 let na scéně (2008, group concert including Slávek Janda Band, Yandim Band, and Abraxas)
- 35 let (2013)

== Tributes ==
- Tribute (2014, various artists)
