= Jazz Q =

Czech jazz fusion band

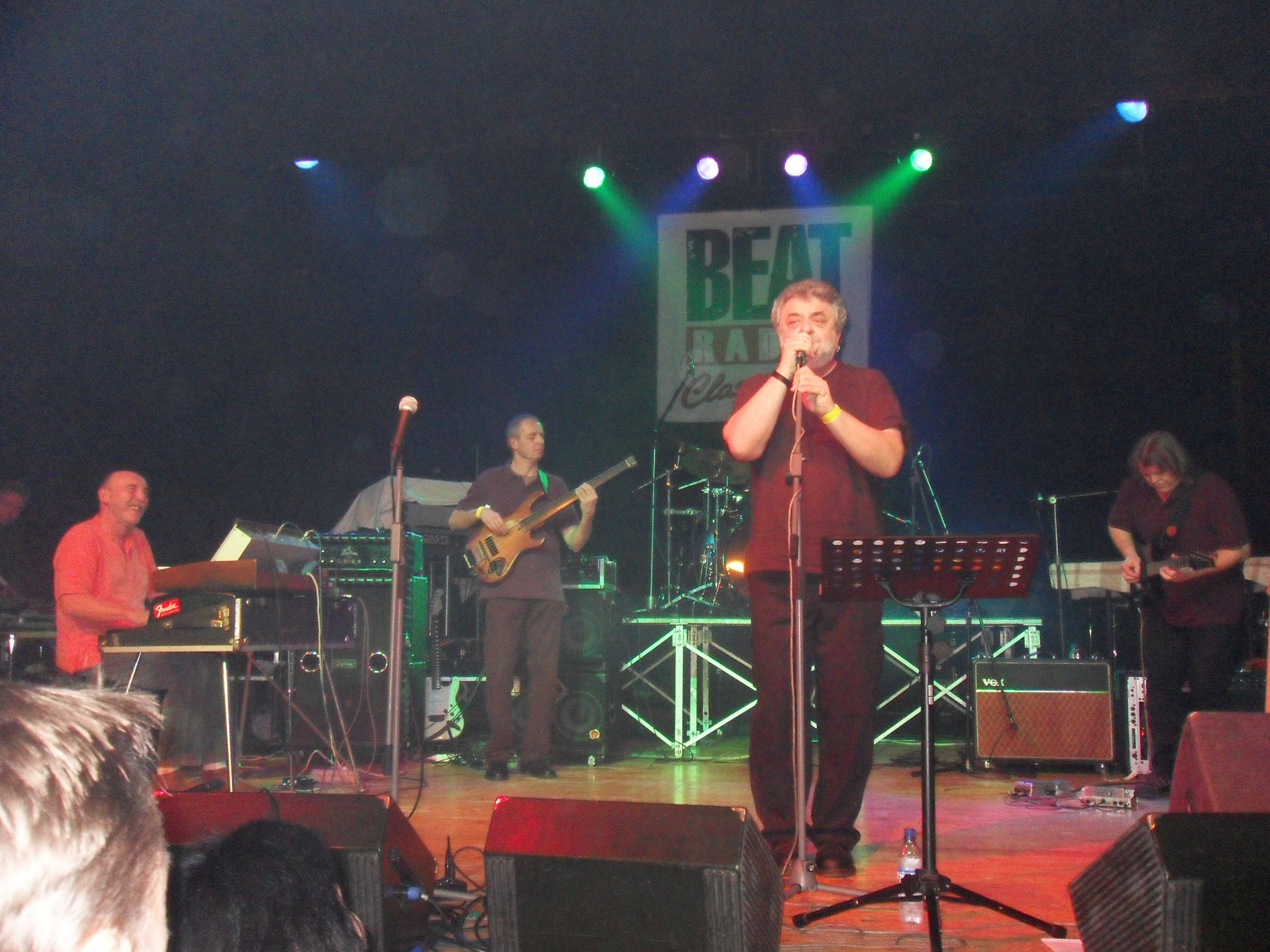
- Jazz Q performing in 2011

Background information
- Origin: Prague, Czechoslovakia
- Genres: Jazz fusion; art rock
- Years active: 1964–1986, 2001, 2003–present
- Labels: Supraphon; Panton; Bonton
- Members: Martin Kratochvíl
- Past members: Jiří Stivín; Luboš Andršt; František Francl; Vladimír Padrůněk; Michal Vrbovec; Joan Duggan; Mirka Křivánková; Jana Kratochvílová; Alexandr Čihař; Přemysl Faukner; Libor Laun; Pavel Trnavský; Vladimír Tomek; Oskar Petr; Zdeněk Fišer; Jaromír Helešic

Jazz Q is a Czech jazz fusion band from Prague. It was established in 1964 in the former Czechoslovakia by musicians Martin Kratochvíl (keyboards) and Jiří Stivín (flute) but didn't gain recognition until the next decade. In 1970, Jazz Q released the jazz-rock album Coniunctio, together with Radim Hladík's Blue Effect. Stivín left the band the same year. Following this, the group took their music in the direction of electric jazz and art rock, with a new lineup that included Luboš Andršt on guitar, Vladimír Padrůněk on bass, and Michal Vrbovec on drums. In 1973, Jazz Q was joined by English blues singer Joan Duggan.

== Band members ==
Current

- Martin Kratochvíl – keyboards

Past

- Jiří Stivín – flute
- Luboš Andršt – guitar
- František Francl – guitar
- Vladimír Padrůněk – bass
- Michal Vrbovec – drums
- Joan Duggan – vocals
- Mirka Křivánková – vocals
- Jana Kratochvílová – vocals
- Alexandr Čihař – bass
- Přemysl Faukner – bass
- Libor Laun – drums
- Pavel Trnavský – drums
- Vladimír Tomek – percussion
- Oskar Petr – vocals
- Zdeněk Fišer – guitar
- Jaromír Helešic – drums

== Discography ==
- Coniunctio (1970)
- Pozorovatelna (1973)
- Symbiosis (1974)
- Elegie (1976)
- Zvěsti (1978)
- Hodokvas (1979)
- Hvězdoň (1984)
- 1974-75 live (1991)
- The Best of Jazz Q (1995)
- Martin Kratochvíl & Jazz Q (2007 – 8-CD box set)
- Znovu (2013)
- Živí Se Diví: Live in Bratislava 1975 (2013)
- Talisman (2016)
- Amulet (2020)
