= Jim Čert =

Czech musician (1956–2026)

- Born: František Horáček; 25 February 1956; Prague, Czechoslovakia
- Died: 17 February 2026 (aged 69) Czech Republic
- Occupations: Singer, accordionist
- Instruments: Accordion

František Horáček (25 February 1956 – 17 February 2026), better known as Jim Čert, was a Czech singer and accordionist.

== Life and career ==
Čert was born František Horáček in Prague on 25 February 1956. He was known for writing ballads based on East Slavic folklore. In addition, he played popular pub rhymes (Ručičky, don't be afraid), and parody songs (The Master of Transports).

Čert died on 17 February 2026, at the age of 69.

== Controversy ==
Čert was often criticised for his cooperation with the communist State Security, which he denied as recently as 1996. He signed the cooperation on 21 June 1979 in Hradec Králové, his file as a StB agent was kept under the code name "Akord". From 23 October 1981, he worked in Prague as "Homer". Under the pretext of chronic liver inflammation, the cooperation was terminated on 14 March 1989. During the entire time, he was paid an amount of approximately 7,200 CSK, vouchers to department stores and about a thousand crowns for expenses, i.e. a total of about 8,200 CSK. In 1991, he left for the USA for a period. In 2007, he apologized for his cooperation with the State Security in a letter sent to the Czech media.
