= 37th Karlovy Vary International Film Festival =

2002 film festival in the Czech Republic

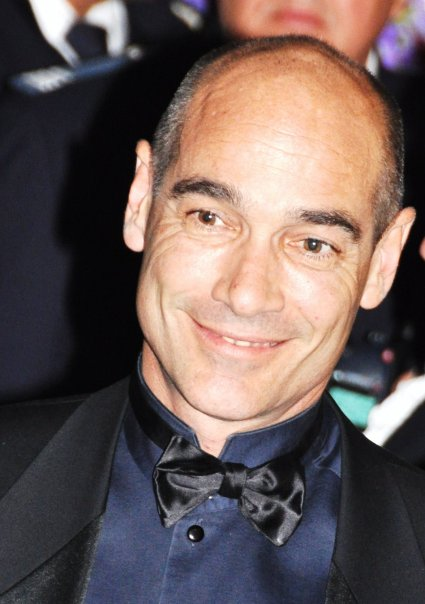
Jean-Marc Barr, Jury President

The 37th Karlovy Vary International Film Festival took place from 4 to 13 July 2002. The Crystal Globe was won by Year of the Devil, a Czech mockumentary film directed by Petr Zelenka. The second prize, the Special Jury Prize was won by Nowhere in Africa, a German historical film directed by Caroline Link. French American film actor and director Jean-Marc Barr was the president of the jury.

== Juries ==
The following people formed the juries of the festival:

Main competition

- Jean-Marc Barr, Jury President (France)
- Bibiana Beglau (Germany)
- Roger Ebert (USA)
- Ibolya Fekete (Hungary)
- Jan Malíř (Czech Republic)
- Kaynam Myung (South Korea)
- Asumpta Serna (Spain)

Documentaries

- Andrej Plachov, president (Russia)
- Andrej Kalpakči (Ukraine)
- Pavel Koutecký (Czech Republic)
- Nosha van der Lely (Netherlands)
- David Franca Mendes (Brazil)

== Official selection awards ==
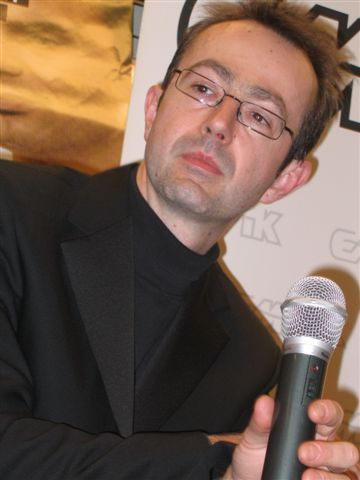
Petr Zelenka, director of Year of the Devil

The following feature films and people received the official selection awards:

- Crystal Globe (Grand Prix) - Year of the Devil (Rok ďábla) by Petr Zelenka (Czech Republic)
- Special Jury Prize - Nowhere in Africa (Nirgendwo in Afrika) by Caroline Link (Germany)
- Best Director Award - Asghar Massombagi for Khaled (Canada)
- Best Actress Award - Ugla Egilsdóttir for her role in The Seagull's Laughter (Mávahlátur) (Iceland)
- Best Actor Award - William H. Macy for his role in Focus (USA)
- Special Jury Mention - Let's Not Cry (Gwenchana uljima) by Boung-hun Min (South Korea) & Smoking Room by Roger Gual, Julio D. Wallovits (Spain)

== Other statutory awards ==
Other statutory awards that were conferred at the festival:

- Best documentary film (over 30 min.) - Enan no musume (en. Daughter from Yan'an) by Kaoru Ikeya (Japan)
  - Special Jury Mention - Devil's Playground by Lucy Walker (USA) & Andrey Belyy. Okhota na angela, ili Chetyre lyubvi poeta i proritsatelya (en. Hunting Down an Angel, or Four Passions of the Soothsayer Poet) by Andrey Osipov (Russia)
- Best documentary film (under 30 min.) - Obec B. (en. Village B.) by Filip Remunda (Czech Republic)
- Crystal Globe for Outstanding Artistic Contribution to World Cinema - John Boorman (UK), Vlastimil Brodský (Czech Republic), Sean Connery (UK)
- Award of the Town of Karlovy Vary - Michael York (UK)
- Audience Award - L'Auberge Espagnole by Cédric Klapisch (France, Spain)

== Non-statutory awards ==
The following non-statutory awards were conferred at the festival:

- FIPRESCI International Critics Award: Nowhere in Africa (Nirgendwo in Afrika) by Caroline Link (Germany)
  - Special Mention: Let's Not Cry (Gwenchana uljima) by Boung-hun Min (South Korea)
- FICC - The Don Quixote Prize: Bedtime Fairy Tales for Crocodiles (Cuentos de hadas para dormir cocodrilos) by Ignacio Ortíz Cruz (Mexico)
- Ecumenical Jury Award: Cisza (en. Silence) by Michal Rosa (Poland)
  - Special Mention: Filament (Firamento) by Hitonari Tsuji (Japan)
- Philip Morris Film Award: Sisters (Syostry) by Sergei Bodrov, Jr. (Russia)
- NETPAC Award: The Coast Guard (Haeanseon) Kim Ki-duk (South Korea)
