= Nowhere in Africa =

2001 German film by Caroline Link

- Theatrical release poster
- Directed by: Caroline Link
- Screenplay by: Caroline Link
- Based on: Nirgendwo in Afrika by Stefanie Zweig
- Produced by: Peter Herrmann
- Starring: Juliane Köhler; Merab Ninidze
- Cinematography: Gernot Roll
- Edited by: Patricia Rommel
- Music by: Niki Reiser
- Distributed by: Constantin Film
- Release date: 27 December 2001
- Running time: 141 minutes
- Country: Germany
- Languages: German; English; Swahili
- Budget: €7 million
- Box office: $24,352,725

Nowhere in Africa (German: Nirgendwo in Afrika) is a 2001 German drama film that was written and directed by Caroline Link. The screenplay is based on the 1995 autobiographical novel of the same name by Stefanie Zweig. It tells the story of the life in Kenya of a German-Jewish family that emigrated there in 1938 to escape persecution in Nazi Germany. The film won the Academy Award for Best Foreign Language Film as well as the 2001 German Film Award (Deutscher Filmpreis) in five categories, including Best Fiction Film.

== Plot ==
In 1938, the Redlich family flees to Kenya from Leobschütz in Silesia, Nazi Germany, to escape the increasing persecution of the Jews. Walter, a former lawyer, finds work as a farm manager and sends for his family. His wife Jettel has trouble adjusting to life in Africa, although their daughter Regina quickly adapts to her new environment, easily learning the language of the country and showing interest in local culture. Regina soon forms a close friendship with the farm's cook, Owuor, who helped save Walter's life when he contracted malaria. The only German contact that Jettel has is through a friend of Walter's named Süsskind, an ex-German who has lived in Africa for years. Jettel asks Süsskind why he was never married, and he states that he had a habit of falling in love with married women.

When war breaks out, the British authorities round up all German citizens and intern them, including Jews, separating men from women. The Redlichs' marriage begins to deteriorate and Walter accuses Jettel of not wanting to have sex with him since he is only a farmer. Jettel sleeps with a German-speaking British soldier to secure work and a home on a farm for the family, and Regina and Walter both find out.

Walter decides to join the British Army and wants Jettel to go to Nairobi with him, but she refuses and stays to run the farm with Owuor. Regina is sent to an English boarding school, and is kept there for years, only being able to come back every so often during the harvest season. Jettel becomes fluent in Swahili and runs the farm competently, gaining an appreciation for African culture and hard work that she did not have before. During this time, Jettel and Süsskind develop a relationship; she kisses him, but he seems to decline to have a relationship (whether they had sex or not remains unclear).

Walter comes back from the war for which Jettel is overjoyed and reconciles with him. Later, he tells her that his father was beaten to death and his sister died in a concentration camp. He applies for a law position in Germany and receives word that he can immediately be placed as a judge. He states that the British Army's policy is to send all soldiers and their families back home. Jettel refuses to go with him, saying the farm needs her and that she is tired of following him around. She also refuses to believe that a country that killed their relatives could ever really be considered home. An angry Walter replies that she hated Africa at first and couldn't wait to get back to Germany, and that she is being selfish. Walter asks Regina if she wants to go with him, but Regina does not want to leave Owuor.

As Walter is preparing to leave alone, a swarm of locusts appears and threatens the harvest. Jettel sees Walter returning to fight off the locusts, and is touched at his dedication to the family. Eventually the locusts leave without serious damage to the crops and the farmers celebrate. Jettel and Walter have sex and reconcile, and she tells him that she is pregnant with his child, leading him to conclude that she didn't have sex with Süsskind. Owuor decides to go on a journey, realising that the Redlichs' life is back in Germany, and he and Regina tearfully say goodbye. Jettel allows Walter to decide whether or not they should leave, and he acquires tickets back to Germany.

The final scene shows Walter, Regina, and Jettel travelling on a train on the way to leave Africa. As it stops, an African woman offers Jettel a banana. In a narration, Regina states that her brother was born healthy and was named Max, after her paternal grandfather.

== Cast ==
- Juliane Köhler as Jettel Redlich
- Merab Ninidze as Walter Redlich
- Sidede Onyulo as Owuor
- Matthias Habich as Süsskind
- Lea Kurka as Regina (younger)
- Karoline Eckertz as Regina (older)
- Gerd Heinz as Max
- Andrew Sachs as Mr. Rubens
- Diane Keen as Mrs. Rubens
- Anthony Bate as Mr. Brindley
- David Michaels as Robert Green

== Reception ==
The film was very well received by many international critics. Michael Wilmington of the Chicago Tribune called Nowhere in Africa "stunning". Kenneth Turan of the Los Angeles Times hailed the film as being "laced with poignancy and conflict, urgency and compassion." David Edelstein was less enthusiastic, writing "The movie isn't boring, but it's shapeless, more like a memoir than a novel, and threads are left dangling—as if it was meant to be four hours instead of 140 minutes."

On review aggregator website Rotten Tomatoes, the film holds an approval rating of 85% based on 101 reviews. The website's critical consensus states that the film is "a visually lovely epic with compelling, three-dimensional characters." On Metacritic, the film has a weighted average score of 72 out of 100, based on 31 critics, indicating "generally favorable reviews".

== Accolades ==
- Deutscher Filmpreis ("German Film Award": "Golden Lola") 2002
  - Best Film
  - Best Cinematography: Gernot Roll
  - Best Director: Caroline Link
  - Best Music: Niki Reiser
  - Best Supporting Actor: Matthias Habich
- Bayerischer Filmpreis ("Bavarian Film Award") 2002: Best Production (Producer's Award)
- Bayerischer Filmpreis ("Bavarian Film Award") 2003: Public Award
- 37th Karlovy Vary International Film Festival: Special Jury Prize
- 75th Academy Awards: Best Foreign Language Film
