= Oldřich Hamera =

Czech artist (1944–2021)

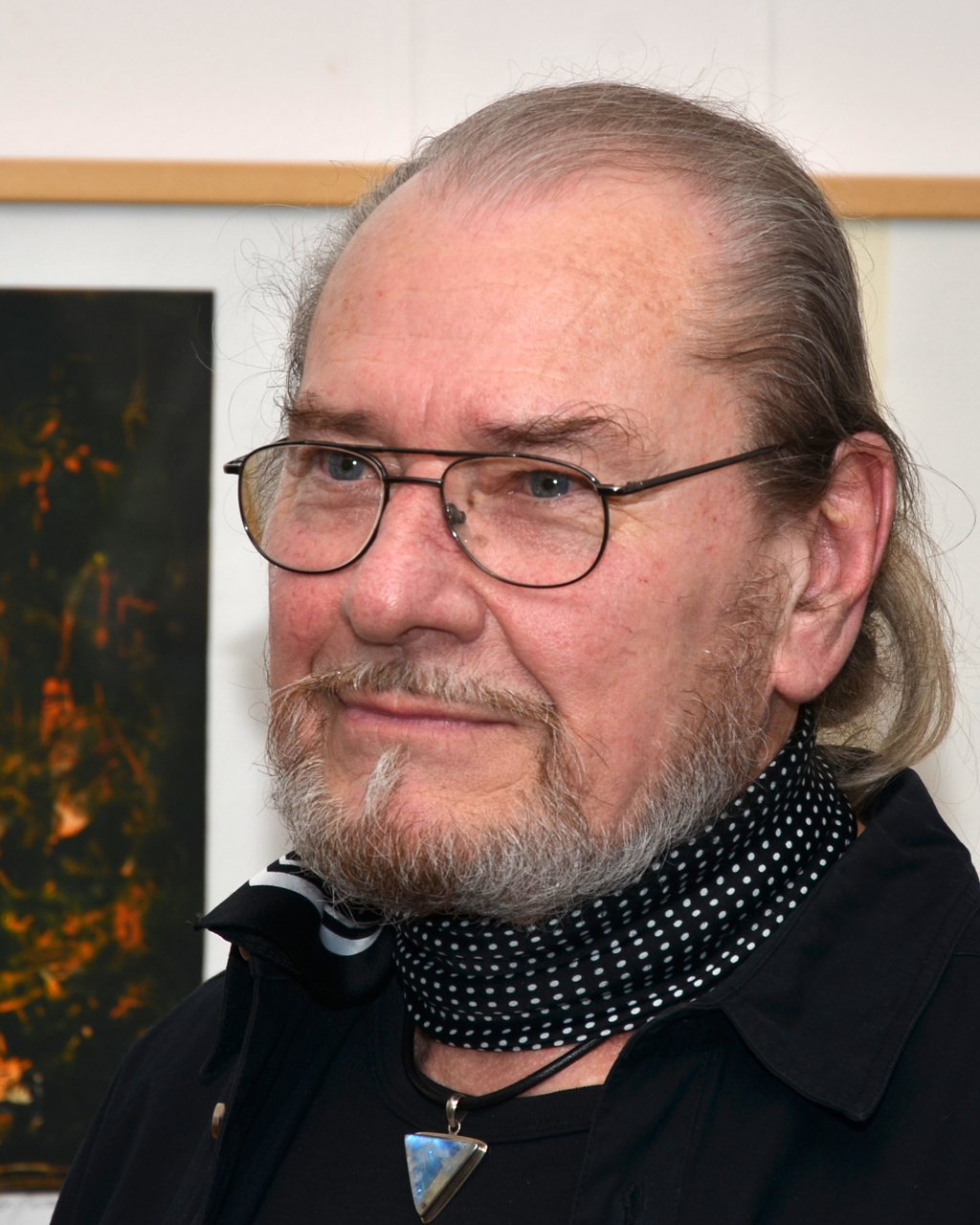
- Hamera in 2015
- Born: 3 March 1944; Úvaly, Protectorate of Bohemia and Moravia
- Died: 15 November 2021 (aged 77)
- Education: Printer, editor, scientific illustrator
- Awards: Jiří Kolář Prize for Literature (1971)

Oldřich Hamera (3 March 1944 – 15 November 2021) was a Czech printmaker, painter, illustrator, printer, typographer, publisher and restorer.

== Life ==
Hamera was born in Úvaly. He has been drawing living organisms and made prints of fossilized animals all his life and originally wanted to become a scientist. Because of his family background, he was not allowed to study and eventually trained as a machinist and machine repairman, but his interest in art and scientific fields such as paleontology, mineralogy, and medicine persisted.

After completing his basic military service, he worked at the state-owned company ČKD Trakce in Prague from 1964. Here he met Vladimír Merhaut, Josef Hampl and also Vladimír Boudník, who showed him graphic techniques and gave Hamera a printing press. In the same year he met Bohumil Hrabal and the company of unofficial and semi-official artists, art theoreticians and writers of the 1960s. Hrabal introduced Hamera to Jiří Kolář, and theoreticians Josef Zumer, Radko Pytlík, František Šmejkal and Antonín Hartmann.

Due to the protests against the invasion of Czechoslovakia by Warsaw Pact troops in 1968, he was forced to leave ČKD and took a position as technical editor at the Czechoslovak Centre for Construction and Architecture on Wenceslas Square in Prague. (Note: dissolved 1991) Due to his political views, however, he soon had to leave the post and became an ordinary worker. In 1973, he trained as a printer of small offset presses at Central Bohemia Printers (Note: dissolved after 1989) and began working at the Czechoslovak Centre for Construction and Architecture as a colour printer. For political reasons, however, he had to go into lower job grades, where he successively held positions as a copyist, photographer, bookbinder or yard worker. In the 1980s, he returned for a short time once more to the job of printer, but again had to move from it within the company to the department of catalogue sheets for construction as a technical editor and graphic designer. As a draughtsman he worked with the Department of Parasitology at the Faculty of Science, Charles University, in the 1970s.

In the late 1970s, the house where Hamera lived and had his studio was demolished. At the same time, his marriage went through a crisis and ended in divorce. Hamera continued to paint and draw and revived Boudník's samizdat publishing house Explosionalismus, where, in addition to texts by Hrabal, Klíma and bibliophilias dedicated mainly to Vladimír Boudník, he published The Intimate Diary of Karel Hynek Mácha, for which he received the Jiří Kolář Prize for Literature in 1971.

After the fall of the communist regime in 1989 he moved to Liberec, where he began working as an independent artist for Skloexport (Note: Skloexport, the only exporter of Czechoslovak glass, went bankrupt 1997) and other companies. In the mid-1990s he returned to Prague again. He devoted himself to applied graphic art, book illustration and lecturing. He appeared in documentaries and popular science films and participated in radio broadcasts. In December 2012 he underwent a liver transplant. He then gradually returned to painting, drawing and printmaking.

== Death ==
Hamera died on 15 November 2021.

== Work ==
=== Prints and monotypes ===
In the 1960s, when he acquired printing equipment from Vladimír Boudník, he first tried active and structural printmaking techniques after Boudník and tried his own distinctive contribution and various modifications of matrix preparation. Hamera soon began to break away from his teacher's influence in his monotypes with cycles on the themes of space, water worlds or the birth of matter. Later he developed his own original technique of layered monotype, where by gradually scanning the prints he reveals the different coloured layers previously applied to the matrix.

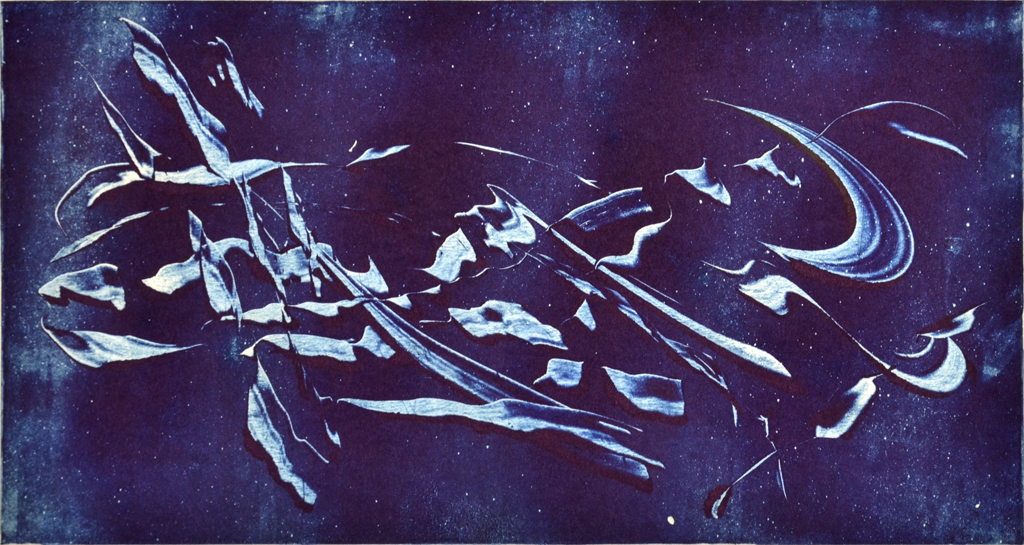
Universe, monotype, 1965

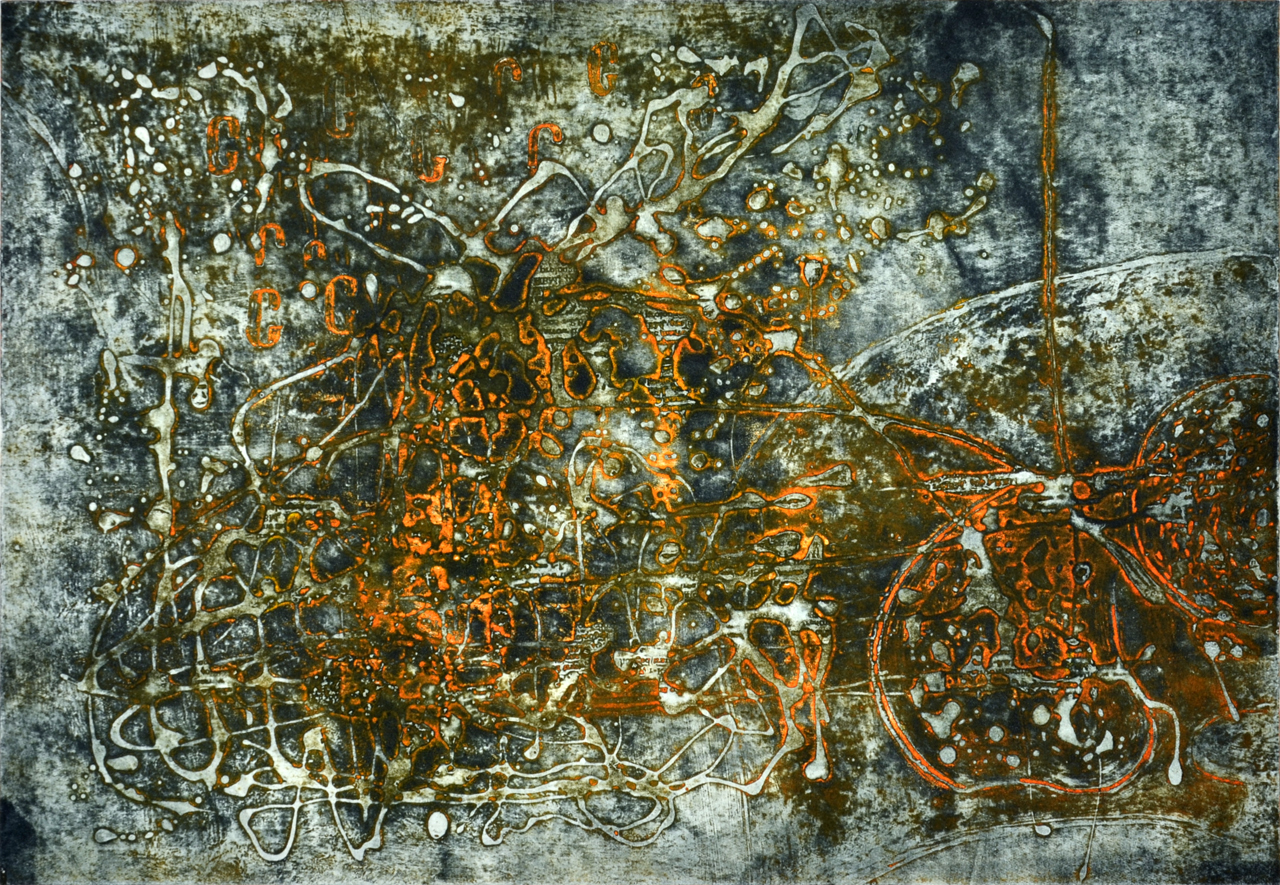
Bergamia praecedens, structural monotype, 1966

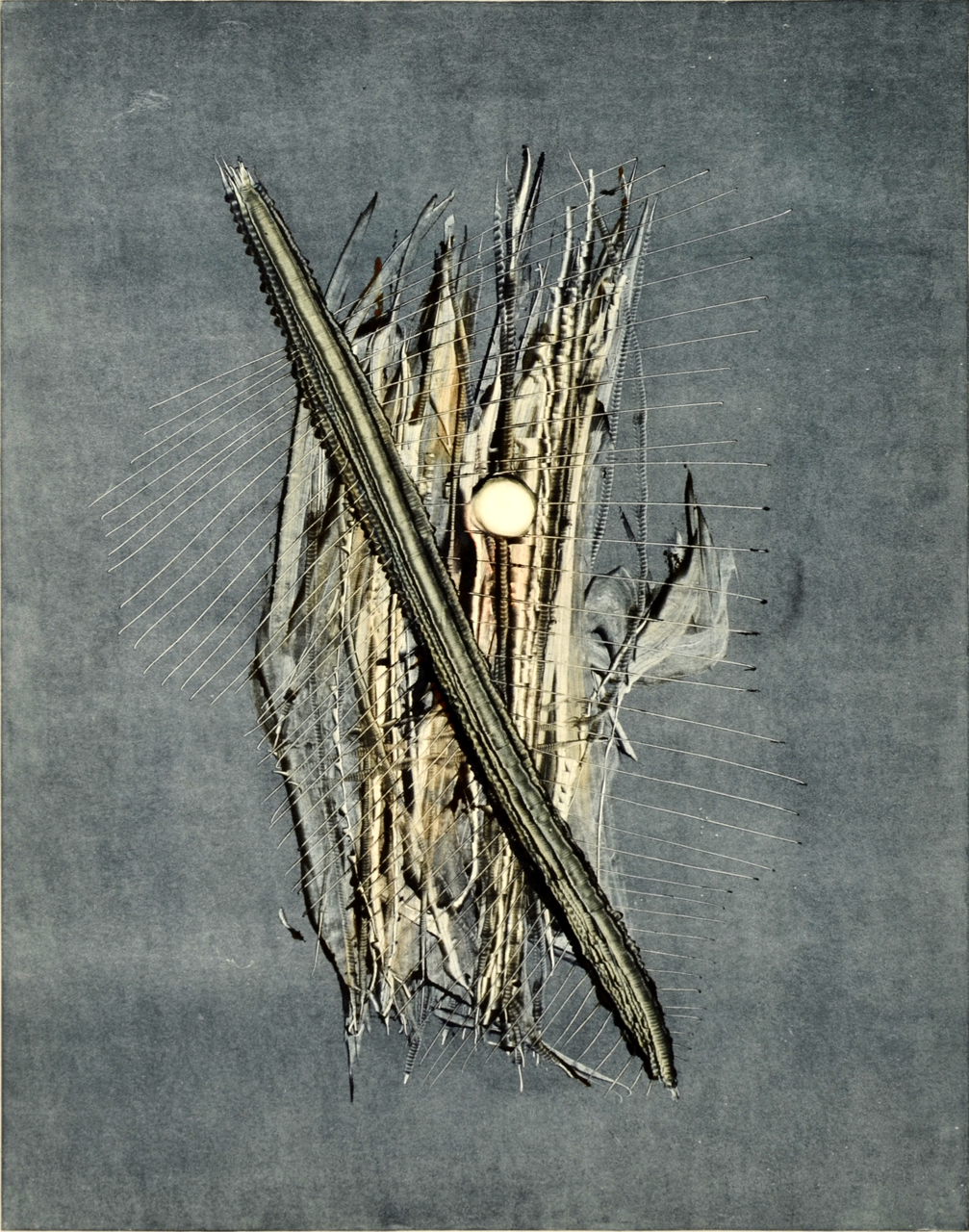
Untitled, monotype, 1971

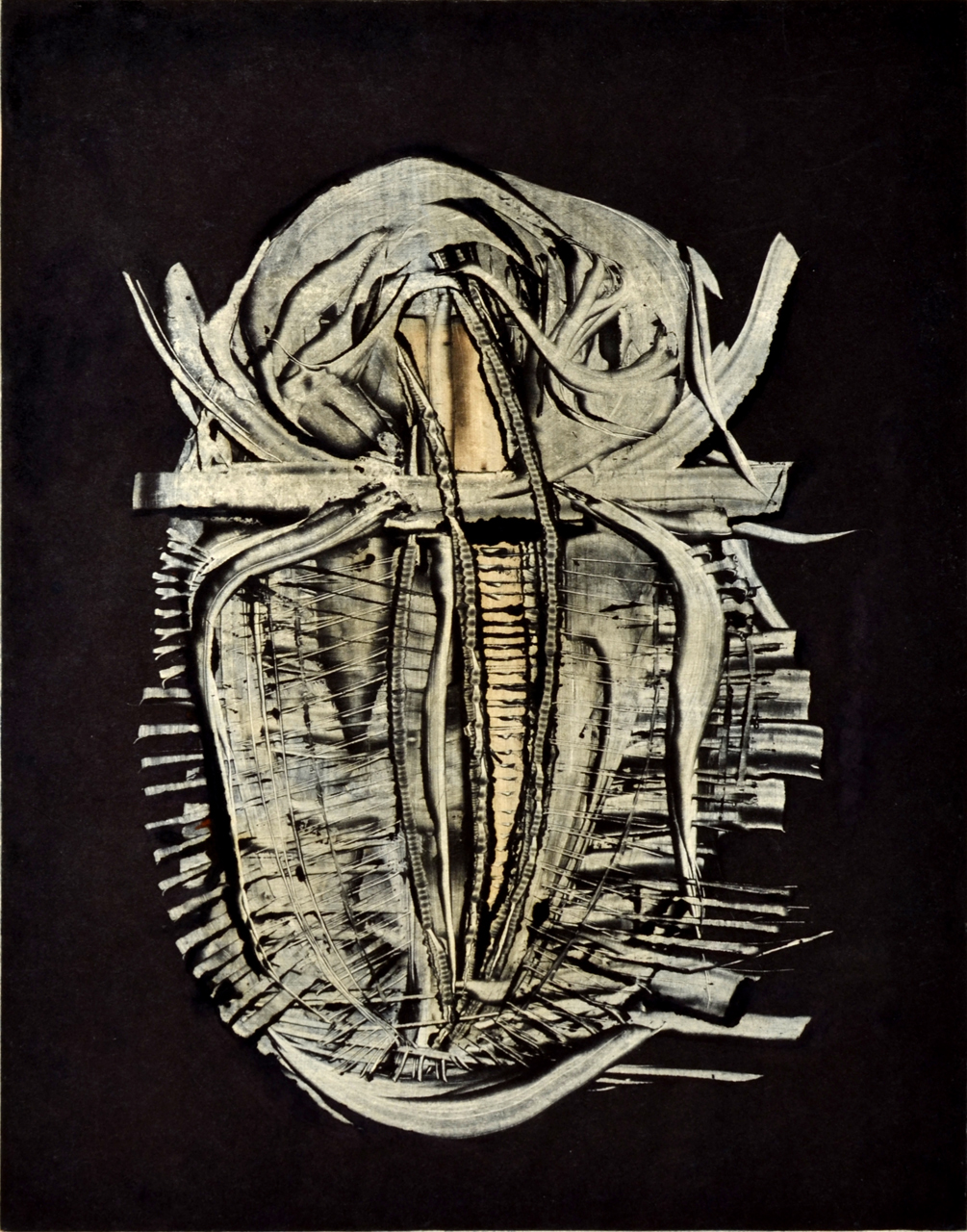
Individual, monotype, 1972

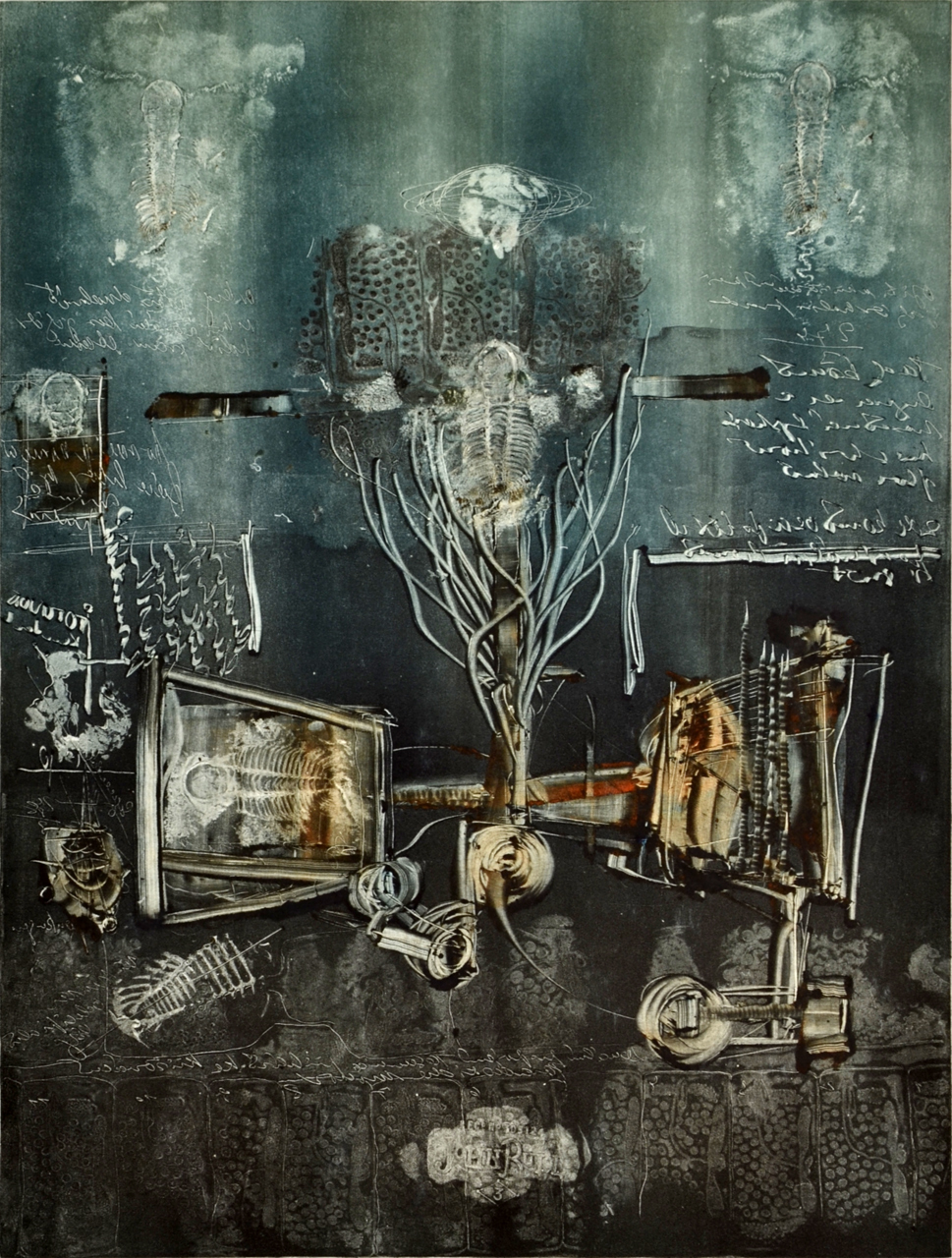
Crucified, monotype, 1972

Hamera's active etching technique works with low relief, which is created by etching a metal plate. On it, layers of colour are gradually rolled on, which the artist reverse-scans in the same way as when working with a monotype.

In the 1970s, Hamera drew on his fresh experience as an illustrator of scientific publications, and in his monotypes he refers to bizarre living organisms (the Tapeworm and Cosmology series) and especially to visually appealing paleontological finds such as trilobites and ammonites.

Since the mid-1970s, he has also worked on the restoration of important monuments in the Czech Republic (the Old Town Hall in Prague, Lemberk Castle). At the end of the seventies he completed the graphic design of the House of Jan Hus in Konstanz, but was not allowed to visit the monument itself.

He returned to natural history themes in the 1990s, when he collaged his prints with images from scientific publications. Often these were auto-collages using his own older scientific illustrations of trilobites, graptolites, orthoceras or ammonites. The colouring of Hamera's prints is muted and respects the hues of natural materials such as oxidized minerals, fossil imprints and soil dyes.

After 2000, he returned to the technique of active printmaking with works from the series " Roosters", where he used irregularly shaped matrices (Kicked Rooster, 2002). He also revisited structural monotypes. In 2010, an edition of Mácha's Máj illustrated with monotypes by Oldřich Hamera was published.

Hamera's derealisations use as source material the palaeontological tables of the Silurian system of Joachim Barrande with overprinting of his own matrices of structural graphics (Derealisations of Barrandien). He achieved a similar effect by derealizing musical scores or geographical atlases.

Vladimír Boudník and Bohumil Hrabal, whom Hamera remembered years later on the occasion of their anniversaries, appear in his most recent collages from 2014. Hamera depicts each of them in their own world, Hrabal as a pundit telling incredible stories, Boudník as a creator of original graphic sheets.

Oldřich Hamera is also the author of several graphic signs, decoration of the representative rooms of TV Nova and other realizations.

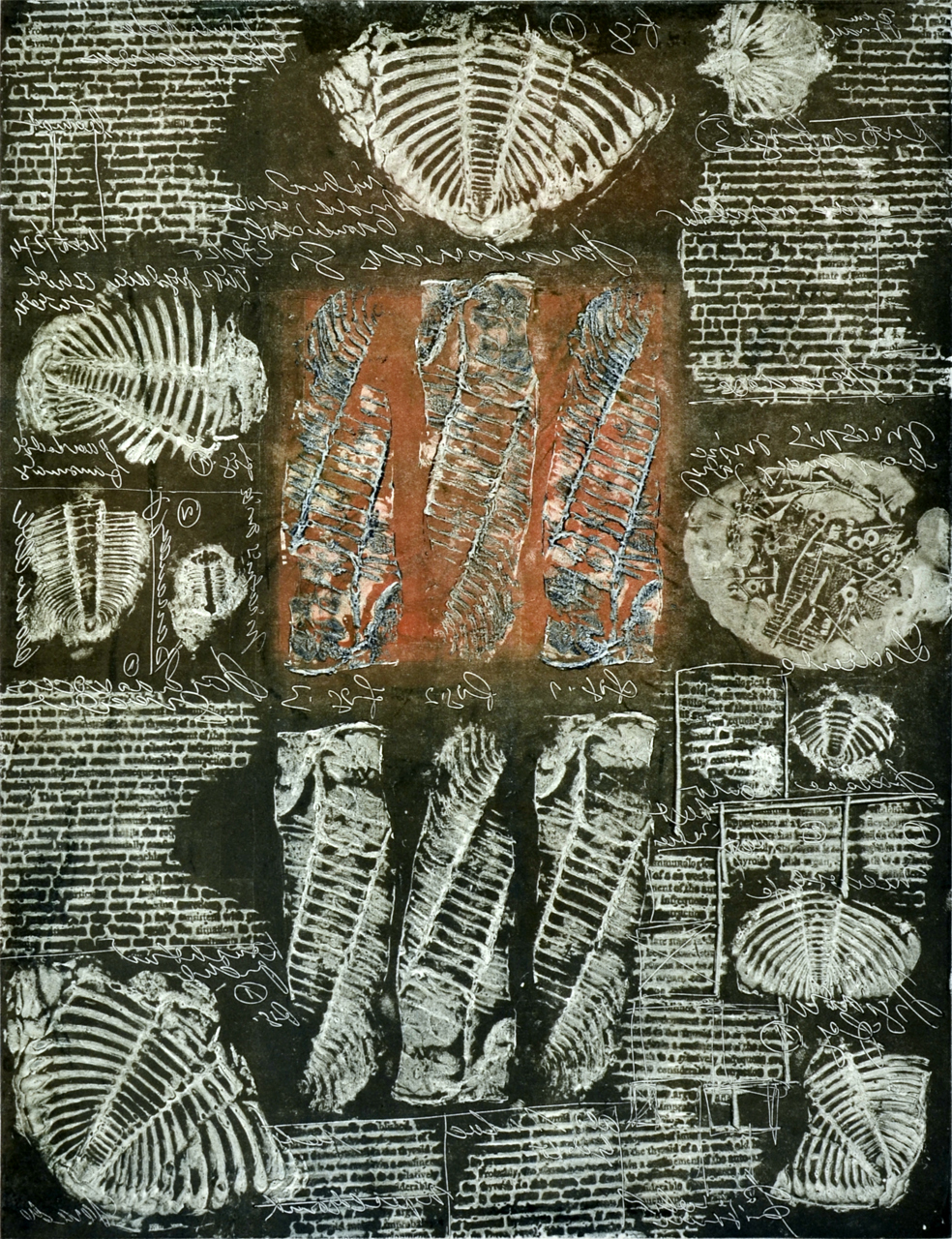
Collection Confrontation, monotype, 1985

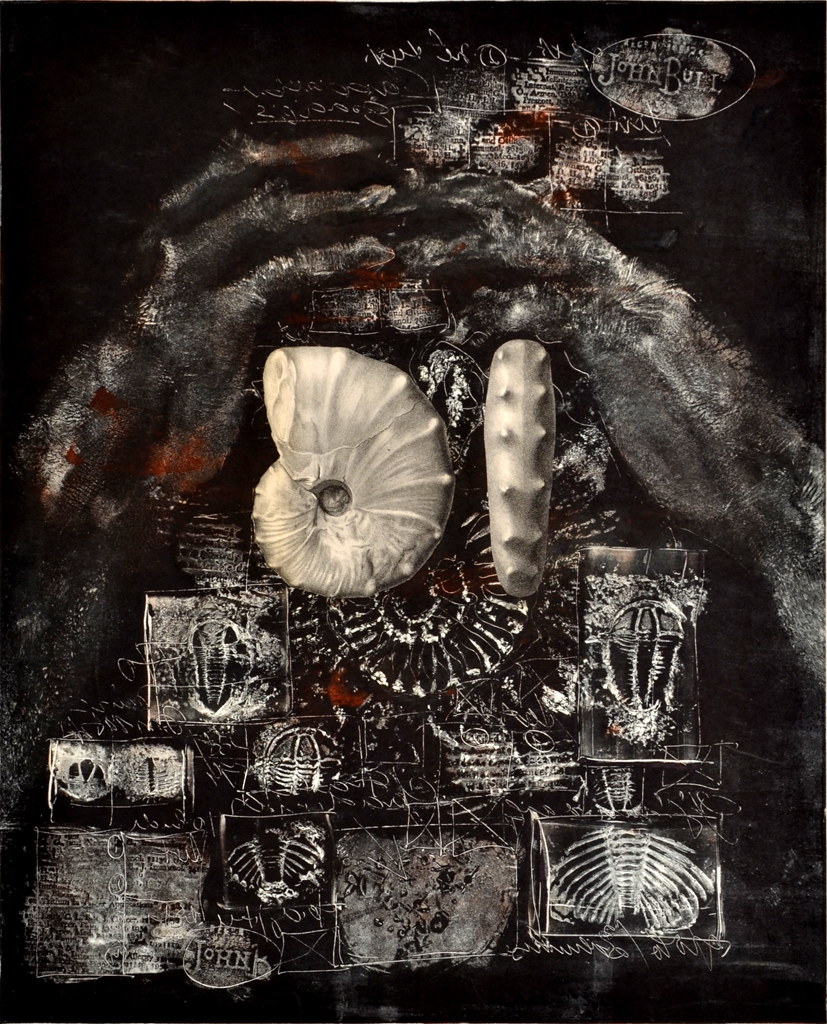
Untitled, monotype, collage, 39x32 cm, 1998

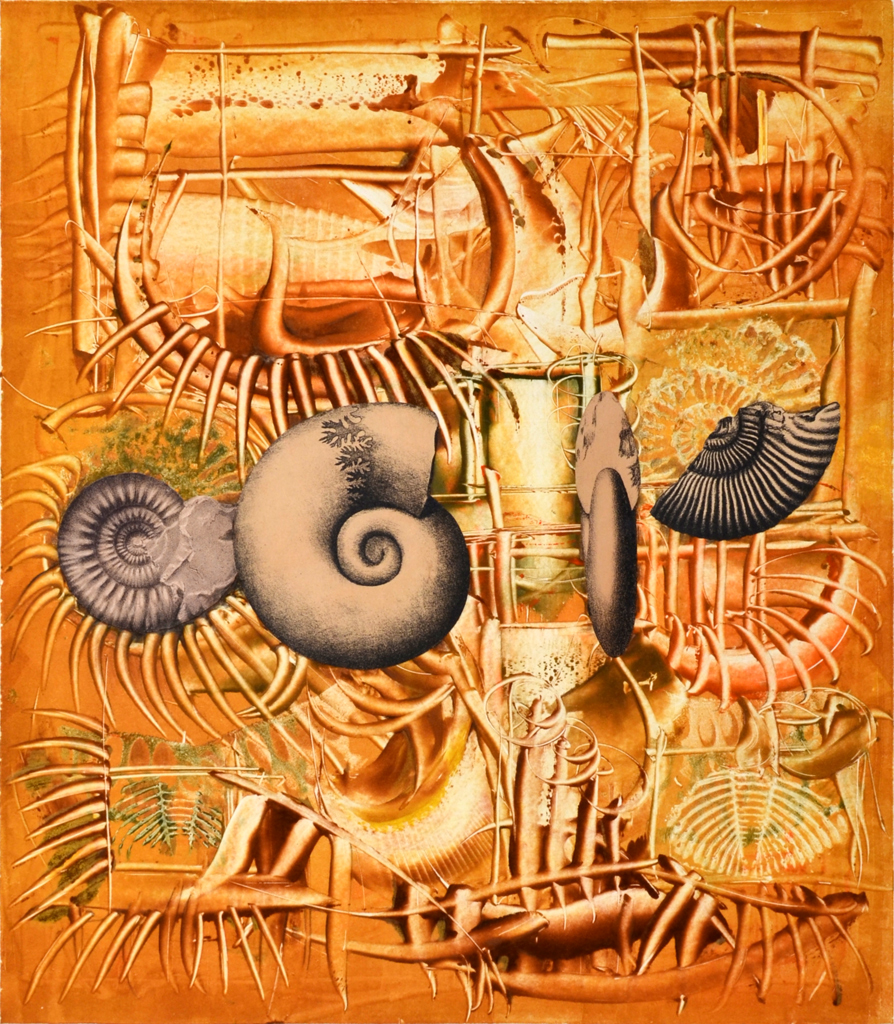
Untitled, monotype and autocollage, 2002

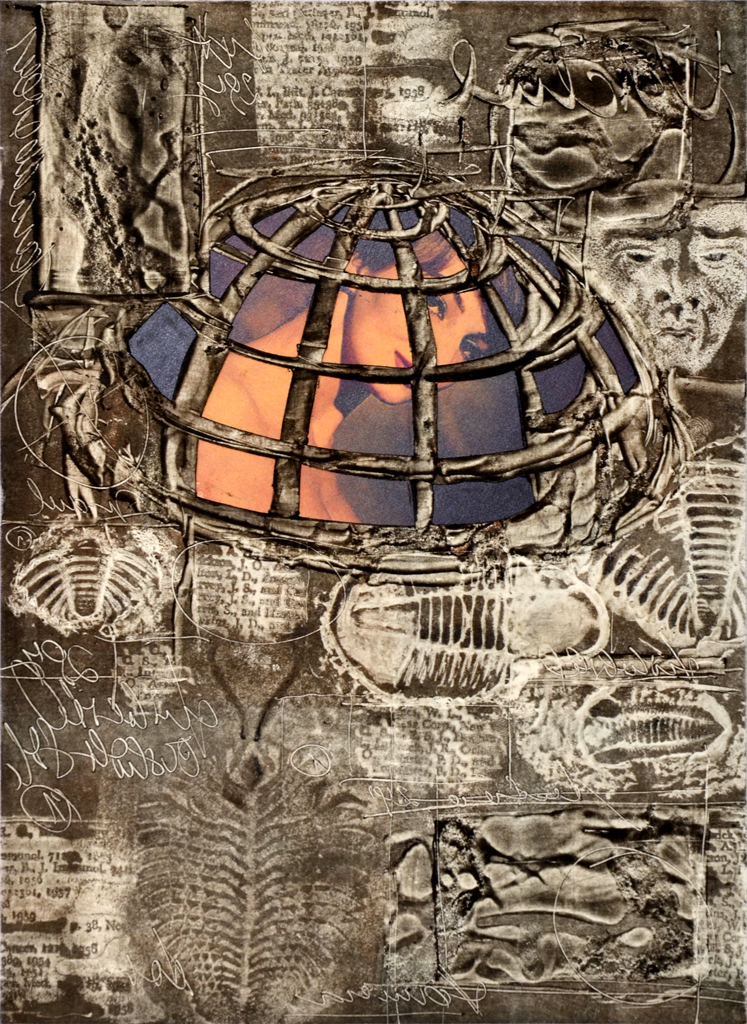
Madonna, active etching, collage, 2002

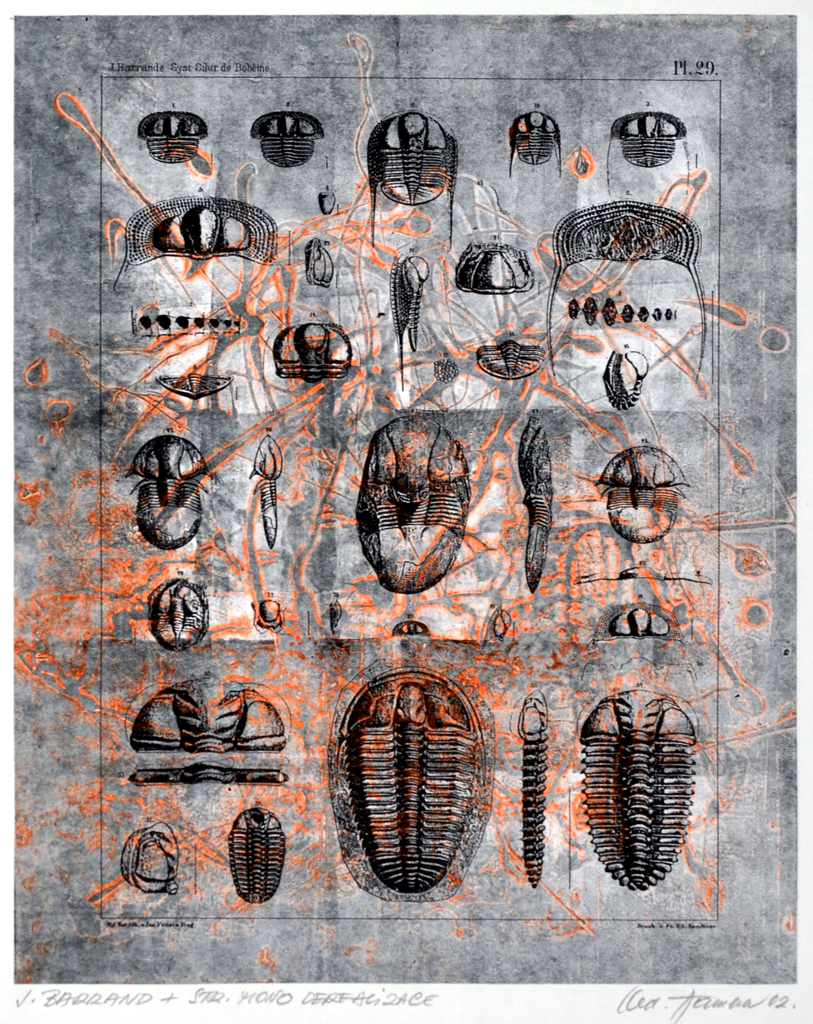
Derealization of Barrandien, structural monotype, 2002

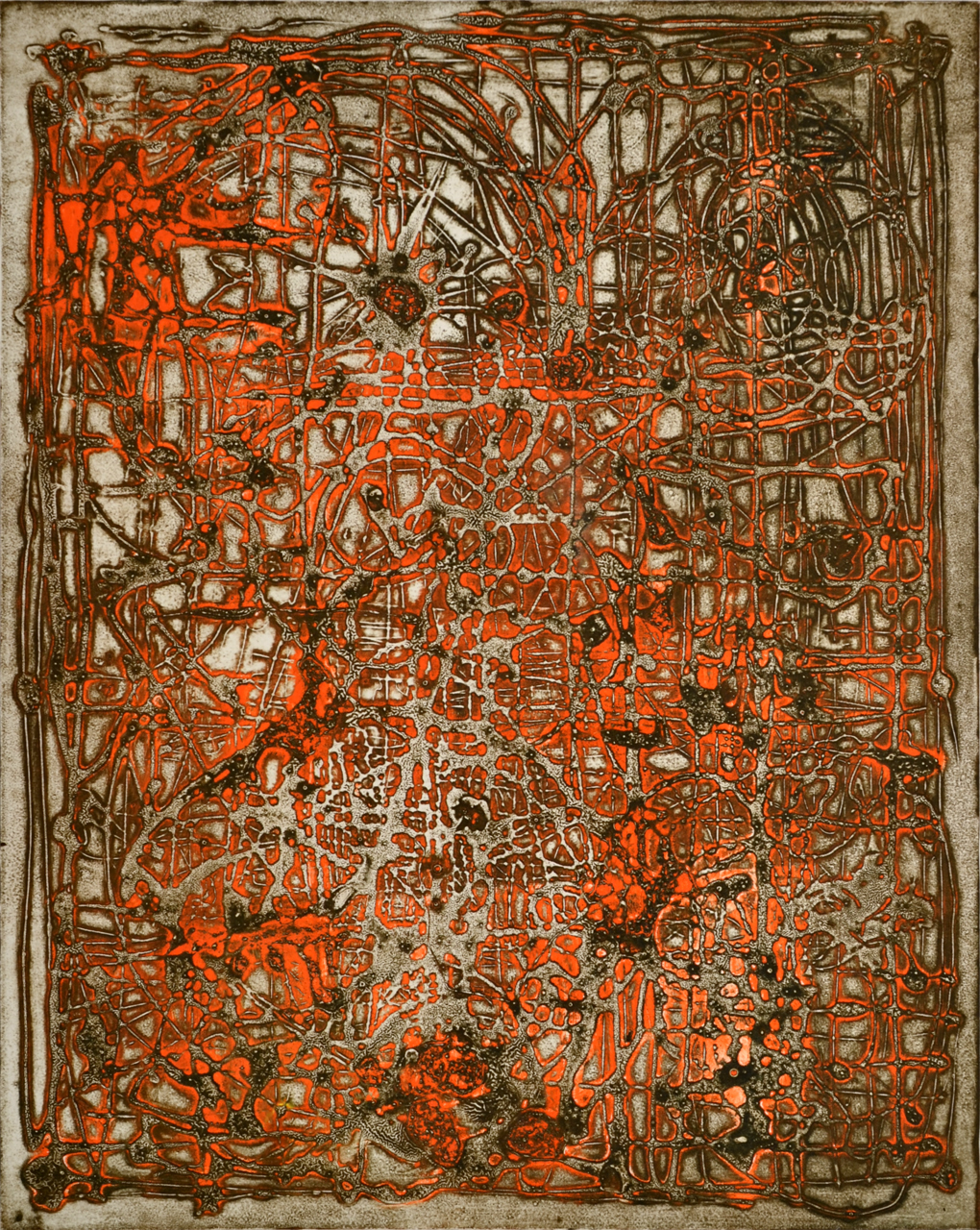
Untitled, structural monotype, 2007

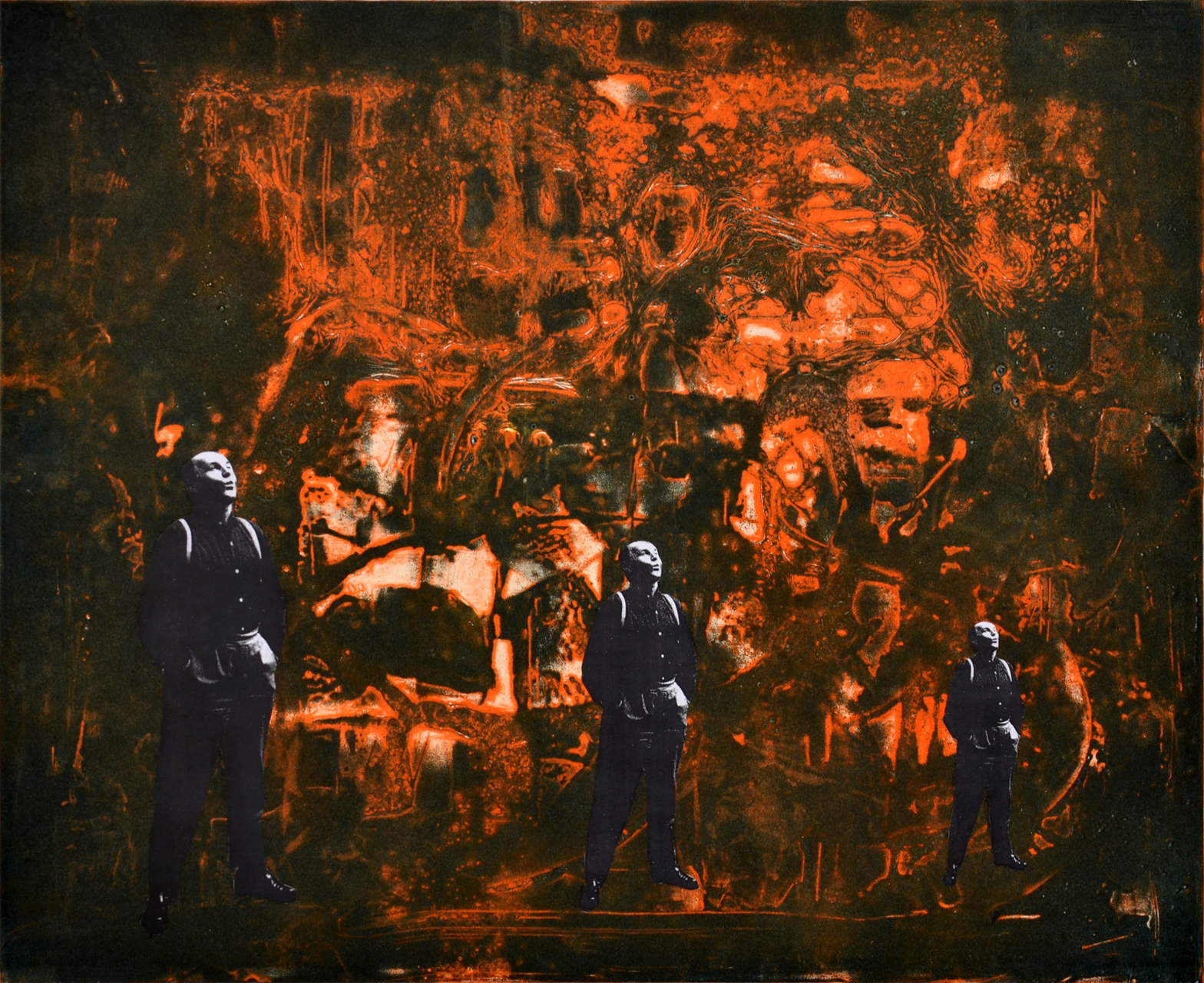
Beautiful Poldi, structural monotype and collage, 2013

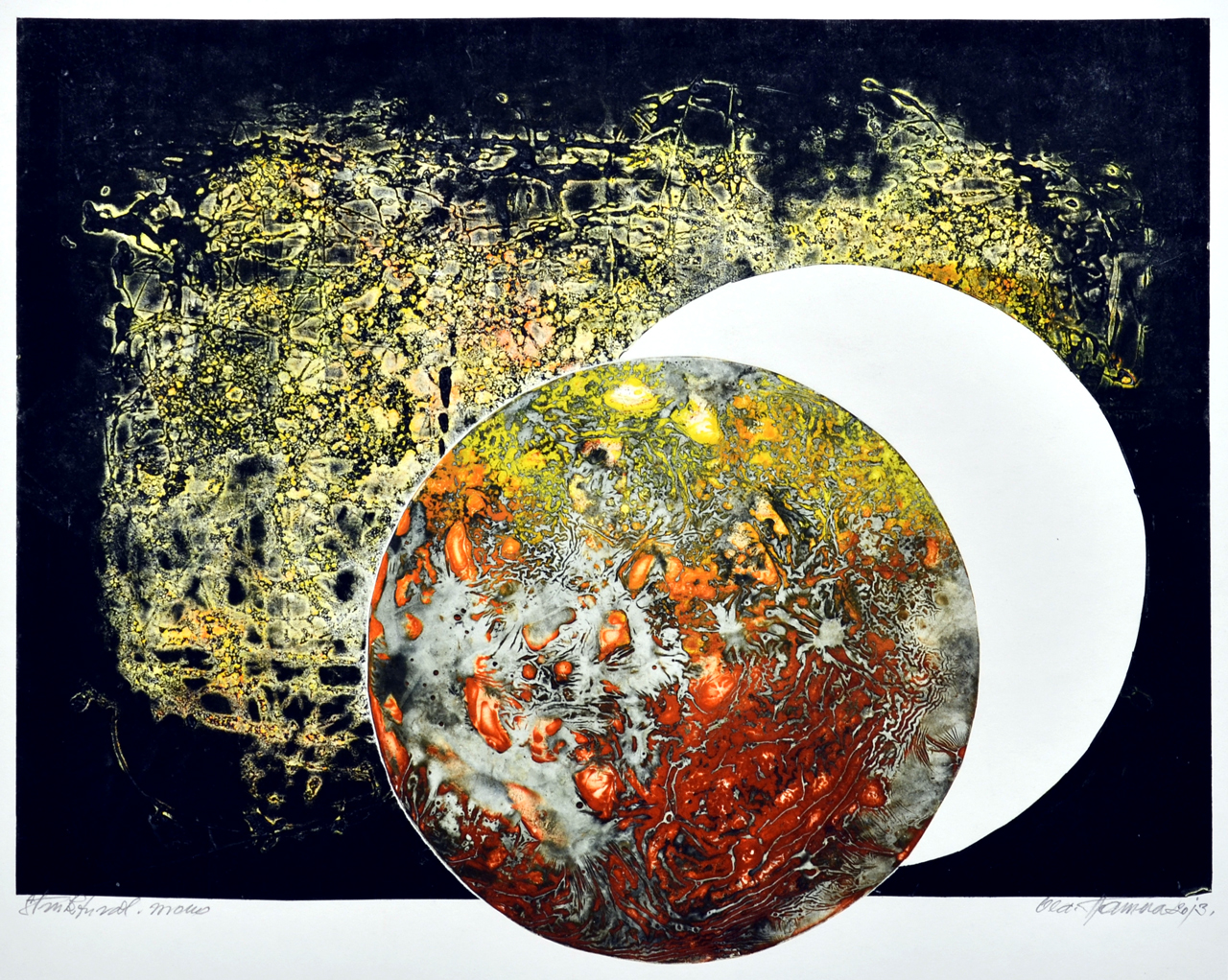
Planet, structural monotype, 2013

Graphic art by Olřich Hamera through the eyes of Bohumil Hrabal (from the introduction to the 1975 exhibition): "In Hamera's monotypes, one can trace the wetness of caves inhabited by the Proteus anguinus, the struggles of microbes and moulds, the smell of the compressed fauna and flora of mining shafts, where dripping from the walls and tangled wires and cables glisten in the corner. But in almost every monotype of Hamera's there is a trilobite, that beautiful greeting from the primordial mountains, a print that resembles a human skeleton, a crushed miner's lamp, the lacing of a hussar's coat, the trilobite as Hamera's signature and jingle, which has arced into the Barrandov rocks and thence into Hamera and, through his hands, into printmaking." (Bohumil Hrabal: A Tribute to Barrande).

=== Typographic work ===
Oldřich Hamera participated as a typographer in the editing of catalogues and anthologies published by the Ztichlá klika publishing house and in the publications of the Prague Imagination publishing house dedicated to Vladimír Boudník.

=== Publisher (selection) ===
- K. H. Mácha (diaries of Karel Hynek Mácha with illustrations by Jiří Kolář), 40 p., samizdat, 1976
- Boudník, Vladimír: Corpus delicti, 1974, samizdat
- Ladislav Klíma: Cholupický den, 1976, samizdat
- Pravoslav Kotík: Portrait of a Czech Artist, 1976, samizdat, compiled, introductory text by Bohumil Hrabal
- In Memory of Jaroslav Kladiva, with texts by Karel Marysky "For Ph. Dr. Jaroslav Kladiva" and Hrabal's literary collage "The Rite of Spring", 1987, samizdat
- Hrabal, Bohumil: A Love Letter, The Oracle, 1987, samizdat, with his own roulades
- Hrabal, Bohumil: The Swan of Avon, 1989, samizdat
- To Jiří Kolář on his 75th birthday, with texts by Jan Skácel, "Thanks", "Not a Day" by Karel Šiktanec, "Letter to a Friend" by Bohumil Hrabal and "Report on the Slavia Café" by Ludvík Vaculík, with his own monotype: Tribute to Jiří Kolář with John Bull motif and roulades by Jiří Kolář.
- Homage to Vladimír Boudník, 1989, samizdat
- Josef Jira :60, 1989, samizdat
- Hrabal, Bohumil: Grayhound story, 1989, samizdat
- Hrabal, Bohumil: Hrabal's Letter to Dubenc from November 1989, samizdat
- Michael Rittstein, drawings by Michael Rittstein, 1980s
- Klíma, Ladislav: Jsem absolutní vůle, date illegible, together with V. Zadrobílek
- Váchal, Josef: Vademecum, Prague 1978, together with V. Zadrobílek
- Participation in the preparation: Nezval, Vítězslav: Sexual Nocturne, samizdat, undated

=== Montages on books ===
- Josef Váchal - Enchanted Sumava. First edition of unpublished text. Printed by Mirek Bujárek, graphic design by V. Z., montage by Oldřich Hamera. Edition of 110 copies, published in 1985
- Josef Váchal - Orbis pictus. Facsimile of Váchal's print (slightly reduced) from 1932. Cover by the publisher, edition of 120 copies. Mounting of lithographs by Oldřich Hamera. Before the publisher's afterword photo by Bohdan Holomíček. Published in 1985.

=== Illustrations ===
- Zapletal Zdeněk: Born in ČSR, or, Vekslštůbe cimrfraj, Akropolis Prague 1994, ISBN 80-85770-10-5
- Pilzová Markéta: Stigmata of the Soul, Eminent Prague 2000, ISBN 80-7281-040-5
- Kuchař Jiří: Santo Daimé - Posleství z druhého břehu, Prague 2001, ISBN 80-7281-063-4
- Pilzová Markéta: Phoenix, Eminent Prague 2002, ISBN 80-7281-098-7
- Holan Vladimír: Noc s Hamletem, Dokořán Prague 2004, ISBN 80-86569-19-5
- Brzáková Pavlína: Larch Soul, Eminent Prague 2004, ISBN 80-7281-194-0
- Brzáková Pavlína: Two Worlds, Eminent Praha 2008, ISBN 978-80-7281-370-4
- Cílek, Václav: Kameny a hvězdy, Dokořán Praha 2014, ISBN 978-80-7363-603-6

=== Illustrations on the cover ===
- Dubský, Ivan: Discourse on the Theme of One Theorem of Klim and Other Essays, Prague Imagination 1991, ISBN 80-7110-034-X
- Boudník, Vladimír: Z literární pozůstalosti, Prague Imagination 1993, ISBN 80-7110-118-4
- Boudník, Vladimír: Z korespondence I, (1949-1956), Prague Imagination 1994, ISBN 80-7110-140-0
- Boudník, Vladimír: Z korespondence II, (1957-1968), Pražská imaginace 1994, ISBN 80-7110-141-9
- Popel Richard: Paradýzo ztracené a znovunalezené, Akropolis Prague 2000, ISBN 9788086903798

=== Restoration (selection) ===
- Savings Bank in Rytířská Street - entrance portals with balustrade
- Hotel Merkur - realization of stone columns in the atrium of the restaurant
- Old Town Hall - replacement of ribs in neo-Gothic windows
- Strahov Monastery - stonework for the Premonstratensian Order
- F. Kafka Theatre - restoration of stone elements
- House U Bílého koníčka in Karlova Street - restoration of the Gothic staircase
- Bank building Na Příkopech - restoration of granite tiles
- Lemberk Castle - installation of Baroque windows and lining, stone and stucco work
- Žatec Town Hall - restoration of Gothic ribs in the entrance part of the building
- Plague column in Holýšov (together with Tomáš Rasl and Jana Kremanová)

=== Design and realizations ===
- 1979 Exhibition: fine art and music, Theatre of Music, together with Vladimír Lébl, presented to the Mrs. Martinů Foundation
- 1989 Realization of the representative rooms of Pragomont, interior design and decoration, utility objects
- 1995 Decoration of the representative rooms of TV Nova
- 1997 Participation in the decoration of the Čs. Savings Bank
- 1998 Participation in the decoration of the bank, Národní třída, Perštýn
- 1998 Design and participation in the realization of a large-scale painting on the wall of the District Office for Prague 10, with students of the VŠUP
- 1999 Participation in the decoration of the First Prague Gasworks
- 2005 Decoration of the law office Havel, Kuchař, Ryšavá and partner s.r.o.

=== Representation in collections ===
- National Gallery in Prague
- Pratt Graphics Center in New York
- Regional Gallery in Liberec
- Benedikt Rejt Gallery in Louny
- Gallery of Fine Arts in Cheb
- Museum of National History in Nymburk
- Collection of the Prague Gas Works

=== Exhibitions (selection) ===
- 1967 Institute of Microbiology, Czechoslovak Academy of Sciences, Prague
- 1970 Regional Gallery Liberec
- 1976 Collections, Veterinary Research Institute, Brno
- 1976 Memory of Matter, Theatre of Music, Prague
- 1979 Monotypes, Central Institute of Geology of the Czechoslovak Academy of Sciences, Prague
- 1996 Duna Museum, Esztergom, Hungary
- 1999 Fossils from the collections of the North Bohemian Museum - Oldřich Hamera "Monotypes"; North Bohemian Museum, Liberec
- 2003 Monotypes, Town Hall, Frýdlant
- 2005 Mácha's May, Průmyslový palác, Prague
- 2006 Derealization of Barrandien, Akropolis Palace, Prague
- 2006 Monotypes by O. Hamer, Industrial Palace, Prague
- 2006 Oldřich Hamera. On the occasion of his seventieth birthday, Lucerna Palace, Prague
- 2013 Oldřich Hamera. On his seventieth birthday, Ztichlá klika Gallery, Prague
- 2014 Prints by Olřich Hamera through the eyes of Bohumil Hrabal, Czech Centre, Munich, Germany
- 2014 Barrandien through the eyes of Oldřich Hamera, Homeland Museum in Beroun
- 2014 Mácha's May in Oldřich Hamera's monotypes, K. H. Mácha, Litoměřice
- 2015 Wrinkling. Graphic art by Oldřich Hamera, Smečky Gallery, Prague
- 2015 Oldřich Hamera. Mácha's May in Monotypes, K. H. Mácha in Doksy

Oldřich Hamera has participated in dozens of joint exhibitions since 1967, for a selection see abART.

== Sources ==
=== Monograph ===
- Oldřich Hamera, text Eva Čapková, 256 p., 321 il., Arbor Vitae, Prague 2019, ISBN 978-80-88256-11-3

=== Catalogues ===
- Oldřich Hamera: Monotypes, Hrabal Bohumil, Kroutvor Josef, cat. 16 p., Central Institute of Geology, Prague 1979
- Oldřich Hamera: Monotypes, Caillois Roger, Kroutvor Josef, cat. 4 p., Theatre of Music, Prague 1979
- Oldřich Hamera: Monotypes, Rous Jan, cat. 4 p., Na Chmelnici Theatre, Prague 1988
- Vysočanský okruh, Vladimír Boudník, Machalický Jiří, Hrabal Bohumil, cat. 58 p., National Gallery in Prague and Gallery of the Capital City of Prague, Prague 1992
- Oldřich Hamera, 2014, Rak Štěpán, Čapková Eva, Cílek Václav, cat. 32 p., Beroun 2014
- Wrinkling. Graphic art by Oldřich Hamera, Čapková Eva, cat. unnumbered, Smečky Gallery, Gallery publishing house, Prague 2015
- Oldřich Hamera and friends. Recycling.Text Lubomír Krupka, Miroslava Krupková, Eva Čapková, Hana Klimešová, Oldřich Hamera, 87 p., Maldoror Gallery Prague 2021, ISBN 978-80-903469-8-7

=== Articles ===
- Hamera Oldřich, Popel Jiří, Placák Jan, Stankovič Andrej, Fecurka Konstantin, Groch Erich, Stryko Marcel, Ztichlá klika 1, samizdat anthology, 140 p., edited by Jan Placák, Ztichlá klika, Prague
- Karlík Viktor, Hamera Oldřich, Placák Jan, On mne tu satinýrku dal (RR interview), Revolver Revue 29,1995/09, 192-210 [1]
- Cílek Václav: Stones in the Time of Dreaming. A word on the catalogue of Oldřich Hamera's exhibition. Minerál, Vol. 6, No. 1 (1998), pp. 57–58.

=== Publications ===
- Karel Hynek Mácha, Máj, Oldřich Hamera, monotypes, nakl. Triáda, 2010, ISBN 978-80-87256-40-4 [2]
- Nešlehová Mahulena, The Message of Another Expression (The Concept of Informel in Czech Art of the 1950s and the First Half of the 1960s), Artefact, Prague 1997, ISBN 80-902160-0-5
