= Úvaly Railway Bridge =

- Viadukt Devět kanálů (Czech)
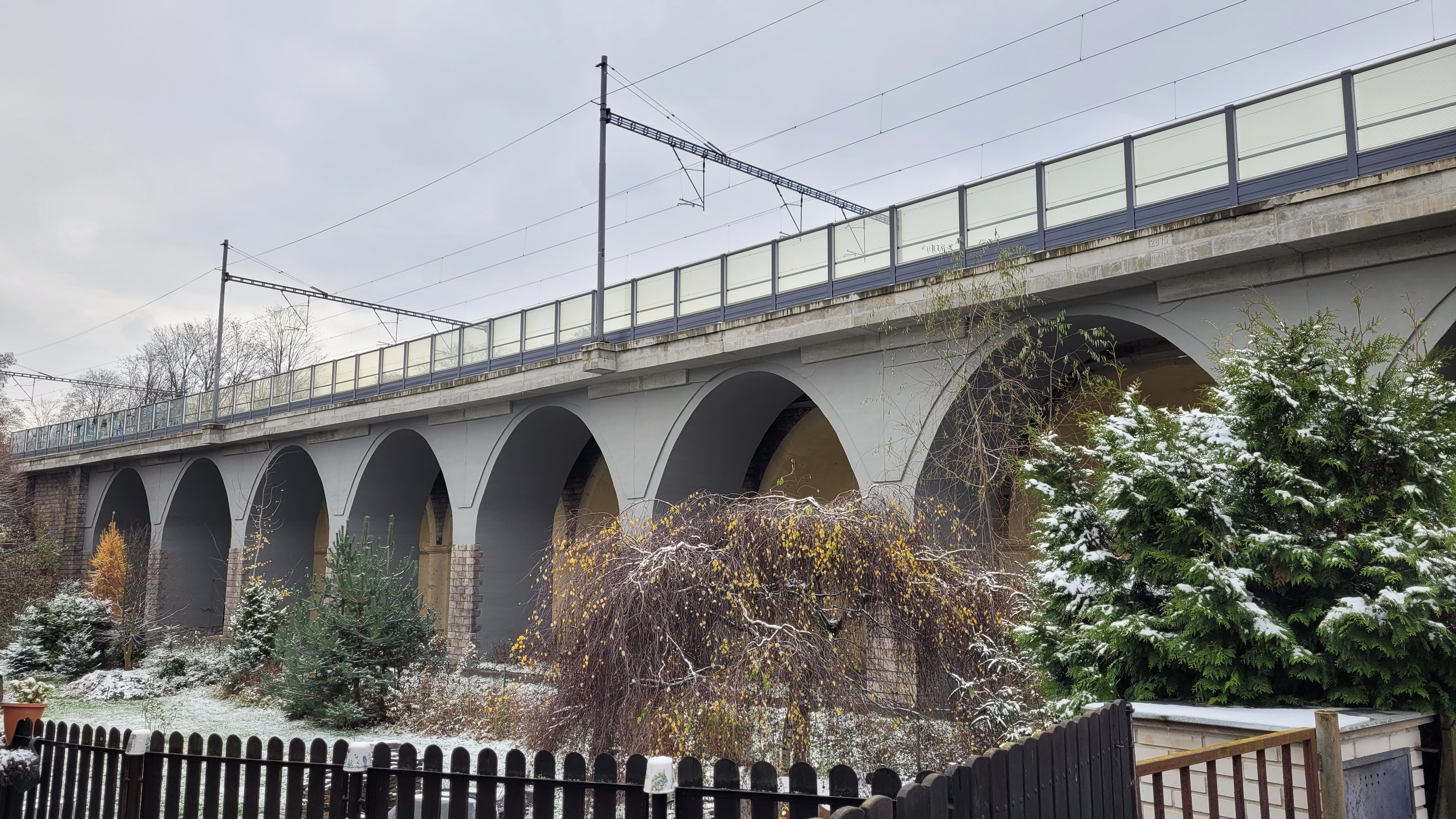
- Northern part of the bridge
- Interactive map of Úvaly Railway Bridge
- 50°4′17.24″N 14°43′43.16″E
- Type: railway bridge
- Location: Úvaly

History
- Built: 1844

Site notes
- Area: Central Bohemian Region, Czech Republic
- Architect: Jan Perner

The Úvaly Railway Bridge (Czech: Úvalský železniční viadukt, also known as Devět kanálů) is a railway bridge in Úvaly in the Czech Republic. It is located on the Prague–Kolín railway line.

The structure is 135 m (443 ft) long, built in a slight arc over the valley of the Výmola river. The bridge was built in 1844 out of sandstone and granite blocks, reaching a height of 13 m (43 ft). This section of the railway line between Pardubice and Prague was entrusted to chief engineer Jan Perner, who designed the bridge. A second concrete bride was built 1.5 m (4 ft 11 in) away from the structure in 1954–1955, due to an expansion of the line, the addition of a third track to that section of the railway.

Since 2008, it has been a cultural monument of the Czech Republic.
