= Hitonari Tsuji =

Japanese writer, composer, and film director

Hitonari Tsuji 辻仁成
- Born: October 4, 1959 (age 66); Tokyo, Japan
- Occupations: Novelist; film director; composer; professor; painter; editor
- Spouses: Kaho Minami (m. 1995; div. 2000) Miho Nakayama (m. 2002; div. 2014)
- Children: 2
- Writing career
- Pen name: Jinsei Tsuji
- Genres: Literature; Historical fiction; romance
- Notable works: Pianissimo (1990); Light on the Strait (1997); The White Buddha (1997); Calmi Cuori Appassionati Blu (1999); Good Bye See You Someday (2001)
- Website: www.j-tsuji-h.com

Hitonari Tsuji (辻 仁成, Tsuji Hitonari; born 1959) is a Japanese writer, composer, musician, painter and film director. In his film and singing work he uses the art name Jinsei Tsuji, an alternative reading his given name. His novels and essays have been bestsellers in Japan as well as overseas, with his work being translated into 20 languages and selling over ten million copies.

He has directed ten films including Hotoke (ほとけ) (2001) and Filament (フィラメント) (2002) which were officially presented at the 51st Berlinale and the 37th Karlovy Vary International Film Festival where he won a special mention in the Ecumenical Jury Award category.

Additionally, Tsuji launched a web magazine entitled Design Stories and in 2016, for which he is currently the editor and chief.

== Personal life ==
Tsuji was born in Tokyo in 1959. He originally found success as vocalist, singer and songwriter for the rock band ECHOS which he formed in 1981. ECHOS' hit song "ZOO" has sold over a million copies.

In addition to music and writing Tsuji was a professor at Kyoto University of Art and Design from 2007 to 2016.

Tsuji was married to actress Kaho Minami from 1995 to 2000. Together they have one son. He was married to singer and actress Miho Nakayama from 2002 to 2014 and resided together in Paris, France. Tsuji has a son from this marriage as well. After their divorce, Tsuji continued to live in Paris, retaining custody of their son.

== Career ==
=== Writing ===
Tsuji published his first novel, Pianissimo in 1989. His debut work won the 13th Subaru Prize for Literature (Subaru Bungaku Sho) in 1990. In 1997, he was awarded the 116th Akutagawa Prize for Kaikyo no Hikari (Light from the Straits).

In 1999, he was awarded the Prix Femina Award, a prestigious French literary prize, in the foreign novel category, for the French translation of Le Boudda blanc (The White Buddha, or Hakubutsu, published by Mercure de France). He is the first Japanese writer to win the Prix Femina Award.

In 2003, his seven short stories were published in the French literary magazine Je Bouquine.

In 2005, he was selected by French literary magazine LIRE as one of the world’s 50 prospective novelists.

In 2005, his serial novel was featured in the South Korean newspaper The Hankyoreh. Tsuji is the first Japanese native novelist to have his work published in The Hankyoreh.

In 2011, Tsuji wrote a children’s book called In Rapet’s World dedicated to children who were struck by the 2011 Tōhoku earthquake.

=== Film ===
In the 1980s, Tsuji started producing independent films through his college’s movie club.

In 1999, his directorial debut, Sennen-Tabito (for which he did the direction, screenwriting, and music) was presented as an official invitation film for the 56th International Critic week of the Venice Film Festival.

In 2001, his movie Hotoke (director, writer, and music) was presented as an official selection in the 51st Berlin International Film Festival, in the Panorama section. In the same year, Hotoke was presented to the Deauville Asian Film Festival, in the Competition section, and won best image award. The film was featured in the 27th Seattle International Film Festival.

In 2002, his movie Filament (director, screenwriter, music) was submitted to the 37th Czech Karlovy Vary International Film Festival in the Official Selection Competition section and awarded the International Ecumenical Jury of the Christian Churches.

Tsuji also wrote and directed a TV movie titled Mokka no Koibito in 2002.

In summer 2008, his other movie Acacia was produced; it was presented at the 22nd Tokyo International Film Festival in the Competition section in 2009.

In 2010, his movie Paris Tokyo Paysage was produced and submitted to the 7th Festival du cinéma japonais contemporain Kinotayo (2012-2013) and awarded the Prix de la meilleure image (best cinematography).

=== Painting ===
Tsuji began oil painting in the 1970s while still in high school and used a barn at his family home as a gallery to exhibit his works. Combining painting, photography, and writing, he gradually developed a distinctive visual language in his artistic practice.

He later established a studio in Normandy, where he continued to develop his painting. Inspired by the landscapes of the region, his works explore themes of memory, time, and the invisible traces that transcend generations. His paintings have notably attracted the attention of the Japanese painter Hiroshi Senju.

Official web gallery

== Works ==
=== Novels (Japanese editions) ===
- Pianissimo (1990)
- Cloudy (1990)
- Kai no Omochyabako (1991)
- Tabibito no Ki (1992)
- Fragile (1992)
- Glasswool no Shiro (1993)
- Hahanaru Nagi to Chichinaru Zika (1994)
- Open house (1994)
- Ai ha Pride yori tsuyoku (1995)
- Passagio (1995)
- Sabita Sekai no Guidebook (1995)
- Newton no Ringo (1996)
- Antinoise (1996)
- Kyō no Kimochi (1996)
- Kaikyō no Hikari (1997)
- Ai no Kumen (1997)
- Hakufutsu (1997)
- Wild Flower (1998)
- Sennenn Tabibito (1999)
- Reisei to Zyonetu no Aida Blue (1999)
- Shitto no Kaori (2000)
- Ai wo kudasai (2000)
- Sayonara Itsuka (2001)
- Koisuru tame ni umareta (2001)
- Taiyō Machi (2001)
- Mokka no Koibito (2002)
- Ai to Eien no Aoisora (2002)
- Kanojo wa Uchyūfuku wo kitenemuru (2002)
- O'keeffe no Koibito Ozwald no Tsuioku (2003)
- 99sai made ikita Akanbō (2003)
- Ima Kono Syunkan Aishiterutoiukoto (2003)
- Katana (2004)
- Daihitsy Ya (2004)
- Koufuku na Ketsumatsu (2005)
- Acacia Ashita no Yakusoku (2005)
- Yada to Iiyo (2005)
- Ai no atoni Kurumono (2006)
- Pianissimo Pianissimo (2007)
- Hito ha Omoide ni nomi shittosuru (2007)
- Ugan (2008)
- Madam to Okusama (2009)
- Mokka no Koibito (2009)
- Dahlia (2009)
- Acacia no Hana no sakidasukoro Acacia (2009)
- Kuroe to Enzō (2010)
- Get Far Away from Me (2011)
- Eiensha (2012)
- Mistake (2012)
- Two People in the Future (2013) *Original novel of the movie “Two People in the Future”
- The Unfading Dream We Have (2014) *Original novel of the movie “The Unfading Dream We Have”
- The Date Line (1st and 2nd volume) (2015)
- Eggman (2017)

=== Novels (English edition) ===
- Pianissimo by Hitonari Tsuji, translated by Rebecca Clare Lindsay, Shueisha Inc. 1992 ISBN 978-4-08-749812-7

=== Films (Japanese edition) ===
- Tenshi no Wakemae (1995)
- Sennen-Tabito (1999)
- Hotoke (2001)
- Filament (2002)
- Meshita no Koibito (2002)
- Acacia (2008)
- Tokyo Paris Paysage (2010)
- The Unfading Dream (2014)
- Tokyo Decibels (2017)
- The Children of Nakasu (2023)

=== Exhibitions of paintings ===
- 1995: Exhibition "Le Guide d'un monde rouillé" at the Parco Gallery (Tokyo, Japan).
- 2024: Exhibition "Les Invisibles" at the ISETAN Art Gallery (Tokyo, Japan).
- 2024: Exhibition "Porte du temps immobile" at the Shinseido Gallery (Tokyo, Japan).
- 2024: Exhibition "Les Invisibles" at GALERIE 20 THORIGNY (Paris, France).
- 2025: Group exhibition "CHOSIS TA MONTURE" at GALERIE 20 THORIGNY (Paris France).
- 2025: Exhibition "Le Visiteur" at the Mitsukoshi contemporary galerie (Tokyo, Japan).
- 2025: Exhibition "Le Visiteur" at Tenmaya galerie (Okayama, Japan).
- 2025: Exhibition "Le Visiteur" at GALERIE 20 THORIGNY (Paris, France).

=== Collections and Publications of paintings ===
- Several works, including "NEHAN" and "Moment blue," are housed in the Teikyo University Museum.
- Publication of the art catalog "Les Invisibles"
- Publication of the artbook "Vision de Paris, La porte du temps immobile"
- Publication of the artbook "Le Guide d'un monde rouillé"

== Awards ==
=== Novels ===
- 1989 — Subaru Literary Prize (Shueisha), Pianissimo
- 1996 — Akutagawa Prize, The Light on the Strait (Kaikyō no Hikari)
- 1999 — Femina Prize (Prix Femina Étranger), Le Bouddha blanc (The White Buddha, 白仏)

=== Films ===
- 2001 - Hotoke, won best image award in the Competition section at the Deauville Asian Film Festival
- 2002 - Filament (Director, Screenwriter, Music), awarded the International Ecumenical Jury of the Christian Churches in the Official Selection Competition section at the 37th Czech Karlovy Vary International Film Festival
- 2008 - Acacia, presented to the 22nd Tokyo International Film Festival
- 2013 - Paris Tokyo Paysage, awarded the Prix de la meilleure image (best cinematography) at the 7th Festival du cinéma japonais contemporain Kinotayo (2012-2013)

== Sources ==
- Writer information page in his short story collection Mokka no koibito (目下の恋人). Tokyo: Kōbunsha, 2002. ISBN 9784334923532.
