= Stefanie Zweig =

20th and 21st-century German writer

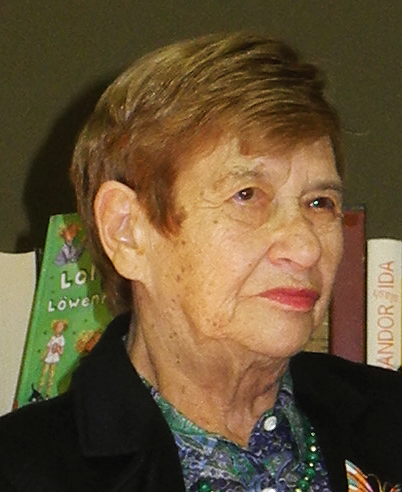
- Zweig in 2012
- Born: 19 September 1932; Leobschütz, Germany
- Died: 25 April 2014 (aged 81); Frankfurt, Germany
- Occupation: Author
- Partner: Wolfgang Häfele
- Writing career
- Language: German
- Notable work: Nowhere in Africa

Stefanie Zweig (19 September 1932 – 25 April 2014) was a German Jewish writer and journalist. She is best known for her autobiographical novel, Nirgendwo in Afrika (Nowhere in Africa) (1995), which was a bestseller in Germany. The novel is based on her early life in Kenya, where her family had fled to escape persecution in Nazi Germany. The film adaptation of the novel (2001) won the Academy Award for Best Foreign Language Film. Her books have sold more than seven million copies, and have been translated into fifteen languages.

== Background and career in journalism ==
Zweig was born in Leobschütz, Germany (now Głubczyce, Poland). She is not related to the Austrian writer, Stefan Zweig [1881-1942]. She and her parents, being Jewish, fled to Africa in 1938 to escape persecution in Nazi Germany. They went from a prosperous urban life in Breslau (now Wrocław) to a poor farm in Kenya; Zweig was five years old. Paul Vitello writes in his obituary that, "The parents endured grinding work and bouts of depression. Stefanie, who had been withdrawn, blossomed into a venturesome, Swahili-speaking teenager." In 1941, the family received a postcard from Zweig's grandmother saying, "We are very excited, we are going to Poland tomorrow". Zweig's father explained that the grandmother was being sent to the Auschwitz concentration camp, which was operated by the German occupiers of Poland. She and many others were murdered there. Zweig attended an English boarding school while in Kenya, which was a British colony at the time. Zweig's father became a British soldier during World War II (1939–1945), when Britain was fighting Germany and the other Axis powers, but in 1947 he took his wife, daughter and infant son back to Germany.

The family's original home had been in Upper Silesia, which was in the east of prewar Germany. After the war, most of the region became part of Poland and the German residents had to move. Zweig's father had been offered a position as a judge in Frankfurt in western Germany. His appointment was part of the "denazification" of the judicial system in postwar Germany; only Germans without connections to the Nazi party could serve as judges. Zweig was enrolled in the Schiller School in Frankfurt. Having become primarily an English speaker in Kenya, she needed to relearn German. She later wrote, "Learning German so that I could read and write and get rid of my English accent took me a couple of months; the assessment as to which is my mother-language is still going on. I count in English, adore Alice in Wonderland, am best friends with Winnie-the-Pooh and I am still hunting for the humour in German jokes."

After her graduation from the Schiller School in 1953, Zweig started a career as a journalist. She worked for a time as an intern and then an editor for the Offenbach section of Abendpost, a tabloid newspaper which served the Frankfurt region. From 1959 to 1988 Zweig worked in Frankfurt for Abendpost and its successor Abendpost/Nachtausgabe [Evening Post/Night Edition]j. She directed the arts section ("Feuilleton") from 1963. Abendpost/Nachtausgabe folded in 1988, after which Zweig became a freelance journalist and writer. Hans Riebsamen wrote in 2012 that "In retrospect, both Zweig and her readership can be happy that Abendpost/Nachtausgabe folded in 1988."

== Literary career ==
While working for Abendpost, Zweig wrote a number of children's books, commencing with Eltern sind auch Menschen [Parents are people too] (1978). Her first novel set in Kenya was the novel for young adults Ein Mundvoll Erde [A Mouthful of Earth] (1980). It describes an infatuation with a Kĩkũyũ boy; the book won several awards, including the Glass Globe of the Royal Dutch Geographical Society.

Zweig explained in an interview that the success of Ein Mundvoll Erde encouraged her to write her first novel for adults. She said, "I thought to myself, 'You really are a fool to waste all your life in a children's book, why don't you tell the true story?'" Nirgendwo in Afrika [Nowhere in Africa] appeared in 1995. Zweig described it simply as "the story of a courageous father who taught his daughter not to hate." The autobiographical novel recounts the Redlich family's life in Kenya from their arrival from Germany in 1938 until their return to Germany in 1947. The book was a bestseller in Germany, and launched a writing career that extended over another dozen novels. Zweig's next novel, Irgendwo in Deutschland [Somewhere in Germany] (1996), is a sequel describing the Redlich family's life in Germany from their return in 1947 until the death of the father from heart failure in 1958.

Zweig subsequently published the "Rothschildallee" series of four novels that appeared from 2007 to 2011; Zweig's family home in Frankfurt had long been on this street. In 2012 she published her memoir, Nirgendwo war Heimat: Mein Leben auf zwei Kontinenten [Nowhere was Home: My Life on Two Continents].

In all Zweig's books have sold over seven million copies and have been translated into fifteen languages. The 2002 film adaptation of Nirgendwo in Afrika was written and directed by Caroline Link. It won the Academy Award for Best Foreign Language Film, the German Film Award for Best Fiction Film, and several other prizes. While the film attracted international attention to Zweig, she was not directly involved in its making. Marlies Comjean has translated two of her novels, which appear in English as Nowhere in Africa and Somewhere in Germany; see the bibliography below. In addition to these books, Zweig had continued her work as a journalist, and up to 2013 was writing a column Meine Welt [My World] for the newspaper Frankfurter Neue Presse.

Zweig died on 25 April 2014 after a short illness. Her partner Wolfgang Häfele predeceased her in 2013. She had chosen to be buried in the Neuer Jüdischer Friedhof [New Jewish Cemetery] in Frankfurt.

== Selected bibliography ==
- Eltern sind auch Menschen [Parents are People Too] (in German). Frankfurt am Main: Fischer. 1978. ISBN 3-439-78103-8.
- Ein Mundvoll Erde [A Mouthful of Earth] (in German). Union-Verlag. 1980. ISBN 3-8139-5356-4. OCLC 38741676. Reissued as Vivian und Ein Mundvoll Erde [Vivian and a Mouthful of Earth] (in German). Langen Müller. 2001. ISBN 3-7844-2842-8. This book consists of the original young adult novel and an autobiographical introduction entitled "Vivian".
- Nirgendwo in Afrika [Nowhere in Africa] (in German). Langen Müller. 1995. ISBN 3-7844-2802-9. OCLC 34308707.
  - See also: Nowhere in Africa. Translated by Marlies Comjean. University of Wisconsin Press. 2004. ISBN 978-0299199609.
- Irgendwo in Deutschland [Somewhere in Germany] (in German). Langen Müller. 1996. ISBN 3-7844-2578-X.
  - See also: Somewhere in Germany. Translated by Marlies Comjean. University of Wisconsin Press/Terrace Books. 2006. ISBN 9780299210106. OCLC 64453419.
- Doch die Träume blieben in Afrika [But the dreams stayed in Africa] (in German). Langen Müller. 1998. ISBN 3-7844-2697-2.
- Karibu heißt willkommen [Karibu means welcome] (in German). Langen Müller. 2000. ISBN 3-7844-2801-0.
- Es begann damals in Afrika [It started at that time in Africa] (in German). Langen Müller. 2004. ISBN 3-7844-2963-7.
- Und das Glück ist anderswo [And Happiness lies Elsewhere] (in German). Langen Müller. 2007. ISBN 978-3-7844-3027-0.
- Nur die Liebe bleibt [Only Love Remains] (in German). Langen Müller. 2006. ISBN 3-7844-3051-1.
- Das Haus in der Rothschildallee [The House on Rothschild Avenue] (in German). Langen Müller. 2007. ISBN 978-3-7844-3103-1.
- Die Kinder der Rothschildallee [The Children of Rothschild Avenue] (in German). Langen Müller. 2009. ISBN 978-3-7844-3158-1.
- Heimkehr in die Rothschildallee [Homecoming to Rothschild Avenue] (in German). Langen Müller. 2010. ISBN 978-3-7844-3240-3.
- Neubeginn in der Rothschildallee [A New Beginning on Rothschild Avenue] (in German). Langen Müller. 2011. ISBN 978-3-7844-3268-7.
- Nirgendwo war Heimat: Mein Leben auf zwei Kontinenten [Nowhere was Home: My Life on two Continents] (in German). Langen Müller. 2012. ISBN 978-3-7844-3310-3.
- Bis die Sonne untergeht [Until the Sun Goes Down] (in German). Langen Müller. 2014. ISBN 978-3784433349.
