= Úvaly =

- Town
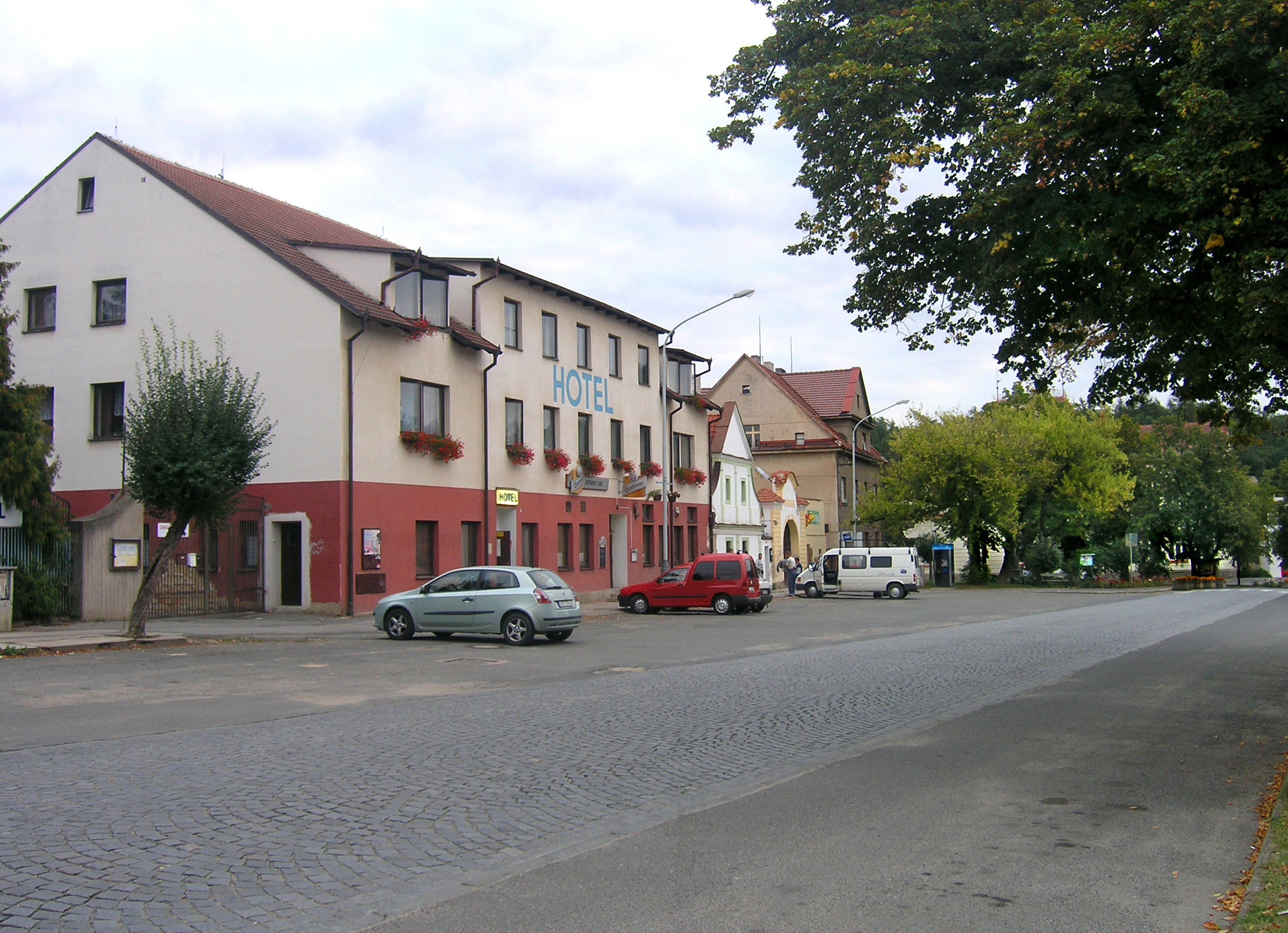
- The square Náměstí Arnošta z Pardubic

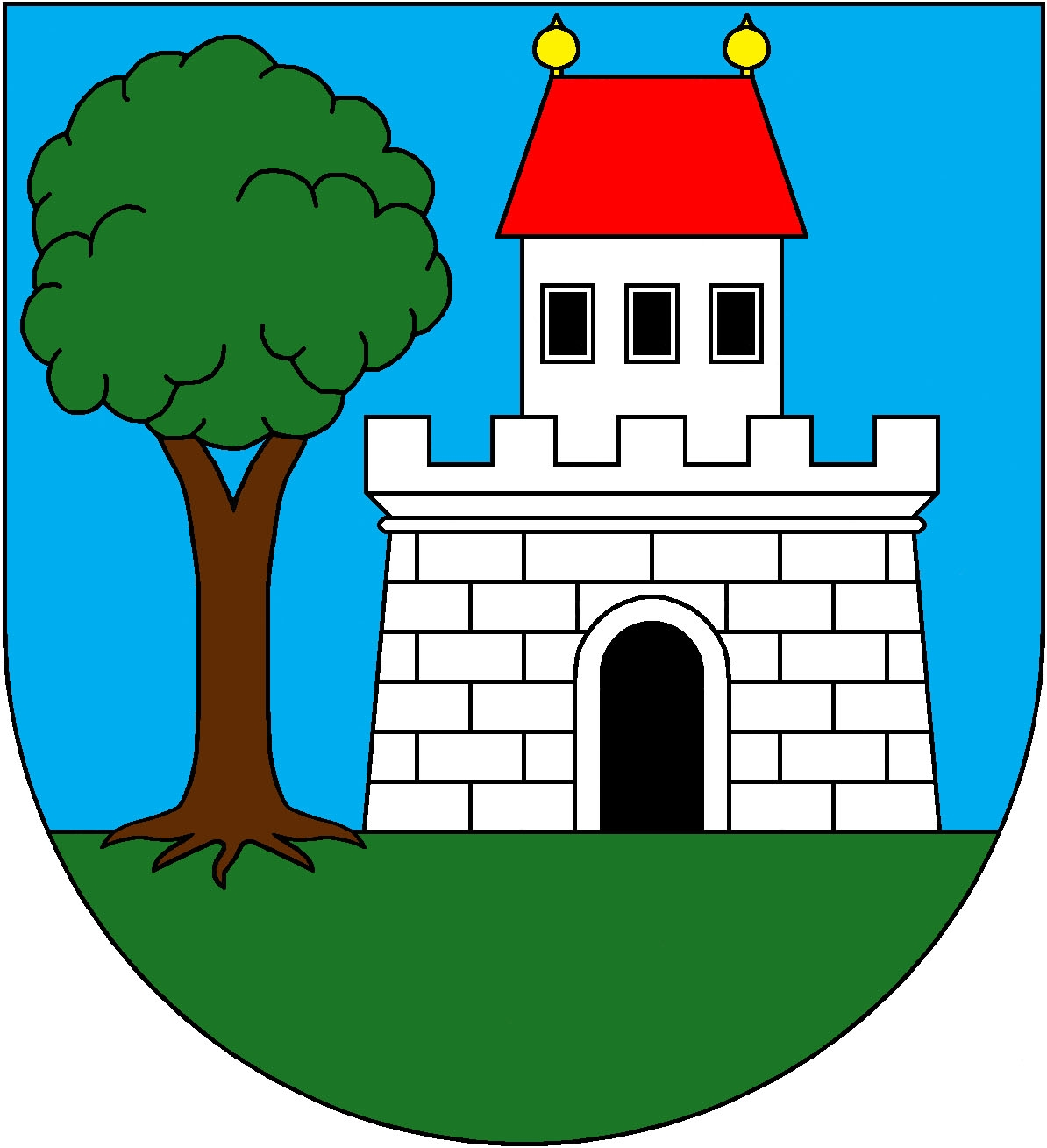
- Flag Coat of arms

- Location in the Czech Republic
- Coordinates: 50°4′25″N 14°43′49″E
- Country: Czech Republic
- Region: Central Bohemian
- District: Prague-East
- First mentioned: 1290

Government
  - Mayor: Markéta Rydvalová

Area
  - Total: 10.97 km^{2} (4.24 sq mi)
- Elevation: 253 m (830 ft)

Population (2026-01-01)
  - Total: 7,507
  - Density: 684.3/km^{2} (1,772/sq mi)
- Time zone: UTC+1 (CET)
  - Summer (DST): UTC+2 (CEST)
- Postal code: 250 82
- Website: www.mestouvaly.cz

Úvaly (Czech pronunciation: [ˈuːvalɪ]; German: Auwal) is a town in Prague-East District in the Central Bohemian Region of the Czech Republic. It has about 7,500 inhabitants. The town is located on the Výmola Stream in the Prague Plateau.

Úvaly was founded in the 13th century at the latest and became a town in 1969.

== Etymology ==
In Czech, the name means 'valleys'. It was originally used in the singular as Úval, but in the 18th century, it was changed to the plural.

== Geography ==
Úvaly is located about 15 kilometres (9 mi) east of the centre of Prague. It lies in the Prague Plateau. The highest point is at 298 m (978 ft) above sea level. The Výmola Stream flows through the town. There are several small fishponds in the municipal territory.

== History ==
The first written mention of Úvaly is from 1290. The settlement lied on the important trade route Prague–Český Brod–Kutná Hora, which helped to its growth. In 1654 it was first mentioned as a market town. In 1845, the railway Prague–Olomouc via Úvaly was built, and the population of Úvaly grew up from hundreds to thousands. In 1969, Úvaly became a town.

== Demographics ==
Historical population

Year	Pop.	±%
1869	818	—
1880	981	+19.9%
1890	1,130	+15.2%
1900	1,292	+14.3%
1910	1,820	+40.9%

Year	Pop.	±%
1921	2,332	+28.1%
1930	4,346	+86.4%
1950	4,693	+8.0%
1961	4,999	+6.5%
1970	4,892	−2.1%

Year	Pop.	±%
1980	4,893	+0.0%
1991	4,604	−5.9%
2001	4,690	+1.9%
2011	6,112	+30.3%
2021	7,166	+17.2%

Source: Censuses

== Transport ==
The I/12 road from Prague to Kolín runs through the town.

Úvaly is located on the railway line Prague–Kolín. It is served by three Esko Prague lines: Praha hlavní nádraží–Úvaly, Praha Masarykovo nádraží–Kolín and Praha Masarykovo nádraží–Kutná Hora.

== Sights ==
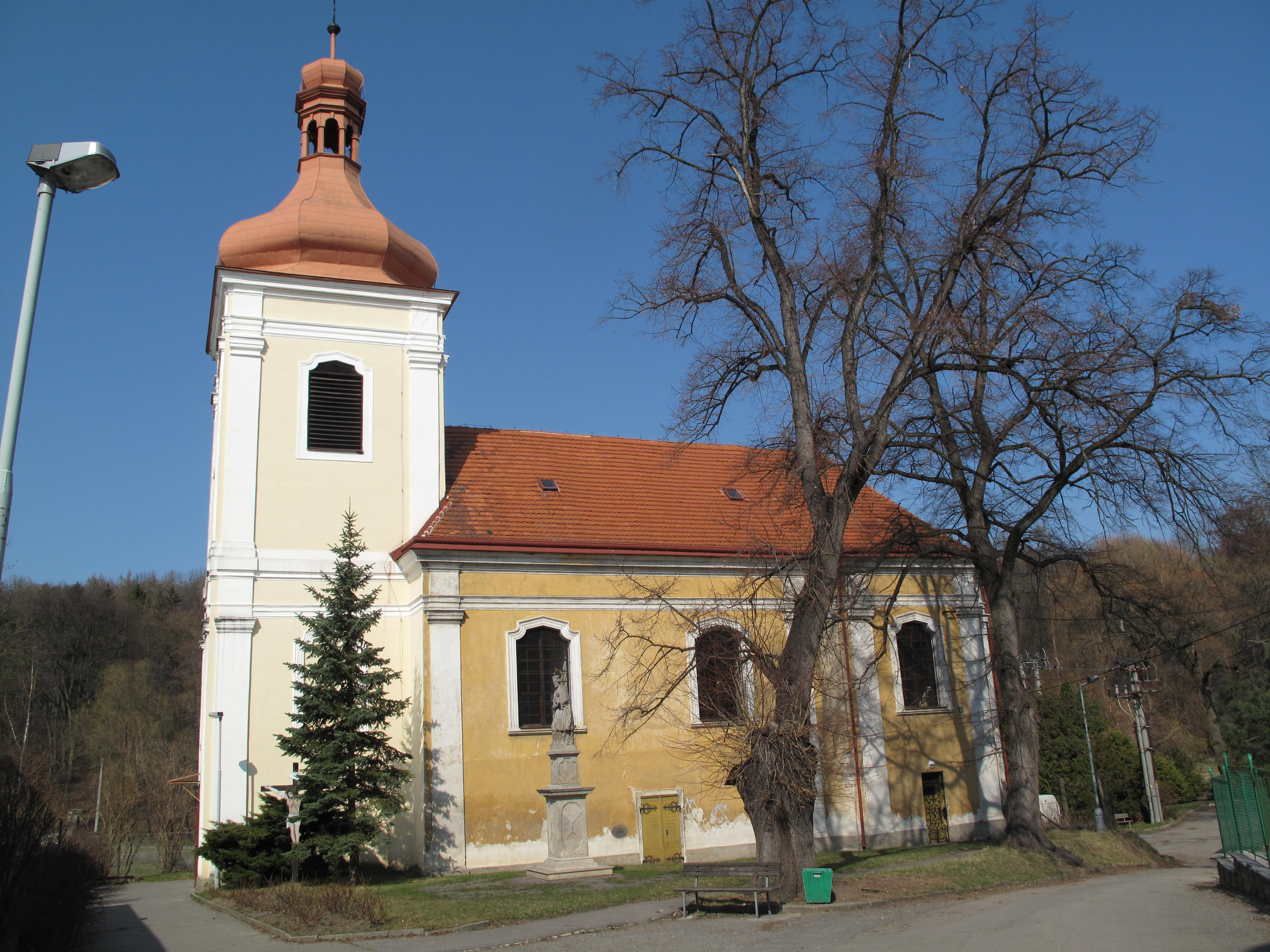
Church of the Annunciation of the Virgin Mary

The main landmark is the Church of the Annunciation of the Virgin Mary. It was built on the site of a chapel founded in 1342.

A valuable technical monument is the Úvaly Railway Bridge. It was built in 1844–1845 and was part of the first steam railway in Bohemia, which connected Prague and Olomouc in 1842–1845.

East pole of Prague is located on the border between Prague and Úvaly.

== Notable people ==
- Marie Majerová (1882–1967), writer, translator and journalist
- Vladimír Kejř (1929–1981), gymnast
- Oldřich Hamera (1944–2021), graphic artist

Music group Divokej Bill was founded here.
