= Year of the Devil =

2002 Czech mockumentary film

- Directed by: Petr Zelenka
- Written by: Petr Zelenka
- Produced by: Pavel Strnad
- Starring: Jaromír Nohavica, Karel Plíhal, František Černý, Karel Holas & Čechomor, Jaz Coleman, Jan Prent
- Edited by: David Charap
- Music by: Jaromír Nohavica, Čechomor, Karel Holas
- Production company: Negativ
- Release date: 7 March 2002
- Running time: 88 minutes
- Country: Czech Republic
- Languages: Czech; English; Dutch

Year of the Devil (Czech: Rok ďábla) is a 2002 Czech mockumentary film directed by Petr Zelenka. It stars musicians who act as themselves: Czech folk music band Čechomor, musicians and poets Jaromír Nohavica, Karel Plihal and British musician and composer Jaz Coleman. The soundtrack also includes two pieces by the Killing Joke: Frenzy and Exorcism.

== Plot ==
Dutch documentary film director, Jan Holman, goes to the Czech Republic to make a film about curing alcoholism. At an Alcoholics Anonymous meeting he finds a man named Jaromir Nohavica who becomes his friend. Another friend of Nohavica, Karel Plihal, becomes mute, and Nohavica decides to start a tour with the band Čechomor to help cure him. When Jan Holman follows with his camera in tow, he finds many inexplicable events along the way.

== Awards and nominations ==
It was awarded the Crystal Globe at the 37th Karlovy Vary International Film Festival, and won the Findling Award and the FIPRESCI Prize at the Cottbus Film Festival of Young East European Cinema in 2002. In 2003 it won 6 Czech Lions, including Best Film, Best Director, Best Editing, and was nominated for 5 more, including Best Screenplay and Best Cinematography. In the same year it won the Prize Trieste at the Trieste Film Festival.
