= Ivory Hunters =

- Screenplay by: Richard Guttman; Bill Bozzone
- Story by: Bradley T. Winter
- Directed by: Joseph Sargent
- Starring: John Lithgow; Isabella Rossellini; James Earl Jones; Tony Todd; Olek Krupa
- Theme music composer: Charles Bernstein
- Country of origin: United States
- Original language: English

Production
- Executive producer: Christopher N. Palmer
- Producer: Robert Halmi
- Cinematography: Kees Van Oostrum
- Editor: Debra Karen
- Running time: 94 minutes
- Production companies: National Audubon Society; Turner Pictures; Rhi Entertainment, Inc; Quntex Entertainment, Inc

Original release
- Network: TNT
- Release: August 20, 1990

Ivory Hunters (also titled The Last Elephant) is a 1990 television film directed by Joseph Sargent and starring John Lithgow, Isabella Rossellini and James Earl Jones.

== Cast ==
- John Lithgow as Robert Carter
- Isabella Rossellini as Maria DiConti
- James Earl Jones as Inspector Nkuru
- Tony Todd as Jomo
- Olek Krupa as Philippe Pell
- Oliver Litondo as Kenneth
- Sidede Onyulo as Sirwa
