= Sidede Onyulo =

Kenyan actor (1955–2008)

- Born: Peter Sidede Onyulo; 1955
- Died: 2008 (aged 52–53)
- Education: Nairobi University
- Occupation: actor
- Years active: 1995–2008
- Notable work: Nowhere in Africa

Sidede Onyulo (1955–2008) was a Kenyan actor, most famous for his role as Owour in Oscar-winning movie Nowhere in Africa.

== Early life ==
Sidede Onyulo was born Peter Sidede Onyulo in Kajulu (Kenya), attended school at Muthaiga Primary (1965–1968) and at Nairobi School (1969–1976) before enrolling at the University of Nairobi where he studied law between 1975 and 1978. In 1979, Onyulo quit his law practice and decided to embrace theatre, a decision that was denounced by his friends and his family.

Onyulo explained in an interview why acting had such a small number of fans in Kenya: "They think this is a career that should not be taken seriously and look down upon actors. They think we are mad the way the people of Kafira thought Jasper Wendo was in Betrayal of the city."

== Theatre and film ==
He made his acting debut with Jero in Wole Soyinka's play Trials of Brother Jero. He followed this with various roles in Micere Githae Mugo and Ngũgĩ wa Thiong'o’s Trial of Dedan Kimathi and Francis Imbuga’s Betrayal in the City which were also presented at All Africa Festival of Arts and Culture (FESTAC) in Nigeria in 1977.

Onyulo made his film debut in 1987 when he received the role of a house boy in Shadow on the Sun. It is said that Kenyan film experts recommended him at a very early stage for the role of Owour, in Nowhere in Africa, but he could not be found, having moved away from Nairobi to Kisumu, in the Western part of Kenya. A local casting agent tracked him down to his home village near Lake Victoria and offered him the role that brought him fame at an international level. He was said to be a modest man, unaware that he had won the Best Supporting Actor award in the Dublin Film Festival for his role as Owour. Film producer Peter Herrman later presented the award to him.

He has been in several major film productions, including Ivory Hunters (aka "The Last Elephant") (1990), Eyes of a Witness (1991), Nowhere in Africa (2003), King Solomon's Mines (2004), and The Constant Gardener (2005).

== Other work ==
Onyulo was actively involved in grass-roots organizing of the film industry in Kenya, working with various performing arts groups. He also worked with non-governmental organizations, lending his talent to the anti-female-genital-mutilation Swahili documentary Price of a Daughter.

== Death ==
Onyulo fell sick while at his rural home at the foot of Kajulu hills and was rushed to a private hospital and died a week later.
