= Čechomor =

Czech rock band

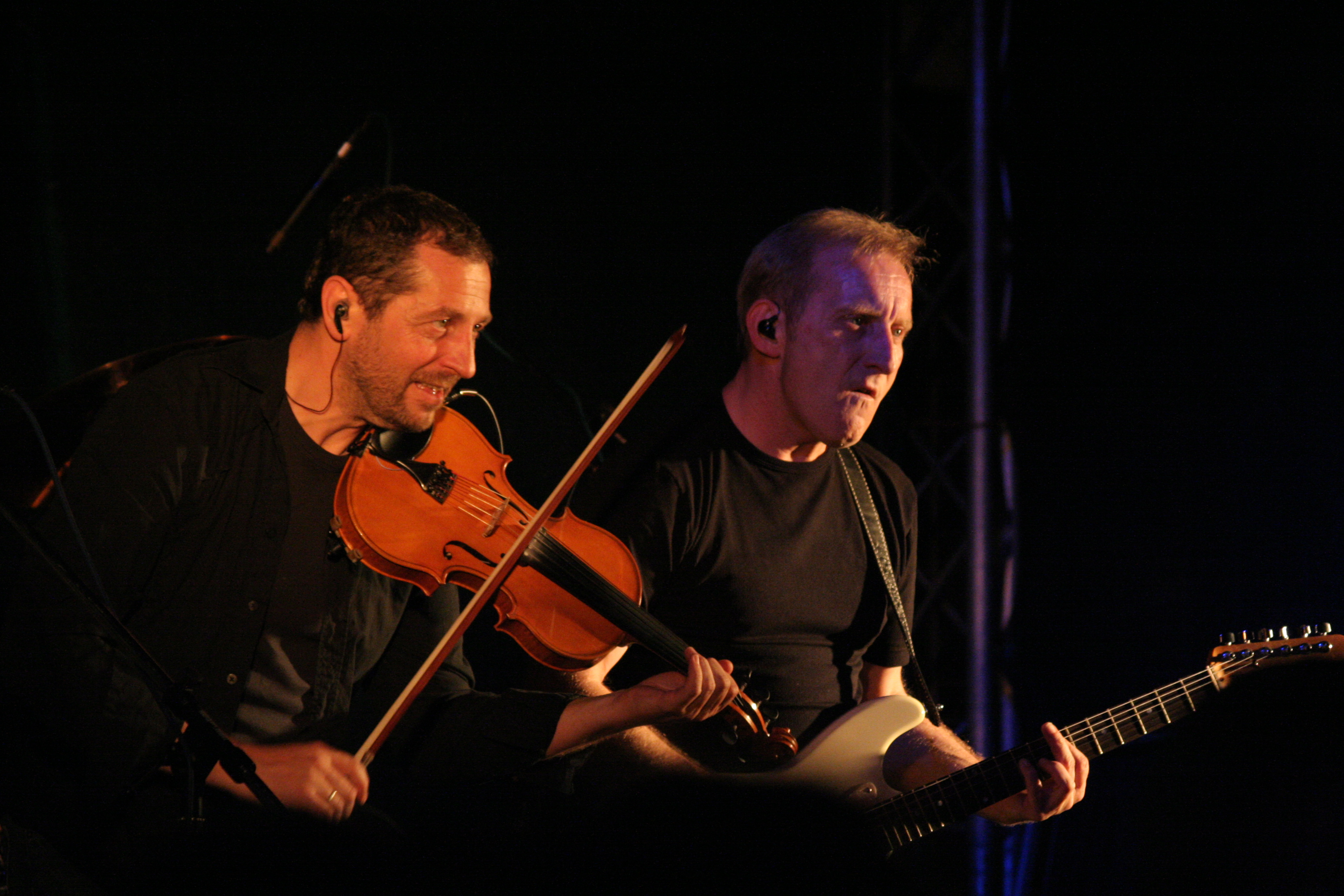
- Karel Holas and František Černý, 2006

Background information
- Also known as: Českomoravská Hudební Společnost
- Origin: Svitavy, Czechoslovakia
- Genres: Folk; folk rock
- Years active: 1988–present
- Labels: Globus Internacional; Venkow; Universal
- Members: Karel Holas; František Černý; Matěj Lienert; Lukáš Čunta; Martina Pártlová
- Past members: Radek Pobořil; Jiří Břenek; Jiří Michálek; Antonín Svoboda; Roman Lomtadze; Radek Klučka; Martin Vajgl; Michal Pavlík; Martin Rychta; Patrik Sas; Lukáš Pavlík; Adam Malík
- Website: cechomor.cz

Čechomor is a Czech band from Svitavy that performs traditional songs in rock arrangements. They have toured throughout Europe, North America, Russia, China, Mongolia, and Australia and were reportedly a favourite band of Czech playwright and former president Václav Havel. In 2001, they won three Anděl Awards.

== History ==
=== Formation and first release: 1988–94 ===
Čechomor was founded in the west Moravian town of Svitavy in the spring of 1988 under the name I. Českomoravská nezávislá hudební společnost (1. Czech-Moravian Independent Music Society). The band's original lineup consisted of Jiří Břenek (violin, vocals), František Černý (guitar, vocals), Jiří Michálek (accordion), and Antonín Svoboda (violin). They released their first album, Dověcnosti, in 1991, under their original name. After the release of the album, they were joined by Radek Pobořil (accordion, trumpet).

=== Change in sound, new members: 1994–99 ===
Around 1994, Čechomor began to move away from a purely acoustic sound and began using more electric instruments. They were joined by new musicians Martin Rychta (drums), Michal Pavlík (cello, bagpipes), and Karel Holas (violin) and they abbreviated their name to Českomoravská hudební společnost. They released their next album, Mezi horami, under this name, in 1996. The same year, founding member Jiří Břeněk died of cancer. At this point, the ensemble consisted of Černý, Holas, Pobořil, Pavlík, and Rychta. In 1999, the band went on tour with fellow Czech rockers Lucie, opening for them on their Větší, Než Malé Množství Lásky tour.

=== New name, new recordings, film, and live album: 2000–02 ===
In 2000, the group released the album Čechomor, from which they took their present name. David Koller from Lucie appeared as a guest drummer on the record, and Lenka Dusilová sang guest vocals. Later that year, the band went on tour with Jaromír Nohavica. Radek Klučka joined Čechomor on drums, replacing Martin Rychta.

In 2001, a concert was held at Rudolfinum, where Čechomor played with the Collegium of the Czech Philharmonic Orchestra. The performance was arranged by well-known English composer and producer Jaz Coleman. The band went on to record their next album, Proměny, with Coleman on production duties. The album also included the participation of the Collegium. Čechomor won three Anděl Awards for the record—Group of the Year, Album of the Year, and Song of the Year. Around this time, playwright and director Petr Zelenka approached the band about making a film. The project, titled Year of the Devil, again included the input of Coleman, as well as Nohavica. The film, a mockumentary, was released the following year and won a Czech Lion Award for Best Music. Also in 2002, the group released their first live album, Čechomor Live.

=== Tours, compilation, new album: 2003–08 ===
The Proměny tour 2003 live album followed in 2003, winning Čechomor another Anděl, this one for DVD of the Year. In 2004, Roman Lomtadze replaced drummer Radek Klučka. That year, Čechomor released the compilation Čechomor 1991–1996 and a year later, another studio album, Co sa stalo nové, which for the first time was composed of all original tracks. The album featured Lenka Dusilová as well as two participants of the Womad Prague 2000 festival, Irish singer Iarla Ó Lionáird and Japanese taiko drummer and shakuhachi flautist Joji Hirota.

Also in 2005, Holas, Pobořil, and Pavlík, together with a variety of other musicians, contributed to the album Lemele by Israeli musician Chava Alberstein.

In 2006, Čechomor released the live album Stalo sa živě. In 2007, the band released the holiday album Sváteční Čechomor. In 2008, Čechomor participated in a joint tour with Divokej Bill, the 10:20 Connection Tour, which celebrated 10 years of Divokej Bill's existence and 20 for Čechomor.

=== Pověsti trilogy, touring, and Christmas concert: 2008–10 ===
Between 2008 and 2009, Čechomor released a trilogy of concept albums about castles, divided according to their origin—Czech, Moravian, and Silesian. These albums combined song with spoken word, narrated by celebrities including Barbora Hrzánová and Ewa Farna.

2009 saw the band working on a new album while also touring nationally and internationally. In 2010, they organized a Christmas concert tour, with Ewa Farna as guest performer.

=== Místečko, new lineups: 2011–18 ===
In 2011, the new album Místečko was released. World-famous musicians again appeared as guests on the record, such as guitarist Gerry Leonard, best known for his work with David Bowie and later with Suzanne Vega; bassist Tony Levin; and Slovak musician Ivan Tásler. The re-issue of the album actually featured guest vocals by Suzanne Vega on the folk song "Ej z hory dolů", sung in English and titled "Rain Is Falling". In 2012, Čechomor accompanied Vega on her tour of the Czech Republic.

In 2015, a new drummer, Lukáš Pavlík, was introduced, replacing Patrik Sas. Pavlík had previously played with Ewa Farna, Kamil Střihavka, and Aleš Brichta, among others. The same year, the band released the Christmas album Svátečnější.

Michal Pavlík left the band in 2018 and was replaced by musicians Adam Malík (electric guitar, clarinet) and Lukáš Čunta (bass guitar). Martina Pártlová also joined on vocals.

In 2018, Lukáš Pavlík left and was replaced by Matěj Lienert. On their 30th anniversary, Čechomor released the albums Nadechnutí and Nadechnutí jinak.

Čechomor founding member Jiří Michálek died in 2019.

=== COVID-19 pandemic, new album: 2020–present ===
During the 2020 COVID-19 pandemic, the band released their latest album, Radosti života.

In August 2021, Čechomor member Radek Pobořil died after a serious illness.

== Band members ==
Current members

- František Černý – guitar, vocals
- Karel Holas – violin
- Lukáš Čunta – bass
- Martina Pártlová – vocals
- Matěj Lienert – drums

Past members

- Radek Pobořil († 2021) – accordion, trumpet
- Jiří Břenek – violin, vocals
- Jiří Michálek († 2019) – accordion
- Antonín Svoboda – violin
- Michal Pavlík – cello, bagpipes
- Martin Rychta – drums
- Radek Klučka – drums
- Roman Lomtadze – drums
- Patrik Sas – drums
- Lukáš Pavlík – drums
- Adam Malík – electric guitar, clarinet
- Martin Vajgl – drums

== Discography ==
Studio albums

- Dověcnosti (1991)
- Mezi horami (1996)
- Čechomor (2000)
- Proměny (2001)
- Co sa stalo nové (2005)
- Místečko (2011)
- Nadechnutí (2018)
- Nadechnutí jinak (2018)
- Nadechnutí Komplet (box set - 2020)
- Radosti života (2020)

Concept albums

- Pověsti moravských hradů a zámků (2008)
- Pověsti českých hradů a zámků (2009)
- Pověsti slezských hradů a zámků (2009)
- Písně z hradů a zámků (Pověsti trilogy omnibus - 2010)
- Pověsti moravských, českých a slezských hradů (Komplet) - (box set - 2010)

Christmas albums

- Sváteční Čechomor (2007)
- Svátečnější (2015)

Soundtracks

- Rok ďábla (2002)

Live albums

- Čechomor Live (2002)
- Proměny tour 2003 (2003)
- Stalo sa živě (2006)
- Čechomor v Národním (2011)
- Čechomor 25 - Český Krumlov live (2013)
- Nadechnutí živě (2019)

Compilations

- Čechomor 1991–1996 (2004)
- To nejlepší (2005)

Karel Holas / Karel Holas & Čechomor

- Příběhy obyčejného šílenství (2005)
- Summer Love soundtrack (2006)
- Svatba na bitevním poli (2008)
- Franta - Šest křížků (2017)
