= Divokej Bill =

Czech folk rock band

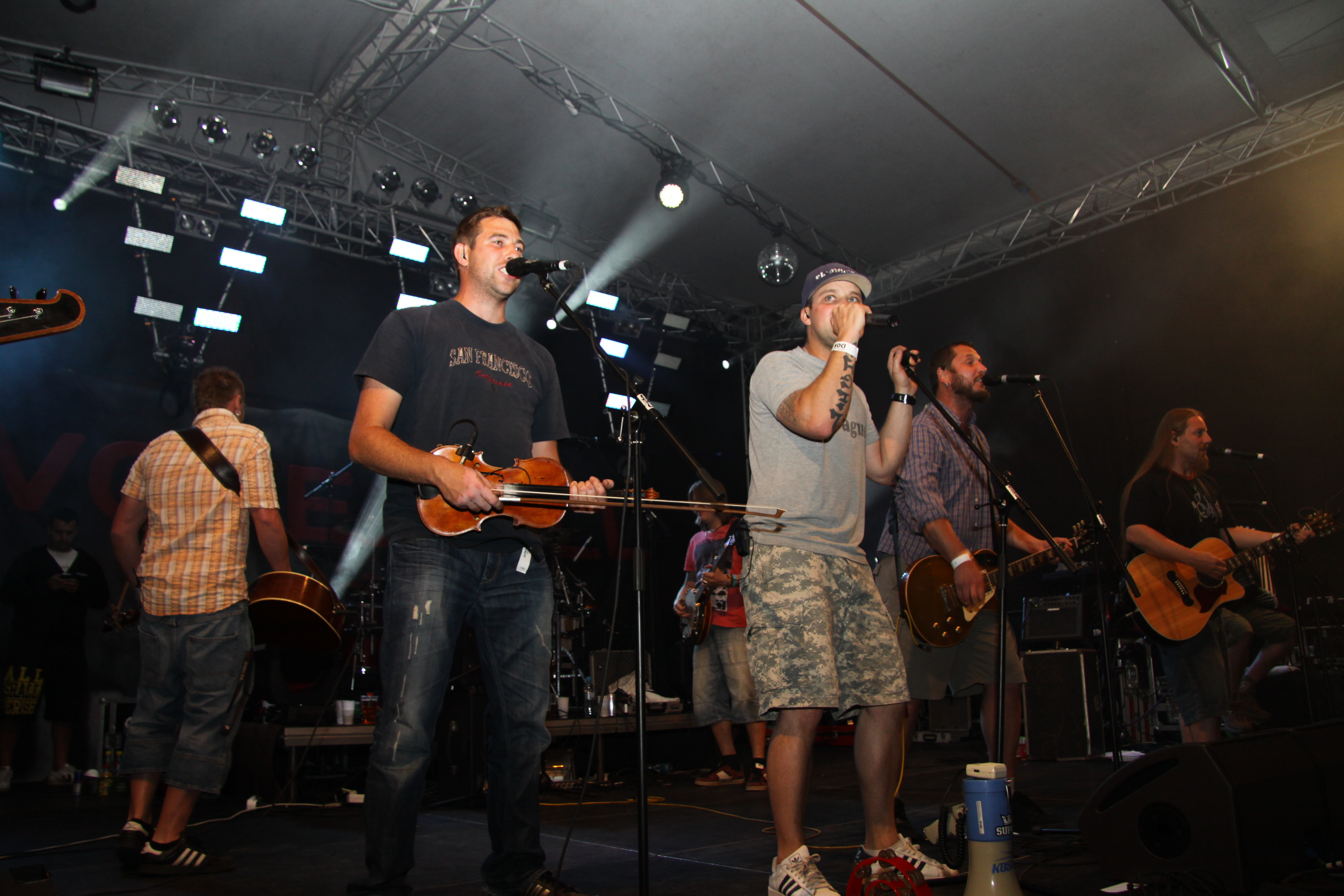
- Divokej Bill in 2011

Background information
- Origin: Úvaly, Czech Republic
- Genres: Folk rock; punk rock; alternative
- Years active: 1998–present
- Members: Štěpán Karbulka; Václav Bláha; Roman Procházka; Jurda Čaruj; Marek Žežulka; Adam Karlík; Honza Bártl; Martin Pecka
- Past members: Miloš Jurač; Ondřej Pospíšil; Ota Smrkovský; Honza Veselý; Lukáš Toman
- Website: divokejbill.cz

Divokej Bill is a Czech folk rock band formed in 1998 in Úvaly, near Prague. The band takes its name from Wild Bill Hickok, and blend country music influences with punk rock, folk, and alternative rock sounds. Divokej Bill is currently composed of vocalist Štěpán Karbulka, guitarist Václav "Venda" Bláha, acoustic guitarist Roman Procházka, bassist Jurda "Šolim" Čaruj, drummer Marek Žežulka, violinist Adam Karlík, banjo and harmonica player Honza "Jack" Bártl, and accordion player Martin "Pecan" Pecka. As of 2021, they have released seven studio albums, four live albums, and two compilations.

== History ==
=== Early years, first two albums: 1998–2001 ===
Divokej Bill was founded on 6 June 1998 in Úvaly by former members of the bands Wáša and Medvěd 009, Václav Bláha (guitar, vocals), Ondřej Pospíšil (banjo, vocals), Miloš Jurač (bass, vocals), and Ota Smrkovský (drums). However, a year later, Pospíšil and Smrkovský left the group and Divokej Bill began looking for new musicians. They were soon joined by Roman Procházka (acoustic guitar, vocals), Štěpán Karbulka (vocals), Adam Karlík (violin, vocals), Martin Pecka (accordion), and Honza Veselý (drums). They recorded their first demo the same year, titled Sedm statečných (The Magnificent Seven), as the band consisted of seven members at the time. They began to play shows, including at Rock for People during the first few years of the festival's existence. The band's original stringed instrument was the banjo, but since the departure of Pospíšil, this element was missing. They eventually added Honza "Jack" Bártl, who played banjo and harmonica.

Divokej Bill recorded another demo, Osm statečných (The Magnificent Eight), in 1999, with which they entered several competitions such as Rock Nymburk, Jim Beam Rock, Broumovská Kytara, and Rock Fest Dobříš, where they usually placed in the top three spots.

Their first album was released in 2000 under the title Propustka do pekel. Divokej Bill began playing club dates, opening for various established bands such as Tři sestry, and gaining some prominence. Their second album, titled Svatá pravda, came out in 2001 and brought them the opportunity to play the Staropramen Tour with Žlutý pes. Following this, Veselý left the group and was replaced by veteran drummer Marek Žežulka, who had previously played with Arakain and Daniel Landa, among others.

=== Radio play, Gold record, further albums: 2003–04 ===
On their third album, Mezi nima (2003), Divokej Bill experimented with synthesizers. The lead single, "Znamení", got them on the radio for the first time. Mezi nima was certified Gold for ten thousand units sold. A year later, they managed to release a successful live album together with a DVD named after the place where it was recorded, Prague's Lucerna.

=== Divokej Bill, Český slavík, 10:20 Connection Tour: 2006–08 ===
In 2006, Divokej Bill released their fourth album, Divokej Bill, and won a Český slavík award for Best Group. A year later, they followed up with the live recording Rock for People. In 2008, they participated in a joint tour with Čechomor, the 10:20 Connection Tour, which celebrated 10 years of Divokej Bill's existence and 20 for Čechomor.

=== More releases, 20th anniversary: 2009–present ===
In 2009, Divokej bill released the album Mlsná. In 2011, their first compilation record, Unisono best of 2000–2010, came out, followed two years later by another album, 15, which referenced the band's 15 years of activity. Two more live albums followed, G2 Acoustic Stage (2014) and Doma (Úvaly 2015 - live) (2016), and the group's latest studio album, Tsunami, was issued in 2017.

On 24 January 2019, Divokej Bill performed their largest concert to date at Prague's O2 Arena, which was completely sold out, as a celebration of the 20th anniversary of their founding.

== Band members ==
Current

- Štěpán Karbulka – vocals
- Václav "Venda" Bláha – vocals, guitar
- Roman Procházka – acoustic guitar, vocals
- Jurda "Šolim" Čaruj – bass
- Marek Žežulka – drums and percussion
- Adam Karlík – violin
- Honza "Jack" Bártl – banjo, harmonica
- Martin "Pecan" Pecka – accordion

Past

- Miloš Jurač – bass guitar, vocals
- Ondřej Pospíšil – banjo (1997–1998)
- Ota Smrkovský – drums (1997–1998)
- Honza "Kiska" Veselý – drums (1998–2003)
- Lukáš Toman – didgeridoo

== Discography ==
Studio albums

- Propustka do pekel (2000)
- Svatá pravda (2001)
- Mezi nima (2003)
- Divokej Bill (2006)
- Mlsná (2009)
- 15 (2013)
- Tsunami (2017)

Live albums

- Lucerna live (CD+DVD) (2004)
- Rock for People (2007)
- G2 Acoustic Stage (CD+DVD) (2014)
- Doma (Úvaly 2015 - live) (2016)

Compilations

- Unisono best of 2000–2010 (2011)
- Platinum Collection (3CD) (2015)

Demos

- Sedm statečných (1998)
- Osm statečných (1999)
