= Caroline Link =

German film director and screenwriter

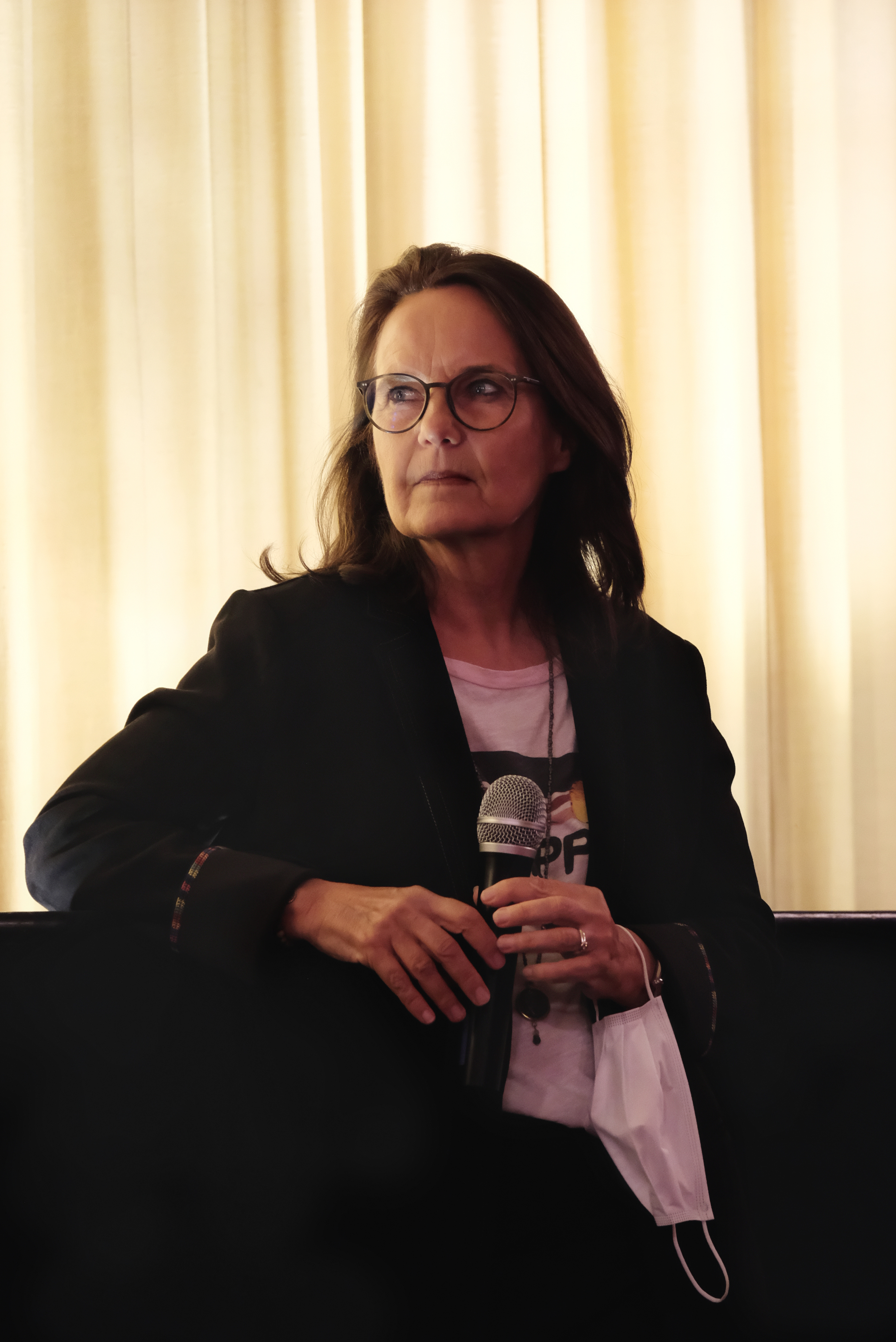
- Link (2020)
- Born: 2 June 1964 (age 62); Bad Nauheim, West Germany
- Occupations: Film director Screenwriter

Caroline Link (born 2 June 1964) is a German television and film director and screenwriter.

She is best known for directing critically acclaimed Beyond Silence, which was nominated for an Academy Award for Best International Feature Film, and for directing Nowhere in Africa, which won an Academy Award for Best International Feature Film and was nominated for a Golden Globe Award.

== Life and work ==
Caroline Link is the daughter of Jürgen and Ilse Link. From 1986 to 1990 she studied at the University of Television and Film Munich (HFF), and then worked as an assistant director and scriptwriter.

Link's early work includes the short film Bunte Blumen, from 1988. She was a co-director on the documentary film Das Glück zum Anfassen (1989). For Bavaria Film, she wrote two screenplays to the detective series Der Fahnder (The Investigators).

Caroline Link grew up in a small town near Frankfurt, Germany, where her "non intellectual and non artistic family" gave her a strong moral compass. Link first became interested in pursuing filmmaking after being a nanny in America. When she came back to Germany, she worked on sets as an extra and sought advice from a cameraman. She thought it would be an interesting profession, recognizing that being a camerawoman was going to be hard. Her observations while working as an extra helped her get an internship in the film industry. Link enjoyed working in the film industry but wanted the ability to create and express her politics.

Link's first feature film, Jenseits der Stille (Beyond Silence, 1996) was nominated for the Academy Award as Best Foreign Language Film, and attracted attention for its portrayal of a family with deaf parents. Her second feature film was Annaluise and Anton (1999), based on a novel by Erich Kästner. Her third feature film, Nirgendwo in Afrika (Nowhere in Africa, 2001), adapted by Link from the autobiographical novel by Stefanie Zweig and shot on location in Kenya, received the Academy Award for Best Foreign Language Film as well winning the German Film Award (Deutscher Filmpreis) in five categories, including Best Fiction Film.

=== Beyond Silence ===
In 1996, Link made her breakthrough with the film Beyond Silence, which was nominated for the Oscar for Best Foreign Language Film. She used the theme of silence in her story as an allegory for censorship, generational trauma and oppression in the heart of Germany society. "This isn’t really a movie about deafness, Beyond Silence. It’s about deafness on the surface, of course, but the emotional substance is about communication in a family. I always try to speak about a universal emotion that most viewers will know and understand. So with Beyond Silence, I knew I wanted to make a movie about a father and a daughter – a daughter who loves her father very much but who feels drawn to a completely different world. This I knew from my own life, and this is what I wanted to write about before I knew I’d make a movie about a deaf family."

“Women tend to worry a lot about their perception. We want to be nice people. But it’s not always possible to be calm, sweet and understanding when you are in a leading position or if you really try to get something that you need for your creative idea. I had to learn that it is ok for a woman to want something, to be the boss and to sometimes even be aggressive”.

== Personal life ==
Link lives with her partner, the film director Dominik Graf, and their daughter, who was born in 2002.

== Filmography ==
=== Films ===
Year	Title	Role	Notes
1988	Bunte Blumen		
1989	Glück zum Anfassen		
1990	Sommertage		
1996	Beyond Silence	Director	
1999	Annaluise & Anton	Director	
2001	Nowhere in Africa	Director	
2008	A Year Ago in Winter	Director	
2013	Exit Marrakech	Director	
2018	All About Me	Director	
2019	When Hitler Stole Pink Rabbit	Director	

=== Television ===
Year	Title	Role	Notes
1985	Der Fahnder		
1992	Kalle der Träumer		

== Awards and nominations ==
Year	Award	Category	Work	Result	Notes
2019	German Film Award	Most Popular German Film Of The Year	All About Me	Won	
2003	Golden Globe Awards	Best Foreign Language Film	Nowhere in Africa	Nominated	
2002	Academy Awards	Best International Feature Film	Nowhere in Africa	Won	
1998	Bavarian Film Award	Best Young People's Film		Won	
1997	Academy Awards	Best International Feature Film	Beyond Silence	Nominated	
1997	Tokyo Sakura Grand Prix			Won	
1996	Bavarian Film Award	Best New Director		Won	
