= Kaoru Ikeya (director) =

Japanese film director

Kaoru Ikeya (池谷薫, Ikeya Kaoru) (born 14 October 1958) is a Japanese documentary film director. He directed the documentary The Ants (2006). His work addresses the topics of war and Japanese military history. His film Runta (2015) deals with the political situation in Tibet. while Senzo Ni Naru (2013), about the aftermath of March, 11 2011 earthquake, was screened at the Berlin Festival.

== Filmography ==
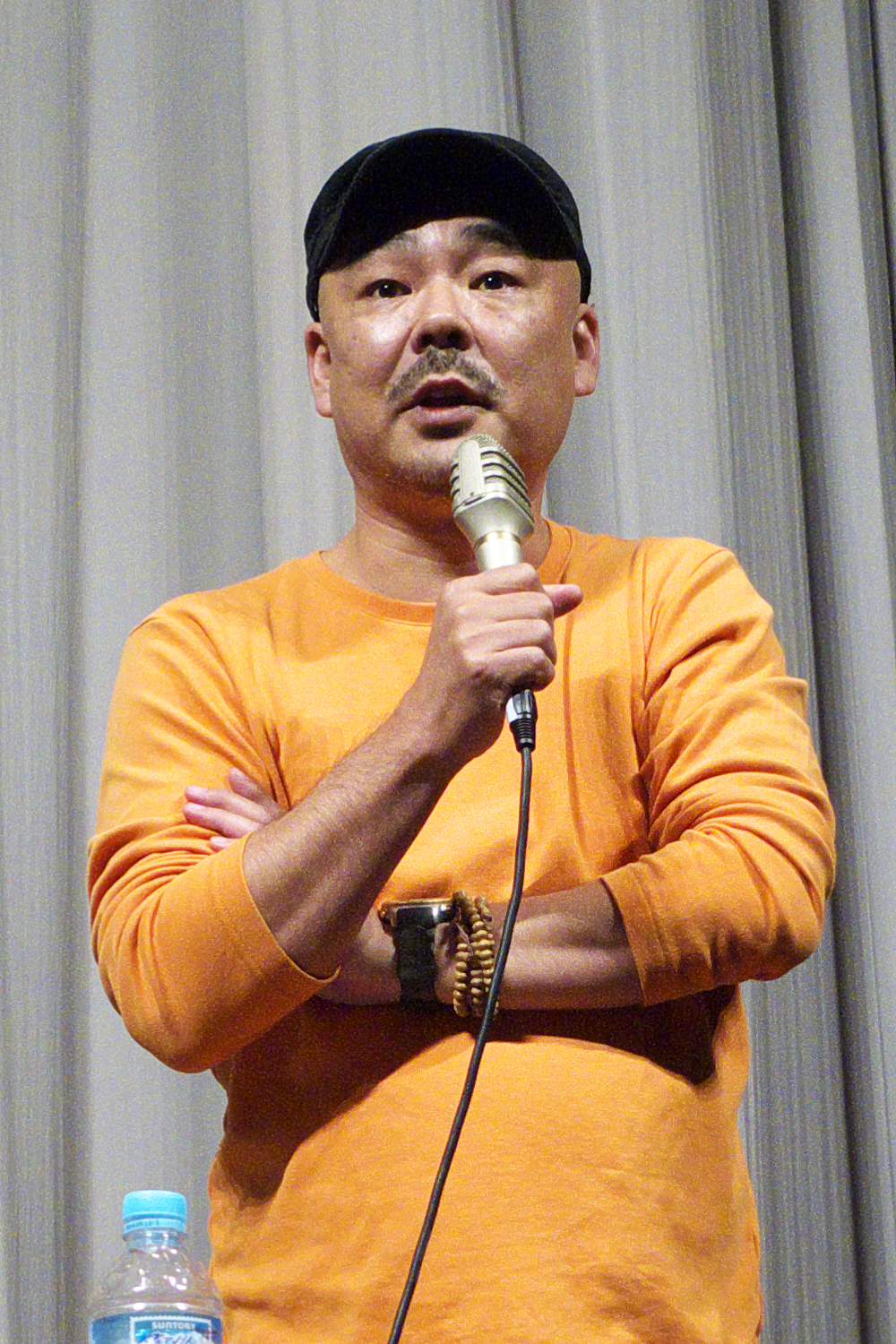

== Reception ==
"Director Ikeya Kaoru covers (the) controversial territory (of Japan's military past) from a deeply human perspective, that of 80-year-old veteran Mr. Okumura, who once fought beside fellow Imperial soldiers in China, and who is now confronting the spectre of his war crimes. In a passionate campaign, Okumura joins with fellow veterans to expose the secret military orders that kept his company in China years after Japan had ostensibly surrendered. His macabre journey takes him from Japan’s Yasukuni shrine, where he pities youth celebrating the monument "in ignorance", back to China, where he tries to come to terms, face-to-face, with victims of the atrocities. Ants is a sweeping documentary that vividly and articulately relates the present to the past, and the personal to the political. Kaoru's direction and Okumura's project become fused in meaning, and together they weave a crucial historical filament that is binding and also damning." Brett Hendrie.
