= Törr =

Czech metal band

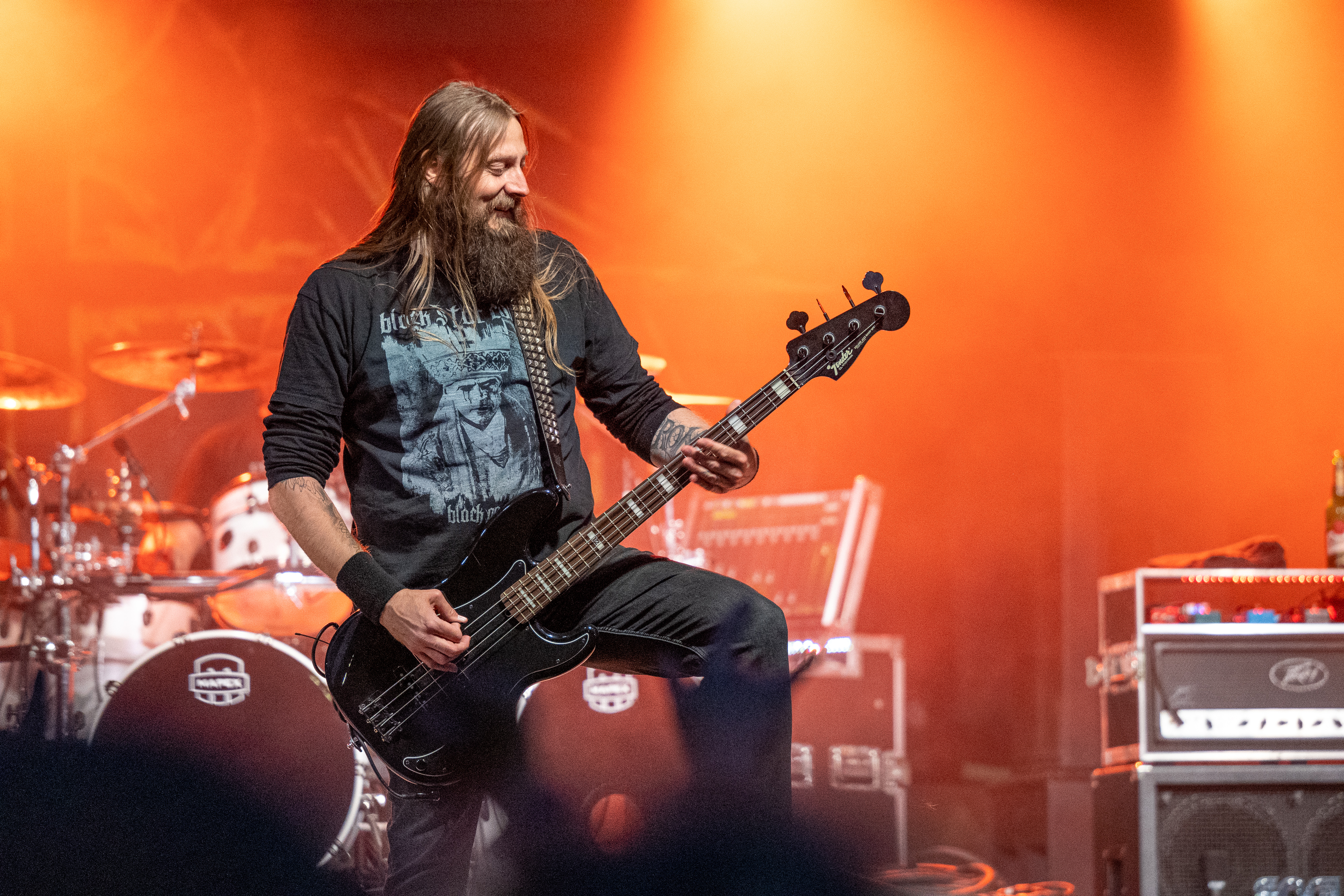
- Jan Bartoš performing with Törr in 2023

Background information
- Origin: Prague, Czechoslovakia
- Genres: Thrash metal; black metal; heavy metal
- Years active: 1977–present
- Members: Ota Hereš; Radek Sladký; Jan Bartoš
- Past members: Pavel Kadeřábek; Filip Moldan; Michael Jakubův; Jiří Podzimek; David Strnad; Miroslav Mach; Jiří Sochan; Bogan Chadt; Jiří Rogl; Libor Remta; Milan Háva; Vlasta Henych; Daniel Švarc; Martin Melmuka; Pavel Kohout; Roman Izaiáš; Petr Vajda; Josef Cigánek; Marek Žežulka; David Hradílek; Tomáš Eisler; Radek Kroc
- Website: torr.cz

Törr is a Czech thrash/black metal band founded in Prague in 1977. They are considered one of the first Czech black metal bands. They have released ten studio albums, two live albums, and two compilations.

== History ==
=== Early years: 1977–1986 ===
Törr, named after the unit of pressure, was formed in 1977 by vocalist and guitarist Ota Hereš and drummer Pavel Kadeřábek, though the original spelling of their name lacked the metal umlaut it sports today. The band began by playing heavy metal, and a year later, they were joined by bass player Filip Moldan. Michael Jakubův soon replaced Kadeřábek on drums and in 1980, they added a second guitarist, Jiří Podzimek, becoming a foursome. Podzimek left a year later, however, and the band returned to playing as a trio until 1983, when David Strnad took on second guitar duties. Around this time, following Motörhead's example, the band added the metal umlaut to their name. In the summer of 1984, David Strnad was replaced by Miroslav Mach and a year later, Bogan Chadt took over on vocal duties. Several more lineup changes took place and in 1986, the band broke up due to other commitments.

=== 666 and demo albums: 1986–1989 ===
In 1986, bassist Vlasta Henych and Törr founder Ota Hereš formed the band 666 with drummer Pavel Konvalinka. Later that year, Milan Háva, who had previously played with Törr, took over on drums, and the trio switched to playing black metal under their old name. At this time, Henych and Hereš shared vocal duties. The band released their first demo tape in 1987, titled Witchhammer. In 1988, due to negative publicity from their stage shows, the Czechoslovak government banned the group from performing. This situation lasted until 1989, when the band released their second demo, the live recording Törr Gang Live '89. That year, Hereš left the band to perform his mandatory military service. Törr released one more demo that year, Masturbace mozku, which included guest vocals by Arakain singer Aleš Brichta.

=== First three albums and Zemětřesení: 1990–1993 ===
In 1990, Törr, consisting of Henych on bass and vocals, Daniel "Šakal" Švarc on guitar and vocals, and Martin "Melmus" Melmuka on drums, released their debut album, Armageddon, which sold over 60,000 copies. It featured Ota Balage on keyboards. That year, second guitarist Pavel "Monroe" Kohout joined the band and also contributed additional vocals. In 1991, Törr followed their debut with the album Institut klinické smrti, whose cover art depicted a flayed Jesus Christ on a cross. After Kohout's departure in 1992, the band, once more a trio, released their third album, Chcípni o kus dál, which bore a mixed sound, less the pure black metal of their previous efforts.

In 1992, Vlasta Henych won the Černá vrána rock/metal poll as best bassist. The poll was intended to assemble a group that would play the music of Jiří Schelinger, who had died in 1981. The supergroup, which included vocalist Aleš Brichta, guitarist Miloš "Dodo" Doležal, and drummer Štěpán Smetáček, was called Zemětřesení. They released a self-titled album in 1993.

=== Back to classics; hiatus: 1993–1995 ===
In 1993, the band returned to their original lineup, with Ota Hereš on guitar and vocals, Vlasta Henych on bass and vocals, and Milan Háva on drums. From this emerged the retrospective album Kladivo na čarodějnice 1986–1989, consisting of re-recorded selections of Törr's early material, considered their most iconic work. The record also featured Martin Melmuka and Pavel Kohout. Following the release, the band went on indefinite hiatus.

=== Masked return and change of sound: 1995–1999 ===
In 1995, after two years of inactivity, Henych revived the group with a new lineup that wore balaclavas while performing. The two new members were revealed to be Roman "Izzi" Izaiáš on guitar and vocals, and drummer Petr Vajda. They released their next album, Morituri te salutant, in 1996, while performing in disguise, an image they presented even on the album cover. The sound of the record was a departure for Törr; leaving black metal behind, they switched to hard rock, which alienated many fans. In 1996, the band released their first concert album, titled Live. Composed of eleven tracks, the recording includes one of Jiří Schelinger's hits, the song "Lupič Willy", which the Zemětřesení project recorded in 1993. The band continued to tour but didn't issue any new releases until 1999's double disc Gallery, which included remastered versions of their first four albums.

=== New material and departure of Henych: 2000–2010 ===
In 2000, Törr released their first new album since 1996. Tanec svatýho Víta was another departure for the band, who experimented with electronic sounds, moving away from metal/rock. This caused another exodus of fans, and the album performed poorly. Three years later, Ota Hereš rejoined after fourteen years, and the band returned to their black metal roots. Radek Sladký joined on drums, and the trio released the album Made in Hell in 2003. Guest musicians included Big Boss and Miloš "Dodo" Doležal, and the album contained a cover of "Countess Bathory" by Venom and another of "Sympathy for the Devil" by the Rolling Stones. In 2006, Törr released Törritorium and the triple-CD rarities collection Inkubátörr. This was followed by a 2007 reissue of their first demo, Witchhammer, and the 2010 live album Inferno Nocturno. At the end of the decade, Henych left the band due to artistic differences and started his own group, Henych 666.

=== New lineup and new material: 2010–present ===
Törr returned with a new lineup later in 2010, including bassist Jan "Bart" Bartoš. Their next album, Tempus Fugit, was released in the fall of 2011. The band's second demo, Törr Gang Live, was reissued in 2015. Seeking a bigger sound, the band hired second guitarist Radek "Reddy" Kroc (Kreyson, Vitacit). He toured with the band throughout 2015, but left the following year, before the release of Törr's tenth studio album, Black 'n' Roll.

== Band members ==
Current

- Ota Hereš – guitar, vocals
- Radek Sladký – drums
- Jan "Bart" Bartoš – bass

Past

- Pavel Kadeřábek – drums
- Filip Moldan – bass
- Michael Jakubův – drums
- Jiří Podzimek – guitar
- David Strnad – guitar
- Miroslav Mach – guitar
- Bogan Chadt – vocals
- Jiří Sochan – drums
- Jiří Rogl – drums
- Libor Remta – drums
- Milan Háva – drums
- Vlasta Henych – bass, vocals
- Daniel Šakal Švarc – guitar, vocals
- Martin "Melmus" Melmuka – drums
- Pavel "Monroe" Kohout – guitar, vocals
- Roman "Izzi" Izaiáš – guitar, vocals
- Petr Vajda – drums
- Josef Cigánek – drums
- Marek Žežulka – drums
- David Hradílek – bass, vocals
- Tomáš Eisler – guitar, vocals
- Radek "Reddy" Kroc – guitar

== Discography ==
Studio albums

- Armageddon (1990)
- Institut klinické smrti (1991)
- Chcípni o kus dál (1992)
- Kladivo na čarodějnice 1986–1989 (1993)
- Morituri te salutant (1996)
- Tanec svatýho Víta (2000)
- Made in Hell (2003)
- Törritorium (2006)
- Tempus Fugit (2011)
- Black 'n' Roll (2016)

Demos

- Witchhammer (1987) reissued in 2007
- Törr Gang Live (1989) reissued in 2015
- Masturbace mozku (1989)

Live albums

- Live (1997)
- Inferno Nocturno (2010)

Compilations

- Gallery (1999)
- Inkubátörr (2006)
