= Miloš Doležal =

Czech musician (born 1966)

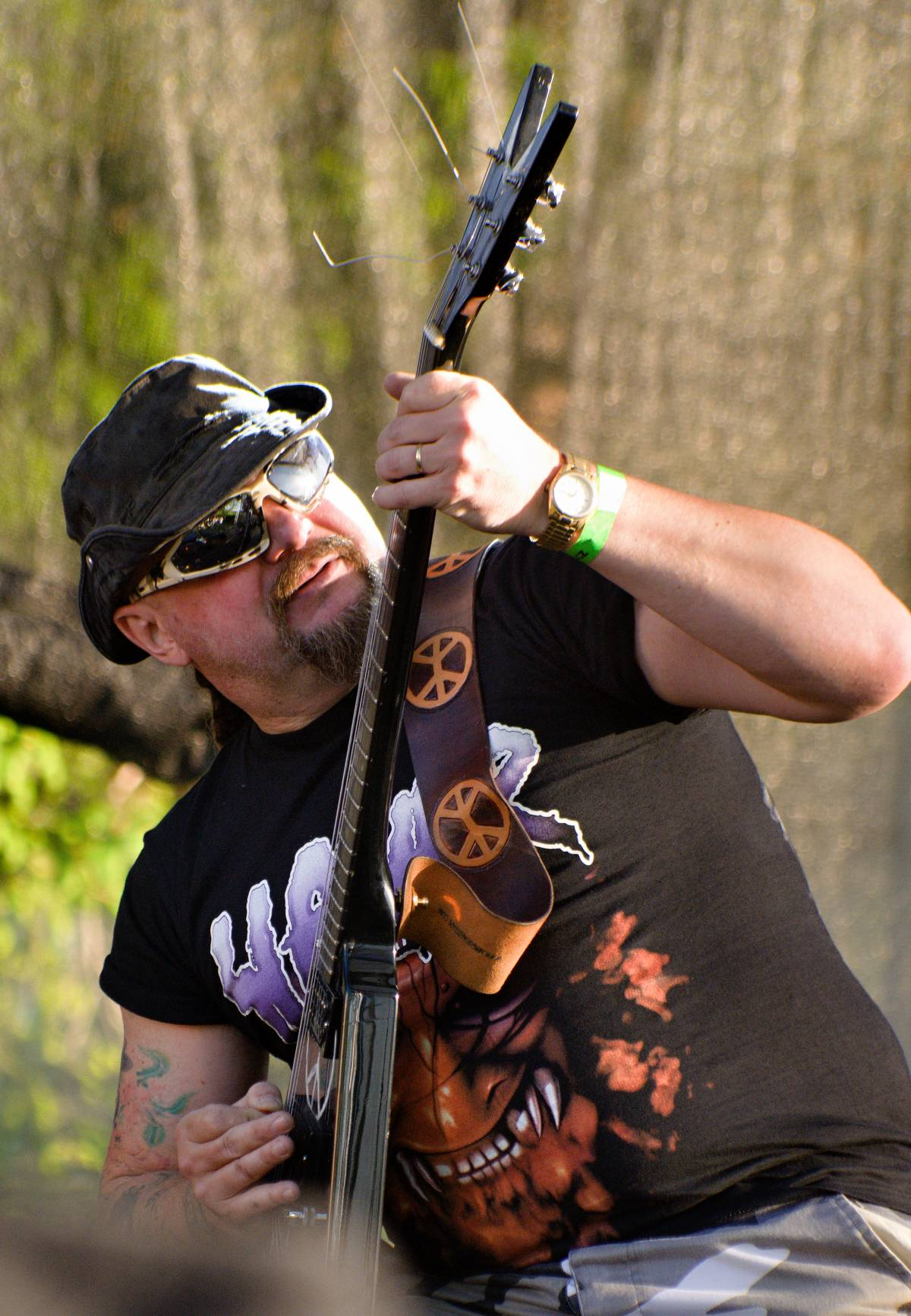
- Doležal in 2017

Background information
- Also known as: Dodo
- Born: Miloš Doležal; 12 August 1966 (age 60); Karviná, Czechoslovakia
- Genres: Heavy metal; hard rock
- Occupations: Musician; songwriter; producer
- Instruments: Guitar; vocals
- Years active: 1985–present
- Formerly of: Pražský výběr; Vitacit; Zemětřesení

Miloš "Dodo" Doležal (born 12 August 1966) is a Czech guitarist, composer, singer, and producer who has released a number of solo albums since 1991. He gained fame in the late 1980s as the frontman of the heavy metal band Vitacit. He has also played with the band Pražský výběr and spearheaded the supergroup Zemětřesení.

== Biography ==
=== Early career and Vitacit ===
Doležal began singing in a children's choir in his hometown of Karviná. Some of his earliest musical projects include stints with the bands Kennel, Asparagus, Žádná Křeč, and Pražský výběr. In 1985, he joined the band Vitacit as lead guitarist. At the time, the band leader was vocalist Ladislav Křížek (Kreyson, Citron), and the two wrote a number of hits together. When Křížek left Vitacit in 1987, Doležal became the new frontman. This period saw him at the peak of his fame. In 1991, Doležal announced that he was moving to the United States to further his musical studies and improve his guitar skills at the Guitar Institute of Technology in Los Angeles. He also released his first instrumental solo album, titled My Little World, which included contributions from some of his Vitacit band members.

=== Solo work and Zemětřesení ===
While studying in Los Angeles, Doležal gained experience in recording studios and made the acquaintance of various musicians and sound engineers. He returned to Czechoslovakia with guitarist Guy Mann-Dude (The Dudes of Wrath) and drummer David Eagle (OHM). The two musicians contributed to his second solo album Dráždivý Dotek, which was recorded in Ostrava and featured the hit single "Soudím".

In 1992, Doležal won the Černá vrána rock/metal poll as best guitarist, together with Arakain vocalist Aleš Brichta, Törr bassist Vlasta Henych, and prolific drummer Štěpán Smetáček. The poll was intended to put together a group which would bring to life the music of Jiří Schelinger, who had died in 1981. The supergroup was called Zemětřesení, and they released a self-titled album in 1993. The project released a live album in 2001 in its original lineup.

In 1994, Doležal reunited with Guy Mann-Dude at the Rudolfinum studio in Prague to record their second album together. Drum tracks were recorded separately in Los Angeles by well known session drummer Gregg Bissonette. Simply titled Miloš Dodo Doležal/Guy Mann-Dude, the album was released the same year.

=== Return to Vitacit ===
At the end of 1994, it was announced that the band Vitacit were back together, again with Doležal in the lead. They recorded a new album, Navostro, the following year, and opened for Iron Maiden during their October 1995 Prague concert, part of the band's X Factour with Blaze Bayley. 1996 saw the release of another Vitacit album, titled Zaživa mrtví, which was recorded at Doležal's studio Hacienda in Žirovnice. The same year, Vitacit contributed a cover of Metallica's "Fight Fire with Fire" to the tribute album 10 Years After...A Tribute to Cliff Burton. In 1997, the group opened for Alice Cooper in the Czech Republic, and the following year, they disbanded once more.

=== 1997–present: Solo work and Zemětřesení 2 ===
In 1997, Doležal recorded an album of Jimi Hendrix covers titled Dodo hraje Hendrixe. The album also featured Bars Sparks on bass guitar and Shane Gaalaas on drums. Following this, the artist decided to devote more time to his family and working at his studio. In 2001, he released Outlaw (The Electro Acoustic Tribute to Bon Jovi). In 2003, Doležal toured a number of Czech clubs with the bands Clop and Tortharry. In 2005, he published his second instrumental album, titled Nejvyšší vibrace, with the help of a number of world-class musicians including bassists John Patitucci and Doug Wimbish, and drummer Jonathan Mover.

In 2009, Doležal's son Miloš Doležal Jr. began playing bass in his father's band on a regular basis. 2010 saw the release of Doležal's next vocal album, titled Despekt, which also included contributions from the younger Miloš. The album Gen Sumerian came out in 2012, and Dodo toured with the band Storm Clear on their Slovak tour. His next album, Ohněm, was released in 2016 and heavily promoted during the Souboj Rebelů Radegast Tour 2016, which also included the bands Kern, Vitacit (with Doležal on vocal duty), Arakain, and Citron, with Ladislav Křížek at the helm.

In 2019, Doležal announced that the Zemětřesení project would be revived and a new album released. The fresh band lineup consisted of the older Doležal on guitar, his son Miloš Jr. on bass, Mladen Djelmo on vocals, and erstwhile bandmate Štěpán Smetáček on drums. The album Zemětřesení 2 came out later the same year.

=== Personal life ===
Doležal met his wife while still in high school. They have two daughters and a son, Miloš. Since 1994, he has been living with his family in Žirovnice, where he has his own recording studio, Hacienda.

== Discography ==
Vitacit

- Vzhůru přes oceán (1990)
- Navostro (1995)
- Zaživa mrtví (1996)

Solo

- My Little World (1991)
- Dráždivý Dotek (1992)
- Miloš Dodo Doležal/Guy Mann-Dude (1994) with Guy Mann-Dude
- Dodo hraje Hendrixe (1997)
- Outlaw (The Electro Acoustic Tribute to Bon Jovi) (2001)
- Nejvyšší vibrace (2005)
- Despekt (2010)
- Gen Sumerian (2012)
- Ohněm (2016)

Zemětřesení

- Zemětřesení (1993)
- Zemětřesení - Live (2001)
- Zemětřesení 2 (2019)
