= Alena Veselá =

Czech organist and music teacher (1923–2025)

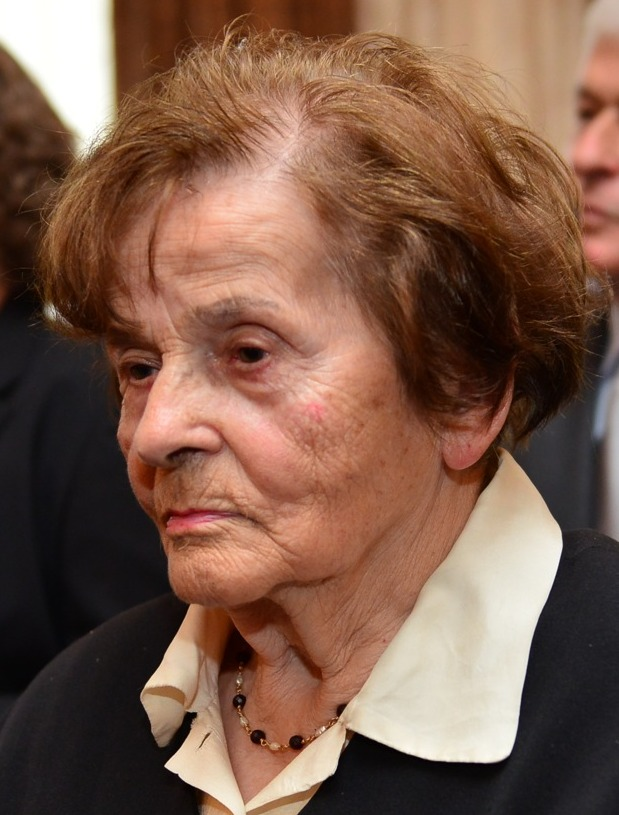
- Veselá in 2013
- Born: 7 July 1923; Brno, Czechoslovakia
- Died: 11 May 2025 (aged 101); Brno, Czech Republic
- Occupations: Organist; academic teacher
- Organizations: Janáček Academy of Performing Arts
- Awards: Medal of Merit

Alena Veselá (married name Štěpánková; 7 July 1923 – 11 May 2025) was a Czech organist and academic music teacher, rector of the Janáček Academy of Performing Arts in Brno from 1990 to 1997. She played concerts internationally.

== Life and career ==
Veselá was born in Brno on 7 July 1923. Her parents were Vítězslav Veselý, a professor of chemistry and his wife Helena; she grew up with a brother, Karel. Her first piano teacher was Zdeňka Illnerová. Veselá studied organ with František Michálek at the Brno Conservatoire from 1942 to 1947. She studied further at the newly established Brno Janáček Academy of Music (JAMU) from 1947 to 1951. She studied musicology at the Masaryk University in Brno.

From 1952, she worked for almost fifty years at the Academy where she was the head of the department of keyboard instruments from 1986 to 1990 and rector from 1990 to 1997. She was the first rector after the Soviet period, and the only woman on the post in the academy's history. She pursued a historically informed interpretation of early organ music. Among her students were Věra Heřmanová, Kamila Klugarová, Petr Kolař, Zdeněk Nováček, and David Postránecký. She was responsible for expanding buildings of the JAMU and took care of its organ. She was awarded the Medal of Merit in the field of arts and education in 2020, but a ceremony with the President could be held only in 2022.

Veselá gave concerts in Czechoslovakia and abroad, in Europe and the United States. She was permitted to travel, although she was no member of the Communist Party. She managed to discover organ compositions by Czech composers in European archives. She recorded organ music by Czech composers, both historic such as František Brixi and Jiří Ignác Linek and contemporary including Petr Eben. She played a suite by Louis-Nicolas Clérambault in a concert of the 42nd Brno Organ Festival on her 99th birthday.

She was the chairwoman of the association for the construction of a new concert hall in Brno and participated in the organization of the Brno International Music Festival. She played a significant role in completing the reconstruction of the Besední Dom, the seat of the Brno Philharmonic, and took care of its organ. In 2025 she was present, when the cornerstone of a new concert hall was laid.

=== Personal life and death ===
Veselá was active in sports as a girl, winning a regional slalom and achieving level 5 of 6 in mounting climbing in the High Tatras. She married Mirek Štěpánek in 1954. The couple had one child and lived in Brno.

Veselá died on 11 May 2025, aged 101.
