= Aleš Brichta =

Czech musician (born 1959)

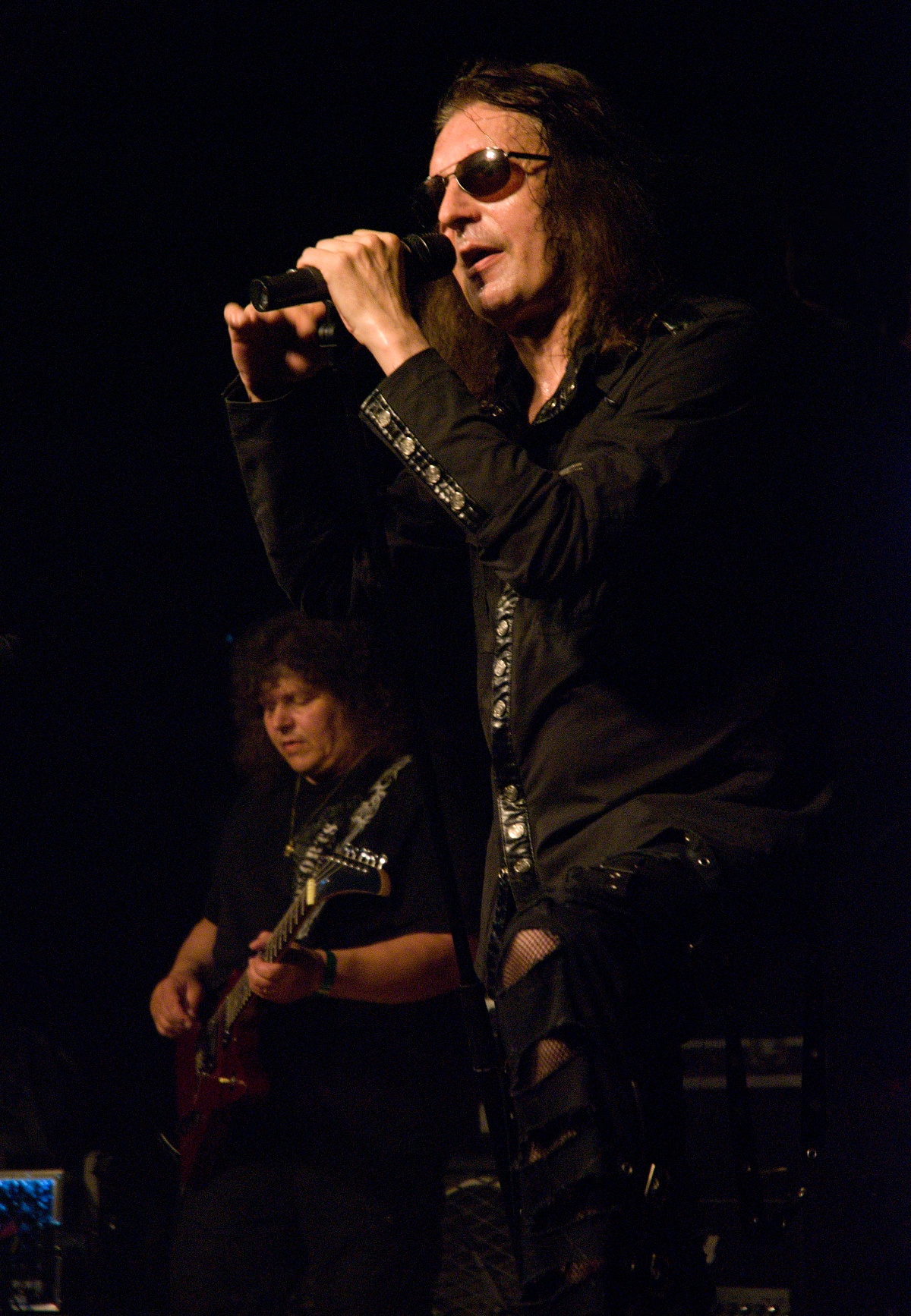
- Brichta in 2012

Background information
- Born: 9 August 1959 (age 66); Prague, Czechoslovakia
- Genres: heavy metal
- Occupation: Musician
- Instruments: Vocals; guitar
- Years active: 1982–present
- Member of: Aleš Brichta Project
- Formerly of: Arakain, Aleš Brichta Band
- Website: brichta.cz

Aleš Brichta (born 9 August 1959 in Prague, Czechoslovakia) is a Czech heavy metal singer, songwriter, and artist. He is a founding member of the band Arakain, which he left in 2002. He now plays with Aleš Brichta Project.

== Biography ==
In 1982, together with guitarist Jiří Urban and drummer Miroslav Nedvěd, Brichta founded the heavy metal band Arakain, which went on to become one of the most seminal metal bands in Czech history. Brichta recorded eleven albums with the rockers, but departed in 2002. In 2005, he founded his own group, ABBAND (Aleš Brichta Band), in which he was joined by former collaborators Mirek Mach (Arakain) and Karel Adam. They released four studio albums between 2006 and 2010.

In 1992, Brichta won the Černá vrána (black crow) rock/metal poll as best guitarist, together with Vitacit guitarist Miloš "Dodo" Doležal, Törr bassist Vlasta Henych, and prolific drummer Štěpán Smetáček. The poll was intended to put together a group which would bring to life the music of Jiří Schelinger, who had died in 1981. The supergroup was called Zemětřesení (Earthquake), and they released a self-titled album in 1993.

In 2008, Brichta was inducted into the Beatová síň slávy, the Czech version of the Rock and Roll Hall of Fame.

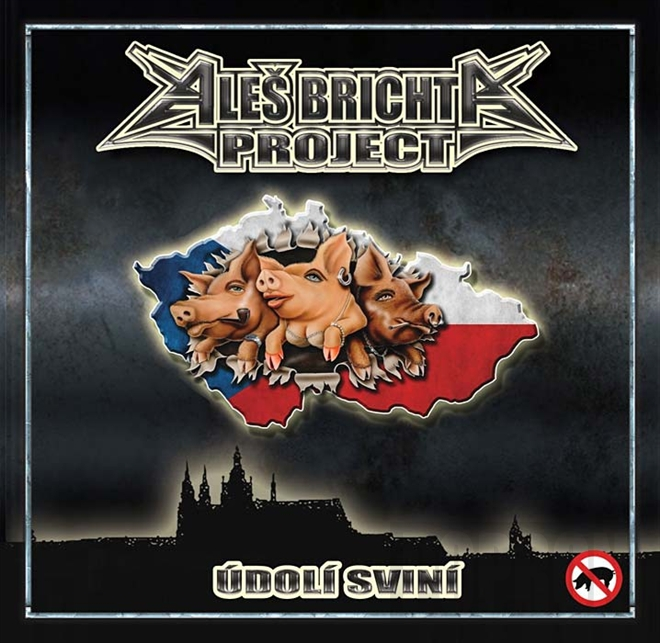
Aleš Brichta Project Údolí sviní album cover (2013)

On Brichta's 50th birthday in 2009, a number of Czech and Slovak musicians collaborated on a tribute album, titled AB 50 – A Tribute to Aleš Brichta.

Aleš Brichta Band underwent a complete personnel change in 2011, leaving its namesake as the sole remaining member. The group returned with a new album in 2013, albeit under the moniker Aleš Brichta Project. As of 2026, the band has released two studio albums.

Apart from playing with a number of different groups and projects over the years, Brichta has also led a solo career, releasing seven studio albums between 1994 and 2014.

== Personal life ==
Brichta has two children from his first marriage, a son, Aleš Jr., and daughter Michaela. On 16 June 2016, he married for the second time, wedding his 33-year-old Polish partner Joanna.

Brichta has spoken at far-right Freedom and Direct Democracy party rallies. On 1 July 2015, he took part in a march against immigration and refugee quotas, calling for a departure from the EU.

== Trivia ==
Brichta is related to Russian war painter Vasily Vereshchagin (1842–1904), whose painting The Apotheosis of War is used on the cover of the 1999 Arakain album Farao.

== Discography ==
=== Solo ===
Studio albums

- Růže pro Algernon (1994)
- Ráno ve dveřích Armády spásy (1996)
- Hledač pokladů (1998)
- American Bull (2001)
- Anděl posledního soudu (2003)
- Legendy 2 (2004)
- Papírovej drak (2014 - credited as Aleš Brichta Trio)

Compilations

- Dívka s perlami ve vlasech - Best Of (2000)
- American Bull - New Edition (2002)
- Best Of: Beatová síň slávy (2008)

DVDs

- Aleš Brichta 12x (2001)

=== with Arakain ===
Studio albums

- Thrash The Trash (1990)
- Schizofrenie (1991)
- Black Jack (1992)
- Salto Mortale (1993)
- Thrash! (1994)
- Legendy (1995)
- S.O.S. (1996)
- Apage Satanas (1998)
- Farao (1999)
- Forrest Gump (2001)
- Archeology (2002)

=== with Grizzly ===
- !New Spirit! (2003)

=== Aleš Brichta Band ===
Studio albums

- Divadlo snů (2006)
- Nech si to projít hlavou (2007)
- Deratizer (2009)
- Grizzly (2010)

Compilations and live albums

- Best Of: Beatová síň slávy (2008)
- 50 - Tesla Arena - True Live (2009)

=== Aleš Brichta Project ===
- Údolí sviní (2013)
- Anebo taky datel (2015)

=== Other projects ===
- Zemětřesení (1993)
- Hattrick (2000)
- Zemětřesení - Live (2001)
- Hattrick I+II (2004)
