= Ignác Jan Hanuš =

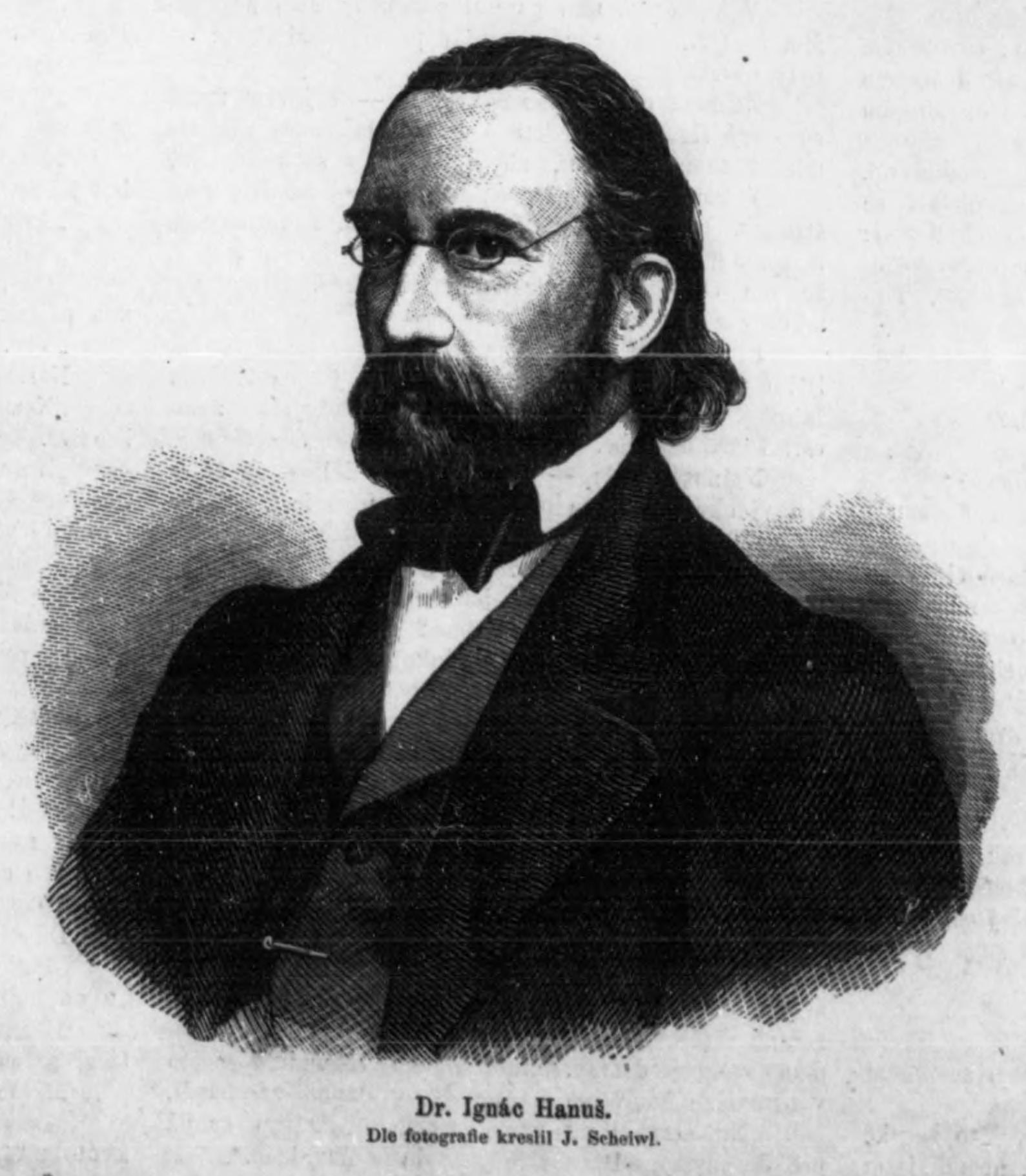
- Portrait of Hanuš from Světozor by Josef Scheiwl (1869)
- Born: 28 October 1812; Prague, Bohemia, Austrian Empire
- Died: 19 May 1869 (aged 56); Prague, Bohemia, Austria-Hungary

Ignác Jan Hanuš German: Ignaz Johann Hanusch; 28 October 1812 – 19 May 1869) was a Czech philosopher and librarian.

== Life and work ==
Hanuš was born on 28 October 1812 in Prague, Bohemia. He studied at the grammar school in Staré Město, where one of his teachers was Josef Jungmann. This encounter created an interest in philosophy, which he studied at Charles University, graduating in 1831. In order to have more time for contemplation, he entered the Order of the Premonstratensians at Strahov Monastery. This experience failed to meet his expectations, so he left to study law at the University of Vienna. After 1835, he worked there as an adjunct. A year later, he received his doctorate and became a full Professor at the University of Lemberg; aged only twenty-four. There, he established contact with many Poles and Ukrainians and became acquainted with Slavic mythology. In 1842, he published the results of his studies (in German) as Die Wissenschaft des slawischen Mythus. He also wrote several school textbooks.

In 1847, he joined the Faculty of Philosophy at Palacký University Olomouc, where he taught the history of philosophy and ethics. A year later, he became an editor at Die Neue Zeit. During the Revolutions of 1848 in the Austrian Empire, he became involved in organizations associated with the Czech National Revival.

He returned to Prague in 1849, and became a lecturer at the university, in German and Czech, and was a specialist on the life and work of Tomáš Štítný ze Štítného. This ended in 1852, during a repressive period, when he was dismissed for teaching the philosophy of Hegel, rather than the officially approved ideas of Johann Friedrich Herbart. After that, he gave private lessons and devoted himself to research. Later, he became a member of the Royal Bohemian Society of Sciences, and manager of their library. He was also an honorary member of the Imperial Russian Archaeological Society.

In 1860, he created some controversy when he demonstrated that Glagolitic script predated Cyrillic as a medium for the Slavic languages, and created resentment when he questioned the authenticity of some ancient Czech documents, many of which had important symbolic value within the National Revival.

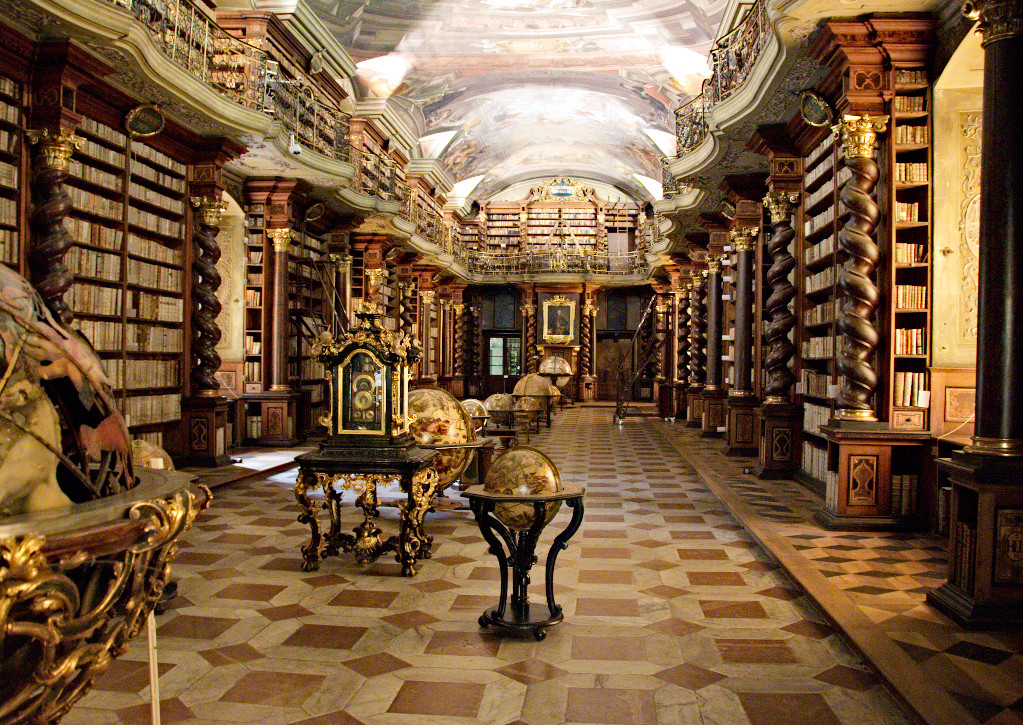
Baroque hall at the National Library

That same year, he took over management of the National Library, following an attempted suicide by its director, Pavel Josef Šafařík. He increased the number of employees, reorganized the catalog, expanded the reading room and extended its operating hours.

He suffered a stroke in May 1869, and died three days later.
