= Citron (band) =

Czech heavy metal band

- Origin: Ostrava, Czechoslovakia
- Genres: Heavy metal; hard rock
- Years active: 1976–present
- Labels: Supraphon; Popron
- Spinoffs: Limetal
- Members: Ladislav Křížek; Djordje Erič; Pavel Hanus; Jiří "George" Rain; Tanja
- Past members: Olda Říha; Tolja Kohout; Miloš Nop; Petr Michalík; Vladimír Kubala; Jiří Schmutz; Milan Tutsch; Miloslav Benýšek; Stanislav Hranický; Jindřich Kvita; Jiří Krejčí; Václav Vlasák; Jaroslav Bartoň; Tibor Šándor; Pavol Chodelka; František Michalík; Henry Tóth; Libor Kozelský; Aleš Hubáček; Pavel Silber; Pavel Novotný; Ladislav Krečmer; Stanislav Balko; Jiří Šperl; Radim Pařízek
- Website: citron-group.cz

Citron is a Czech hard rock/heavy metal band founded in Ostrava in 1976. The band's history is divided into two distinct eras: between 1976 and 1981, when their name was spelled with a long "ó", Citrón, and they played mainly blues rock. During this time, the band leader was bassist Petr Michalík. The second era, from 1982 until the present, signalled a change in musical style towards hard rock and heavy metal, with drummer Radim Pařízek as band leader and the group's name slightly altered to Citron. As of 2021, Citron has released twelve studio albums (including three English versions), two EPs, and three official compilation albums.

== History ==
=== Beginning and end of first era: 1976–1981 ===
Citrón's inception dates back to 1976, when several musicians left the side of František Ringo Čech and founded an accompanying band for singer Aleš Ulm. Among them were guitarist Olda Říha, drummer Tolja Kohout (Katapult), keyboardist Miloš Nop, and bass guitarist Petr Michalík, who gave the group its name. They recorded two singles in this lineup, but Michalík went his separate way shortly after and Citrón became its own entity, though with only one member. Vladimír Kubala soon joined on vocals, followed by guitarist Jiří Schmutz and drummer Milan Tutsch. They began to play blues rock, influenced by such bands as Bad Company, Free, and Led Zeppelin.

The four were already experienced musicians, and they soon established themselves not only on the radio, but also on television. They released their first single, "Tvých sedmnáct/Pantomima reklam", under Supraphon in 1978, and it proved a success. Their next single, "Až se vrátí rokenrol/Diskžokej", came out the following year, and Citrón found themselves at the top of the Czechoslovak rock scene alongside such acts as Katapult and Jiří Schelinger's band. The same year, one major lineup change occurred: drummer Milan Tutsch left to join Katapult and was replaced by Radim Pařízek, who would later go on to lead the group. Additionally, Miloslav Benýšek joined Citrón on second guitar. They played a large number of concerts throughout Czechoslovakia, and released two more singles as they worked on their debut album, Obratník Raka, which was recorded in 1981. Two versions of the record were produced, one for the domestic market and one for international audiences. The Czech version was never released, however; only the English one, titled Tropic of Cancer, was published, in 1983, though by that point the band had mostly disintegrated: Michalík and Kubala, and later Benýšek, left the project. Only guitarist Schmutz and drummer Pařízek remained.

=== New direction: 1982–1987 ===
Radim Pařízek took over the leadership of Citron and brought in seasoned musician Stanislav Hranický (Majestic) on vocals. They were joined by guitarist Jindřich Kvita and bassist Jiří Krejčí. In this lineup, they recorded a few singles in 1983, and moved sonically towards a heavier sound. The same year, Schmutz and Krejčí left the group and were replaced by guitarist Jaroslav Bartoň and bassist Václav Vlasák, both from the band Proto.

Citron's musical style began to change gradually around this time, tending more towards heavy metal. Work began on their upcoming album in 1985, recorded at Prague's Mozarteum. Two versions of the album were created, again. The Czech version, Plni energie, was released in 1986, and Full of Energy followed a year later. The Czech album was certified Gold, and Citron won a Zlatý slavík award, taking second place after the Slovak band Elán. A concert tour was organized, which saw the band travel to West Germany, among other locations. In 1987, vocalist Stanislav Hranický broke his leg after one concert in Bratislava and became unable to perform.

=== Ladislav Křížek: 1987–1989 ===
The band had to solve the unexpected situation quickly, and they hired vocalist Ladislav Křížek from the Prague band Vitacit. Preparations for their third album, Radegast, began the same year, with the band recording in their own studio. Two singles were released, and demonstrated a definitive shift towards heavy metal. The album came out in the fall of 1987, again in two versions, and the Czech record was certified Gold. The English record came out two years later, under the same title. A number of large concerts followed, this time not only in Czechoslovakia but also in Poland, the USSR, and Germany. Citron also made numerous television appearances, topped various music charts, and won Song of the Year with their single "Zase dál". In 1988, they achieved a crowning victory by winning the Zlatý slavík award, becoming Band of the Year. During this time, the band also began collaborating with singer Tanja Kauerová, known by the mononym Tanja, who went on to marry frontman Radim Pařízek. Tanja also sang the successful 1988 duet "Kam jen jdou lásky mé" with Křížek, which was later released on his debut solo album Zlatej Chlapec in 1991.

At the beginning of 1989, Citron began preparing their next studio album, Vypusťte psy!, but disagreements within the band led to Křížek's departure after the release of only one single, "Uragán/Svět patří nám", though the song became an immediate hit. By August, Křížek was gone, followed shortly after by Jaroslav Bartoň, and the two went on to start their own band, Kreyson. Citron found replacements in Slovakia in the form of singer Tibor Šándor and guitarist Pavol Chodelka. In this new lineup, the band completed a number of planned concerts in the fall and continued recording the new album, though Šándor would not end up singing on it.

=== Lineup changes, new albums: 1990–1993 ===
At the beginning of 1990, Citron discovered singer František "Fany" Michalík and replaced Tibor Šándor. The band went on a concert tour of France. Another Slovak guitarist, Henry Tóth, joined up. With this new lineup, they went back into the studio to rework their upcoming album. Vypusťte psy! was finally released in May 1990. A concert tour to promote it followed, but afterward a period of inactivity ensued, which resulted in further personnel changes. In the spring of 1991, Pavel Chodelka and Henry Tóth left and were replaced by Libor Kozelský. Citron began preparing another record, but in the summer, the band neared disintegration. Jindřich Kvita, Václav Vlasák, and František Michalík chose to leave and form the band Funny. Only Libor Kozelský and Radim Pařízek remained, so again, there was a need to rebuild Citron from the ground up. In the fall of 1991, new musicians were hired: Aleš Hubáček on vocals, Pavel Silber on bass, and Pavel Novotný on guitar, though this latter was soon replaced by Ladislav Krečmer. In this format, the band opened for Ian Gillan in Czechoslovakia and in the spring of 1992, they released the album Sexbomby. Few concerts took place to promote it, however. At the end of 1993, Citron's most successful lineup, from their Plni energie era, met up and began planning a comeback.

=== Tragedy, Best of, more tragedy: 1994–2013 ===
This period was marked mainly by the band's comeback to large stages, as well as one notable loss. Just as Citron was in the process of producing their first hits compilation in 1997, guitarist Jindra Kvita died. This was a major shock to the band, and put a stop to the album preparations. It wasn't until 1999 that Best of Citron, dedicated to the memory of Jindra Kvita, was released. The album did well commercially and was certified Gold. The band continued to perform as a quartet for a while, but eventually hired guitarist Stanislav Balko, though he didn't stay long and was replaced by the returning Libor Kozelský.

In 2001, Citron reunited with former vocalist Ladislav Křížek. A retrospective album, Síla návratů, consisting of re-recorded versions of old songs, mainly from the Radegast era, was released. A short concert tour followed, after which Křížek departed again. In 2004, the band was invited to perform in the United States, where they held several successful concerts and shot the video for a new single, "Rock, rock, rock". More performances followed, including at festivals, and Citron again returned to the studio to prepare a new album.

In 2008, Citron opened for Judas Priest at the Ostravar Aréna in their hometown. At the beginning of 2009, Libor Kozelský left the band and was replaced by guitarist Jiří Šperl. In May 2010, the long-awaited album Bigbítový pánbů was finally released.

On 7 April 2013, former Citron vocalist Stanislav Hranický died of cancer.

=== Rebuilding the band, Křížek, and Rebelie: 2013–present ===
In May 2015, Citron supported Def Leppard on their tour of the Czech Republic, opening for them both in Prague and Ostrava. In September, after much internal squabbling, Citron came close to disintegrating yet again. František Michalík, Jaroslav Bartoň, Jiří Šperl, and Václav Vlasák went on to found the group Limetal, leaving drummer Radim Pařízek as the only remaining member of Citron. He called on Ladislav Křížek to return to the band once more, and they were joined by Djordje Erič and Pavel Hanus on guitar, and Jiří "George" Rain (Kreyson) on bass. The newly reformed band went straight back to work on a new album. Before its release, they launched a concert tour and issued the EP Rebelie Vol. 1, followed a year later by another EP, Rebelie Vol. 2. Former collaborator Tanja joined them at a number of shows during their tour, and as of 2020 is a permanent member of the band. The planned album, Rebelie rebelů, was finally released towards the end of 2016. A year later, Citron finally released their 1981 album Obratník Raka, which had until then only been published in its English version.

Radim Pařízek, the last remaining member of the band's original lineup, died on 2 March 2021 after complications from a recent surgery; he was 67 years old.

== Band members ==
Current

- Ladislav Křížek – vocals
- Djordje Erič – guitar
- Pavel Hanus – guitar
- Jiří "George" Rain – bass
- Tanja – vocals

Past

- Olda Říha – guitar
- Tolja Kohout – drums
- Miloš Nop – keyboards
- Petr Michalík – bass
- Vladimír Kubala – vocals
- Jiří Schmutz – guitar
- Milan Tutsch – drums
- Miloslav Benýšek – guitar
- Stanislav Hranický – vocals
- Jindřich Kvita – guitar
- Jiří Krejčí – bass
- Václav Vlasák – bass
- Jaroslav Bartoň – guitar
- Tibor Šándor – vocals
- Pavol Chodelka – guitar
- František Michalík – vocals
- Henry Tóth – guitar
- Libor Kozelský – guitar
- Aleš Hubáček – vocals
- Pavel Silber – bass
- Pavel Novotný – guitar
- Ladislav Krečmer – guitar
- Stanislav Balko – guitar
- Jiří Šperl – guitar
- Radim Pařízek – drums

== Discography ==
Studio albums

- Obratník Raka (1981 - unreleased)
- Tropic of Cancer (1983 - English version of Obratník Raka)
- Plni energie (1986)
- Full of Energy (1987 - English version of Plni energie)
- Radegast (1987)
- Radegast (1989 - English version)
- Vypusťte psy! (1990)
- Sex bomby (1992)
- Síla návratů (2001)
- Bigbítový pánbů (2010)
- Jen si od plic zanadávej (2013)
- Rebelie rebelů (2016)
- Obratník Raka (2017 - previously unreleased 1981 album)

EPs

- Rebelie Vol. 1 (2015)
- Rebelie Vol. 2 (2016)

Compilations

- Best of Citron (1999)
- Singly (2017)
- 1979–2017 (2017 - box set)
