= Bousov =

Municipality in the Czech Republic

- Municipality
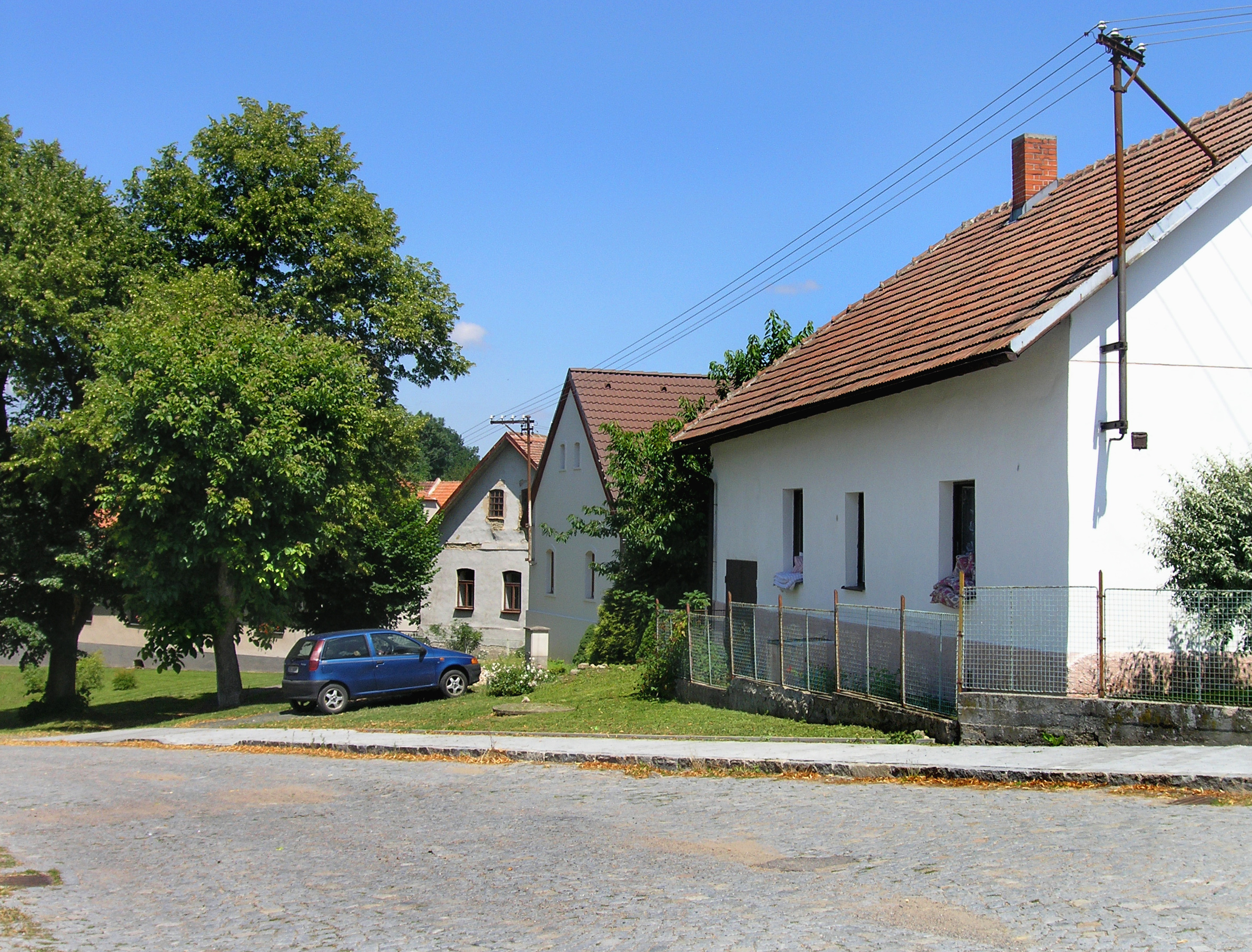
- Centre of Bousov

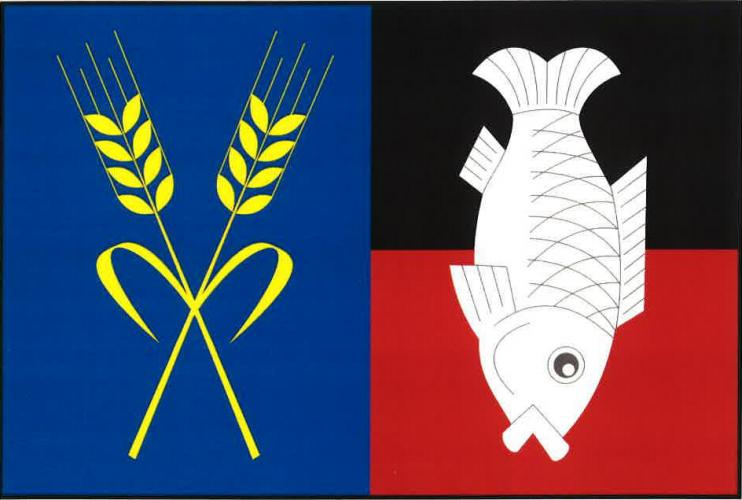
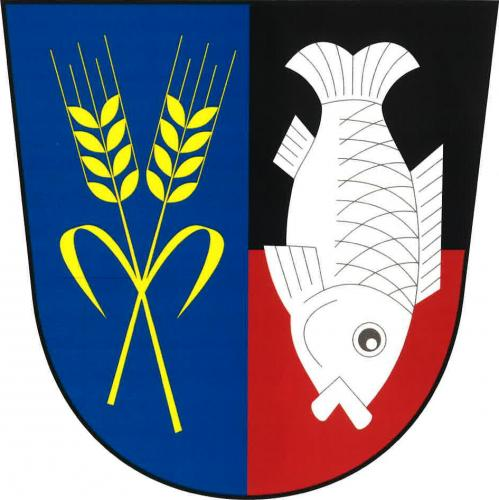
- Flag Coat of arms

- Location in the Czech Republic
- Coordinates: 49°54′6″N 15°32′8″E
- Country: Czech Republic
- Region: Pardubice
- District: Chrudim
- First mentioned: 1359

Area
  - Total: 3.80 km^{2} (1.47 sq mi)
- Elevation: 289 m (948 ft)

Population (2026-01-01)
  - Total: 230
  - Density: 61/km^{2} (160/sq mi)
- Time zone: UTC+1 (CET)
  - Summer (DST): UTC+2 (CEST)
- Postal code: 538 43
- Website: www.bousov.cz

Bousov is a municipality and village in Chrudim District in the Pardubice Region of the Czech Republic. It has about 200 inhabitants.

== Administrative division ==
Bousov consists of two municipal parts (in brackets population according to the 2021 census):

- Bousov (185)
- Tuchov (34)

== Demographics ==
Historical population
| Year | Pop. | ±% |
|---|---|---|
| 1869 | 450 | — |
| 1880 | 487 | +8.2% |
| 1890 | 477 | −2.1% |
| 1900 | 485 | +1.7% |
| 1910 | 533 | +9.9% |
| 1921 | 498 | −6.6% |
| 1930 | 459 | −7.8% |
| 1950 | 292 | −36.4% |
| 1961 | 279 | −4.5% |
| 1970 | 255 | −8.6% |
| 1980 | 227 | −11.0% |
| 1991 | 221 | −2.6% |
| 2001 | 234 | +5.9% |
| 2011 | 213 | −9.0% |
| 2021 | 219 | +2.8% |
Source: Censuses

== Notable people ==
- Jiří Schelinger (1951–1981), singer
