= Ladislav Křížek =

Czech musician (born 1963)

- Also known as: Láďa Křížek
- Born: 24 April 1963 (age 63); Louny, Czechoslovakia
- Genres: Heavy metal; hard rock
- Occupations: Singer; guitarist; songwriter
- Instrument: Vocals, guitar
- Years active: 1985—present
- Member of: Kreyson; Damiens; Citron
- Formerly of: Vitacit
- Website: ladakrizek.com

Ladislav Křížek (born 24 April 1963) is a Czech singer, songwriter, and guitarist active since the mid-1980s. At the beginning of his career, from 1985 to 1987, he sang with the heavy metal band Vitacit. He later joined the group Citron, recording one album with them in 1987, one in 2001, and one more after rejoining, in 2015. He went on to form his own band, Kreyson, in 1989. To date, they have released five studio albums. In 1997, he created the group Damiens with his brother Miroslav. The duo has released three studio albums. Křížek has also published four solo studio albums since 1991.

== Biography ==
=== Beginnings of a singing career ===
Křížek began his career in the now unknown group BMM, after which he joined the Žatec-based band Nervus Vegus. The real beginning of his career happened with the Prague band TAM. Křížek did not stay with them for long, however. In the first months of 1985, TAM was offered an opening slot for the annual concert of the band Orient, which they accepted. This concert was attended by members of the heavy metal band Vitacit, whose lead singer Dan Horyna departed in February of the same year. Vitacit liked Křížek's vocals so much that they offered him the vacant spot, which he accepted.

=== Vitacit ===
Vitacit had been together since 1973 but had never recorded any material. In 1985, after Křížek joined, they met guitarist and singer Miloš "Dodo" Doležal, who became the band's new frontman. Křížek and Doležal went on to write a number of hit songs together. Vitacit had much success and filled concert halls throughout 1985 and 1986. By 1987, they began to attract attention from record labels and received several offers. In January of that year, however, Křížek announced his departure from the band. His last concerts with Vitacit were held in a grim atmosphere, and on 15 March 1987, Křížek and Vitacit performed together for the last time.

=== Citron ===
In February 1987, the Ostrava-based metal band Citron was hit by an unexpected event. Their singer Stanislav Hranický broke his leg and was unable to perform for an extended period of time. For this reason, the band hired Křížek as his replacement. They immediately began to work on their third album, titled Radegast. Upon release, it went Gold and was the first big success for Křížek. The following year, Citron won the Zlatý slavík award. Citron went on to tour extensively, not only in Czechoslovakia, but also in Poland, the USSR, and Germany. They appeared frequently on television, topped music charts, and garnered much success during this period. In early 1989, the band began to prepare their next studio album, Vypusťte psy!, but disagreements began to show among them. They managed to record a demo and release two singles, before Křížek departed the band in August 1989.

=== Kreyson and solo work ===
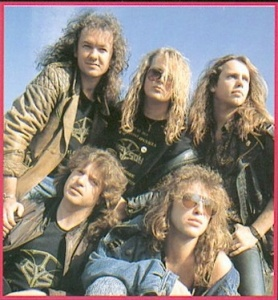
Kreyson in 1990

In 1989, Křížek collaborated with Karel Svoboda on the title song for the television series Dlouhá míle. The same year, together with Citron guitarist Jaroslav Bartoň, he formed the heavy metal group Kreyson. In 1990, Kreyson released their first album, titled Anděl na útěku. It was recorded in both Czech and English versions, with the help of producer Jan Němec. The single "Vzdálená" proved to be a huge success, topping all domestic charts, and the band went on tour for the rest of the year. In 1990, Křížek released his first solo record, Zlatej chlapec, which was also a big success and sold 100,000 copies within fourteen days, and Křížek won his second Gold record. In the following years, Kreyson released the albums Křižáci, Elixír Života, and Zákon Džungle. Just like Anděl na útěku, Křižáci came out both in Czech and in English. In 1993, Křížek released another solo album, titled Klíč k mé duši, which received Diamond certification the following year for 400,000 copies sold. 1994 also saw the release of Best of Láďa Křížek, the artist's first compilation album. Towards the end of that year, Křížek sang a duet with Czech opera diva Eva Urbanová in a rock adaptation of The Phantom of the Opera. In 1995, Křížek was voted among the top three most popular singers in the nation. The same year, he sang the intro song to the cartoon O Malence, together with Slovak singer Dara Rolins. In 1996, Křížek issued the holiday album Kam hvězdy chodí spát, in collaboration with the Bambini di Praga youth choir. The album also included a duet with singer Karel Gott, on the song "Panis Angelicus".

=== Damiens and other projects ===
In 1997, Křížek recorded an album titled Všem Láskám with violinist Jaroslav Svěcený. At the end of the year, he launched the group Damiens with his brother Miroslav. In the fall of 1998, the duo released the single "Lásko měj se". The same year, Křížek sang a duet with Kateřina Brožová on Michal David's musical Kráska a zvíře. In March 1999, Damiens released their debut album, entitled Křídla, which won a Gold record. In October of that year, they iddued Křídla – Zlatý bonus, a re-release of Křídla that included bonus tracks. In the 1999 edition of Český slavík, the duo won the "Newcomer of the Year" award. On the occasion of Karel Gott's sixtieth birthday, Damiens performed his song "Adresát neznámý" at a concert hall in Prague. Křížek also sang Gott's hit "Paganini". At the end of 2000, Damiens were invited by Gott to host his concert tour České vánoce 2000. The same year, the duo released their second album, Svět zázraků, which again went Gold for the sale of 25,000 copies.

In the spring of 2001, Křížek recorded the album Síla návratů with Citron, a selection of hits he had sung with them in the past. Later that year, Damiens was again invited to play Karel Gott's Christmas tour. In 2002, they issued another record, Nechci zůstat sám, which once more went Gold.

Křížek's voice gained prominence in 2005, when he composed and sang the song "Země pohádek" as the theme of the advertising campaign for a children's online film store of the same name.

=== Return to Kreyson, Vitacit, and Citron ===
During 2006, Křížek, together with guitarist Radek "Reddy" Kroc, performed all over Czechia, playing acoustic arrangements of Vitacit, Citron, and Kreyson hits. In the middle of the year, Křížek resuscitated Kreyson, which had been on hiatus since 1996, and announced a contest to find new band members. A total of 90 experienced musicians took part, of which 37 were shortlisted. The final decision was made on 25 January 2007, and the band began to play again after eleven years of silence.

In May 2007, Křížek released the album Nejde vrátit čas?, a play on the 1990 Kreyson track "Nejde vrátit čas". The album was composed of acoustic recordings of Křížek's older songs with Kreyson, Citron, and Vitacit, with Radek Kroc on guitar. The same year, the live album Kreyson Live – Třinec 2007 was released. As a bonus, a duet with German singer Doro Pesch was added to the DVD edition. In July 2009, Kreyson released the compilation 20 Years of Kreyson. This album was created in cooperation with American independent label Retroactive Records. The same year, Křížek also began playing with Vitacit again, until 2015. During the summer of 2011, a new single was released by Kreyson, serving as a promo for the band's upcoming studio album, Návrat krále, which came out in 2013.

In 2015, 26 years after leaving Citron, Křížek rejoined the band. He made significant contributions to their new album, Rebelie rebelů. As of April 2020, he continued to tour with the band.

=== Kreyson MMXVII ===
In May 2017, after another hiatus since the release of Návrat krále, Křížek announced a new lineup for Kreyson, this time with international contributions from German guitarist Roland Grapow (Helloween, Masterplan) and American drummer Mike Terrana (Rage, Masterplan). The band began to play shows and festivals, and a new album was discussed. As of April 2023, no new material has been released.

== Discography ==
=== Vitacit ===
- Poslední Barča (live, 1987)

=== Citron ===
- Radegast (1987)
- Radegast (English version, 1987)
- Vypusťte psy! (demo, 1989)
- Síla návratů (2001)
- Rebelie Vol. 1 (EP, 2015)
- Rebelie Vol. 2 (EP, 2016)
- Rebelie rebelů (2016)

=== Kreyson ===
- Anděl na útěku (1990)
- Angel on the Run (1990)
- Křižáci (1992)
- Crusaders (1992)
- Elixír života (1993)
- Zákon džungle (1995)
- The Best of (compilation, 1996=)
- Kreyson Live – Třinec 2007 (live CD/DVD, 2007)
- 20 Years of Kreyson (compilation, 2009)
- Návrat krále (2013)

=== Damiens ===
- Křídla (1999)
- Křídla - Zlatý bonus (1999)
- Svět zázraků (2000)
- Nashledanou 2000 (EP, 2000)
- Svět zázraků - Nashledanou (compilation, 2000)
- Nechci zůstat sám (2002)
- Největší hity (compilation, 2003)

=== Solo ===
- Zlatej chlapec (1991)
- Klíč k mé duši (1993)
- Best of Láďa Křížek (1994)
- Kam hvězdy chodí spát (1995)
- Zlaté Hity (compilation, 1999)
- Nejde vrátit čas? (2007)

=== Other projects ===
- Všem Láskám (with Jaroslav Svěcený, 1997)
