= Guy Mann-Dude =

American musician

- Born: Guy Shiffman; United States
- Genres: Metal; rock
- Occupation: Musician
- Instruments: Guitar; drums; piano
- Years active: 1980s–present
- Formerly of: Michael Angelo Band, the Dudes of Wrath

Guy Mann-Dude is an American musician who was best known in the late 1980s and early 1990s after his eponymous band formed in Los Angeles, California, in 1988. He played guitar for the Michael Angelo Band before going solo and was part of the supergroup the Dudes of Wrath in 1989. He worked as a musician and producer in Czechoslovakia in the early 1990s, collaborating with Miloš "Dodo" Doležal on two albums.

== Biography ==
Born Guy Shiffman, he was a professional drummer for ten years before learning to play guitar. He toured with the lead singer of Yes, Jon Anderson, for his 1982 Animation Tour.

In 1989, he was part of the heavy metal supergroup the Dudes of Wrath, along with Paul Stanley of Kiss and Desmond Child, both on vocals, Vivian Campbell on guitar, Whitesnake's Rudy Sarzo on bass, and Mötley Crüe's Tommy Lee on drums. The group was specially assembled to record a song called "Shocker" from the film of the same name. Shiffman also worked as a studio guitarist and played on Robin Beck's album Trouble or Nothin' in 1989.

In the 1990s, Shiffman studied jazz and classical piano with Terry Trotter. He went on to score cartoons, movie shorts, and a film.

Shiffman met Czech guitarist Miloš "Dodo" Doležal in Los Angeles while the latter was studying there, and Doležal invited him to return to Czechoslovakia with him. Shiffman contributed to Doležal's second solo album, Dráždivý Dotek (1992), and in 1994, they recorded an album together, titled Miloš Dodo Doležal/Guy Mann-Dude, which included drums by session drummer Gregg Bissonette. Shiffman produced a few bands in the Eastern European nation, and his album Mannic Distortion was recorded and issued there.

== Discography ==
Studio albums

- Sleight of Hand (1989)
- Mannic Distortion (1991)

Other albums

- Miloš Dodo Doležal/Guy Mann-Dude (1994)

Notable contributions

- Alice Cooper – Trash (1989) tracks 2, 4, & 7
- Robin Beck – Trouble or Nothin' (1989)
- Miloš "Dodo" Doležal – Dráždivý Dotek (1992)
