= Vitacit =

Czech heavy metal band

- Origin: Roztoky, Prague, Czechoslovakia
- Genres: Heavy metal; hard rock
- Years active: 1973–present
- Members: Luděk Adámek; Honza Bouška; Petr Eda Kocour; Dan Horyna; Fany Stehlík; Honza Nezval
- Past members: Karel Adam; Jiří Voldřich; Jiří Kadlec; Ladislav Křížek; Miloš "Dodo" Doležal; Radek Kroc
- Website: vitacit.eu

Vitacit is a Czech hard rock/heavy metal band founded in Roztoky U Prahy, a town within the Prague district, in 1973.

== History ==
=== Early years: 1973–1985 ===
The formation of Vitacit began in 1973, under the name Smetiště, in Roztoky U Prahy. The founding members were Karel Adam on drums, Jiří Voldřich on bass, and Jiří Kadlec on guitar and vocals. The name Smetiště, meaning "junkyard", was unpopular, and the band eventually picked Vitacit, a popular brand of drink crystals, instead. During these early years, Vitacit saw limited success.

=== Halcyon days: 1985–1991 ===
The band underwent a number of lineup changes since their formation, and in 1985, they were joined by vocalist Ladislav Křížek (Kreyson, Citron) and guitarist Miloš "Dodo" Doležal. The duo led the band during the height of its popularity, co-writing some of its biggest hits. Křížek left in 1987, having only released the bootlegged live album Poslední Barča with the group. After the singer's departure, Doležal became the new frontman, taking over on vocal duties in addition to handling guitars. He helped record the debut Vitacit album, Vzhůru přes oceán, in 1990, before moving to the United States a year later, thus leaving the band without a vocalist and lead guitarist.

=== Doldrums and breakups: 1992–1998 ===
In 1992, Vitacit recorded their second album, Máte se hnout. Miloš Doležal returned in 1994 and the band recorded a new album, Navostro, the following year. They also opened for Iron Maiden during their October 1995 Prague concert, part of the band's X Factour with Blaze Bayley. 1996 saw the release of another album, titled Zaživa mrtví, which was recorded at Doležal's studio Hacienda in Žirovnice. The same year, Vitacit contributed a cover of Metallica's "Fight Fire with Fire" to the tribute album 10 Years After...A Tribute to Cliff Burton. In 1997, the group opened for Alice Cooper in the Czech Republic, and the following year, they disbanded.

=== Old friends return: 2009–present ===
In 2009, Ladislav Křížek brought Vitacit back together. He left again in 2015, however, returning to the band Citron, who had drawn him away from Vitacit once before, in 1987. In 2012, vocalist Dan Horyna, who had been active with the band from 1978 to 1985, rejoined the project. Fany Stehlík, another vocalist, who sang on the band's 1992 effort Máte se hnout, also returned. As of 2021, Vitacit is composed of Horyna and Stehlík, who share vocal duties; Honza Bouška and Petr Eda Kocour, both on guitar; Luděk Adámek on bass; and Honza Nezval on drums.

== Band members ==
Current

- Luděk Adámek – bass
- Honza Bouška – guitar
- Petr Eda Kocour – guitar
- Dan Horyna – vocals
- Fany Stehlík – vocals
- Honza Nezval – drums

Past

- Karel Adam – drums
- Jiří Voldřich – bass
- Jiří Kadlec – guitar, vocals
- Ladislav Křížek – vocals
- Miloš "Dodo" Doležal – guitar, vocals
- Radek "Reddy" Kroc – guitar

== Discography ==
Studio albums

- Vzhůru přes oceán (1990)
- Máte se hnout (1992)
- Navostro (1995)
- Zaživa mrtví (1996)
