= Arakain =

Czech heavy metal band

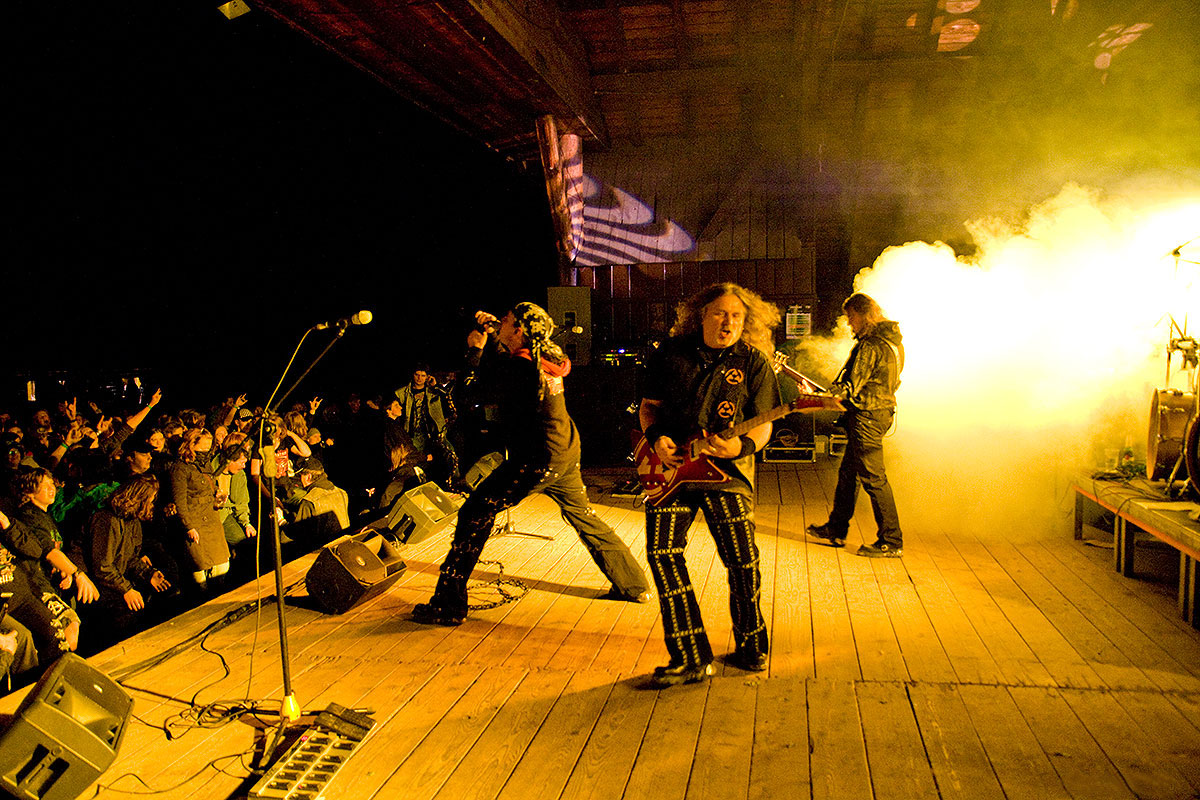
- Arakain in 2010

Background information
- Also known as: Áčka
- Origin: Prague, Czechoslovakia
- Genres: Heavy metal; thrash metal; power metal
- Years active: 1982–present
- Labels: Supraphon; Monitor; Popron; Sony BMG; 2P
- Members: Jan Toužimský; Jiří Urban; Miroslav Mach; Lukáš Doksanský; Zdeněk Kub
- Past members: Aleš Brichta; Lucie Bílá; Mirek Nedvěd; Rudolf Rožďalovský; Oldřich Maršík; Václav Ježek; Miloň Šterner; Marek Podskalský; Daniel Krob; Robert Vondrovic; Štěpán Smetáček; Marek Žežulka; Petr Kolář; Roman Lomtadze; Karel Jenčík
- Website: arakain.eu

Arakain is a Czech heavy metal band founded in Prague in 1982 by former members of the band Apad, whose vocalist, Aleš Brichta, became the frontman of the new project and remained with the band until 2002. The other founding members were guitarist Jiří Urban and drummer Miroslav Nedvěd. After Brichta's departure, Petr Kolář took over vocal duties, and was in turn replaced by Jan Toužimský in 2005. The band's lineup has changed multiple times since its inception, and the only remaining original member is guitarist Jiří Urban. Arakain are considered to be one of the most influential Czech metal bands.

== History ==
=== Beginnings ===
1982–1984

Arakain's origins date to the spring of 1982, when future vocalist Aleš Brichta, guitarist Jiří Urban, and drummer Miroslav Nedvěd left the band Apad. They were later joined by experienced guitarist Rudolf Rožďálovsky and bassist Oldřich Maršík. The band members were all influenced by new wave of British heavy metal bands such as Iron Maiden, Judas Priest, and Saxon, and this permeated their early sound. They began by playing small events, including dance shows, but due to the communist regime in Czechoslovakia, which imposed heavy censorship on artistic expression, they were banned from playing in commercial media and struggled to get serious gigs until the mid 1980s.

1984–1988

In 1984, there was a lineup change as Urban and Maršík left and were replaced by Miloň Šterner and Václav Ježek respectively. Arakain's sound began to change as well, acquiring traits of such bands as Venom and Slayer. In 1985, Marek Podskalský took over on guitar duties from Šterner. Lucie Bílá, who went on to become one of the most successful Czech singers in the 1990s and later, occasionally sang with the band during those early years. In 1986, Nedvěd was replaced on drums by Karel Jenčík, the bass passed from Václav Ježek to Zdeněk Kub, and Miroslav Mach took over on guitar from Marek Podskalský.

During this period, Arakain began recording for the first time. In 1987, they sold out Prague's Lucerna hall and their debut single "Excalibur/Gladiátor" was published by Panton Records in March 1988. On 31 January 1988, the band celebrated their five-year anniversary at Lucerna. All the original members and a few related bands (Sapon, Vilda Čok) performed at the show. In the spring of the same year, Robert Vondrovic, whose skills were more technical than Karel Jenčík's, took over on drums and introduced a thrash metal flavour to the band's sound.

=== Success ===
1988–1989

In the spring of 1989, Arakain released their second single, titled "Proč?/Amadeus", and performed at rock festivals in Czechoslovakia, the Soviet Union, and Poland. In the same year, Daniel Krob briefly replaced Miroslav Mach on guitar, before joining Kreyson a few months later, upon which Mach returned. Drummer Vondrovic left the band and was replaced by Štěpán Smetáček. The band also created their first music videos around this time.

1990–1995

With the collapse of communism in Czechoslovakia in 1989, Arakain began building a reputation for themselves as their freedom to perform without censorship increased. In the beginning of 1990, their third single, "Ku-Klux-Klan/Orion", was released, followed shortly after by their debut album, Thrash The Trash. A second record followed in 1991, titled Schizofrenie. Marek Žežulka took over on drums the same year.

In 1992, Arakain held a concert at Lucerna for their 10th anniversary, and in the same year, they released their third studio album, Black Jack, as well as the live record History – Live. The following year, the by-now prolific band issued their next album, Salto Mortale. 1994 saw the release of the English version of Thrash The Trash, titled simply Thrash!. A covers album, Legendy, followed in 1995, garnering the band a Gold Record for over 30,000 copies sold. This was followed by a new contract with Popron records and a successful tour of the Czech Republic and Slovakia.

1996–1999

In 1996, Arakain released the album S.O.S. They celebrated their 15th anniversary in 1997 and released two compilation albums: 15 Vol. 1 and 15 Vol. 2. In 1998, they issued Apage Satanas, one of their most acclaimed records to date. This was followed by Farao, their eighth studio release, in 1999.

2000–2010

In the spring of 2000, Arakain issued the double album Gambrinus Live. This was followed in 2001 by Forrest Gump and in 2002 by Archeology, their ninth and tenth studio albums, respectively. Archeology was the last recording with Aleš Brichta on vocals, as the singer parted ways with the band that same year. On 15 May 2002, a large concert was held at Lucerna to mark the band's 20th anniversary. This was their final concert with Brichta as well as the last time Arakain played with more than one original member. After a short time, Petr Kolář was selected as the band's new vocalist. He sang on Arakain's eleventh's studio release, Metalmorfoza, which came out in 2003. Warning! came out in 2005 and went Gold - the fourth time Arakain had won this distinction. Kolář left at this point, having recorded two albums with Arakain. He was replaced by Jan Toužimský. Marek Žežulka also left the band and went on to join Divokej Bill. Lukáš "Doxa" Doksanský took on the role of drummer. Toužimský's first recording with Arakain was the 2006 release Labyrint. Their next album, Restart, was released in the spring of 2009 and was also certified Gold.

2011–present

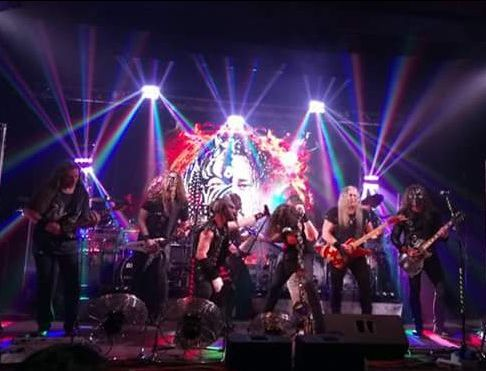
Arakain and Dymytry performing in Bezno, 2016

Homo Sapiens..? was released on 1 March 2011. In 2012, Arakain celebrated 30 years of uninterrupted existence and went on their XXX Best of Tour 2012, joined by Lucie Bílá, after which they released the live DVDs Arakain & Lucie Bílá - XXX Music City / Open Air and Arakain, Lucie Bílá, Petr Kolář – XXX – Praha PVA Expo. Simultaneously as this tour, the band conducted the Arakain Memorial tour, in order to celebrate Aleš Brichta, during which they gave their previous band members the opportunity to join them onstage.

Adrenalinum, Arakain's 17th studio album, was released in 2014. Together with the band Dymytry, led by Jiří Urban Jr., son of Arakain's long-time guitarist, they conducted a spring and autumn tour called Arakain Dymytry Tour 2014. The successful joint effort was repeated two years later as Arakain Dymytry Tour 2016.

Arakain released their 17th studio album, Arakadabra, in 2016, and their 18th record, Jekyll & Hyde, came out in 2019.

== Band members ==
Current

- Jan Toužimský – vocals
- Jiří Urban – rhythm guitar
- Miroslav Mach – lead guitar
- Lukáš Doksanský – drums
- Zdeněk Kub – bass

Past

- Aleš Brichta – vocals
- Lucie Bílá – vocals
- Mirek Nedvěd – drums
- Rudolf Rožďalovský – lead guitar
- Oldřich Maršík – bass
- Václav Ježek – bass
- Miloň Šterner – lead guitar
- Marek Podskalský – lead guitar
- Daniel Krob – lead guitar
- Robert Vondrovic – drums
- Štěpán Smetáček – drums
- Marek Žežulka – drums
- Petr Kolář – vocals
- Karel Jenčík – drums

== Discography ==
Studio albums

- Thrash the Trash (1990)
- Schizofrenie (1991)
- Black Jack (1992)
- Salto Mortale (1993)
- Thrash! (1994)
- Legendy (1995)
- S.O.S. (1996)
- Apage Satanas (1998)
- Farao (1999)
- Forrest Gump (2001)
- Archeology (2002)
- Metalmorfoza (2003)
- Warning! (2005)
- Labyrint (2006)
- Restart (2009)
- Homo Sapiens..? (2011)
- Adrenalinum (2014)
- Arakadabra
- Jekyll & Hyde (2019)

Compilations

- Dej mi víc... Olympic (1992)
- 15 Vol. 1 (1997)
- 15 Vol. 2 (1997)
- 15 Vol. 1&2 (1998)
- Balady (2003)
- Největší hity/Balady (2004)
- Gold (2004)

Live albums

- History Live (1992)
- Gambrinus Live (2000)
- XXV Eden (2007)
- Arakain/Dymytry Tour 2014 (2014)
- Arakain/Dymytry – Live 2016 (2016)
- 40 – O2 Universum (2024)

Singles

- "Excalibur/Gladiátor" (1988)
- "Proč?/Amadeus" (1989)
- "Ku-Klux-Klan/Orion" (1989)
- "Schizofrenie/Iluzorium" (1991)

DVDs

- 15 (1997)
- Gambrinus Live (2000)
- 20 let natvrdo (2003)
- XXV Eden (2007)
- Arakain & Lucie Bílá – XXX Music City/Open Air (2012)
- Arakain, Lucie Bílá, Petr Kolář – XXX – Praha PVA Expo (2013)
- Arakain/Dymytry Tour 2014 (2014)
- Arakain/Dymytry – Live 2016 (2016)
