= Tomáš Štítný of Štítný =

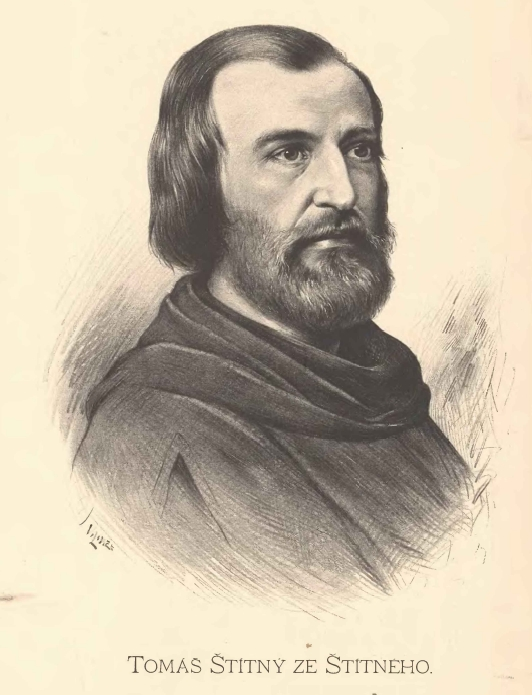
Tomáš Štítný ze Štítného

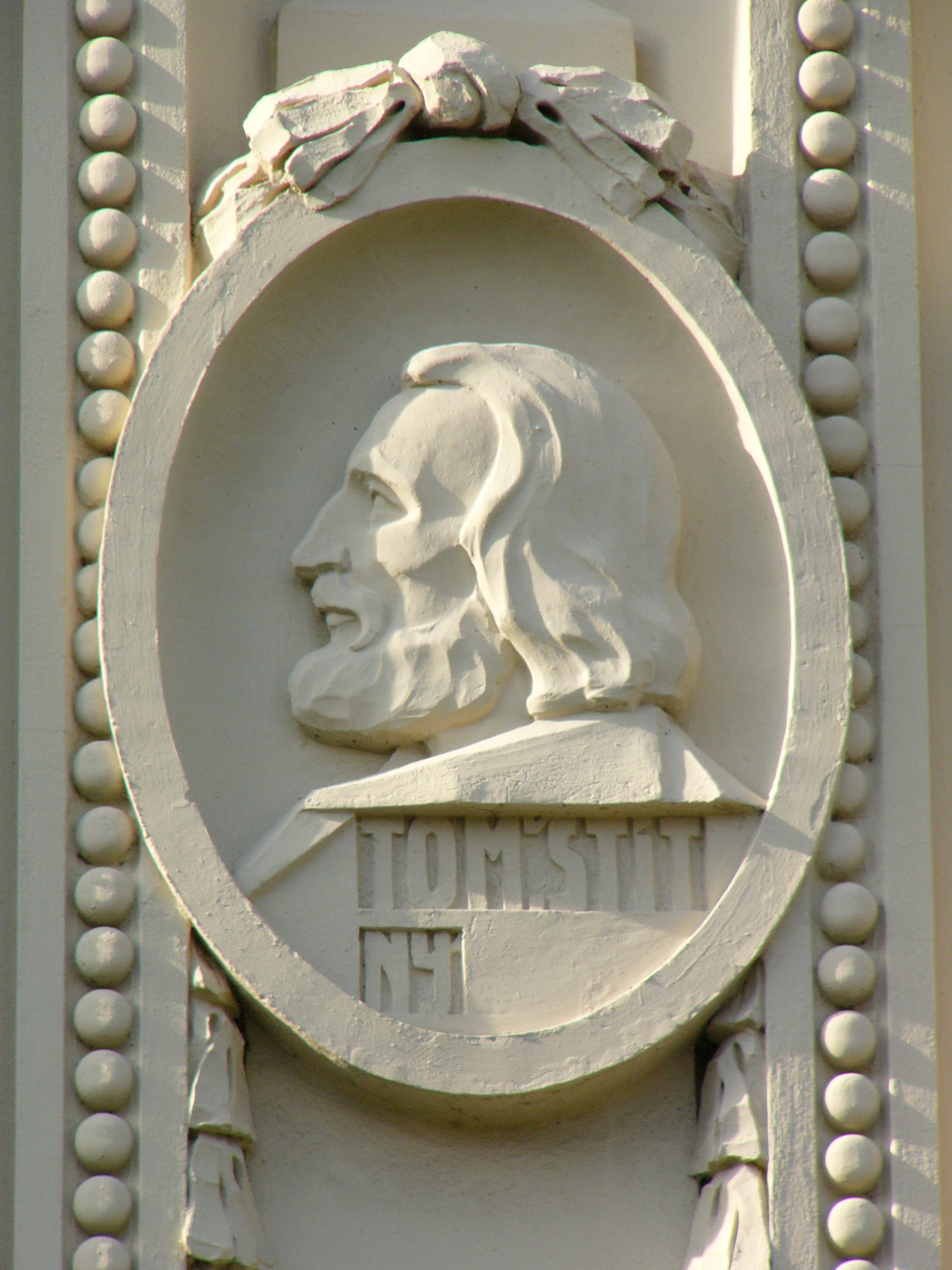
Relief of Tomáš Štítný ze Štítného in Prostějov

Tomáš Štítný of Štítný (Czech: Tomáš Štítný ze Štítného; c. 1333 – 1401/1409) was a Czech nobleman, writer, theologian, translator and Christian preacher.

== Life ==
Tomáš Štítný came from a lower nobility from the Štítná fortress (today part of Žirovnice, Czech Republic). He was one of the leading figures of the early Czech Reformation, writing and translating Christian tracts for the benefit of the nobility, to assist in wise governance. The Klementinum Codex, a major work, is a collection of some of the essentials necessary for Christian practice and the needs of daily life. He also wrote parables for ordinary people and works purely for entertainment. There is a bronze bust of Tomas Štítný in the pantheon of the National Museum in Prague.
