= Žirovnice =

- Town
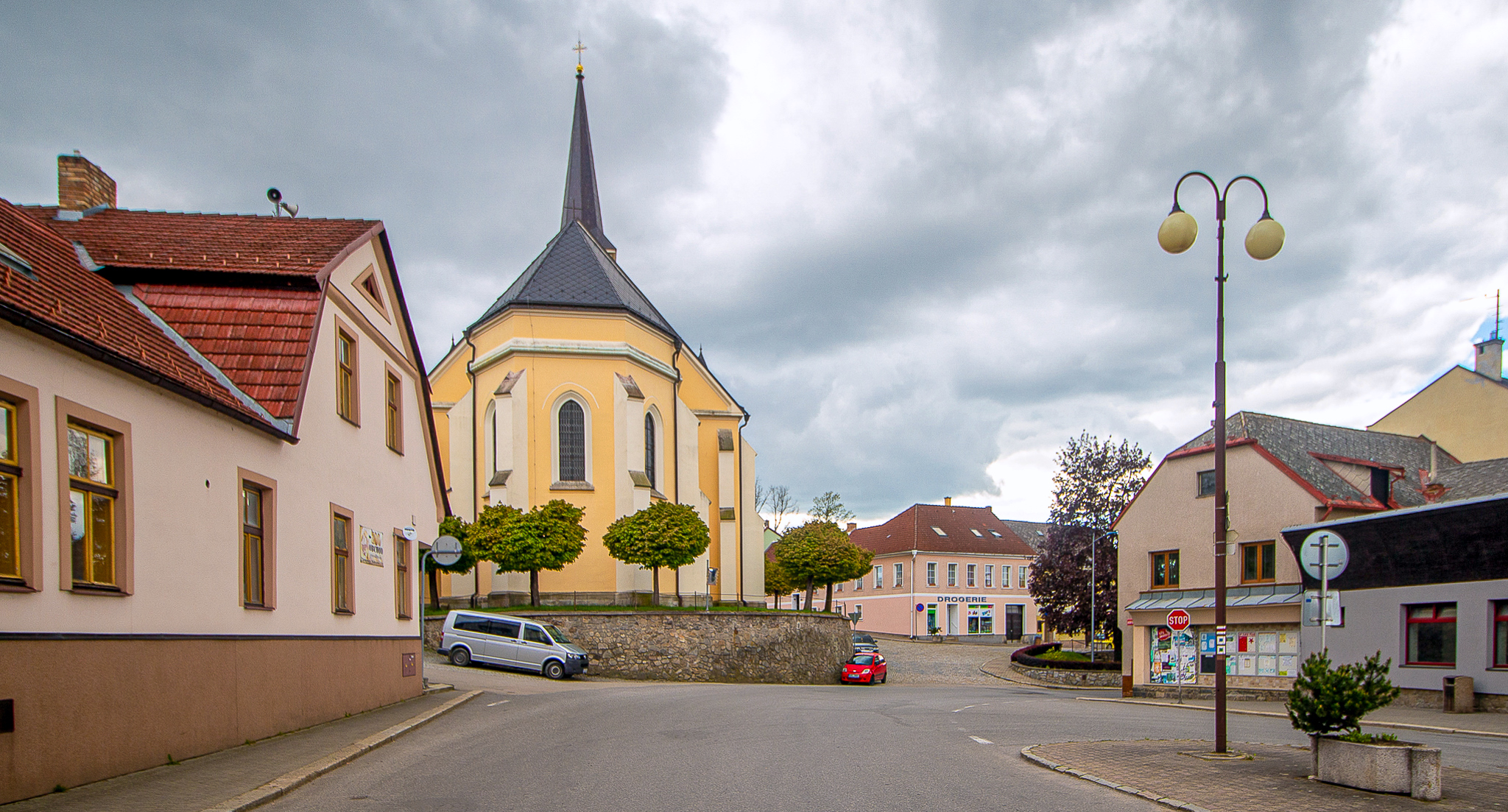
- Centre of Žirovnice

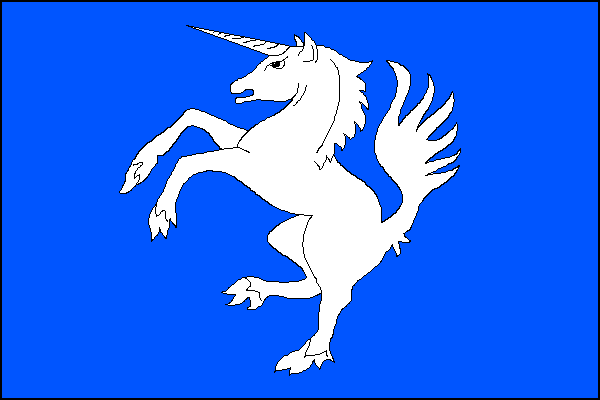
- Flag Coat of arms

- Location in the Czech Republic
- Coordinates: 49°15′12″N 15°11′18″E
- Country: Czech Republic
- Region: Vysočina
- District: Pelhřimov
- First mentioned: 1358

Government
  - Mayor: Radek Vopravil

Area
  - Total: 44.42 km^{2} (17.15 sq mi)
- Elevation: 565 m (1,854 ft)

Population (2026-01-01)
  - Total: 3,135
  - Density: 70.58/km^{2} (182.8/sq mi)
- Time zone: UTC+1 (CET)
  - Summer (DST): UTC+2 (CEST)
- Postal code: 394 68
- Website: www.zirovnice.cz

Žirovnice (Czech pronunciation: [ˈʒɪrovɲɪtsɛ]; German: Serownitz) is a town in Pelhřimov District in the Vysočina Region of the Czech Republic. It has about 3,100 inhabitants. The town is located on the Žirovnička Stream in the Křemešník Highlands. The main landmarks of the town are the Žirovnice Castle and the Church of Saints Philip and James.

== Administrative division ==
Žirovnice consists of six municipal parts (in brackets population according to the 2021 census):

- Žirovnice (2,348)
- Cholunná (45)
- Litkovice (45)
- Stranná (90)
- Štítné (133)
- Vlčetín (100)

== Geography ==
Žirovnice is located about 19 kilometres (12 mi) south of Pelhřimov and 32 km (20 mi) southwest of Jihlava. It lies in the Křemešník Highlands. The highest point is at 648 m (2,126 ft) above sea level. The Žirovnička Stream flows through the town. The area is rich in small fishponds.

== History ==
The town was built around a castle of the same name. The first written mention of Žirovnice is from 1358.

== Demographics ==
Historical population

Year	Pop.	±%
1869	3,200	—
1880	3,503	+9.5%
1890	3,936	+12.4%
1900	3,908	−0.7%
1910	4,530	+15.9%

Year	Pop.	±%
1921	4,349	−4.0%
1930	4,231	−2.7%
1950	3,354	−20.7%
1961	3,298	−1.7%
1970	3,282	−0.5%

Year	Pop.	±%
1980	3,384	+3.1%
1991	3,127	−7.6%
2001	3,056	−2.3%
2011	2,874	−6.0%
2021	2,761	−3.9%

Source: Censuses

== Economy ==
Žirovnice was traditionally town of weavers, but in 1863, manufacturing of buttons from nacre was introduced. In the 1940s, nearly 100 nacre-processing manufactures existed in the small town. After Communists seized power in 1948, these manufactures were nationalised and transformed into one company, which still exists.

== Transport ==
The railway line from Brno to Plzeň briefly passes through the municipal territory. The train station called Počátky-Žirovnice, which serves Žirovnice, is located in neighbouring Stojčín.

== Sights ==
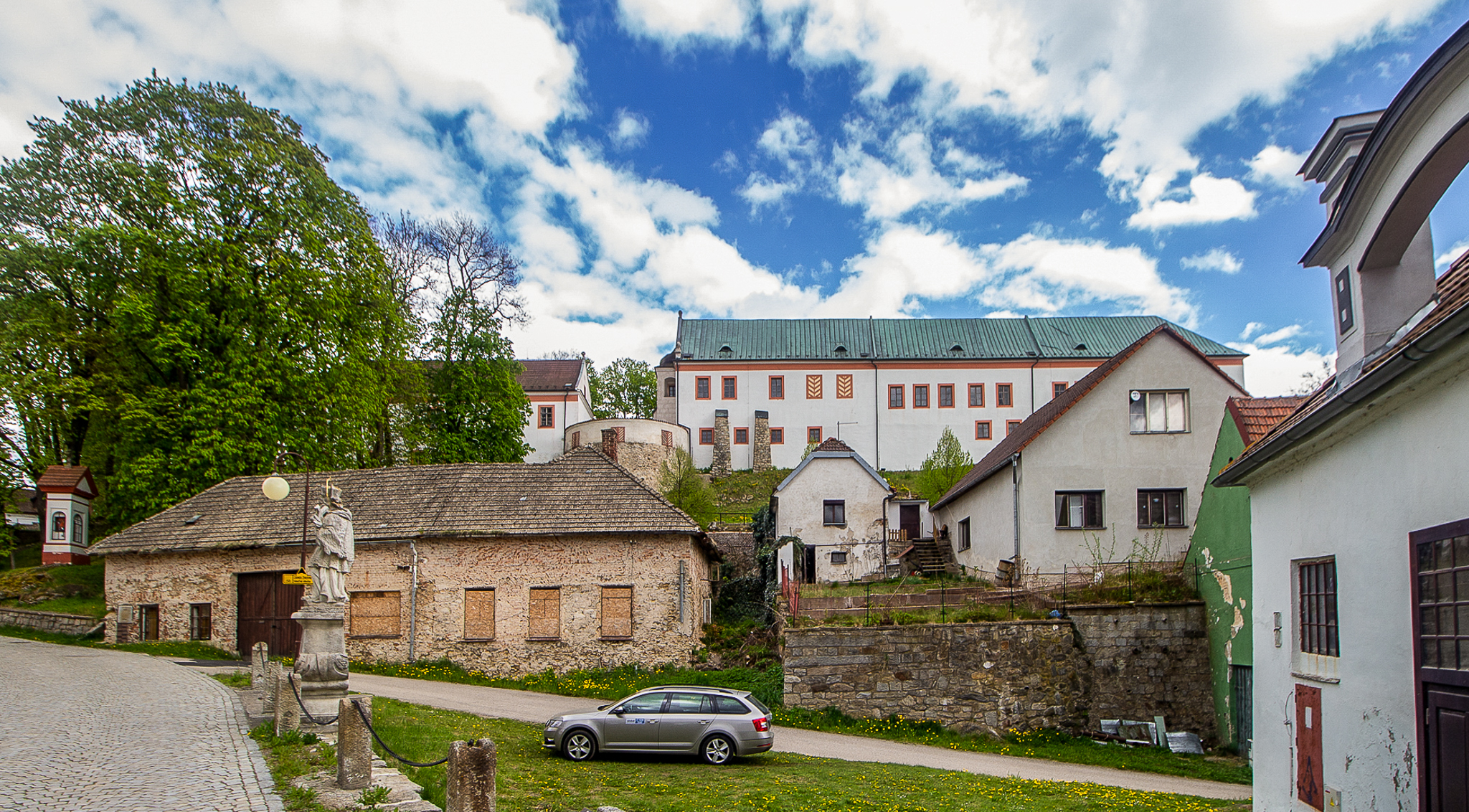
View towards the Žirovnice Castle

Among the main landmarks of the town are the castle and the church. The Žirovnice Castle was originally a medieval castle, rebuilt into a Renaissance aristocratic residence. The frescoes with which it is decorated are considered the most extensive in the country. In the castle there is a museum of button-manufacturing and nacre-processing.

The Church of Saints Philip and James was built in the pseudo-Gothic style in 1868–1871. It replaced an old Gothic church from the 18th century, which has insufficient capacity and was demolished in 1868. A wooden statue of Pietà and a Gothic baptismal font have been preserved from the original church.

The Church of Saint Giles is a simple cemetery church. It was built in the Baroque style in 1700, but the remains of an older late Gothic church are incorporated into it.

The Church of Saint Bartholomew is located in Stranná. It is a Neoclassical building with a Gothic core.

== Notable people ==
- Tomáš Štítný of Štítný (c. 1333 – 1401/1409), nobleman, writer and theologian
- Iva Janžurová (born 1941), actress

== Twin towns – sister cities ==
Žirovnice is twinned with:

- Grosshöchstetten, Switzerland
- Trstená, Slovakia
