= Stojčín =

- Municipality
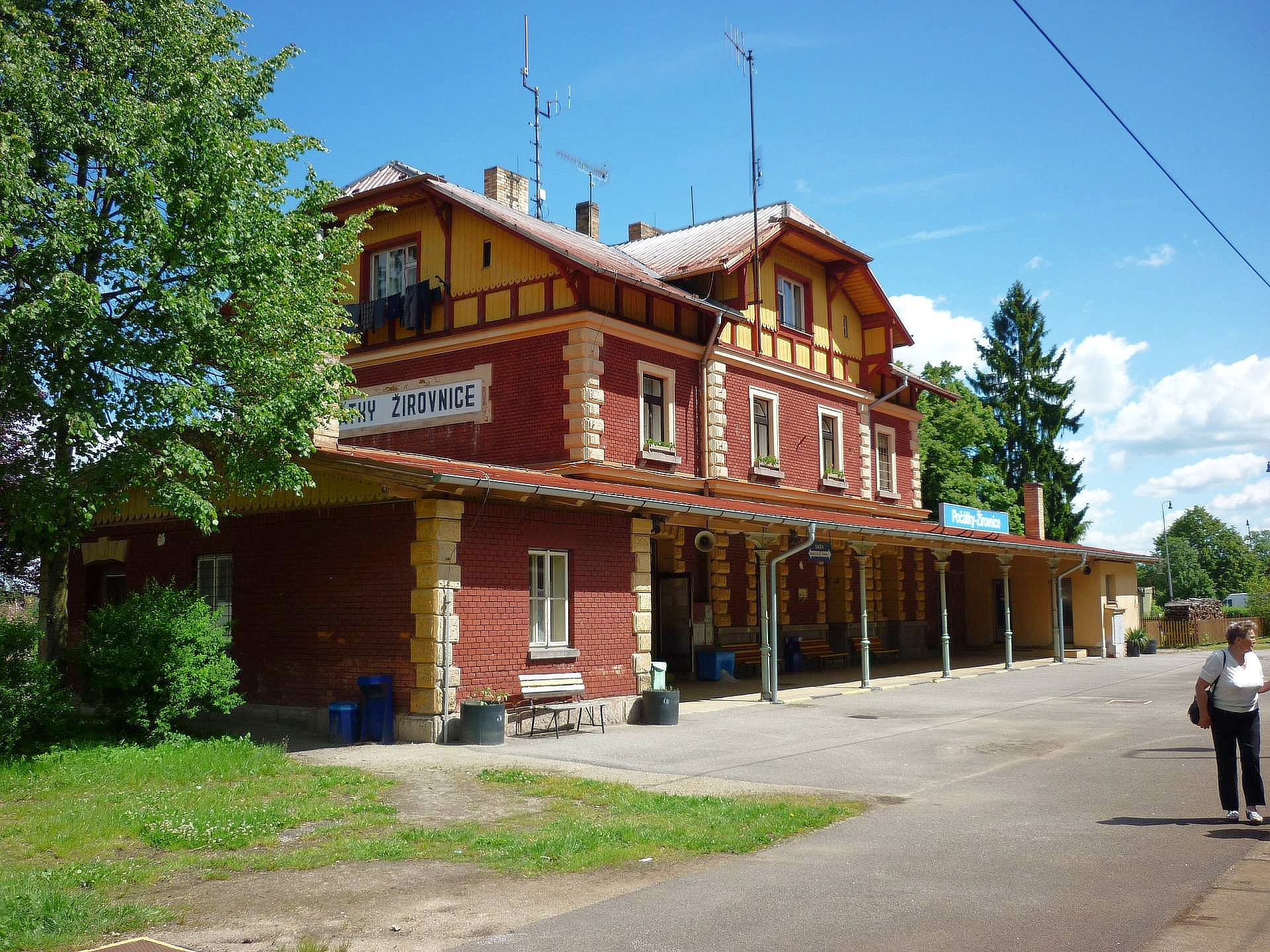
- Train station

- Location in the Czech Republic
- Coordinates: 49°14′16″N 15°13′19″E
- Country: Czech Republic
- Region: Vysočina
- District: Pelhřimov
- First mentioned: 1365

Area
  - Total: 3.87 km^{2} (1.49 sq mi)
- Elevation: 624 m (2,047 ft)

Population (2026-01-01)
  - Total: 104
  - Density: 26.9/km^{2} (69.6/sq mi)
- Time zone: UTC+1 (CET)
  - Summer (DST): UTC+2 (CEST)
- Postal code: 394 68
- Website: www.stojcin.cz

Stojčín is a municipality and village in Pelhřimov District in the Vysočina Region of the Czech Republic. It has about 100 inhabitants.

Stojčín lies approximately 22 kilometres (14 mi) south of Pelhřimov, 33 km (21 mi) south-west of Jihlava, and 111 km (69 mi) south-east of Prague.

== Demographics ==
Historical population
Year	Pop.	±%
1869	115	—
1880	119	+3.5%
1890	196	+64.7%
1900	234	+19.4%
1910	266	+13.7%
1921	287	+7.9%
1930	290	+1.0%
1950	225	−22.4%
1961	211	−6.2%
1970	189	−10.4%
1980	154	−18.5%
1991	121	−21.4%
2001	125	+3.3%
2011	124	−0.8%
2021	107	−13.7%
Source: Censuses

== Transport ==
The railway line from Brno to Plzeň goes through Stojčín. The local station is called Počátky-Žirovnice.
