= Jiří Schelinger =

Czech musician (1951–1981)

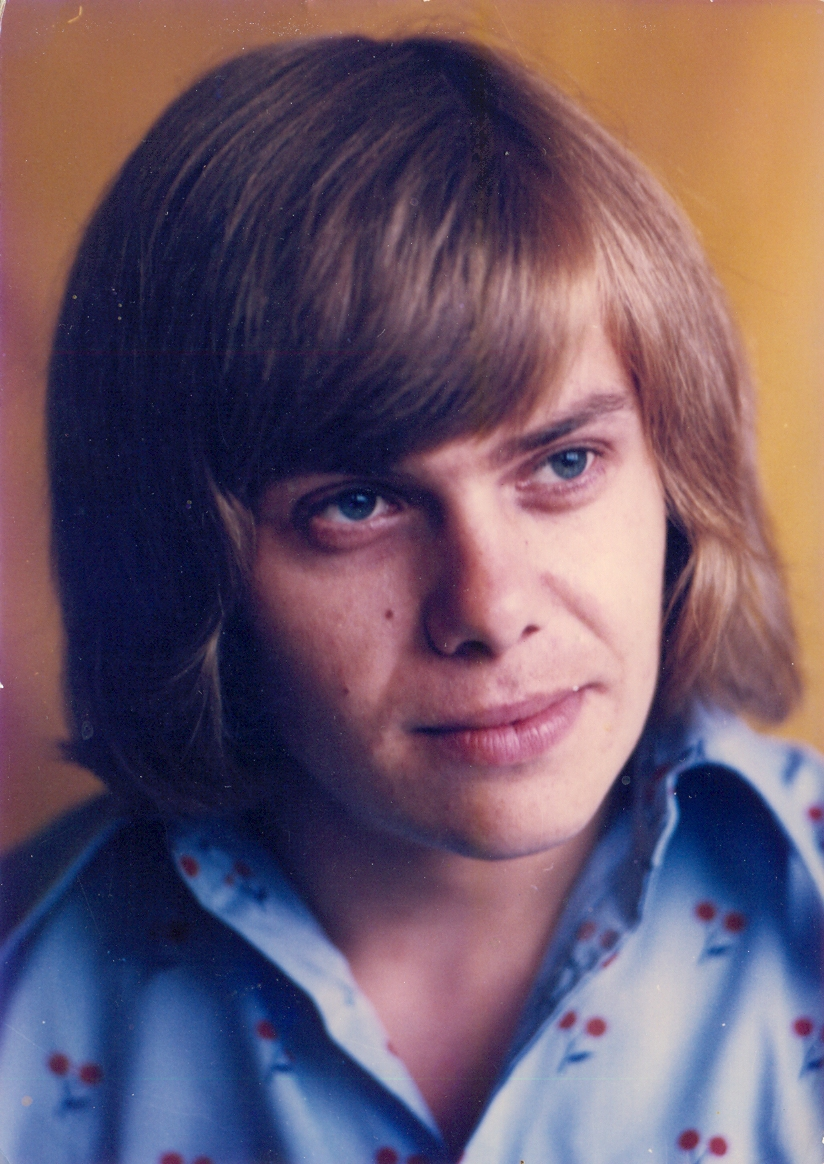
- Schelinger in 1977

Background information
- Born: 6 March 1951; Bousov, Czechoslovakia
- Died: 13 April 1981 (aged 30); Bratislava, Czechoslovakia
- Genres: Pop rock; hard rock
- Occupation: Musician
- Instruments: Vocals; guitar; piano
- Years active: 1973–1981
- Labels: Supraphon

Jiří Schelinger (6 March 1951 – 13 April 1981) was a Czech rock singer and guitarist considered to have been the first Czech hard rocker and an influential musician to this day.

== Biography ==
Schelinger was born in the village of Bousov in 1951. His father, Josef (1921–1995), was a well-known concert guitarist and guitar teacher, and his mother, Miloslava (1929–2007), worked as a florist. He had a younger brother, Milan Schelinger, who was also a musician. As a child, Schelinger played piano, and later guitar. His first band, in which he played while still in elementary school, was called Nothing But Nothing and in later years, he played in various other groups, including Smaragd, The Happy Five, and Faraon, with whom he recorded his first big hit, the 1972 song "Holubí dům", penned by Jaroslav Uhlíř and Zdeněk Svěrák. In 1973, he joined the band of František Ringo Čech, with whom he recorded six studio albums. Work on a seventh album, titled Zemětřesení, began in 1979, but it was never completed as Schelinger died two years later. A project of the same name, commemorating Schelinger's musical oeuvre, was put together in 1993 by Miloš "Dodo" Doležal, Aleš Brichta, Vlasta Henych, and Štěpán Smetáček.

In 1981, after drinking all night with local musicians and artists after a concert, Schelinger accepted a bet to jump from Red Army Bridge (now Starý most) in Bratislava into the Danube river, and never resurfaced. His partially decomposed body was found a month later. He was inducted into the Beatová síň slávy in 2004.

On the sixtieth anniversary of Schelinger's birth (and nearly 30 years after his death), in March 2011, at the house in Prague where he lived during his early childhood, a bust with a memorial plaque was unveiled to commemorate the beloved musician.

Schelinger is buried at Olšany Cemetery in Prague.

== Speculations about death ==
Schelinger's cause of death was never solved, and it fueled various speculations, including that he was murdered by State Security, that he attempted to emigrate illegally, wished to disappear from public life, or that he had committed suicide. There were also rumors that the former State Security tried to solve the case quickly and that the body on which the autopsy was performed was not Schelinger's. The identity of the body was never confirmed by any of the singer's family members or acquaintances. The conclusion that it was in fact the celebrity was made based on dental records. Schelinger's brother Milan has also claimed that his brother's body was actually found on the shore of the Danube river in Hungary, where he was buried in an unmarked grave.

== Discography ==
with František Ringo Čech

- Báječní muži (1975)
- Ovoce z naší zahrádky (1975)
- Nemám hlas jako zvon (1975)
- Schelinger a Rezek se skupinou F. R. Čecha (1976)
- Hrrrr na ně (1977)
- Nám se líbí… (1979)

== Gallery ==
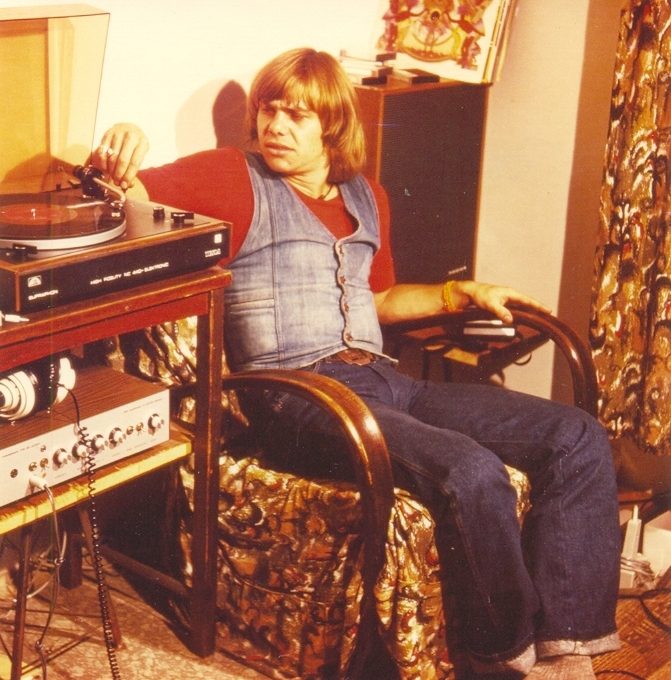
At home in Nusle

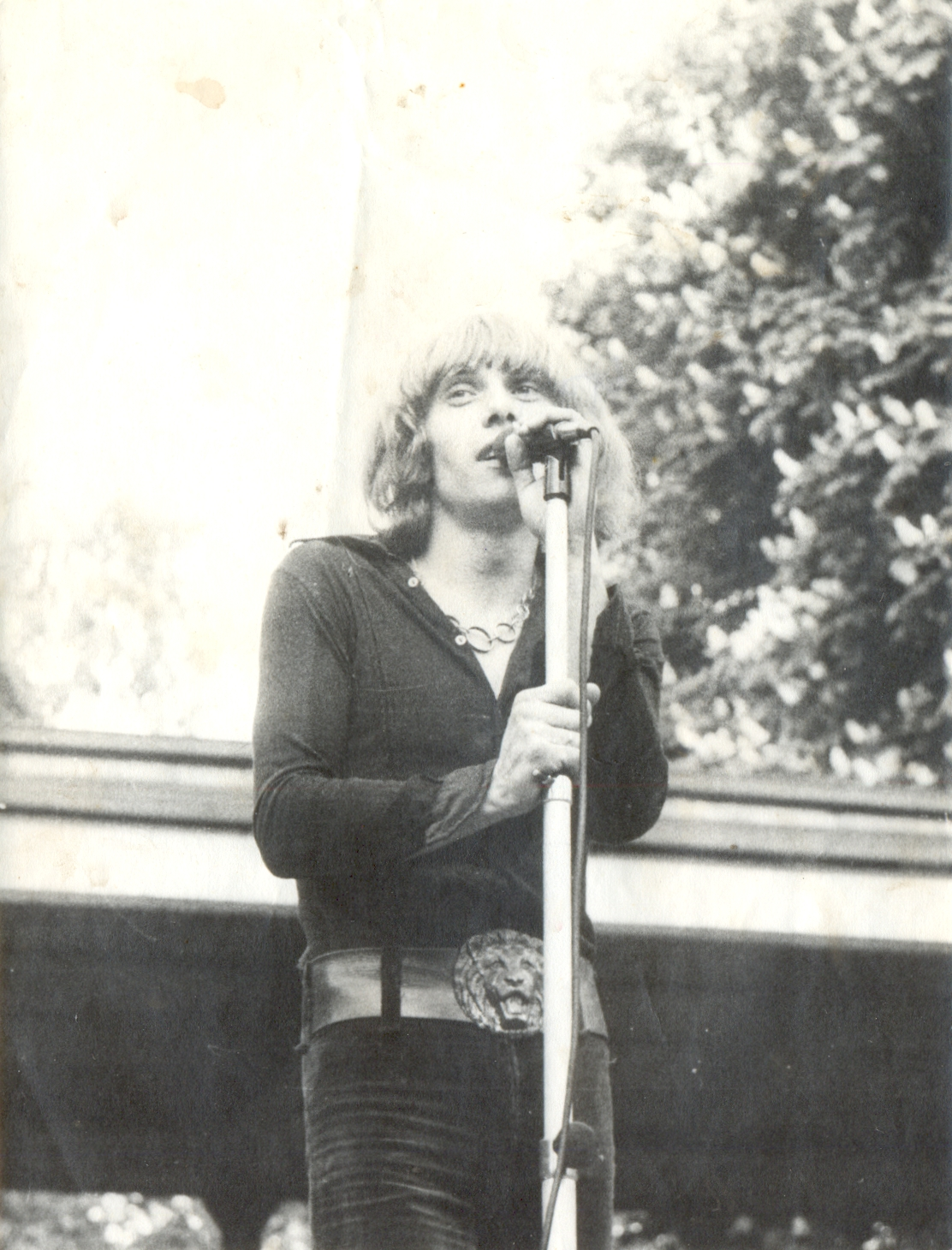
Performing in 1979

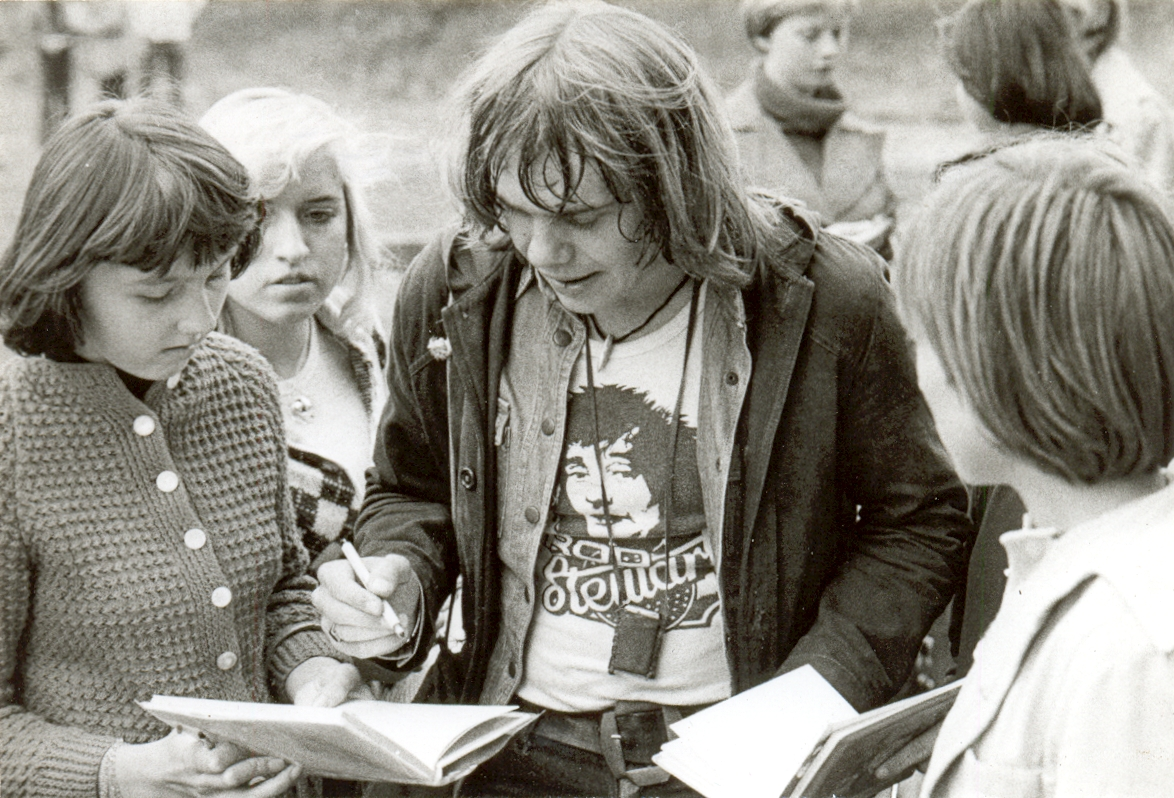
Signing autographs after a concert

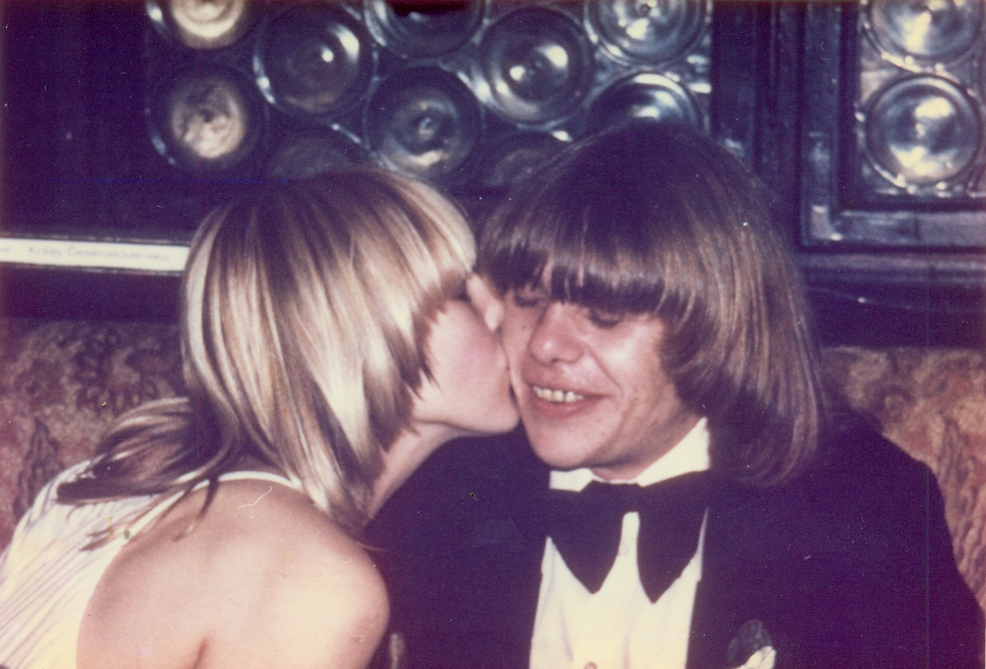
With second wife, Jitka Poledňáková, during their wedding in 1977

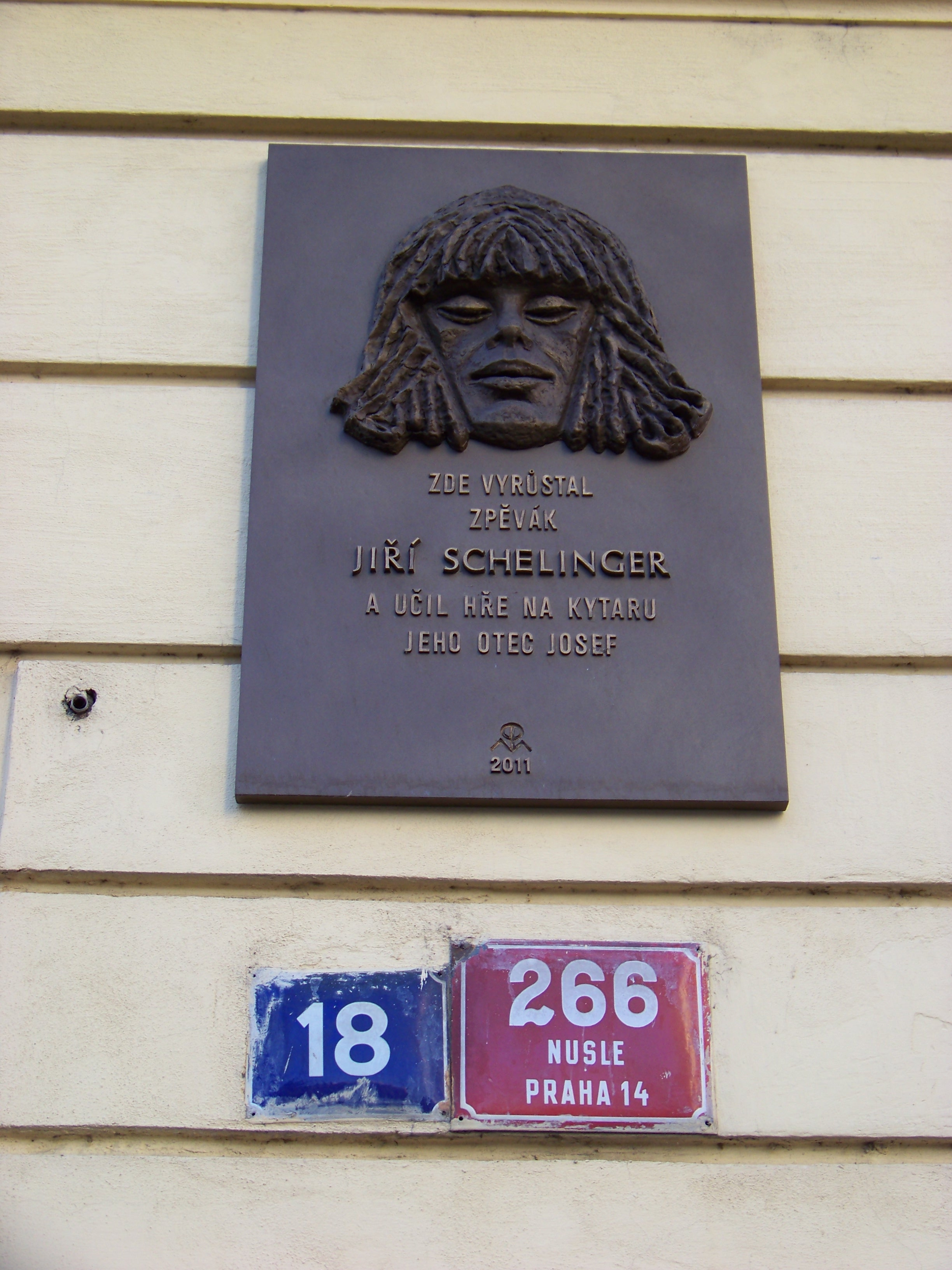
Bust of Jiří Schelinger in Nusle

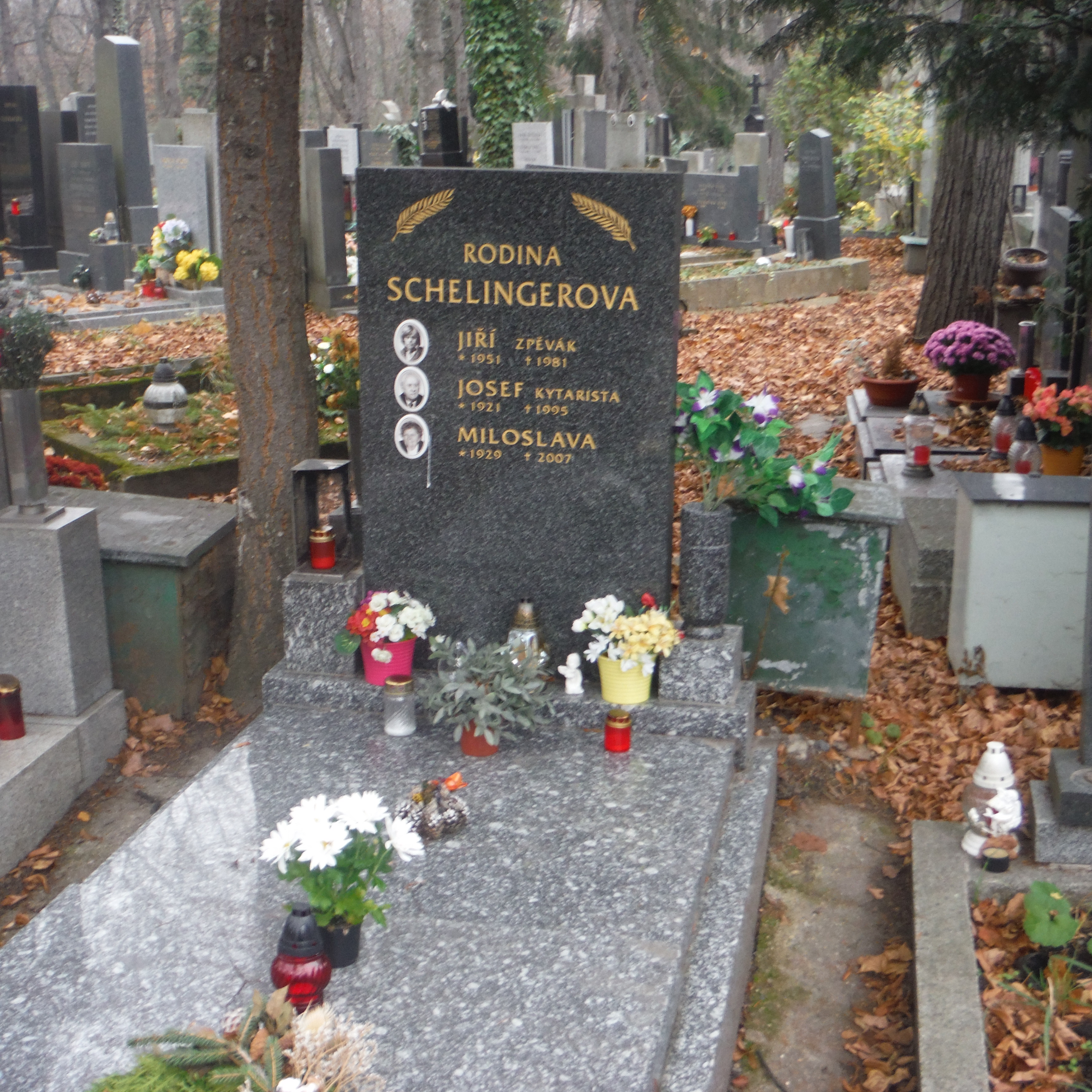
Grave of the Schelinger family in Prague
