= Petr Kolář (singer) =

Czech singer

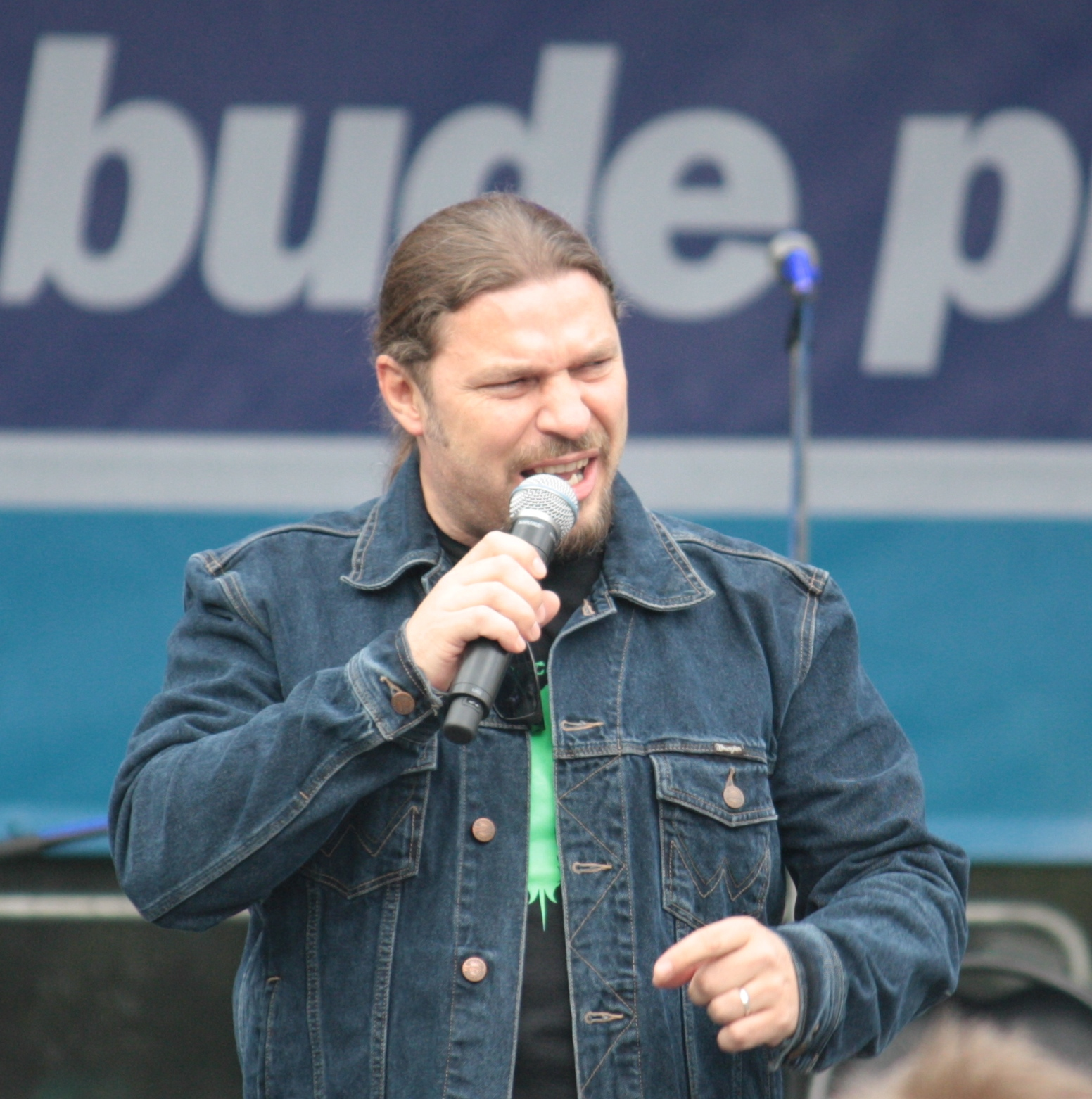
- Petr Kolář in Prague, 2010

Background information
- Born: 20 June 1967 (age 59); České Budějovice, Czechoslovakia
- Genres: Pop, rock
- Occupation: Singer
- Website: petrkolar.cz

Petr Kolář (born 20 June 1967) is a Czech singer. Born in České Budějovice, he was a member of Martin Němec's band Precedens in the late 1990s. From 2002 to 2005, Kolář was a member of the rock band Arakain. He released his first solo album Mackie Messer in 1999 and has collaborated with many other musicians, including Iveta Bartošová, Michael Kocáb, Michal David and Daniel Landa. Kolář also sang in many musicals.

== Discography ==
- Mackie Messer (1999)
- Album (2005)
- V Lucerně (2006)
- Bez křídel (2007)
- Akusticky v Karlíně (2009)
- Čas nás naučí (2011)
- Na Žofíně (2014)
