= Kreyson =

Czech heavy metal band

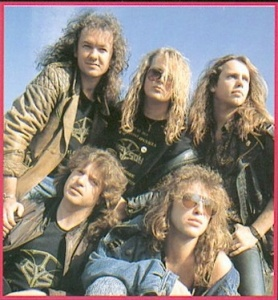
- Kreyson in 1990

Background information
- Origin: Prague, Czechoslovakia
- Genres: Heavy metal; power metal; Christian metal; hard rock
- Years active: 1989–present
- Spinoffs: Kreyson Memorial
- Members: Ladislav Křížek; Mike Terrana; Michal Kůs; Jiří "George" Rain
- Past members: Jaroslav Bartoň; Daniel Krob; Karel Adam; Luděk Adámek; Vítek Fiala; Robert Vondrovic; Daniel Hafstein; Daniel Šůra; Karel Schurrer; Libor Matejčík; Petr Henych; Radek Kroc; Honza Kirk Běhunek; Zdenek Pradlovský; Peter Boška; Michal Daněk; Roland Grapow
- Website: ladakrizek.com

Kreyson is a Czech metal band founded in Prague in 1989 by Ladislav Křížek (Vitacit, Citron, Damiens) after leaving the band Citron. He was joined by Jaroslav Bartoň, also from Citron, Daniel Krob (Arakain), Robert Vondrovic (Arakain), and Karel Adam (Moped).

== Beginnings ==
In 1990, Kreyson recorded their debut album Anděl na útěku (Angel on the run) in a studio in Hanover with producer Jan Němec. Its initial pressing of 45,000 copies sold out within three days. The album went gold after selling 150,000 copies and eventually sold over a quarter of a million copies. Three singles were released off the album: "Vzdálená" (Far away, or "Faraway" on the English version), "Čarovná noc" (Magical night, or "Deep in the Night" on the English version), and "Nejde vrátit čas" (Can't turn back time, or "I Need You" on the English version), all of which were successful in the charts. An English version of the album, titled Angel on the Run, came out the same year. Upon the success of Kreyson's first album, Ladislav Křížek released his first solo record, titled Zlatej chlapec (Golden boy), in 1991. The rest of the band accompanied him on this record as well, though by this point Robert Vondrovic had been replaced by Daniel Hafstein (Motorband) and Libor Matejčík (Motorband) took over guitar duties from Daniel Krob a year later.

== Subsequent albums and hiatus ==
In 1992, Kreyson released their second studio album, titled Křižáci (Crusaders). The record saw a shift towards faster, more speed metal-oriented tracks. As with Angel on the Run, an English version of this album was released, titled Crusaders. This album also attained gold status.

1993 saw the release of Křížek's second solo album, Klíč k mé duši (Key to my soul), and Kreyson's third studio album, Elixír života (Elixir of life). This record did not prove to be as successful as the band's previous two efforts, though it did not sell poorly either. Jaroslav Bartoň played only a few solos on the album, and the majority of the guitar tracks were recorded by Petr Henych.

The band's next effort, Zákon džungle (Law of the jungle) was released in 1995, though by this point they were no longer signed to Tommü Records, which had released their previous albums. A follow-up album was planned, but it never materialized and the band subsequently went on a 10-year hiatus after issuing a compilation album titled The best of, in 1996.

== Return ==
During this time, Ladislav Křížek continued touring, working on solo material, as well as taking part in other musical projects. In 2006, in anticipation of bringing Kreyson back, Křížek launched a contest to select new band members. This culminated in a new lineup consisting of Křížek on vocals, Jaroslav Bartoň returning on lead guitar, Radek "Reddy" Kroc on second guitar, Honza Kirk Běhunek on third guitar (a first for a Czech metal band), Luděk Adámek on bass (Adámek had briefly played with the band in 1993), and Zdenek Pradlovský on drums. The band played a pre-launch show on 17 March 2007, which was broadcast live on Czech television from Ostrava's ČEZ Aréna, during which they were joined on stage by Germany's Doro Pesch. In June 2007, Kreyson filmed their first live album, titled Kreyson – Třinec live, at the Noc Plná Hvězd (Star-studded night) international music festival in Třinec. They followed this with a successful tour of Czechia, Germany, and Switzerland in December 2007, together with Doro. Honza Kirk Běhunek left the band around this time.

Kreyson began recording their fifth studio album, Návrat krále (Return of the king), in the spring of 2011. Two singles were released before funds ran out and recording stopped. A new drummer also had to be found after Zdenek Pradlovský left, and Michal Daněk joined the band. With help from sponsors, Kreyson got the opportunity to continue the recording abroad, and they set out for Andy LaRocque's (King Diamond) studio in Varberg, Sweden in 2013. The entire album was thus recorded in LaRocque's Sonic Train Studios, and the artwork for it was done by famed English illustrator Mark Wilkinson (Marillion, Fish, Judas Priest, Iron Maiden). The album was released in October 2013, and subsequently gained gold status.

== Kreyson Memorial ==
In 2016, Kreyson founding member and former guitarist Daniel Krob reached out to a few of his previous bandmates with the idea of a tour commemorating 25 years since the release of the band's debut album Anděl na útěku. The eventual lineup of this live act would be Krob on guitar, Robert Vondrovic on drums, Radek "Reddy" Kroc on second guitar, Petr "Doldy" Dolének on vocals, Stanislav "Jokki" Jokiel on bass, and Marek "Elrin" Svoboda on keyboards. Other former members of Kreyson were set to join the band on stage, including Jaroslav Bartoň and Karel Adam. Křížek was also approached with the offer of joining but declined, citing his renewed commitment to the band Citron. The ensemble, going by the name Kreyson Memorial, began playing shows, and in 2019 they released their first album, a set of original tracks titled Strážci plamenů (Guardians of the flames). Their current lineup consists of Krob, Kroc, Vondrovic, and Dolének, as well as Petr Formánek on bass.

== Kreyson MMXVII ==
In May 2017, Ladislav Křížek announced a new lineup for his band, this time with international contributions from German guitarist Roland Grapow (Helloween, Masterplan) and American drummer Mike Terrana (Rage, Masterplan). The band was further fleshed out by Michal Kůs (Eagleheart) on guitar and Jiří "George" Rain (Citron, Sebastien) on bass. They began to play shows and festivals, and a new album was discussed. Roland Grapow announced his departure from Kreyson in 2019.

== Band members ==
Current members

- Ladislav Křížek – vocals
- Michal Kůs – guitar (2016–present)
- Jiří "George" Rain – bass (2016–present)
- Mike Terrana – drums (2017–present)

Past members

- Jaroslav Bartoň – guitar (1989–2009)
- Daniel Krob – guitar, vocals (1989–1992)
- Karel Adam – bass, keyboards (1989–1993)
- Luděk Adámek – bass (1993; 2007–2016)
- Vítek Fiala – bass (1995)
- Robert Vondrovic – drums (1989–1991)
- Daniel Hafstein – drums (1991–1993)
- Daniel Šůra – drums (1993–1995)
- Karel Schurrer – drums (1995)
- Libor Matejčík – guitar (1992–1993)
- Petr Henych – guitar (1992–1995)
- Radek "Reddy" Kroc – guitar (2007–2016)
- Honza Kirk Běhunek – guitar (2007–2008)
- Zdenek Pradlovský – drums (2007–2012)
- Peter Boška – guitar (2008–2016)
- Michal Daněk – drums (2012–2016)
- Roland Grapow – guitar (2017–2019)

== Discography ==
=== Studio albums ===
- Anděl na útěku (1990)
- Angel on the Run (1990)
- Křižáci (1992)
- Crusaders (1992)
- Elixír života (1993)
- Zákon džungle (1995)
- Návrat krále (2013)

=== Compilations ===
- The Best of (1996)
- 20 Years of Kreyson (2009)

=== Live albums ===
- Kreyson Live – Třinec 2007 CD/DVD (2007)
