= Katapult (band) =

Czech rock band

- Origin: Plzeň, Czechoslovakia
- Genre: Rock
- Years active: 1975–present
- Labels: Supraphon; Panton; Monitor
- Awards: Zlatý slavík (1978, 1979, 1980); Beatová síň slávy (2007)
- Members: Oldřich Říha; Karel Dvořák; Roman Krajdl
- Past members: Jiří Šindelář; Vladimír Krampol; Anatoli Kohout; Ludmila Podubecká; Jaroslav Kadlec; Milan Tutsch; Jiří Stárek; Pavel Lopata; Milan Balcar; Michal Šindelář; Karel Jahn; Andy Budka; Ondřej Timpl
- Website: katapult.cz

Katapult is a Czech rock band founded in 1975 in Plzeň by guitarist Oldřich Říha. The group's classic lineup also included bassist Jiří "Dědek" Šindelář (d. 2009) and drummer Anatoli "Tolja" Kohout (d. 2007). They issued their debut studio album, 2006, in 1980, with their second one, Rock de luxe, being delayed until 1986, following a government ban. Katapult was active until 1991 and once more from 1993 onward, following a hiatus. They have won the Zlatý slavík award three times, and in 2007, they were inducted into the Beatová síň slávy. After Dědek's death in 2009, the band split up again but reformed the same year with a new lineup that left Říha as the only original member. They have released ten studio albums, five live records, and numerous compilations.

== History ==
=== 1975–76: Early days—Mahagon and classic lineup ===
Katapult was formed in early 1975 by guitarist Oldřich Říha, who had been fired from František Ringo Čech's Prague-based band in late 1974 and thus returned to Plzeň, where he played with a group called Mahagon, which also included bassist Jiří "Dědek" Šindelář and drummer Vladimír "Charlie" Krampol. The band mostly played songs Říha had written either for himself or for Jiří Schelinger. After Mahagon got in trouble for performing without a permit, they relocated to Prague. There was already a band by that name in the capital city, however, but at the time, Říha's friend, the drummer Anatoli "Tolja" Kohout (with whom he played in Aleš Ulm's Citrón), was playing in a disintegrating band named Katapult with the singer Viktor Sodoma (who had also recently left Ringo Čech's side) and bassist Vladimír Kulhánek, and he offered Říha the moniker as a replacement for Mahagon; Tolja ultimately joined the group as well. They later added the singer Ludmila Podubecká, though she and Charlie would leave by the end of the year, with Katapult remaining a trio.

=== 1976–78: Singles and live album ===
In 1976, the label Supraphon financed the recording of Katapult's first single, "Půlnoční Závodní Dráha" / "Lesní Manekýn", whose hard rock style was met with success, selling over 100,000 copies. Tolja then left to join the Ota Petřina Group. He was replaced by Jaroslav Kadlec. Katapult released several more singles between 1976 and 1979, and in 1977, Tolja reclaimed his spot as the band's drummer after Kadlec's departure. In 1978, the group published their first album, a self-titled live recording that went on to sell over 150,000 copies. That year, Katapult played at Prague's Lucerna Music Bar for the first time and also toured in Slovakia, but despite winning second place in the Zlatý slavík poll, they were later banned from performing in Prague.

=== 1979–83: 2006, Zlatý slavík, and media blackout ===
In 1979, Katapult recorded their debut studio album, 2006, which featured Ota Petřina on guitar. Tolja subsequently left once more, this time being replaced by Milan Tutsch (ex-Citron). Jiří "Mamut" Stárek (ex-František Ringo Čech Band) took the place of Tutsch later the same year. Also in 1979, Katapult won first place in the Zlatý slavík poll; they repeated the feat a year later, though the event was moved to Bratislava from Prague, due to government bans on several groups. Additionally, the band toured in Poland as well as in East Germany, where they were accompanied by Stern-Combo Meißen. In 1980, 2006 was released in two versions—a Czech one and an English one—and the band subsequently signed a three-year deal with Supraphon. At the beginning of 1981, Kadlec returned to Katapult, taking the place of Mamut. While the band's freedom was increasingly being curtailed at home, they were able to perform in Poland that year alongside the Polish rockers Perfect. Things became more dire in 1982, with the imposition of a total media ban on the group as well as Supraphon reneging on their contractual duties. In 1983, Říha began releasing singles under his own name.

=== 1985–1993: Return to performing, new releases, and hiatus ===
Things began to turn around for the band in 1985, when they were finally allowed to perform in Prague once more, after close to six years, albeit under the name Olda Říha and Katapult. In 1986, other bands who had been banned from performing, such as Pražský výběr and Etc..., were also able to resume activity. That year, Supraphon released the first Katapult album since 1980, titled Rock de luxe, which went on to sell about 80,000 copies. Later that year, after leaving Katapult, Jaroslav Kadlec committed suicide.

In 1988, Katapult issued their second live album, Pozor, rock! Live 1988, and they toured Slovakia with Tublatanka in December. In 1989, they published their third studio album, ...a co Rock 'n' Roll !!!, and they subsequently toured with Kern, Elán, and Winter's Reign. Additionally, their album 2006 was belatedly certified gold for the sale of 250,000 copies. In 1991, the band released the album Taste of Freedom, a collaboration with the Irish singer Robbie "Animal" Hurley (Winter's Reign). They subsequently entered a two-year hiatus following Dědek's departure for the United States, before beginning to tour again in 1993. That year, Katapult opened for Deep Purple at the Sportovní hala Fortuna in Prague.

=== 1995–2007: Return, new albums, and Beatová síň slávy ===
In May 1995, Katapult released their fifth studio album, Chodníkový blues. The band promoted it with a tour that also celebrated their 20-year anniversary, which included performances with Slade and the Sweet. Following the tour, Milan Balcar left and was replaced by a returning Tolja, and Katapult performed with Status Quo in Brno. In 1998, Tolja was replaced by Dědek's son Michal Šindelář, and Katapult performed once more with Deep Purple as well as with Status Quo. The band issued their next album, Konec srandy, in 1999.

In 2000, Katapult celebrated 25 years with the release of the live album Zlatá deska – 25 let live. Two years later, they issued their third compilation, titled Hit Album 3 (1990–2000). Their next studio album, Všechno nebo nic, followed in 2005 and included the once-more returning Tolja on drums. It also featured guest vocals by Jozef Ráž, Miroslav Žbirka, Josef Vojtek, Vladimír Šafránek, Peter Hrivňák, Lou Fanánek Hagen, and Martin Ďurinda. Katapult also celebrated 30 years as a band that year with a tour. In 2006, they played a concert for children at Prague Castle, to which they were invited by President Václav Klaus. In 2007, the band was inducted into the Beatová síň slávy. Anatoli "Tolja" Kohout died the same year, and Říha and Dědek finished the year as an acoustic duo.

=== 2008–present: Farewell tour, Dědek's death, and continued activity ===
In 2008, Katapult announced a fairwell tour, due to the fact that Dědek was suffering from COPD and could no longer keep up with the band's usual performance schedule. Dědek died in January 2009. Karel "Káša" Jahn, who had replaced Tolja on drums two years before, died a month later.

Though he considered disbanding Katapult after Dědek's death, Říha ultimately decided to persevere, and after hiring two new musicians—bassist Andy Budka and drummer Ondřej Timpl—the band continued to tour. In 2010, they released their next studio album, Radosti života. In 2015, they celebrated 40 years as a band, and in 2016, they issued Kladivo na život. In 2023, Katapult published their tenth studio album, Nostalgia, which also marked Říha's 60th year of musical activity. Nostalgia did not include input from Budka and Timpl but instead featured new bassist Karel "Bigman Kodl" Dvořák and guest drummer Václav Zima. The band subsequently toured in support of the album.

== Band members ==
Current

- Oldřich Říha – guitar, vocals (1975–present)
- Karel "Bigman Kodl" Dvořák – bass (2023-present)
- Roman Krajdl – drums (2025–present)

Past

- Jiří "Dědek" Šindelář – bass, backing vocals (1975–2009)
- Vladimír "Charlie" Krampol – percussion (1975)
- Anatoli "Tolja" Kohout – drums (1975–1976; 1976–1979; 1995–1998; 2004–2007)
- Ludmila Podubecká – vocals (1975)
- Jaroslav Kadlec – drums (1976–1977; 1981–1986)
- Milan Tutsch – drums (1979)
- Jiří "Mamut" Stárek – drums (1979–1981)
- Pavel Lopata – drums (1986–1987)
- Milan Balcar – drums (1987–1995)
- Michal Šindelář – drums (1998–2004)
- Karel "Káša" Jahn – drums (2007–2009)
- Andy Budka – bass (2009–2021)
- Ondřej Timpl – drums (2009–2021)

== Discography ==
Studio albums

- 2006 (1980)
- Rock de Luxe (1986)
- ...a co Rock 'n' Roll!!! (1989)
- Taste of Freedom with Robbie "Animal" Hurley (1991)
- Chodníkový blues (1995)
- Konec srandy (1999)
- Všechno nebo nic (2005)
- Radosti života (2010)
- Kladivo na život (2016)
- Nostalgia (2023)

Live albums

- Katapult (1978)
- Pozor, rock! Live 1988 (1988)
- Zlatá deska – 25 let live (2000)
- Long Live (2005)
- Made in Rock 'n' Roll (Live Futurum Praha) (2012)

Compilations

- Hit Album (SP 1976–1988) (1991)
- Hit Album 2 (SP 1976–1989) (1994)
- Hit Album 3 (1990–2000) (2002)
- Grand Greatest Hits (2006)
- 50 let hraju rock! 1963–2013 (2012)
- Zlaté Hity (2018)
- Essential/Zlatá kolekce (2018)
- Singly (2018)

DVDs

- Long Live (2005)
- Tour 2008 – Poslední Turné... Na Rozloučenou! (2008)
- Rock života (2011)
- Tisíce a jedné noci (2013)

Box sets

- Good bye (2008)
- Memorial – Posledních 15 Let (2009)
- V Beatové Síni Slávy (2009)
- Super Silver Edition Limited Box (2018)
- 80's Album Trilogy Vinyl Box (2025)
