= Dragoun =

Dragoun (feminine: Dragounová) is a Czech surname, meaning 'dragoon'. Notable people with the surname include:

- František Roman Dragoun (1916–2005), Czech portrait painter
- Michal Dragoun (born 1983), Czech ice hockey player
- Roman Dragoun (born 1956), Czech singer, songwriter and keyboardist

== See also ==
- Dragun (surname)
