= Ota Petřina =

Czech musician (1949–2015)

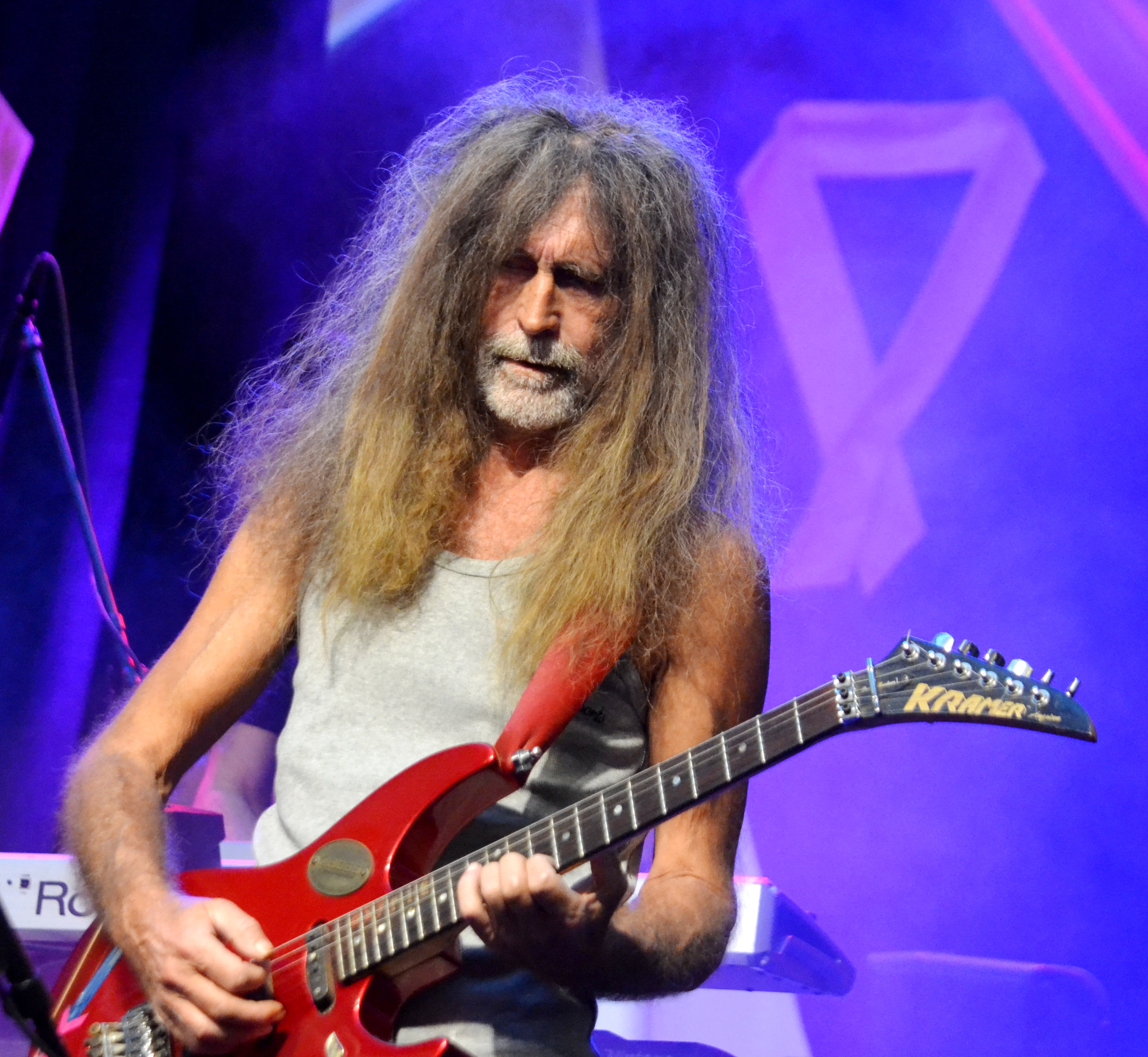
- Petřina in 2014

Background information
- Born: Otakar Petřina; 4 June 1949; Malé Žernoseky, Czechoslovakia
- Died: 11 July 2015 (aged 66) Statenice, Czech Republic
- Genres: Rock; pop; progressive rock
- Occupation: Musician
- Instrument: Guitar

Ota Petřina (4 June 1949 – 11 July 2015) was a Czech guitarist and songwriter. During his career, he primarily wrote songs for other artists, including Marta Kubišová, Helena Vondráčková, Václav Neckář, and Petra Janů. He was also the leader of Neckář's band Bacily. He released two solo albums, 1978's Super – robot and 1983's Pečeť.

== Career ==
In the early days of his musical career, Petřina accompanied Marta Kubišová, Václav Neckář, and Helena Vondráčková in the Rococo Theater Orchestra, from which the group Golden Kids was formed. He went on to write numerous other songs for the three musicians. After Golden Kids was banned by the communist regime, Petřina led Neckář's band Bacily, from 1971 until 1974.

In 1978, Petřina released his debut album, Super – robot, which he produced together with his friend, musician and lyricist Zdeněk Rytíř. In the second half of the 1970s and the first half of the 1980s, Petřina mainly collaborated with singer Petra Janů. He wrote all the tracks on her first two albums, Motorest (1978) and Exploduj (1980). He went on to write the lyrics for her two subsequent albums, Já & My (1982) and Ročník 50 (1984).

In 1982, together with Ladislav Kantor, he wrote the lyrics to the first part of Václav Neckář's Příběhy, písně a balady trilogy. He also collaborated with Kantor on some songs for the band C&K Vocal, in which Luboš Pospíšil, among others, performed. In 1983, he co-authored Pospíšil's first solo album, Tenhle vítr jsem měl rád. The title track went on to become one of Pospíšil's biggest hits. In the same year, Petřina released his second and last solo album, titled Pečeť, on which he collaborated with poet Pavel Vrba.

In the second half of the 1980s, Petřina wrote several songs for singer Eva Hurychová and returned to Václav Neckář to help him write the hard rock album Pod komandem lásky, which was released in 1988. After 1989, he again devoted himself extensively to concerts with Neckář's band Bacily and wrote several new songs for Petra Janů's comeback. He also composed songs for other musicians, including Hana Zagorová, Jiří Korn, Jitka Zelenková, Petr Rezek, Michal Prokop, and Aleš Brichta.

In 2010, Petřina was inducted into the Beatová síň slávy.

== Death ==
Petřina died on 11 July 2015, aged 66.

== Family ==
Petřina's son, Otakar "Marpo" Petřina Jr. is a rapper and formerly the drummer for the rock band Chinaski.

== Discography ==
Studio albums

- Super – robot (1978)
- Pečeť (1983)

Soundtracks

- Koncert (1980)
- Smrt talentovaného ševce (1982)
