= Progres 2 =

Czech rock band

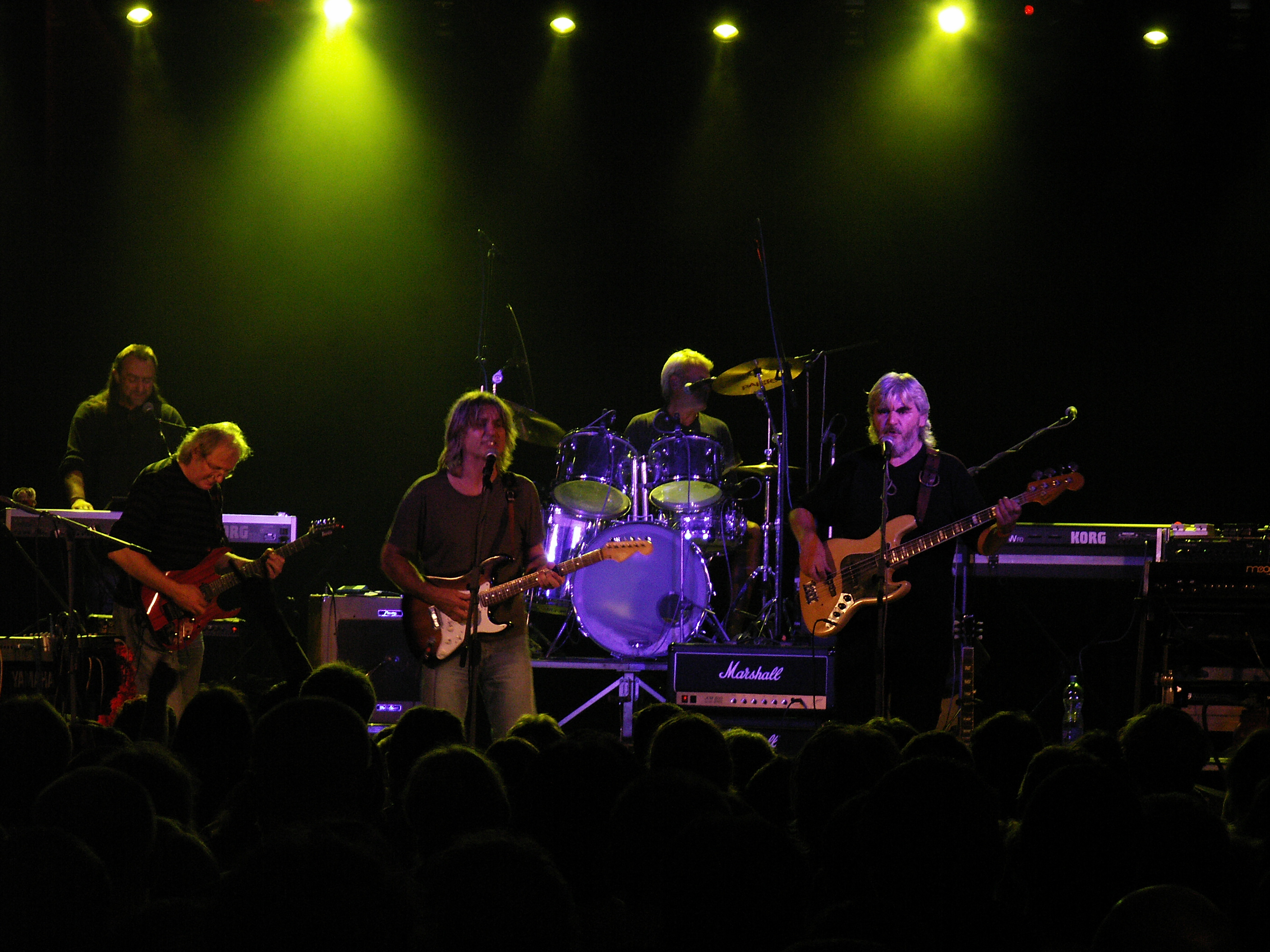
- Progres 2 performing in 2006. L–R: Borek Nedorost, Miloš Morávek, Pavel Váně, Zdeněk Kluka, Pavel Pelc

Background information
- Also known as: The Progress Organization (1968–1971); Barnodaj (1977); Progres-Pokrok (1987–1990)
- Origin: Brno, Czechoslovakia
- Genres: Art rock; big-beat
- Years active: 1968–1970; 1971; 1977–1990; 1992–present
- Labels: Panton; Bonton; FT; Supraphon; Indies
- Spinoffs: Bronz; Futurum
- Members: Pavel Váně; Zdeněk Kluka; Miloš Morávek; Roman Dragoun
- Past members: Jan Sochor; Emanuel Sideridis; Pavel Pelc; Miloš Morávek; Karel Horký; Aleš Bajger; Peter Peteraj; Milan Nytra; Pavla Dvořáčková; Dalibor Dunovský; Mirek Sova; Ivan Manolov; Borek Nedorost
- Website: progres2.org

Progres 2 is an art rock band from Brno, Czechia, established in 1968 as the Progress Organization, a name they retained until 1971. In 1977, they recorded the album Mauglí under the name Barnodaj and subsequently became known as Progres 2. The band's original lineup consisted of Zdeněk Kluka, Pavel Váně, Jan Sochor, and Emanuel Sideridis. Kluka has remained the only stable member of the group to the present day. Over the course of their career, they have released eight studio albums, two EPs, three live records, and two compilations, as well as a number of singles.

== History ==
=== The Progress Organization: 1968–1971 ===
In 1968, Zdeněk Kluka (drums), Pavel Váně (guitar), Jan Sochor (keyboards), and the Greek bassist Emanuel Sideridis formed the Progress Organization, which had as its inspiration such groups as the Beatles, Cream, Vanilla Fudge, and Pink Floyd. After several performances, they were invited to open for the Beach Boys in June 1969 at the Královo Pole indoor arena in Brno. In 1970, they issued the three-track EP Klíč k poznání and subsequently broke up, due to the increasing pressures of "normalization". In 1971, the Progress Organization reformed and published the full-length album Barnodaj.

=== Side projects and Barnodaj: 1971–1978 ===
Following the release, Kluka, Sochor, and Sideridis, went on to play with the Aleš Sigmund Group, the backing band for the pop duo Martha a Tena. Váně briefly played with the Slovak progressive rock band Collegium Musicum and with Atlantis. He joined the Aleš Sigmund Group in 1972, but by that time, both Kluka and Sochor had left, and Sideridis eventually returned to Greece. Kluka and Sochor founded the Jan Sochor Group in 1972, which accompanied singer-songwriter Bob Frídl. Two years later, Váně also joined, with bassist Pavel Pelc. They began writing music again in 1977, and a year later, they issued the album Mauglí under the name Barnodaj.

=== Progres 2: 1977–1987 ===
While still recording Mauglí, Kluka, Váně, and Pelc recruited the keyboardist Karel Horký and guitarist Miloš Morávek and began working on the rock opera Dialog s vesmírem under the name Progres 2. It premiered in 1978, and the group toured the nation with it until 1980, also releasing an album by the same name. Horký had left in 1979, and Pelc took over his parts in the production.

Following Dialog s vesmírem, the band experienced disagreements about future projects, which culminated in Váně's departure, who went on to form the group Bronz. Progres 2 was rounded out by keyboardist Roman Dragoun, and they began working on another rock opera, this one titled Třetí kniha džunglí, which premiered in 1981 and was released as an album in 1982 and later translated into English as The Third Book of the Jungle. In 1983, Morávek and Dragoun left to form the group Futurum, and the guitarists Aleš Bajger and Peter Peteraj became new members of Progres 2. In this lineup, the band created a third rock opera, Mozek, based on a short story by the Soviet writer Anatoly Dneprov. In 1985, Peteraj departed the group and was replacead by keyboardist Milan Nytra. The band put together a new musical program, this one simply titled Progres 2, which was released as the album Změna! in 1987.

=== Progres-Pokrok: 1987–1990 ===
Bajger and Pelc left the band in 1987, with only drummer Zdeněk Kluka remaining as an original member. The group, which then included keyboardist Nytra, added guitarist Mirek Sova, bassist Dalibor Dunovský, and singer Pavla Dvořáčková, and renamed itself Progres-Pokrok. They began working on a new project, titled Otrava krve, which they performed from 1988 until 1989 under StB supervision. The album was released in 1990, and the band ceased activity the same year.

=== Progres 2 again: 1992–present ===
Progres 2 reformed in 1992 with a lineup that consisted of Kluka, Váně, and Pelc, along with new guitarist Ivan Manolov and keyboardist Borek Nedorost, performing a series of comeback concerts. Their activity, which continues to the present day, has been sporadic, however. In 1993, they were nominated for inclusion in the Beatová síň slávy.

In October 2008, Progres 2 put on a double concert, titled Progres Story 1968–2008, to celebrate the 40th anniversary of the founding of the Progress Organization. It was held at Brno's Semilasso cultural centre and included appearances by almost all musicians who had ever been members of the band. The group's core lineup at these shows consisted of Kluka, Váně, Pelc, Miloš Morávek, and Roman Dragoun. The performances were recorded and compiled into the double album and DVD Progres Story 1968–2008, issued in November of that year.

In 2016, they were inducted into the Beatová síň slávy.

In 2018, the band recorded a new studio album, Tulák po hvězdách, based on the 1915 science fiction novel The Star Rover by Jack London. It was released later that year. This coincided with a celebration of the band's 50th anniversary, which was turned into a television documentary film by Czech Television.

In July 2021, longtime bassist Pavel Pelc died at the age of 71.

== Band members ==
=== The Progress Organization (1968–1971) ===
- Zdeněk Kluka – drums, vocals
- Pavel Váně – guitar, vocals
- Jan Sochor – keyboards, vocals
- Emanuel Sideridis – bass, vocals

=== Barnodaj (1977) ===
- Zdeněk Kluka – drums, vocals
- Pavel Váně – guitar, vocals
- Jan Sochor – keyboards, vocals
- Pavel Pelc – bass

=== Progres 2 (1977–1987) ===
- Zdeněk Kluka – drums, vocals (1977–1987)
- Pavel Váně – guitar, vocals (1977–1980)
- Pavel Pelc – bass (1977–1987)
- Miloš Morávek – guitar (1977–1983)
- Karel Horký – keyboards (1977–1979)
- Roman Dragoun – keyboards, vocals (1980–1983)
- Peter Peteraj – guitar (1983–1985)
- Aleš Bajger – guitar, vocals (1983–1987)
- Milan Nytra – keyboards (1985–1990)

=== Progres-Pokrok (1987–1990) ===
- Zdeněk Kluka – drums, vocals
- Milan Nytra – keyboards
- Pavlína Dvořáčková – vocals
- Mirek Sova – guitar
- Dalibor Dunovský – bass

=== Progres 2 (1992–present) ===
- Zdeněk Kluka – drums, vocals
- Pavel Váně – guitar, vocals
- Pavel Pelc – bass (1992–2021✝︎)
- Ivan Manolov – guitar (1992–2005)
- Borek Nedorost – keyboards, vocals (1992–2007)
- Miloš Morávek – guitar (2005–present)
- Roman Dragoun – keyboards, vocals (2007–present)

== Discography ==
Studio albums

- Barnodaj (1971, the Progress Organization)
- Mauglí (1978, Barnodaj)
- Dialog s vesmírem (1980, Progres 2)
- Třetí kniha džunglí (1982, Progres 2)
- The Third Book of the Jungle (1984, English version of Třetí kniha džunglí)
- Mozek (1984, Progres 2)
- Změna (1988, Progres 2)
- Otrava krve (1990, Progres-Pokrok)
- Tulák po hvězdách (2018, Progres 2)

EPs

- Klíč k poznání (1970, the Progress Organization)
- Dialog s vesmírem (1980, Progres 2)

Live albums

- Dialog s vesmírem (live) (1993, Progres 2)
- Progres story 1968–2008 (2008, Progres 2)
- Live (2016, Progres)

Compilations

- Mozek/Změna (2000, Progres 2)
- Dialog s vesmírem (studio & live) (2010, Progres 2)

Video albums

- Progres story 1968–2008 (2008, Progres 2)
