= Beatová síň slávy =

Listing of people who have significantly contributed to Czech rock music

Beatová síň slávy (Czech for Beat Hall of Fame or simply BSS) is a listing of people who have significantly contributed to Czech (or Czechoslovak) rock music. Nominations are made in three categories: musician, dead musician, and band. Each year's selections are voted on by listeners of Radio Beat station.

== Inductees ==
Year	Musician	Dead musician	Band	Induction date
2004	Vladimír Mišík	Jiří Schelinger	Blue Effect	16 May 2004
2005	Radim Hladík	Milan Hlavsa	Pražský výběr	
2006	Michal Pavlíček	Petr Kalandra	Hudba Praha/Jasná Páka	8 June 2006
2007	Michal Prokop	Petr Novák	Katapult	14 June 2007
2008	Aleš Brichta	Miki Volek	Arakain	20 May 2008
2009	Lou Fanánek Hagen	Jiří Šindelář	Visací zámek	16 June 2009
2010	Ota Petřina	František Kotva	Etc...	27 May 2010
2011	Jan Haubert	Jan Ivan Wünsch	Tři sestry	13 June 2011
2012	Roman Dragoun	Vladimír Padrůněk	The Plastic People of the Universe	17 May 2012
2013	Vladimír Guma Kulhánek	Ivan Martin Jirous	Flamengo	5 June 2013
2014	Tomáš Hajíček	Vlado Čech	Kabát	13 September 2014
2015	Kamil Střihavka	Petr Skoumal	Stromboli	19 June 2015
2016	Martin Kraus	Ota Petřina	Progres 2	27 May 2016
2017	Luboš Pospíšil	Radim Hladík	Framus Five	26 May 2017
2018	Michal Ambrož	Zdeněk Juračka	Krucipüsk	26 May 2018
2019	Jan Spálený	Oldřich Veselý	Olympic	24 May 2019
2020	Pavel Váně	Filip Topol	Krausberry	23 May 2020
