= Richard Scheufler =

Czech musician (born 1964)

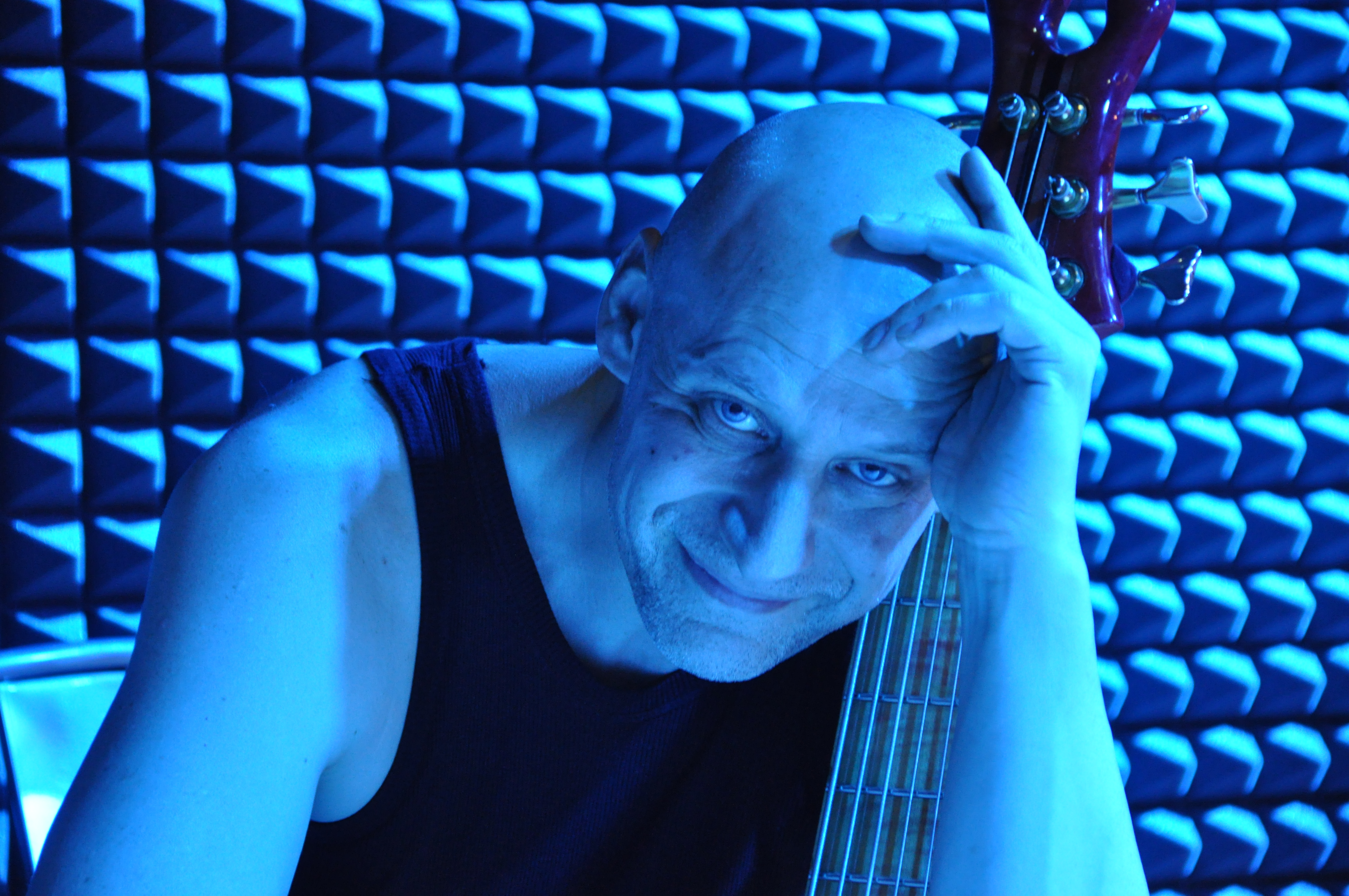
- Scheufler in 2010

Background information
- Born: 1 November 1964 (age 60); Ústí nad Labem, Czechoslovakia
- Genres: Funk; pop; rock; jazz; classical
- Occupations: Musician; composer; teacher; producer
- Instruments: Bass guitar; vocals; piano; drums
- Labels: Scheufler's Records
- Formerly of: King Size; Pražský výběr II; Krucipüsk

Richard Scheufler (born 1 November 1964) is a Czech multi-instrumentalist, singer, composer, music arranger, teacher, and producer. His music spans a mixture of various styles including funk, pop, rock, modern jazz, hardcore, and their fusion with classical music.

== Musical beginnings and education ==
Scheufler showed talent for music already in his early childhood. He was barely three years old when he started to play the harmonica, and he gradually learned to play piano and percussion. He pursued his musical ambitions by performing in a children's orchestra under the guidance of his uncle. After the breakup of the orchestra, the thirteen-year-old Scheufler switched to the bass guitar, which he plays to this day. He initially studied music on his own and later took private lessons between 1987 and 1989. From 1998 until 1999, he continued his musical education at the Jaroslav Ježek Conservatory in Prague, where he also took singing lessons.

== Career ==
=== Musical projects ===
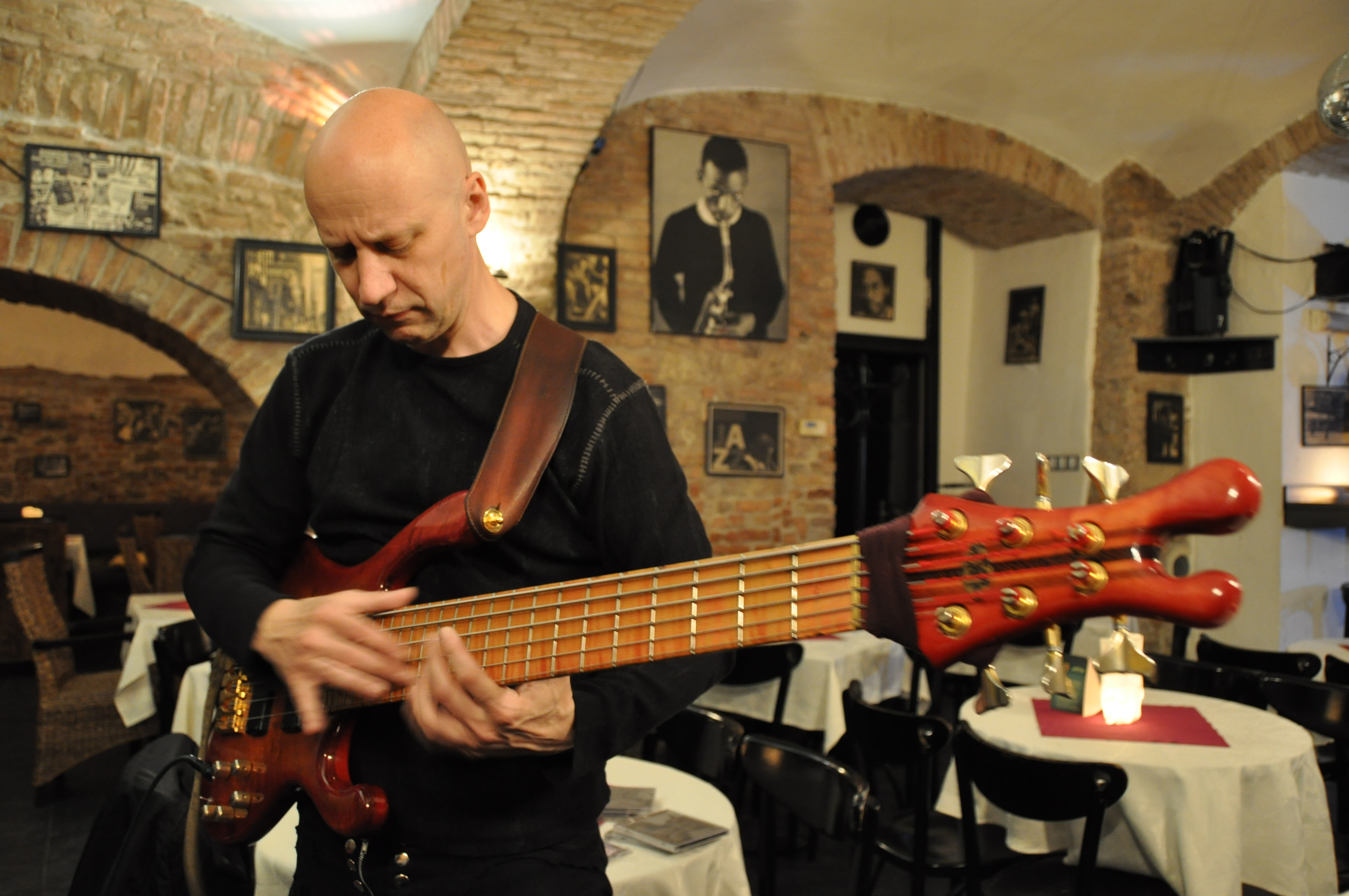
Scheufler rehearsing before a concert

After performing with regional bands, in 1986, Scheufler obtained his first professional engagement in the band Natural, with whom he played for approximately four years. After that, he performed in the band Buran Prášil and in 1990, he joined Dalibor Janda's band. An encounter with musician and composer Milan Steigerwald meant another important move in Scheufler's professional career—for the following twelve years, he was a member of the band King Size. At the same time, he appeared as a guest musician on recordings by several pop artists, such as Karel Gott, Lucie Bílá, and Lenka Filipová. In 2002, he participated in the recording of the Damiens album Nechci zůstat sám and won a Golden Disc certification it. Scheufler has also contributed to various jazz projects, such as the band Blue Birds, which consists of saxophonists Ivan Myslikovjan and Andrea Kolmanová.

In 2007, when Michael Kocáb reformed the band Pražský výběr under the name Pražský výběr II, Scheufler was brought in to play bass. He remained with the project until 2009, helping them release the 2007 album Vymlácený rockový palice.

Between 2011 and 2015, he assumed the position of bass player in the metal band Krucipüsk.

=== Scheufler & son ===
Scheufler's son, Richard Scheufler Jr., is a drummer, and has collaborated with his father on several projects, including occasional stints with the band King Size and contributing to the Damiens album Nechci zůstat sám when he was only twelve years old. He also took part in a tour for Lenka Filipová and played on his father's second solo album, Between us (2008). Since 2004, they both have been performing as permanent guest artists in the rock opera Antigona.

=== Overseas activity ===
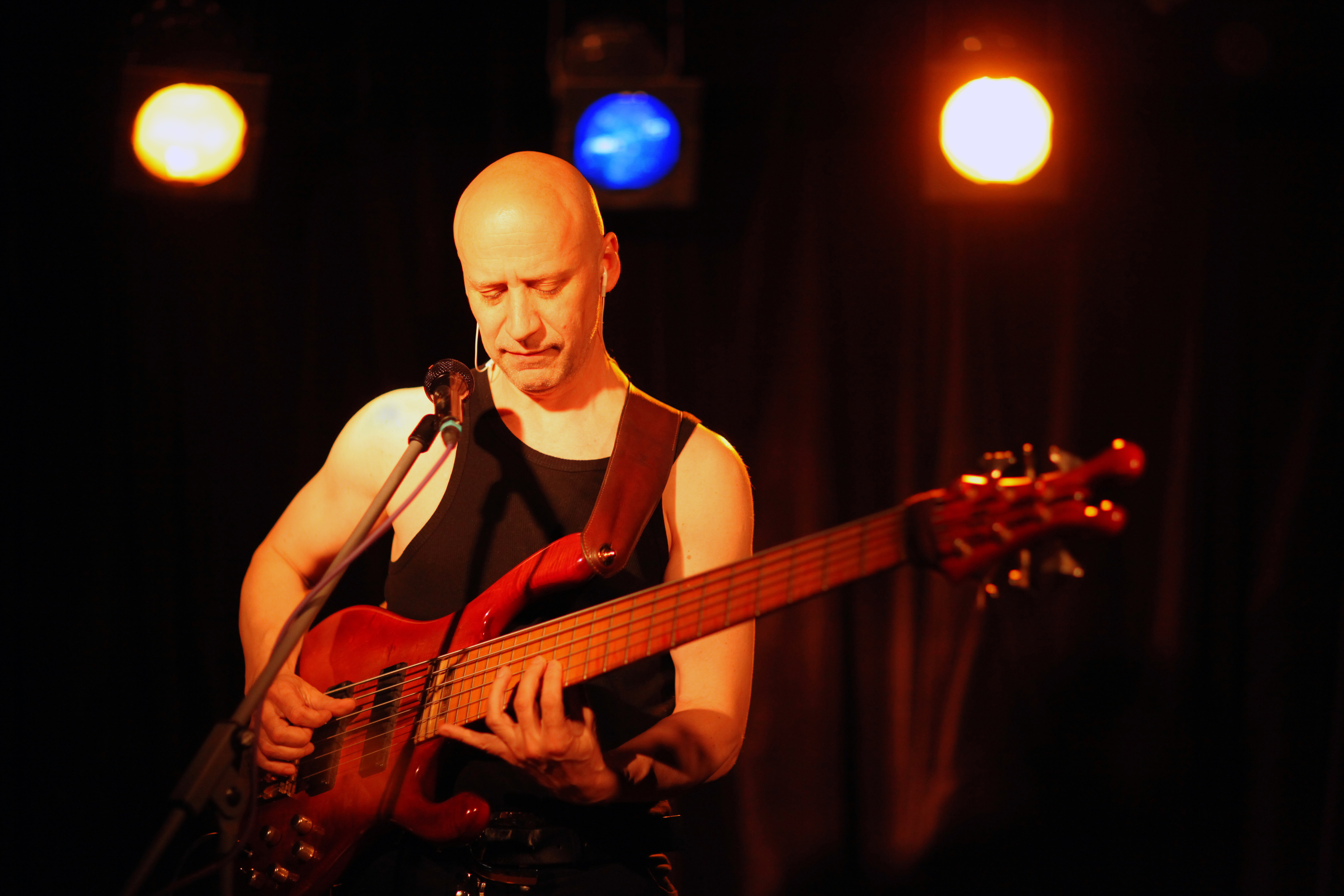
Richard Scheufler during a solo concert

At the end of 2002 Scheufler moved to Hastings, England. He worked at the music studio of Claire Hamill and performed with local artists as well as on his own. While there, Scheufler began a collaboration with Ghanaian percussionist Nana Tsiboe, contributing to his project Bushfaya.

=== Solo work ===
In Your Hands
Music by Richard Scheufler, lyrics by Ted Whang; Album: Richard Scheufler - Between Us, 2008

Richard Scheufler's debut album, titled V rukou tvých, was released in 2001 in two versions, Czech and English. Scheufler not only sings and plays on the album, but also composed, arranged, and produced the record. His second solo album, Between Us, was produced between 2004 and 2008 and released under the label Scheufler's Records in 2008. The album includes vocal and instrumental compositions, with contributions from various artists, including Scheufler's son Richard Jr.

=== Music teaching ===
Apart from his performing work, Scheufler has also conducted bass lessons and in 1994, he published the teaching video Slap & Funky. From 1997 until 2002, he was engaged as a lecturer at music-oriented summer camps for students.

== Partial discography ==
=== with King Size ===
- Lovci Těl (1992)
- Jezebel (1993)
- Happy Sapiens (1993)
- Psychothriller (Příkrý Les) (1993)
- Romeo & Julie (1997)
- King Size (2004)

=== Solo ===
- V Rukou Tvých (2001)
- Classical Music (2003)
- Between Us (2004)

=== Other ===
- Karel Gott – Vánoční Koncert (1992)
- Ondřej Soukup – Nahota na prodej (1993)
- Lucie Bílá – Zahrada Rajských Potešení (1994)
- Katryna – Yadid Nefesh (2000)
- David Stárek – Jediná (2001)
- Lešek Semelka – Muj Vek (2001)
- Damiens – Nechci zustat sám (2002)
- Marcel Jakubovie – Z Druhé Strany (2002)
- Myslikovjan & Scheufler – The 4 Seasons (2002)
- The Scheuflers – My World (2003)
- Bushfaya – Bushfaya (2003)
- Andrea Kolman – Andrea (2003)
- Kečup – Frontální útok (2005)
- Pražský Výběr II – Vymlácený rockový palice (2007)
- Jan Militký – Sběrné suroviny (2007)

=== Instructional publications ===
- Slap & Funky (1994)
