= Luboš Pospíšil =

Czech musician (born 1950)

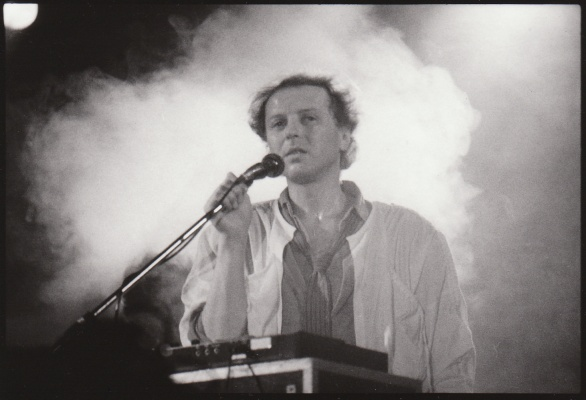
- Pospíšil in 1987

Background information
- Born: 6 September 1950 (age 75); Jeseník, Czechoslovakia
- Genres: Rock, Pop
- Occupation: Musician
- Instruments: Vocals, guitar
- Years active: 1969–present
- Member of: 5P
- Formerly of: C&K Vocal; Blue Effect; Bio-Graf
- Website: lubospospisil.cz

Luboš Pospíšil (born 6 September 1950) is a Czech singer-songwriter and guitarist, and the frontman of the pop-rock band 5P. In 1969, he was a founding member of C&K Vocal, and since he left the band, he has released twelve solo albums. Between 1988 and 1990, he was a member of Blue Effect.

== Career ==
Pospíšil began his musical career in 1969 as a co-founder of the group C&K Vocal, together with Jiří Cerha, Ladislav Kantor, Petra Janů, Helena Arnetová, Milena Červená, and Karel Klos. He recorded the album Generation with the group in 1975. In the 1980s, he launched a solo career and in 1982, released his debut album, Tenhle vítr jsem měl rád, which included compositions by Ota Petřina and lyrics by Kantor. His second album, Love Prayer, was recorded with the group 5P and released in 1983. His next two albums, ...a nestřílejte na milence (1986) and Jsem v tom (1987), were both credited to the band, which included multi-instrumentalist Michal Pavlík (Čechomor, George & Beatovens) and drummer David Koller (Jasná Páka, Blue Effect, Lucie). 5P also included guitarist Bohumil Zatloukal (Jasná Páka), who worked on Pospíšil's next record, Vzdálená tvář, in 1993. The two have since occasionally toured together as an acoustic duo.

Between 1988 and 1990, Pospíšil sang and played guitar in the rock band Blue Effect. His only recording with them was the 1989 single "Kampa" and its B-side, "Úhel pohledu", both of which he wrote.

In 1998, Pospíšil recorded the album Můžem si za to oba with Bio-Graf. With 2008's Příznaky lásky, he returned to 5P and has remained with the band since. In 2011, they released the album Chutnáš po cizím ovoci, followed in 2014 by Soukromá elegie. Pospíšil's latest record, Poesis Beat, was released in 2021.

In 2017, Pospíšil was inducted into the Beatová síň slávy.

== Discography ==
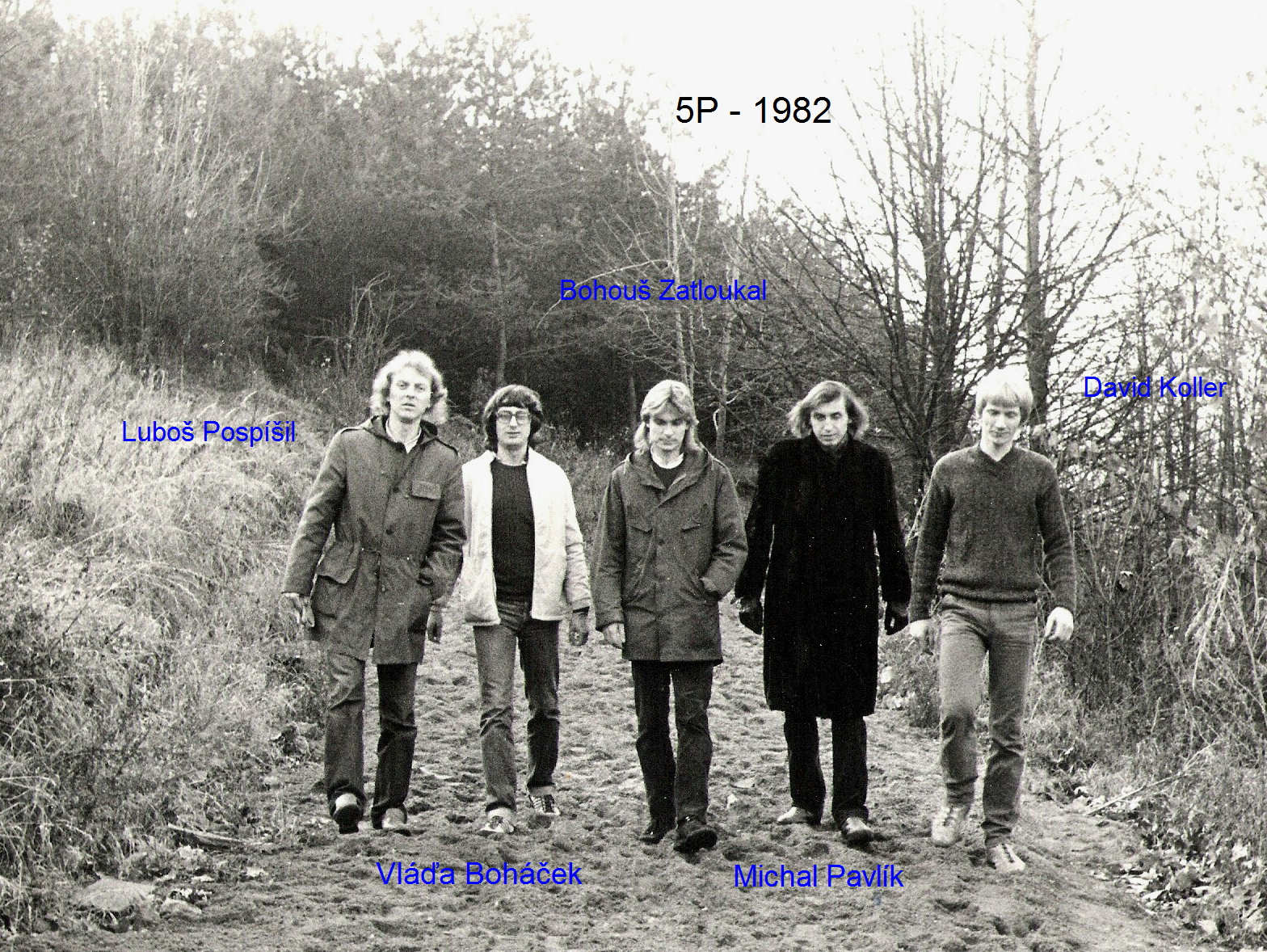
5P in 1982

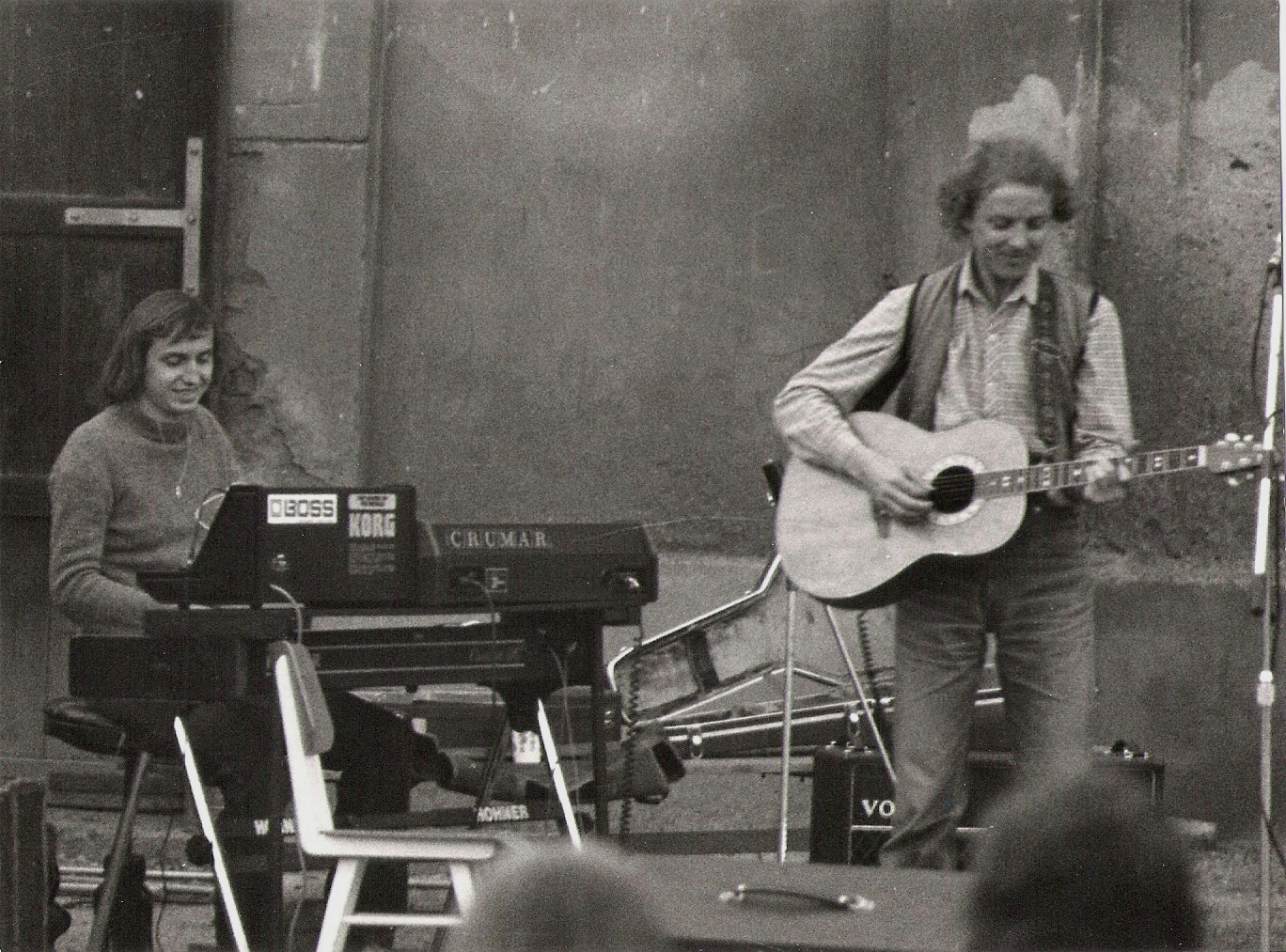
Michal Pavlík (left) and Luboš Pospíšil playing with 5P in 1983

=== Solo and with 5P ===
Studio albums

- Tenhle vítr jsem měl rád (1982)
- Love Prayer (1983)
- ...a nestřílejte na milence (1986)
- Jsem v tom (1987)
- Třináctá komora (1991)
- Hazardní slavnost (2001)
- Příznaky lásky (2008)
- Chutnáš po cizím ovoci (2011)
- Soukromá elegie (2014)
- Poesis Beat (2021)

Compilations

- Vzpomínka Na Jednu Venkovskou Tancovačku 1977–1983 (1994)
- 20 největších hitů (2002)
- Klub osamělých srdcí (Best of 2) (2004)
- Tenhle vítr jsem měl rád – To nejlepší (2CD, 2010)
- Route 66 – Exit 1 (1978–1993) (7CD, 2016)
- Route 66 – Exit 2 (1998–2016) (6CD, 2016)

Live albums

- Live!!! Ostrava (2019)

=== with Bohumil Zatloukal ===
- Vzdálená tvář (1993)

=== with Bio-Graf ===
- Můžem si za to oba (1998)
