= Michal Pavlíček =

Czech musician, composer, and producer (born 1956)

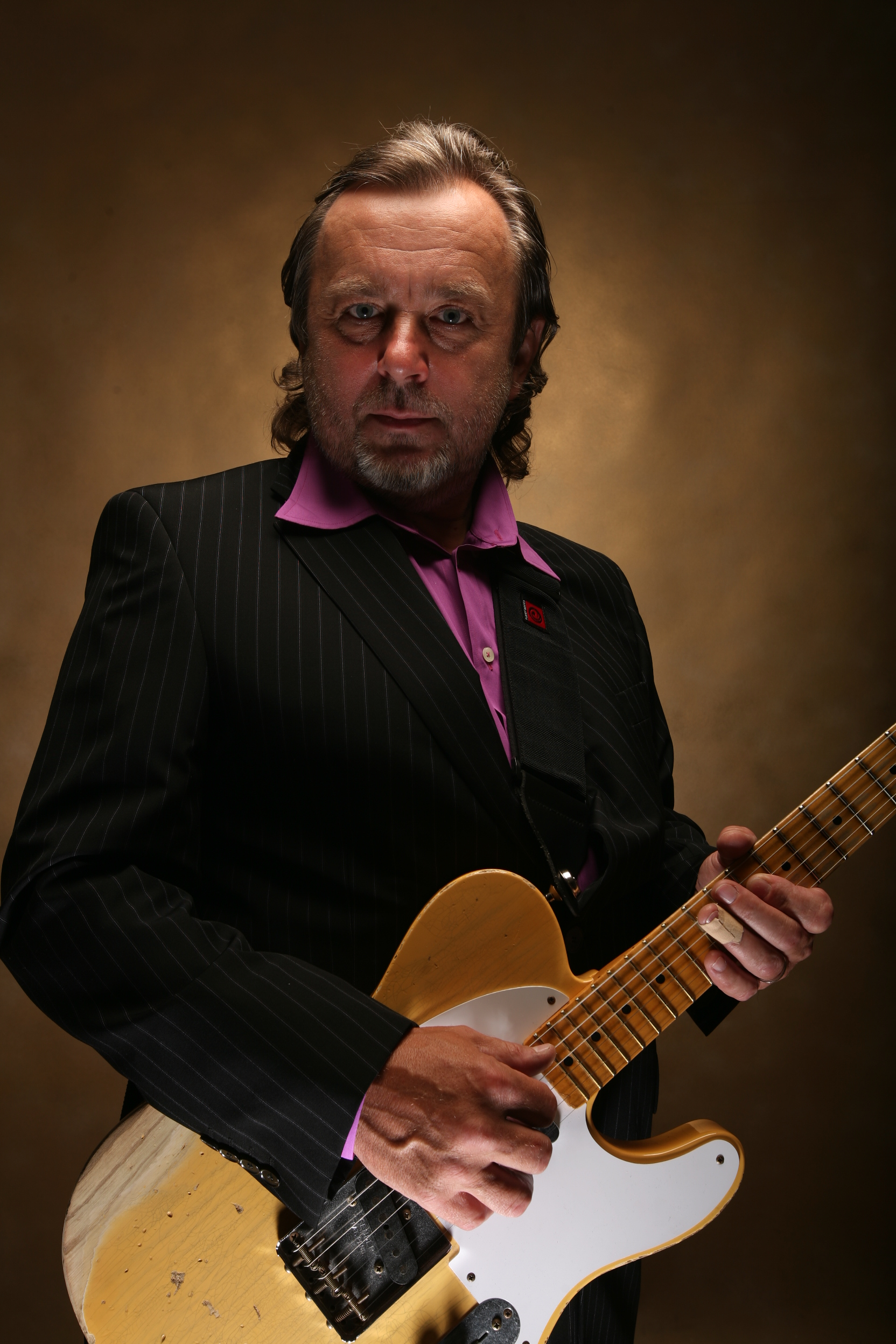
- Pavlíček in 2009

Background information
- Born: 14 February 1956 (age 70); Prague, Czechoslovakia
- Genres: Guitarist; composer; singer; lyricist
- Instruments: Guitar; vocals
- Years active: 1978–present
- Labels: Sony BMG; Warner; Supraphon; Universal
- Formerly of: Pražský výběr
- Website: michalpavlicek.com

Michal Pavlíček (born 14 February 1956) is a Czech guitarist, musical composer, singer, lyricist, and producer. He is considered to be an accomplished guitarist and holds numerous awards.

== Career ==
Pavlíček, a FAMU graduate, broke onto the music scene in the mid-1970s and made his name as part of the rock band Pražský výběr, who were officially banned in communist Czechoslovakia.

Pavlíček is also the founder of the bands Stromboli and Big Heads, and since 1992 has been a member of BSP, together with Kamil Střihavka and Ota Balage.

As a songwriter, Pavlíček has contributed to the careers of such artists as Bára Basiková, Zuzana Michnová, Monika Načeva, Jana Koubková, Daniel Hůlka, and Richard Müller. He has also composed music for various theatre productions, ballets, television shows, and feature films, including Václav Havel's Leaving.

In addition to working on local productions, the artist has also written music for several foreign shows, including the BBC's Merlin and The Scarlet Pimpernel.

Pavlíček has recorded a number of solo albums. He has been inducted into the Beatová síň slávy as well as winning the Anděl Award in 2015 for lifetime achievement.

In 2008, he published his autobiography, Země vzdálené (Faraway Lands).

== Selected discography ==
=== with Pražský výběr ===
- Žízeň (1978)
- Výběr (1987)
- Pražský výběr (1988)
- Běr (1997)

=== with Stromboli ===
- Stromboli (1987)
- Shutdown (1989)
- Fiat Lux (2014)

=== with Big Heads ===
- Big Heads (1992)
- Čombió (2001)

=== with BSP ===
- BSP I (1993)
- BSP II (1994)

=== Solo ===
- Minotaurus (1990)
- Strange Pleasure of Living (1991)
- Imagination (1992)
- Konec velkých prázdnin (1996)
- The Scarlet Pimpernel (1999)
- Zvláštní radost žít II (2002)
- Beatová síň slávy (2006)
- Srdeční záležitosti (2010)
- Pošli to tam! (2019)

=== Musicals and ballets ===
- Symphonic Variations (1997)
- Excalibur (2003)
- Obraz Doriana Graye (2005)
- Malý princ (2005)
- Dáma s kaméliemi (2007)
