= Tři sestry =

Czech rock band

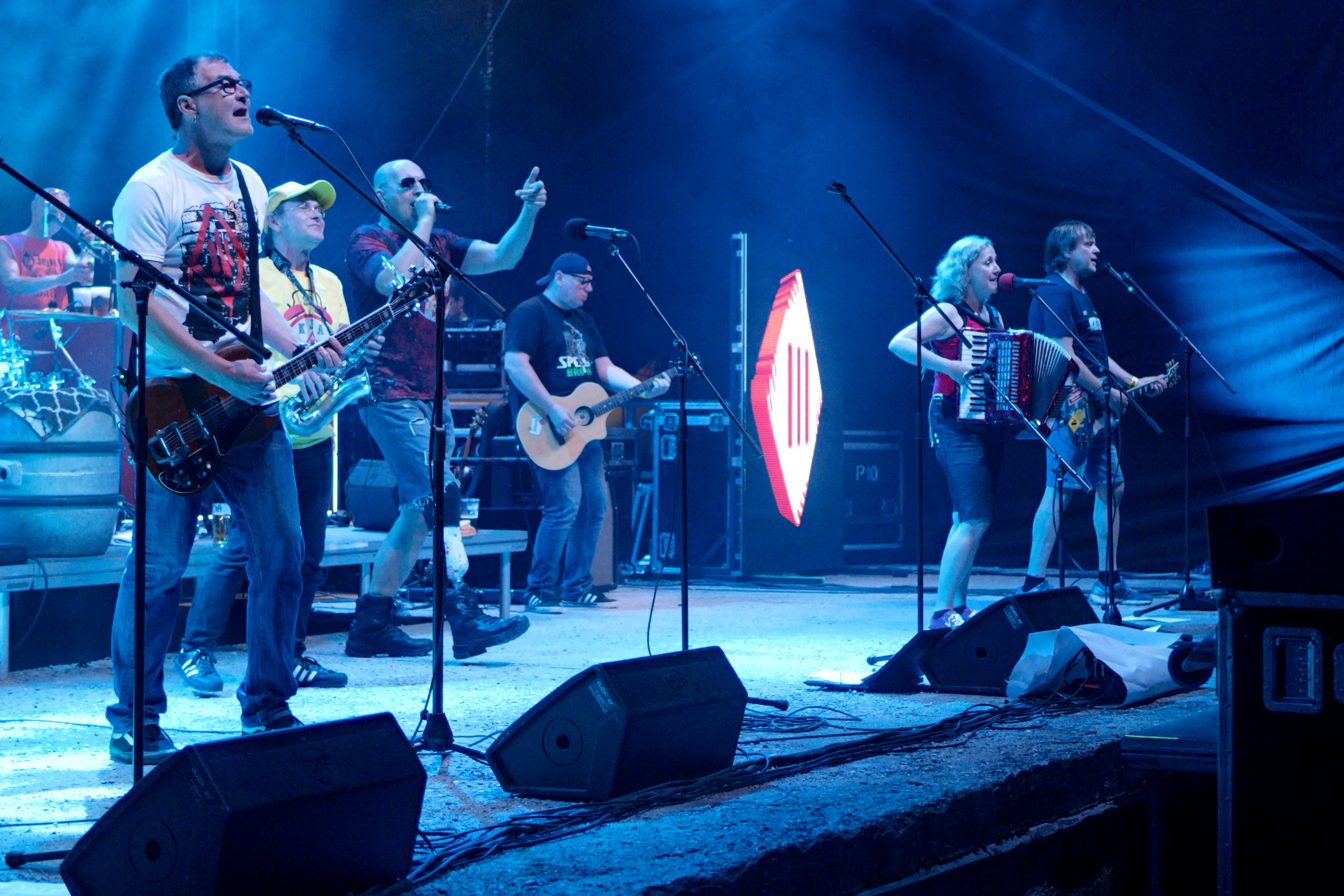
- Tři sestry performing in 2018

Background information
- Also known as: Ségry, Soubor kreténů
- Origin: Prague, Czechoslovakia
- Genres: Punk rock; pub rock
- Years active: 1985–present
- Spinoff of: Spálená tlumivka
- Members: Lou Fanánek Hagen; Veronika Borovková; Tomáš Doležal; Ronald Seitl; Zdeněk Petr; Rostislav Cerman; Petr Lukeš; Martin Roušar
- Past members: See Band members section
- Website: trisestry.cz

Tři sestry (Czech for "three sisters") is a Czech punk band formed in 1985 in Prague. Some of their later material has fallen into a more general rock genre, and they have also dabbled in hardcore punk. The band experienced the peak of their popularity in the 1990s and have played at the Masters of Rock music festival in 2005 and 2011. Their main songwriter and lead singer is Lou Fanánek Hagen. The other current members of the band are Veronika Borovková (harmonica, vocals), Tomáš Doležal (bass), Ronald Seitl (guitar), Zdeněk Petr (guitar), Rostislav Cerman (guitar), Petr Lukeš (drums), and Martin Roušar (saxophone, clarinet). Tři sestry have released more than twenty studio albums and a number of live recordings and compilations throughout their career.

== History ==
=== Beginning and peak years: 1985–1997 ===
In 1982, several members of what would go on to become Tři sestry played in a band called Spálená tlumivka. Tři sestry was formed in 1985 in Prague and originally consisted of Tomáš "Ing. Magor" Doležal (bass), Jiří "Hadr" Brábník (drums), Tomáš "Sup" Karásek (harmonica/accordion), and Petr "Dachau" Jírovec (guitar). The band soon hired three vocalists, Petr "Bombur" Kratochvíl, Simona "Síma" Bártová, and Lou Fanánek Hagen. By September 1987, only Fanánek was left behind the microphone. That year, the band added guitarist Luděk "Nikotýn" Pallat to their ranks and thus briefly included two guitars, until the departure of Jírovec at the end of 1987.

The band recorded a demo in 1988, titled Rarity, which wasn't released until 1995. They published their debut album, Na Kovárně to je nářez, in 1990, and followed it by several more through the rest of the decade. They added violinist František "Káca" Kacafírek to their ranks in 1993. That year, original harmonica/accordion player, Sup, was replaced by Miloš "Sup II" Berka. In 1994, guitarist Nikotýn left and was replaced by Ronald "Kapitán Korkorán"/"Pekelná ruka" Seitl and a returning František Sahula. The band suffered a major loss in January 1996, when drummer Hadr died. He was replaced a year later by Petr "Bubenec"/"Franta Vrána" Lukeš. That same year also saw the departure of Sup II, who was replaced by Veronika "Supice" Borovková. Sahula left the ensemble again in 1997, and Miroslav "Cvanc" Cvanciger took his place.

=== 21st century ===
On 10 June 2000, the group celebrated its fifteenth birthday with a concert on Štvanice island, in Prague. At the turn of the millennium and then again in 2003 and 2004, Sahula briefly rejoined the band. In 2003, they added guitarist Zdeněk "Zdenál" Petr. At this point, the band consisted of Lou Fanánek Hagen, Ing. Magor, Franta Vrána, Supice, Ronald Seitl, Zdeněk Petr, Martin Roušar (saxophone, clarinet), and František Kacafírek on violin (whose career with the band ended upon his death, in 2016). On 1–2 May 2008, Sahula was murdered.

In 2011, Tři sestry were inducted into the Beat Hall of Fame. A decade later, they released the album Sex drógy rokenról, on which they covered songs by prominent punk musicians that inspired their career, such as Iggy Pop, Dead Boys, the Adicts, Sham 69, the Damned, Peter and the Test Tube Babies, and the Velvet Underground.

== Other activities ==
Apart from playing music, Tři sestry have jointly engaged in a number of sports. There is a Tři sestry sailing team that participates in international yacht races in many countries, and there are also band-affiliated football and hockey teams, 1.RFC SPARK and HC Stará kovárna, respectively. The band also organizes tennis, skiing, and cycling competitions.

== Band members ==
Current

- Lou Fanánek Hagen – vocals; occasional drums, saxophone, bass, percussion (1985–present)
- Tomáš "Ing. Magor" Doležal – bass (1985–88; 1989–present)
- Veronika "Supice" Borovková – harmonica, vocals (1996–present)
- Ronald "Kapitán Korkorán"/"Pekelná ruka" Seitl – guitar (1994–present)
- Zdeněk "Zdenál" Petr – guitar (2003–present)
- Rostislav "Rosťa" Cerman – guitar
- Petr "Bubenec"/"Franta Vrána" Lukeš – drums (1996–present)
- Martin "Jaroušek" Roušar – saxophone, clarinet

Past

- Petr "Bombur"/"Václav Kahuda" Kratochvíl – vocals (1985–1987)
- Petr "Dachau" Jírovec – guitar (1985–1987)
- Simona "Síma" Bártová – vocals (1985–1987)
- Tomáš "Sup" Karásek – harmonica (1985–1993)
- Jiří "Hadr" Brábník – drums (1985–1996)
- Luděk "Nikotýn" Pallat – guitar (1987–1994)
- Jakub "Blázen" Maleček – bass (1988–1991)
- František Sahula – guitar, vocals (1988–1997; 2000; 2003–04)
- Miloš "Sup II" Berka – harmonica (1993–1996)
- František "Káca" Kacafírek – violin (1993–2016)
- Miroslav "Cvanc" Cvanciger – guitar (1997–2003)

== Discography ==
Studio albums

- Na Kovárně to je nářez (1990)
- Alkáč je největší kocour, aneb několik písní o lásce (1991)
- Švédská trojka (1993)
- 25:01 (1993)
- Hudba z marsu (1995)
- Rarity (1995)
- Zlatí hoši (1996)
- Průša se vrací (1998)
- Průša se vrací + 3x bonus (1998)
- Soubor kreténů (1999)
- Hlavně že je večírek — 15 let Souboru kreténů (2000)
- Do Evropy nechceme — Tři sestry a Krakonoš (2002)
- Lihová škola umění, aneb Válka s loky (2003)
- Na eXX (2005)
- Rocková nadílka od Tří sester a Divokýho Billa – split album with Divokej Bill (2007)
- Mydlovary (2007)
- Lázničky (2010)
- Z garáže (2011)
- Líná hudba, holý neštěstí (2013)
- Bratia & Sestry – split album with Horkýže Slíže (2013)
- Fernet Underground (2015)
- ¡Svobodu ředkvičkám! (2018)
- Sex drógy rokenról (covers album, 2021)
- Pub art (2025)

Compilations

- 15 let jsem Na Kovárně na plech (2000)
- 20 let naživu (2006)
- Platinum Collection (2007)
- 25 let na Džbáně (2010)
- Fernet Underground VIP Collection (2015)
- Fernet Underground VIP Collection Plus Best of 2001–15 (2015)
- Platinum MaXXXimum (2020)

Live albums

- Beatová síň slávy (together with Visací zámek) (2009)
- V aréně (2011)
- "30" v ještě větší Aréně (2016)
- Vinyl Tour Live 2022–1992 (2022)

Box sets

- Superlázničky (2011)
- 30 BOX (2014)

DVDs

- 20 let naživu (2006)
- Beatová síň slávy (together with Visací zámek) (2009)
- 25 let na Džbáně (2010)
- V aréně (2011)
- O2 Aréna Live (2016)
