= Kamil Střihavka =

Czech singer and musical actor

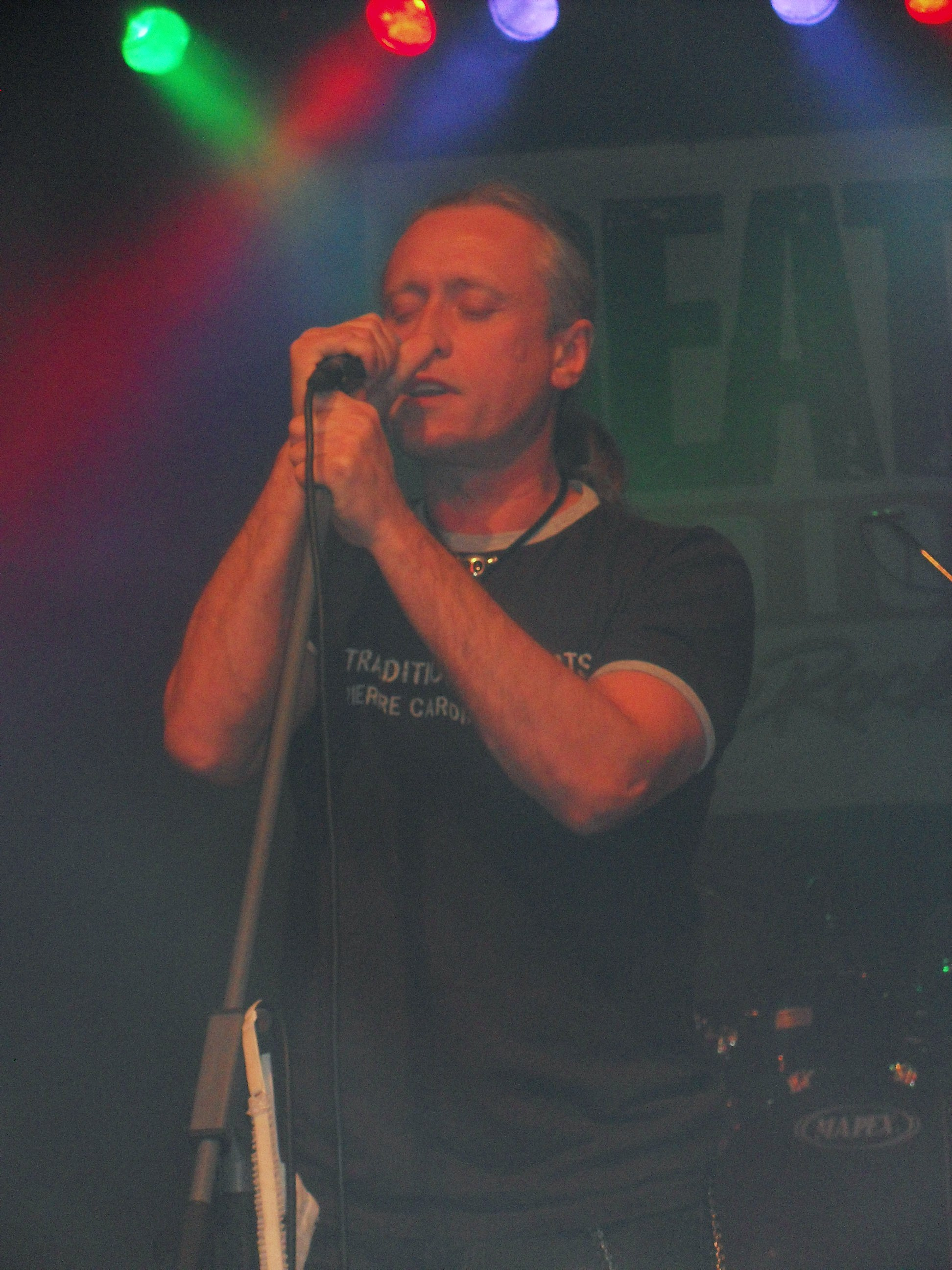
- Střihavka in 2011

Background information
- Born: 20 January 1965 (age 61); Osek, Czechoslovakia
- Genres: Rock; metal
- Occupations: Singer; musical actor
- Instrument: Vocals
- Years active: 1986–present
- Member of: Kamil Střihavka & Leaders!
- Formerly of: Motorband, BSP
- Website: strihavka.cz

Kamil Střihavka (born 20 January 1965) is a Czech rock singer and musical actor. In 1986, he became a member of the power metal group Motorband. In 1992, he formed BSP with Ota Balage and Michal Pavlíček. He has also released several solo projects and sung in many musicals. In 2015, he was inducted into the Beatová síň slávy.

== Biography ==
Střihavka graduated in electrical engineering in Varnsdorf in 1983. In 1986, he started singing with the power metal group Motorband. He later switched from power metal to hard rock. In 1992, he cofounded the trio BSP (Balage, Střihavka, Pavlíček). The group went on hiatus in 2006 and reformed in 2011. They have released two studio albums to date, BSP I (1993) and BSP II (1994).

Střihavka has performed in numerous stage musicals, including the Czech adaptation of the rock opera Jesus Christ Superstar at the former Divadlo Spirála in Prague. He performed the musical multiple times at this location between 1994 and 1998. Other musicals which Střihavka has been part of include Joan of Arc and Excalibur. He also sang the official anthem of the football club FK Teplice.

the artist leads his own band, named Kamil Střihavka & Leaders! Since November 2010, he has been performing Jesus Christ Superstar at the Musical Theatre Karlín. He is additionally a member of the musical theatre RockOpera Praha, with whom he has performed a variety of productions including Romeo and Juliet, Joan of Arc, and Robin Hood.

In 2015, he founded the Kamil Střihavka Theatre Company.

He has released two solo albums, Woo-Doo in 2002 and 365 in 2008.

== Personal life ==
Kamil is married and has two daughters.

== Selected discography ==
=== with Motorband ===
- Made in Germany (1990)

=== with BSP ===
- BSP I (1993)
- BSP II (1994)
- The Best of BSP (Live at Retro Music Hall) (2008)

=== Kamil Střihavka & Zdeněk Mazač ===
- No Guitars! (1995)
- No Guitars...? (1998)

=== RockOpera Praha ===
- Oidipus Tyranus (2011)
- 7 proti Thébám (2014)

=== Solo ===
- Woo-Doo (2002)
- 365 (2008)
- Kamil Střihavka 20 let na scéně – compilation of previous works (2009)
