= Dragun (surname) =

Dragun, Draguns (Latvian variant) or Drahun (Belarusian and Ukrainian variant; Cyrillic: Драгун). The Slovak variant of the word: Dragúň. Notable people with the surname include:

- Aksana Drahun (born 1981), Belarusian sprinter
- Anton Dragúň (born 1942), football player and manager from Slovakia
- Charmaine Dragun (1978–2007), Australian broadcast journalist and presenter
- Dmitri Dragun (born 1994), Russian ice dancer
- Kamil Dragun (born 1995), Polish chess grandmaster
- Nikita Dragun (born 1996), American YouTuber, make-up artist, and model
- Osvaldo Dragún (1929–1999), Argentine playwright
- Stanislaw Drahun (born 1988), Belarusian football player
- Vladimirs Draguns (born 1972), Latvian football midfielder

== See also ==
- Dragoun
