= Malé Žernoseky =

Municipality in the Czech Republic

- Municipality
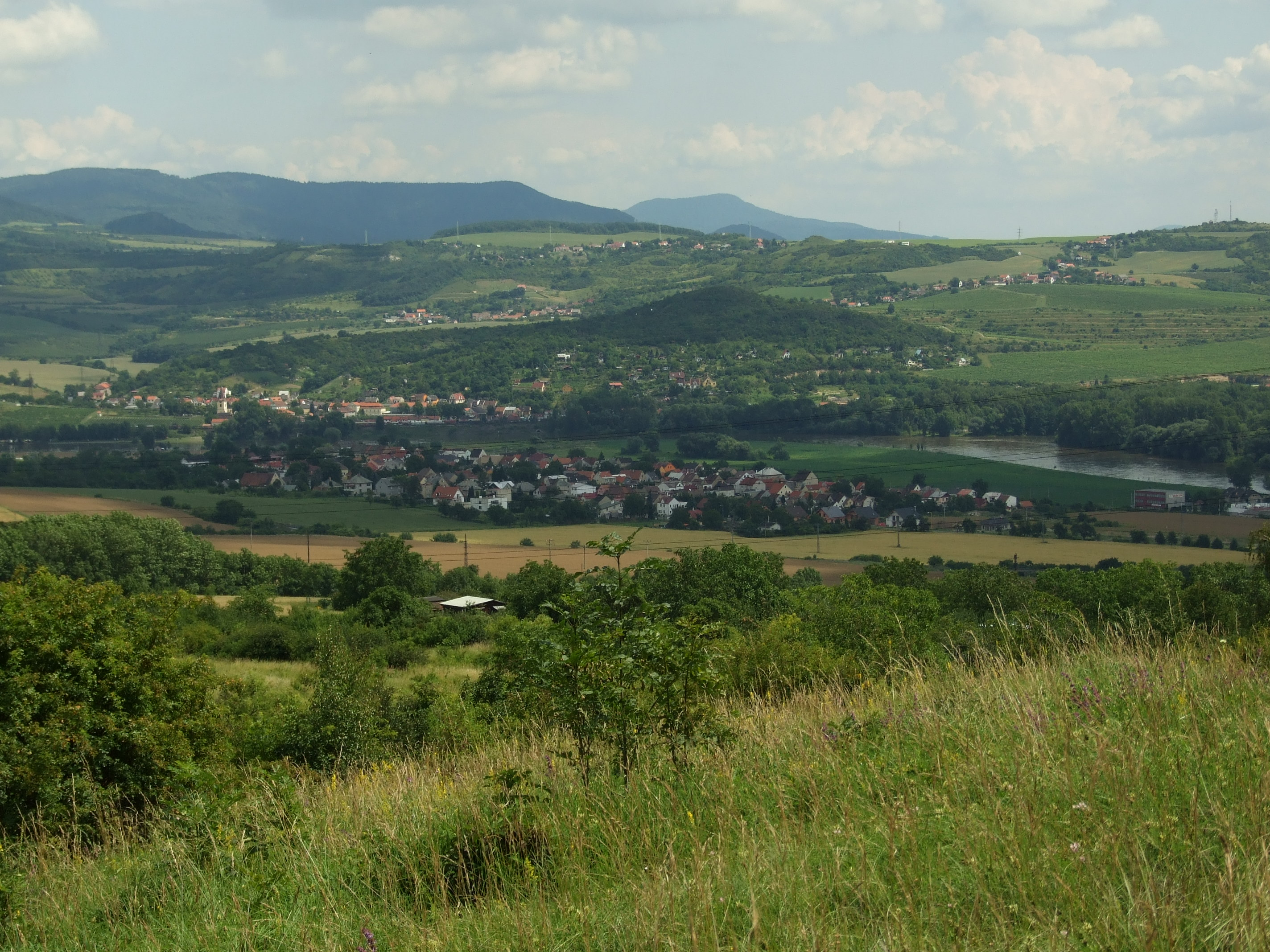
- General view from the Lovoš hill

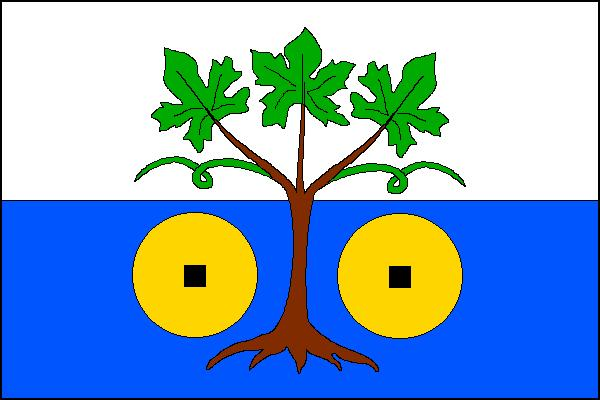
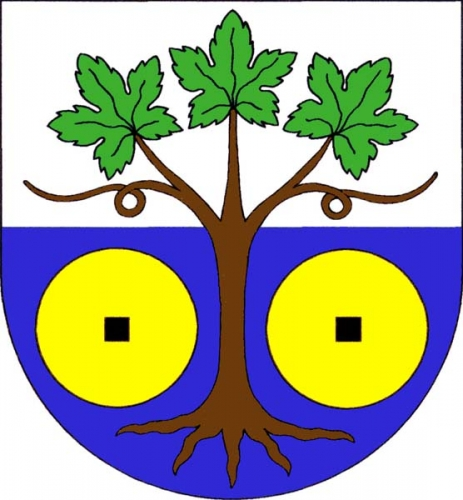
- Flag Coat of arms

- Location in the Czech Republic
- Coordinates: 50°32′3″N 14°3′17″E
- Country: Czech Republic
- Region: Ústí nad Labem
- District: Litoměřice
- First mentioned: 1057

Area
  - Total: 3.32 km^{2} (1.28 sq mi)
- Elevation: 159 m (522 ft)

Population (2026-01-01)
  - Total: 728
  - Density: 219/km^{2} (568/sq mi)
- Time zone: UTC+1 (CET)
  - Summer (DST): UTC+2 (CEST)
- Postal code: 410 02
- Website: www.malezernoseky.cz

Malé Žernoseky is a municipality and village in Litoměřice District in the Ústí nad Labem Region of the Czech Republic. It has about 700 inhabitants.

Malé Žernoseky lies approximately 5 kilometres (3 mi) west of Litoměřice, 14 km (9 mi) south of Ústí nad Labem, and 57 km (35 mi) north-west of Prague.

== Demographics ==
Historical population
Year	Pop.	±%
1869	364	—
1880	355	−2.5%
1890	369	+3.9%
1900	367	−0.5%
1910	390	+6.3%
1921	412	+5.6%
1930	1,029	+149.8%
1950	785	−23.7%
1961	850	+8.3%
1970	758	−10.8%
1980	674	−11.1%
1991	600	−11.0%
2001	669	+11.5%
2011	700	+4.6%
2021	684	−2.3%
Source: Censuses
