= Roman Dragoun =

Czech musician (born 1956)

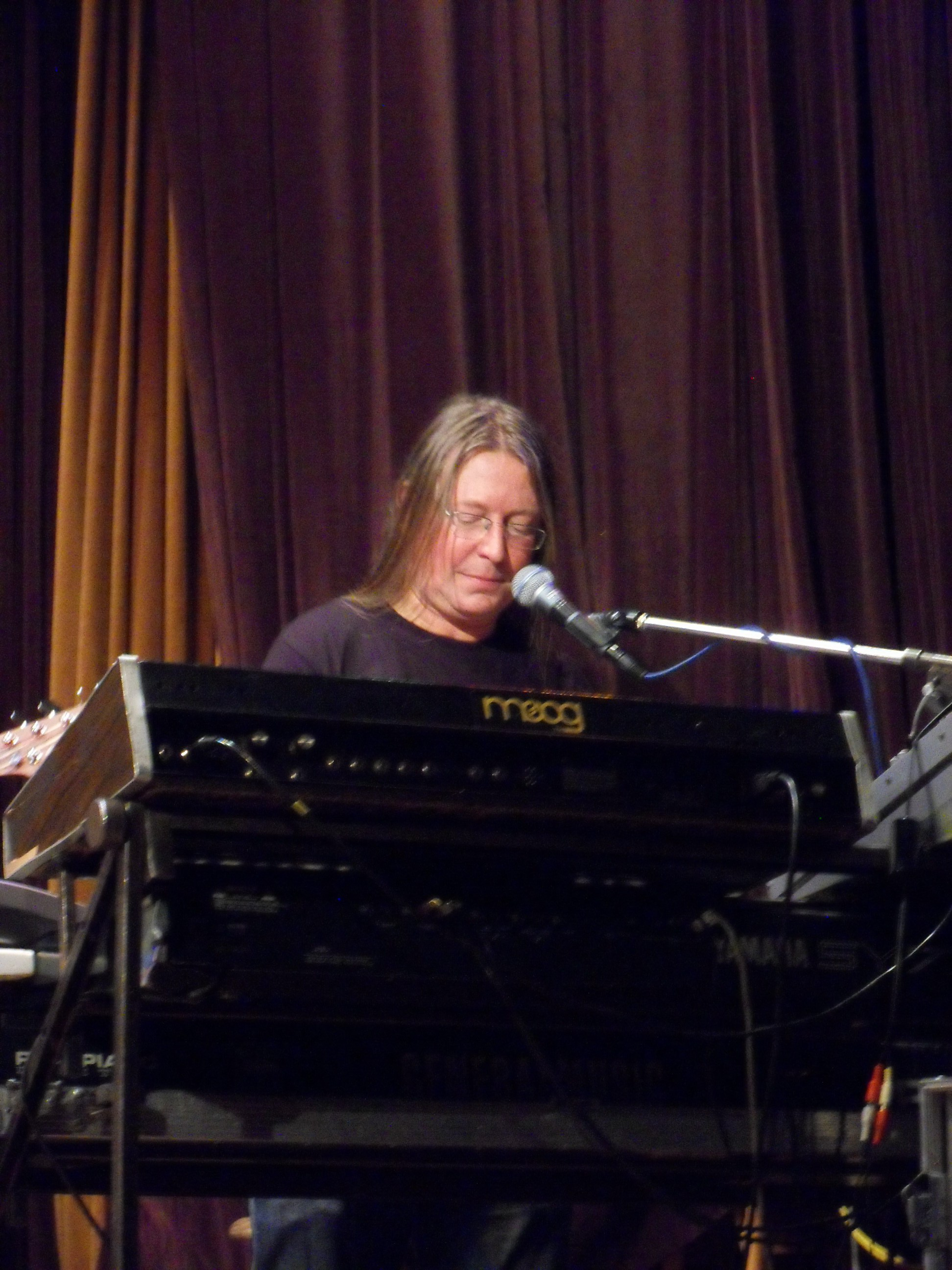
- Dragoun in 2009

Background information
- Born: 8 April 1956 (age 70); Písek, Czechoslovakia
- Genres: Progressive rock; art rock; hard rock; jazz fusion
- Occupations: Musician; songwriter
- Instruments: Keyboards; synthesizer; vocals
- Years active: 1970s–present
- Formerly of: Progres 2; Futurum; Stromboli; T4
- Website: romandragoun.cz

Roman Dragoun (born 8 April 1956) is a Czech singer, songwriter, and keyboardist. From 1980 to 1983 and again since 2007, he has been a member of the band Progres 2. He has also been a member of Stromboli, T4, and Futurum. He has additionally been a session player for a number of other musicians, and he has sung in musical theatre. In 2012, Dragoun was inducted into the Beatová síň slávy.

He is the son of the painter František Roman Dragoun.

== Discography ==
=== Solo ===
- Stín mý krve (1995)
- Slunci blíž (2000)
- Otlučená srdce (2009)

=== with Progres 2 ===
- Třetí kniha džunglí (1982)
- The Third Book of the Jungle (1983)
- Progres Story 1968 – 2008 (2008)

=== with Futurum ===
- Ostrov země (1984)
- Jedinečná šance (1987)
- Ostrov země/Jedinečná šance (2005)
- 25. narozeniny (2009)

=== with Stromboli ===
- Shutdown (1989)

=== with T4 ===
- Pár tónů a slov (2005)
