= Pražský výběr =

Czech rock band

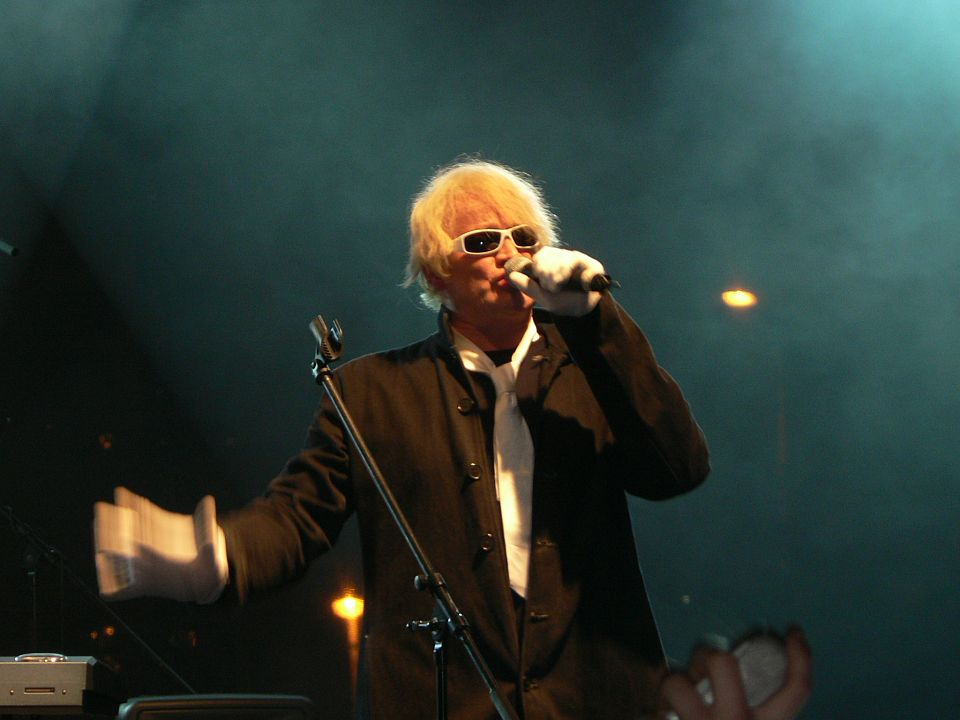
- Michael Kocáb, 2005

Background information
- Origin: Prague, Czechoslovakia
- Years active: 1976–2006; 2012–present
- Label: Sony BMG
- Members: Michael Kocáb; Michal Pavlíček; Vilém Čok; Klaudius Kryšpín; Jiří Hrubeš
- Past members: Ondřej Soukup; Jiří Tomek; Richard Scheufler; Ladislav Faktor; Glenn Proudfoot; Zlata Kinská; Miloš "Dodo" Doležal
- Website: prazskyvyber.com

Pražský výběr is a Czech rock band formed in 1976 in Prague by keyboardist and singer Michael Kocáb. The band initially played jazz fusion in the 1970s, which was popular at the time. At the beginning of the 1980s, they changed their style and became one of the most influential new wave bands in Czechoslovakia. Between the years 1983 and 1986, they were banned by the Communist regime, and it wasn't until the second half of the decade that they returned to performing and releasing new material.

They disbanded in 2006 due to disagreements between the two band leaders, Kocáb and Michal Pavlíček. Kocáb started a new band, called Pražský výběr II, which performed until 2009. In 2012, the original Pražský výběr reunited. The band has released four studio albums since their inception in 1976. Žízeň (1978), Výběr (1987), Pražský výběr (1988; also known as Straka v hrsti), and Běr (1997).

== History ==
Singer and keyboard player Michael Kocáb formed Pražský výběr in 1976 after leaving the jazz group Prague Big Band, and they played jazz fusion for the first few years. Their debut album, Žízeň, came out in 1978 and reflected the band's signature genre. They were joined towards the end of the 1970s by Michal Pavlíček, a classically trained guitarist who was already known on the music scene as a proficient musician. Thanks to Pavlíček, Pražský výběr became influenced by new wave music and hard rock, and their subsequent compositions followed this style, with hints of punk added in. The band was rounded out by bass player Ondřej Soukup and drummer Jiří Tomek.

In 1981, Soukup left Pražský výběr to join Karel Gott's backing band. He was replaced by Vilém Čok. Tomek also departed and Jiří Hrubeš took over on drums, stabilizing the band's lineup for a few years.

In 1982, director Juraj Herz made the film Straka v hrsti in collaboration with Pražský výběr, who provided the soundtrack. This inspired the band's second album, which they recorded that same year but did not release until 1988, due to a prohibition placed upon them by the Czechoslovak government, effectively banning them from performing or releasing any material. The band went on an indefinite hiatus in 1983 due to this ban, and drummer Hrubeš emigrated.

When the ban was lifted in 1986, the group reformed under the name Výběr. They released an eponymous album in 1987, followed by the shelved project Straka v hrsti, officially released under the title Pražský výběr, a year later. In 1991, the group staged a concert to celebrate the departure of Soviet troops from Czechoslovakia. The performance was recorded and released the same year under the name Adieu C.A. The concert included a guest appearance by Frank Zappa.

Pražský výběr's fourth album, Běr, came out in 1997. The band was inducted into the Czech Rock Hall of Fame, known as Beatová síň slávy, in 2005, and a year later they split up due to internal divisions.

Michael Kocáb then launched his new project, titled Pražský výběr II, composed of bass player Richard Scheufler, vocalist Zlata Kinská, drummer Klaudius Kryšpín, and guitarist Glenn Proudfoot. The group performed in this lineup for three years until 2009.

In April 2012, the original Pražský výběr announced a reunion and played five concerts in the autumn of the same year. They went on tour with two drummers, Jiří Hrubeš and Klaudius Kryšpín.

In 2015, Michal Pavlíček won an Anděl Award for lifetime achievement. In December of the following year, Pražský výběr played their biggest concert ever, performing at Prague's O2 Arena. They were joined onstage by Ondřej Soukup, Iva Pazderková, and Vojtěch Dyk.

On 4 July 2018, Pražský výběr opened for The Rolling Stones at Letňany airport in Prague.

== Band members ==
Current

- Michael Kocáb – vocals, keyboards
- Michal Pavlíček – guitar, vocals
- Vilém Čok – bass, vocals
- Klaudius Kryšpín – drums
- Jiří Hrubeš – drums

Past

- Ondřej Soukup – bass
- Jiří Tomek – drums, percussion
- Richard Scheufler – bass
- Ladislav Faktor - keyboards
- Glenn Proudfoot – guitar
- Zlata Kinská – vocals
- Miloš "Dodo" Doležal – guitar

== Discography ==
=== Pražský výběr ===
Studio albums

- Žízeň (1978)
- Výběr (1987)
- Straka v hrsti (1988)
- Běr (1997)

EPs

- Mini Jazz Klub 17 (1978)

Live albums

- Adieu C.A. (1992)
- Beatová síň slávy (2005)

Compilations

- Komplet (1995)
- Tango Ropotámo (1998)
- Habaděj (1999)
- Beatová síň slávy (2005)

=== Pražský výběr II ===
Studio albums

- Vymlácený rockový palice (2007)
