= Semilasso =

Cultural centre in Brno, Czechia

Coordinates: 49.228125°N 16.593153°E

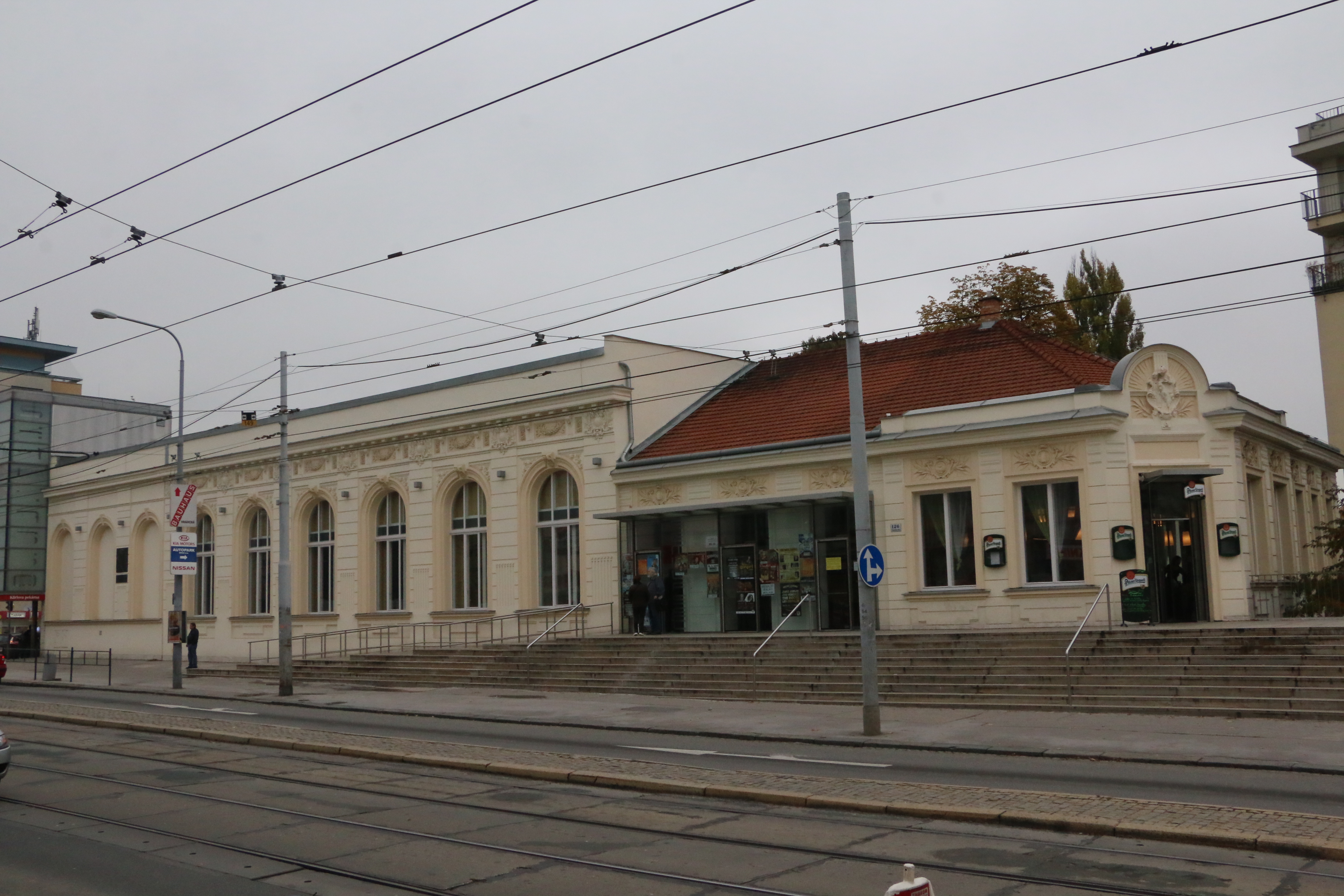
An image of Semilasso

Semilasso is a cultural centre in the Královo Pole district of Brno, Czech Republic, which takes its name from the former public house U Semilassa, once known as the Morgensternův hostinec, which was renamed about 1836 in tribute to Prince Hermann von Pückler-Muskau (1785–1871). Semilasso is the nom-de-plume adopted by this famous German traveller and landscape gardener for his autobiographical travel books.
