= Krucipüsk =

Czech metal band

- Origin: Liberec, Czechoslovakia
- Genres: Thrash metal; crossover thrash; heavy metal
- Years active: 1991–present
- Labels: Monitor; Popron; Sokol Power Voices; EMI-Monitor
- Members: Tomáš Hajíček; David Pavlík; Josef Křeček; Tomáš Hajíček Jr.
- Past members: Petr Zadražil; Petr Paulus; Petr Slavík; Jan Zrůst; Aleš Makyta; Karel Adam; Tomáš Marek; Robin Davídek; Josef Cigánek; Daniel Hafstein; Vojtěch Douda; René Rypar; Jaryn Janek; Jarmut Gabriel; Maťo Ivan; Milan Cimfe; Marek Haruštiak; Richard Scheufler; Jiří Zika; Matěj Čejchan; Peter Boška
- Website: krucipusk.cz

Krucipüsk is a Czech metal band founded in 1991 in the city of Liberec. Its only permanent member is vocalist Tomáš Hajíček. As of 2023, the band has released twelve studio albums and a live DVD.

== History ==
=== Formation and first lineup: 1991–1997 ===
In 1991, vocalist Tomáš Hajíček formed the thrash metal band Krucipüsk in the city of Liberec, together with Petr Zadražil (guitar), Petr Slavík (bass), and Jan Zrůst (drums). They were soon joined by Petr Paulus, on second guitar. The band released their debut studio album, Ratata, in 1992. Their sophomore record, Cirkus dneska nebude, came out in 1996.

=== Subsequent lineups and releases: 1997–present ===
In 1997, the band's lineup changed, with only Hajíček remaining from the original band. Aleš Makyta joined on guitar, Karel Adam (Vitacit, Kreyson) on bass, and Tomáš Marek on drums. A year later, Krucipüsk released their third album, Bigada Bigada Baby. Further lineup changes followed, and between 2001 and 2019, the band published nine studio albums and one live DVD.

== Band members ==
Current

- Tomáš Hajíček – vocals (1991–present)
- David Pavlík – guitar, vocals (2021–present)
- Josef Křeček – bass, vocals (2017–present)
- Tomáš Hajíček Jr. – drums (2017–present)

Past

- Petr Zadražil – guitar (1991–97)
- Petr Paulus – guitar (1991–97)
- Petr Slavík – bass (1991–97)
- Jan Zrůst – drums (1991–97)
- Aleš Makyta – guitar (1997–99)
- Karel Adam – bass (1997–2002)
- Tomáš Marek – drums (1997–99)
- Robin Davídek – guitar (1999–2002)
- Josef Cigánek – drums (1999–2000)
- Daniel Hafstein – drums (2000–02)
- Vojtěch Douda – drums (2002–17)
- René Rypar – guitar (2002–05)
- Jaryn Janek – bass (2002–05)
- Jarmut Gabriel – guitar (2005–17)
- Maťo Ivan – bass (2005–06)
- Milan Cimfe – bass (2006–07)
- Marek Haruštiak – bass (2007–11)
- Richard Scheufler – bass (2011–15)
- Jiří Zika – bass (2015–17)
- Matěj Čejchan – guitar (2017–18)
- Peter Boška – guitar (2019–21)

== Discography ==
Studio albums

- Ratata (1992)
- Cirkus dneska nebude (1996)
- Bigada Bigada Baby (1998)
- ~4~ (2001)
- Druide! (2004)
- Ahoj (2007)
- Amen (2009)
- Rodinnej diktát (2012)
- Boombay (2013)
- Tintili-Vantili (2015)
- Sine Amore Nihil (2017)
- Country Hell (2019)

Live albums

- Pardon (DVD – 2007)
