= Statenice =

Municipality in the Czech Republic

- Municipality
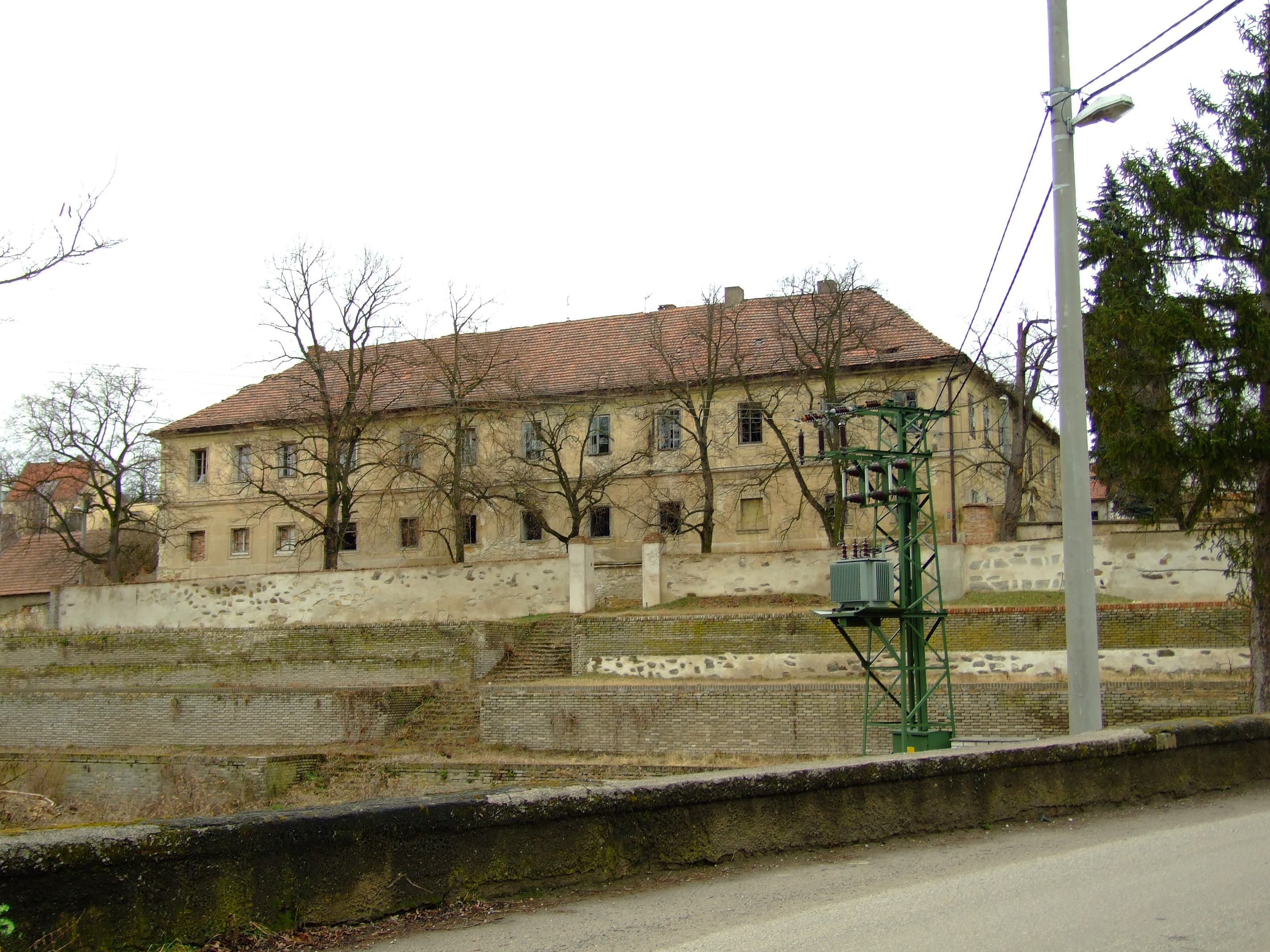
- Castle building waiting for reconstruction

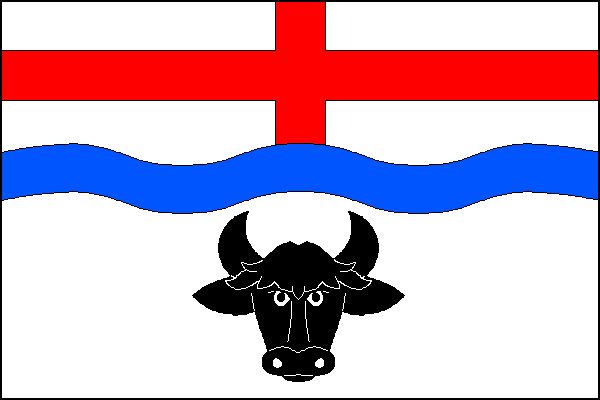
- Flag Coat of arms

- Location in the Czech Republic
- Coordinates: 50°8′34″N 14°19′7″E
- Country: Czech Republic
- Region: Central Bohemian
- District: Prague-West
- First mentioned: 1227

Area
  - Total: 3.79 km^{2} (1.46 sq mi)
- Elevation: 258 m (846 ft)

Population (2026-01-01)
  - Total: 1,649
  - Density: 435/km^{2} (1,130/sq mi)
- Time zone: UTC+1 (CET)
  - Summer (DST): UTC+2 (CEST)
- Postal code: 252 62
- Website: www.statenice.cz

Statenice is a municipality and village in Prague-West District in the Central Bohemian Region of the Czech Republic. It has about 1,600 inhabitants.

== Administrative division ==
Statenice consists of two municipal parts (in brackets population according to the 2021 census):

- Statenice (1,141)
- Černý Vůl (762)

== Demographics ==
Historical population
Year	Pop.	±%
1869	533	—
1880	603	+13.1%
1890	658	+9.1%
1900	648	−1.5%
1910	667	+2.9%
1921	618	−7.3%
1930	638	+3.2%
1950	527	−17.4%
1961	647	+22.8%
1970	602	−7.0%
1980	591	−1.8%
1991	524	−11.3%
2001	663	+26.5%
2011	1,533	+131.2%
2021	1,903	+24.1%
Source: Censuses
