= František Roman Dragoun =

Czech portrait painter (1916–2005)

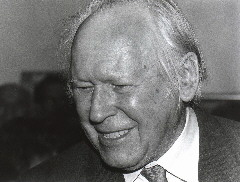
Dragoun in 1996

František Roman Dragoun (1916–2005) was a Czech portrait painter from Písek. He created over five thousand paintings and drawings throughout his career, and was also a poet. His son, Roman Dragoun, is a progressive rock musician.

== See also ==
- List of Czech painters
