= Lou Fanánek Hagen =

Czech musician (born 1966)

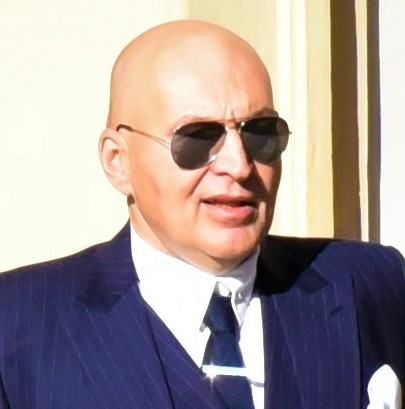
- Moravec in 2019

Background information
- Born: František Moravec; 18 June 1966 (age 60); Prague, Czechoslovakia
- Genres: Pub rock; punk rock
- Occupations: Musician; composer; lyricist
- Instruments: Vocals; drums; saxophone; bass; percussion
- Years active: 1985—present
- Member of: Tři sestry
- Formerly of: Hagen Baden

Lou Fanánek Hagen (real name František Moravec, born 18 June 1966) is a Czech musician, composer, lyricist, and frontman of the punk band Tři sestry.

== Career ==
=== Tři sestry ===
In 1985, František Moravec became the singer and frontman of the punk band Tři sestry and adopted the moniker Lou Fanánek Hagen, naming himself after his two idols, Nina Hagen and Lou Reed. He has remained with the band throughout their career. In 2021, they released their latest album, titled Sex drógy rokenról.

=== Other activities ===
After the Velvet Revolution, Hagen began composing songs for Těžkej Pokondr, as well as for other well-known artists, such as Karel Gott, Lucie Bílá, Hana Zagorová, Věra Špinarová, and Maxim Turbulenc.

Between 1992 and 1993, he fronted the punk band Hagen Baden with David Matásek from Orlík. The group also included Jakub Maleček, Ronald Seitl, and Martin Roubínek. They released two albums: Hagen Baden (1992) and Ahoj kluci (1993).

In 2001, he participated in the composition of the libretto for the Czech musical Kleopatra. He has also collaborated on a number of musicals with Michal David. In 2009, he was inducted into the Beatová síň slávy.

== Personal life ==
Moravec was born in Prague. After high school, he attended the faculty of civil engineering of the Czech Technical University, where he obtained the title of engineer. He also studied interdisciplinary journalism at Charles University.

In 1986, while crossing a set of train tracks at Veleslavín station, Moravec was hit by a train, causing him to lose his lower right leg. He has worn a prosthesis ever since.

In the mid-1990s, he self-published an autobiographical book titled Tak to bylo, tak to je…, which was reissued in 2007. He followed it in 2010 with his second book, Járo, kakao!

Moravec has a total of five children, from two marriages.
