= List of Czech musicians =

The following is a partial list of Czech musical artists, not including classical musicians.

== A ==
- Luboš Andršt

== B ==
- Monika Bagárová
- Robert Balzar
- Dan Bárta
- Martina Bárta
- Václav Noid Bárta
- Bára Basiková
- Big Boss
- Lucie Bílá
- Věra Bílá
- Iva Bittová
- Pavel Bobek
- Vratislav Brabenec
- Aleš Brichta

== C ==
- Boris Carloff
- František Ringo Čech
- Albert Černý
- Martin Chodúr
- Benny Cristo
- Ilona Csáková

== D ==
- Michal David
- Debbi
- DJ Wich
- Jindra Dolanský
- Miloš "Dodo" Doležal
- Zbyněk Drda
- Karel Duba
- Lenka Dusilová

== F ==
- Ewa Farna
- Iva Frühlingová

== G ==
- Karel Gott
- Gabriela Gunčíková

== H ==
- Lou Fanánek Hagen
- Jan Hammer
- Petr Hapka
- Ondřej Havelka
- Jan Sahara Hedl
- Hana Hegerová
- Ondřej Hejma
- Radim Hladík
- Beata Hlavenková
- Milan Hlavsa
- Hana Horká
- Jan Hrubý
- Michal Hrůza
- Barbora Hrzánová
- Daniel Hůlka
- Jaroslav Hutka

== I ==
- Markéta Irglová

== J ==
- Ladislav Jakl
- Dalibor Janda
- Marta Jandová
- Oldřich Janota
- Petra Janů
- Josef Janíček
- Jaroslav Ježek
- Mikolas Josef

== K ==
- Jiří Kabeš
- Tomas Kalnoky
- Joe Karafiát
- Svatopluk Karásek
- Tereza Kerndlová
- Klara
- Tomáš Klus
- Michael Kocáb
- Vladimír Kokolia
- Petr Kolář
- David Koller
- Jiří Korn
- Ivan Král
- Martin Kratochvíl
- Anna K
- Karel Kryl
- Ladislav Křížek
- Marta Kubišová
- Vladimír Kulhánek

== L ==
- Daniel Landa
- Aneta Langerová
- Janek Ledecký
- Lenny
- Petr Lexa
- Olga Lounová

== M ==
- Leoš Mareš
- David Matásek
- Waldemar Matuška
- Vladimír Merta
- Vladimír Mišík
- Ivan Mládek
- Petr Muk

== N ==
- Zuzana Navarová
- Robert Nebřenský
- Václav Neckář
- Jaroslav Jeroným Neduha
- Jiří Neduha
- Jaromír Nohavica
- Petr Novák

== P ==
- Vladimír Padrůněk
- Pam Rabbit
- Michal Pavlíček
- Ivo Pešák
- Ota Petřina
- Eva Pilarová
- Petr Placák
- Josef Antonín Plánický
- Karel Plíhal
- Barbora Poláková
- Luboš Pospíšil
- Friederike Proch Benesch

== R ==
- Radůza
- Barbora Řeháčková
- Vlasta Redl
- Zdeněk Rytíř
- Řezník

== S ==
- Jiří Schelinger
- Richard Scheufler
- Jiří Schmitzer
- Jaroslav Erno Šedivý
- Pavel Sedláček
- Ivan Sekyra
- Petr Skoumal
- Jiří Šlitr
- Milan Smrčka
- Viktor Sodoma
- Ondřej Soukup
- Petr Spálený
- František Štorm
- Jiří Stivín
- Kamil Střihavka
- Marek Štryncl
- Jarda Svoboda

== T ==
- Luciana Tomášová
- Vlastimil Třešňák
- Michal Tučný
- Eva Turnová

== U ==
- Jaroslav Uhlíř
- Petr Ulrych

== V ==
- Petr Váša
- Karel Velebný
- Martin Velíšek
- Emil Viklický
- Pavel Vítek
- Josef Vojtek
- Dáša Vokatá
- Helena Vondráčková
- Lucie Vondráčková
- Jan Vyčítal

== W ==
- Miroslav Wanek
- Kateřina Winterová

== X ==
- Xindl X

== Z ==
- Hana Zagorová
- Pavel Zajíček
- Karel Zich

== See also ==
- List of Czech musical groups
