= Ivan Bierhanzl =

- Born: March 3, 1958 (age 67); Prague
- Genres: Rock, experimental, contemporary classical music
- Occupation(s): Musician, record producer
- Instrument(s): Double bass, bass guitar
- Years active: 1970s–present
- Member of: Agon Orchestra
- Formerly of: The Plastic People of the Universe, DG 307

Ivan Bierhanzl (born 3 March 1958) is a Czech musician and record producer.

== Biography ==
Bierhanzl was born in 1958 in Prague. Early in his career, he played with Jaroslav Unger's Doktor Prostěradlo Band.

Bierhanzl started working with The Plastic People of the Universe in the late 1970s, as a guest musician (Pašijové hry velikonoční, recorded 1978) and sound engineer (Co znamená vésti koně, recorded 1981). He also played with DG 307 in the late 1970s and again since the 1990s. In 2001, after Milan Hlavsa's death, he joined The Plastic People of the Universe along with Eva Turnová, the second bass player, initially as a guest musician, later as a full member. He is featured on their reunion album Líně s tebou spím / Lazy Love (2001). In 2005, he played on their collaborative album with Ed Sanders called The Garden Is Open.

He has been a member of the contemporary classical music ensemble Agon Orchestra (originally Agon Ensemble) since the 1980s and also plays with the experimental band DekadentFabrik and the traditional group Malá česká muzika Jiřího Pospíšila. He is also involved in the dramaturgy of several music festivals, including Opera Nova. In 2021, he was the curator of the Electronic Music Minimarathon at the Ostrava Days festival.

He is a signatory of Charter 77.

== Discography ==
With The Plastic People of the Universe

- Pašijové hry velikonoční (1978)
- Co znamená vésti koně (1981; sound engineer only)
- Kolejnice duní (2000; archive live album)
- Líně s tebou spím / Lazy Love (2001)
- Pašijové hry / Passion Play (2004; live album with Agon Orchestra)
- The Garden Is Open (2005)
- Obešel já polí pět (2009; archive live album)

With DG 307

- Dar stínům (1979)
- Pták utrženej ze řetězu (1979)
- Magický město vyhořelo (2008, recorded live 1994)
- Prolínání (2010; live album)
- Životy? Nebo bludné kruhy? (2013)
- Pustina (2017)
- Jak sup letící nad krajinou snu (2021; archive album)

With DekadentFabrik

- Fetish Now! (2011)
- Mental Morphosis (2014)
- Opium Jazz (2016)

With others

- Relaxace and Capella Antiqua E Moderna: Hudba sfér (1989)
- Agon Ensemble: Agon (1991)
- Jan Burian: Černý z nebe (1991)
- Agon Ensemble: Česká nová hudba 60. Let / Czech New Music of the 1960s (1994)
- Agon Orchestra: The Red & Black (1997)
- Martin Smolka and Agon Orchestra: Martin Smolka / Agon Orchestra (1998)
- Filip Topol and Agon Orchestra: Filip Topol & Agon Orchestra (2001)
- Various: Beatnici v Praze / The Beats in Prague (2001)
- Žabí hlen: Žabí hlen (2008; archive album)
- Oldřich Janota: Ora Pro Nobis (2009)
- Ivan Martin Jirous and Agon Orchestra: Magorova summa (2009)
- MCH Trio: 100 minimalistických básní / 100 Minimalistic Poems (2012)
- Malá česká muzika Jiřího Pospíšila: Jak jsi krásné, neviňátko (2013)
- Malá česká muzika Jiřího Pospíšila: Až já tudy povandruju (2017)
