= Líně s tebou spím =

Studio album by The Plastic People of the Universe
- Released: 4 June 2001
- Genre: Rock
- Language: Czech
- Label: Globus Music
- Producer: Tomáš Uher

The Plastic People of the Universe chronology
Půlnoční myš (1987)	Líně s tebou spím (2001)	Maska za maskou (2009)

Líně s tebou spím is a studio album by Czech rock band The Plastic People of the Universe. It was released in June 2001 by Globus Music. It is their first album after death of singer, bassist and main composer Milan Hlavsa; it contains some of his compositions that he wrote before his death. It was produced by Tomáš Uher. The album was received negative critical acclaim. Album booklet contains lyrics in both Czech and English.

== Track listing ==
1. "II. Podzim / The Second Autumn" – 3:26 (music by Ludvík Kandl / lyrics by Bruno Schulz)
2. "Bylo to nedávno / Recently" – 4:10 (music by Milan Hlavsa / lyrics by J. H. Krchovský)
3. "Ach líně, líně… / Oh Lazy, Lazy…" – 4:08 (music by Milan Hlavsa / lyrics by Petr Lampl)
4. "Teď už vím / Now I Know" – 6:15 (music by Milan Hlavsa / lyrics by J. H. Krchovský)
5. "V konečcích prstů / Tips of Fingers" – 4:30 (music by Milan Hlavsa / lyrics by Zbyněk Hejda)
6. "Konec léta / Summer's End" – 5:01 (music by Joe Karafiát / lyrics by Bruno Schulz)
7. "Sen o hadech / Snake Dream" – 5:36 (music by Milan Hlavsa / lyrics by J. H. Krchovský)
8. "Pan K. / Dear Mr. K." – 6:34 (music by Jiří Kabeš / lyrics by Vratislav Brabenec)
9. "Spáč / The Sleeper" – 4:14 (music by Milan Hlavsa / lyrics by J. H. Krchovský)
10. "Moc jsem si neužil / It Wasn't Such a Blast" – 7:01 (music by Milan Hlavsa / lyrics by J. H. Krchovský)

== Personnel ==
- Vratislav Brabenec – saxophone, clarinet, bass clarinet, vocals
- Josef Janíček – keyboards, vocals
- Jiří Kabeš – viola, vocals
- Joe Karafiát – guitar, bass, vocals
- Eva Turnová – bass, vocals
- Ivan Bierhanzl – double bass
- Ludvík Kandl – drums, vocals
- Milan Hlavsa – vocals on "Moc jsem si neužil"
