= Egon Bondy's Happy Hearts Club Banned =

1978 studio album by the Plastic People of the Universe

Studio album by the Plastic People of the Universe
- Released: 1978
- Recorded: 1974–1975
- Genre: Rock
- Length: 52:54
- Label: Globus

The Plastic People of the Universe chronology
Egon Bondy's Happy Hearts Club Banned (1978)	Pašijové hry velikonoční (1978)

Egon Bondy's Happy Hearts Club Banned is an album by Czech underground band the Plastic People of the Universe. It was recorded in 1974/75, mainly at Houska Castle, enabled by the castle's then warden Svatopluk Karásek, with some songs being recorded in Prague. The album could not be officially released and distributed under the former Communist regime in Czechoslovakia; instead fans duplicated tapes with one another, often resulting in poor technical quality. After the band members' arrest and trial in 1976 Ivan Hartl, a Czech living in London, attempted to get the album released in the west. It was released in 1978 in France by SCOPA Invisible Production and in England by Boží Mlýn, a label founded by the former Plastic People member Paul Wilson. In the Czech Republic a remastered version was published in 2001 by Globus Music. The album title is a reference to the Beatles' album Sgt. Pepper's Lonely Hearts Club Band. Ivan Hartl supplied the pun on "banned/band". Most of the songs on the record are settings of poems by Egon Bondy.

== Critical reception ==
Professional ratings
Review scores
Source	Rating
AllMusic	5/5 stars
Spin Alternative Record Guide	9/10

Music critic Robert Christgau named the album one of the few import-only records he loved yet omitted from Christgau's Record Guide: Rock Albums of the Seventies (1981). The Globe and Mail wrote: "They clearly define a heavy bass-drums bottom over which the soloists duel wonderfully with these incredibly sinister riffs. It's a sort of musique noir, evoking images out of Carol Reed's The Third Man, Welles' The Trial and the dark doings and damp streets of Fritz Lang's films noirs of the late 1940s. The album's opening cut, '20', typically sounds like eccentric Procol Harum, though in place of one of Robin Trower's guitar solos Brabanec lays out a devastating sax solo in the manner of Coltrane." The Spin Alternative Record Guide praised the album's "sardonic pleasures."

== Track listing ==
All music composed by Milan Hlavsa; texts are listed.

1. "Dvacet" (lyrics: Egon Bondy)
2. "Zácpa" (lyrics: Egon Bondy)
3. "Toxika" (lyrics: Egon Bondy)
4. "Magické noci" (lyrics: Egon Bondy)
5. "M.G.M." (instrumental)
6. "Okolo okna" (lyrics: Egon Bondy)
7. "Elegie" (lyrics: Egon Bondy)
8. "Podivuhodný mandarin" (lyrics: Egon Bondy)
9. "Nikdo" (lyrics: Egon Bondy)
10. "Jó-to se ti to spí" (lyrics: Egon Bondy)
11. "Já a Mike" (lyrics: Kurt Vonnegut; translated to Czech by Jaroslav Kořán)
12. "Ranní ptáče" (lyrics: Egon Bondy)
13. "Francovka" (lyrics: Egon Bondy)
14. "Jednou nohou" (instrumental)
15. "Spofa blues" (lyrics: Egon Bondy)
16. "Apokalyptickej pták" (lyrics: Pavel Zajíček)
17. "Píseň brance" (lyrics: František Pánek)

== Personnel ==
- Milan Hlavsa – bass guitar, vocals
- Josef Janíček – claviphone, guitar, vibraphone, vocals
- Jiří Kabeš – violin, vocals
- Vratislav Brabenec – alt saxophone
- Jiří Šula – drums
- Jaroslav Vožniak – drums
- Vasil Šnajdr – flute
- Zdeněk Fišer – theremin
