= Mánička =

Czech and Slovak term

Screenshot from an episode of the propagandistic TV series Thirty Cases of Major Zeman, showing "máničky" as a harmful, criminal and drug-using social class

Mánička (in plural: máničky) is a Czech term used for men with long hair, in Czechoslovakia through the 1960s and 1970s. Long hair for males during this time was considered an expression of rebellious political and social attitudes in communist Czechoslovakia. "Mánička" is a female given name, a hypocorism of Máňa, which is a diminutive of variants of the name Maria. It was applied to males in a pejorative manner.

== Background ==
Long hair was associated with the subcultures and youth movements that arose in the Western world during the mid-1960s, such as Hippies and rock music. Following the February coup d'état of 1948, the new communist régime condemned some elements of the Western culture as an inherently decadent imperialist "import" into the socialist world. At first, communists persecuted sympathizers of rock 'n' roll and bebop, and later they focused on supporters of rock music. Their methods were compared with the campaigns of Nazi régime against the supporters of jazz and swing during the Protectorate of Bohemia and Moravia. The term "máničky" is also generally associated with the generation gap that increased around the world during the 1960s.

Male long hair in the Czechoslovak society of the 1960s and 1970s was partially regarded as a matter of image and style, but the main reason for having long hair was usually different. The young people attempted to express openly their political attitude, independence, freedom and protest. However, the revolt symbolized by extravagant appearance was not tolerated by communists and young rebels were often forced to cut their hair. From the mid-1960s, "máničky" became a target of continuous interest of the state security apparatus. The activities of the alternative youth culture were not only and primarily political; therefore it was difficult for communists to grasp their intentions. A large number of young people attempting to live outside of the influence and control of the state was disturbing for the regime, as these people represented a potential danger for the communist system. Through the coordinated pressure of various levels of the state administration, the totalitarian power attempted to force young people to change their appearance, or to displace from the public sphere people who were not "socially acceptable".

== Persecution ==
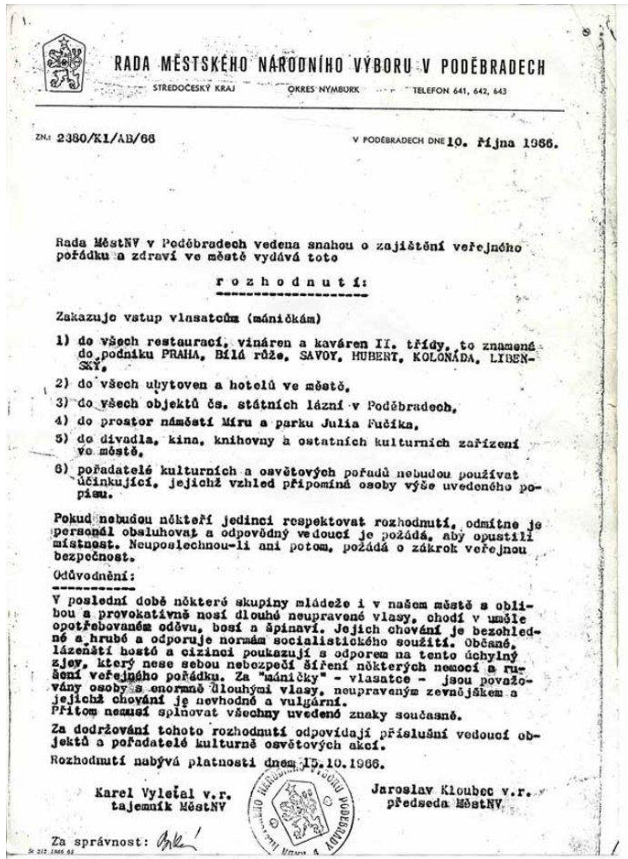
Decision issued by the Municipal National Committee in Poděbrady prohibiting the entry of so-called "Mánička" into most public buildings (dated 10 October 1966).

From the mid-1960s, the long-haired and "untidy" persons (so called "máničky" or "vlasatci" ("hairy dudes")) were banned from entering pubs, cinema halls, theatres and using public transportation in several Czech cities and towns. In 1964, the public transportation regulations in Most and Litvínov excluded long-haired "máničky" as displeasure-evoking persons. Two years later, the municipal council in Poděbrady banned "máničky" from entering cultural institutions in the town. In August 1966, Rudé právo announced that "máničky" in Prague were banned from visiting restaurants of the I. and II. price category.

In 1966, during a big campaign coordinated by the Communist Party of Czechoslovakia, around 4,000 young males were forced to cut their hair, often in prison cells under the supervision of the state police. On 19 August 1966, during a "safety intervention" organized by the state police, 140 long-haired people were arrested. As a response, the "community of long-haired" organized a protest in Prague. More than 100 people cheered slogans such as "Give us back our hair!" or "Away with hairdressers!". The state police arrested the organizers and several participants of the meeting. Some of them were given prison sentences. According to the newspaper Mladá fronta Dnes, the Czechoslovak Ministry of Interior in 1966 even compiled a detailed map of the frequency of occurrence of long-haired males in Czechoslovakia.

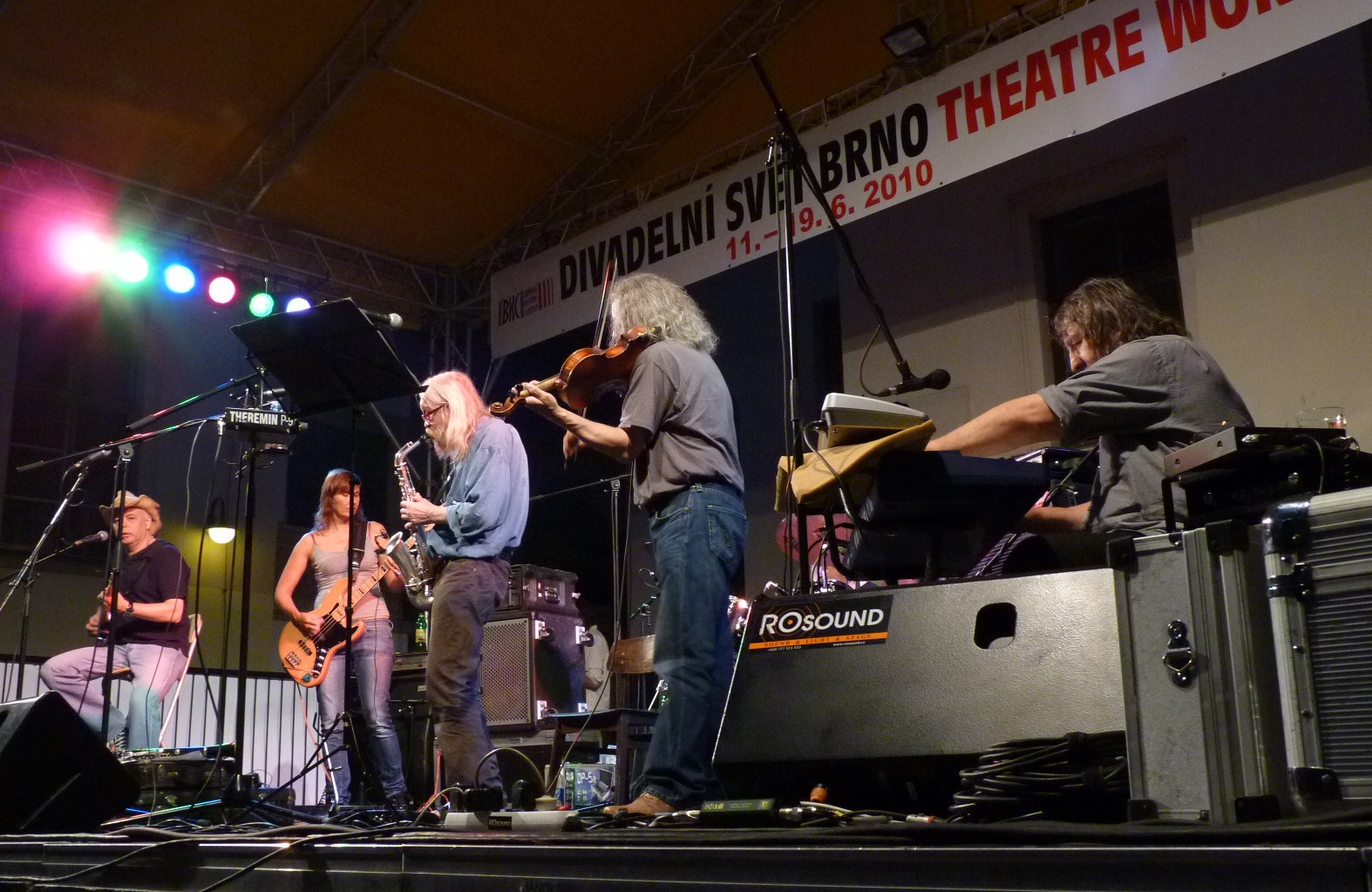
The Plastic People of the Universe, veterans of the Czech cultural underground scene. Their performances were regularly visited by the long-haired "máničky" in the 1960s and 1970s.

In August 1969, during the first anniversary of the Soviet occupation of Czechoslovakia, the long-haired youth were one of the most active voices in the state protesting against the occupation. Youth protesters have been labeled as "vagabonds" and "slackers" by the official normalized press.

The discriminatory campaign against long-haired males called "Máš-li dlouhý vlas, nechoď mezi nás!" (If you have long hair, do not walk among us!) was supported by the state television, and major newspapers and magazines. The campaign consisted of a series of TV spots showing detection and conviction of a long-haired person in a public place. Each spot ended with the trademark slogan: "If you have long hair, do not walk among us!" Similarly, an episode of the popular propagandistic TV series Thirty Cases of Major Zeman showed "máničky" as a harmful, criminal and drug-using social element. Long-haired and intoxicated individuals in the episode called "Mimikry" (Mimicry, 1972) smuggle drugs with suspicious dealers from the Western imperialist world, they cause the death of a girl, and finally they attempt to flee to the West with a hijacked plane.

The performances of the Czech underground bands The Plastic People of the Universe and DG 307 were regularly visited by the long-haired "máničky". In 1974, a concert of The Plastic People of the Universe in České Budějovice was broken up by police. The participants were brought to hearings and trials and forced to cut their hair. Many of them were harassed and some of them were fired from their jobs. In 1976, during a politicized trial with the members of the Plastic People, máničky publicly supported the accused artists.

The repression against long-haired people by the socialist system continued up to 1989, though in a moderate form. The Velvet Revolution and subsequent transformation of the Czechoslovak society into a democratic system caused significant changes, and long hair as a manifestation of defiance gradually lost the previous meaning of a "protest" act.

"Máničky" had the support of numerous personalities in Czechoslovakia: former Czech President Václav Havel, the poet Ivan Martin Jirous, the musician Milan Hlavsa and the politician Alexandr Vondra among others.

== See also ==
- Husák's Children
- Prague underground
- Potápky
- Stilyagi
- Beard and haircut laws by country

== Literature ==
- Pokorná, Terezie; et al. (2010). Háro. Vzpomínky a dokumenty. Prague: Revolver Revue. ISBN 978-80-87037-22-5.
- Pospíšil, Filip; Blažek, Petr (2010). Vraťte nám vlasy!. Academia. ISBN 978-80-200-1873-1.
