= Ivan Martin Jirous =

Czech poet and dissident

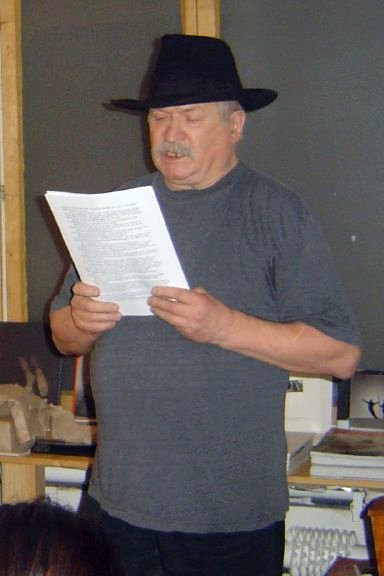
- Ivan Martin Jirous, Ostrava, December 11, 2007
- Born: 23 September 1944; Humpolec, Protectorate of Bohemia and Moravia
- Died: 9 November 2011 (aged 67); Prague, Czech Republic
- Occupation: poet
- Writing career
- Genre: Poetry

Ivan Martin Jirous (23 September 1944 – 9 November 2011) was a Czech poet and dissident, best known as the artistic director of the Czech psychedelic rock group The Plastic People of the Universe, and later one of the key figures of the Czech underground during the communist regime. He is more frequently known as Magor, which can be roughly translated as "shithead", "loony", or "fool" (though meant as a positive title), a nickname given to him by the experimental poet Eugen Brikcius.

Trained as an art historian but unable to work in this field in Czechoslovakia under the Communist regime, Jirous became a member of the dissident subculture, and during the period of normalisation, Jirous was imprisoned five times for his activities. His particular contribution to the dissident movement was the concept of "second culture", according to which simply expressing oneself through forbidden cultural and artistic activities would ultimately undermine the totalitarian system, a concept closely related to his friend Václav Havel's "living in truth", and Václav Benda's "parallel polis".

Jirous won the Jaroslav Seifert Prize in 2006 and the Tom Stoppard Prize in 1985 for the poem Magor's Swan Song (Czech: Magorovy labutí písně).

== Early life ==
Jirous was born in Humpolec in Vysočina. His mother was a teacher, and his father worked in tax. He completed his secondary education at Dr. A Hrdlička's Secondary Comprehensive and Primary School in Humpolec (now known as Dr A Hrdlička's Gymnasium).

Initially, Jirous wanted to study at the Film and TV School of the Academy of Performing Arts in Prague (FAMU), but his cousin Jiří Padrta, editor of the journal Výtvarná práce, steered him towards art history. In 1962, Jirous sat the entrance exam to study history of art at the Philosophy Faculty of Charles University in Prague. A condition of entry for students at the time was the completion of a year in industry before beginning their studies; in Jirous' case, he had to work as a construction worker and stoker. Jirous studied between 1963 and 1968. The topic of his diploma thesis was visual poetry in the works of the poets Jiří Kolář and Henri Michaux. His sister Zara, who was two years older than him and married to the photographer Jan Ságl, also pursued fine art.

== Underground activities ==
In 1967, Jirous became familiar with the underground group The Primitives Group, and later in 1969 became the artistic director and manager of The Plastic People of the Universe (PPU). His wife, Věra Jirousová, wrote a lot of the band's early lyrics. Due to his opposition to his country's totalitarian regime, Jirous was prohibited from publishing his literature. Instead, he had to work as a night watchman and gardener to avoid being unemployed, which was a punishable offence.

Jirous was imprisoned five times for his underground organisation and artistic activities. He was often cautioned under paragraph 202 - "disturbing the peace".

Jirous was first imprisoned between 1973 and 1974 for an incident in a pub with a retired Security Service Major. Jirous was convicted alongside Eugen Brikcius, Daníček and Jaroslav Kořán. After singing the song "Send the Russian killers to hell where they belong" and exchanging words with the Major, Jirous ate the middle of the newspaper Rudé právo and exclaimed "Today I ate Rudé právo, just like one day we will gobble up the Bolsheviks". In June 2011, his conviction was overturned by the Supreme Court.

Jirous's most influential work was Notes on the Third Czech Musical Revival, which he published in exile in 1975. The work was considered a policy statement for the non-political Czech underground and included:

1. Radical rejection of any form of coercion;
2. The renunciation of any imposed artistic programme;
3. Emphasise authenticity in life and artistic creation;
4. Determination against totalitarian structures.

According to Jirous, "the aim of the underground is to create an alternative culture. A culture which will be independent of official communication channels, social evaluation, and the hierarchy of values as imposed by the establishment. A culture which cannot aim to destroy the establishment, for that will only play into the establishment's hands."

Jirous compiled an anthology of underground poetry entitled Egon Bondy to the 45th birthday of the disabled siblings. He also organised several "festivals of independent culture"; the first took place in Postupice in September 1974, forcefully broken up by police, followed by another in Bojanovice in 1976, which also served as a belated celebration of Jirous' marriage to his second wife Juliana. In early 1976 Jirous was introduced to Václav Havel for the first time, via a mutual friend, František Smejkal. The two men became friends and allies, and Jirous is mentioned several times in Havel's Letters to Olga.

On 16 March 1976, Jirous was arrested again, along with the PPU and many other musicians. The whole trial was widely publicised by the regime as a deterrent against troublemakers and hooligans; Czechoslovak Television released a documentary about them called An attack on culture, and an episode of television series Thirty Cases of Major Zeman, entitled Mimicry and starring Jiří Lábus, portrayed the group as drug addicts and terrorists. The trial took place on 21–23 September 1976, and Jirous was convicted for "aggravated hooliganism", along with the musician and pastor Svatopluk Karásek, Pavel Zajíček of the group DG 307, and Vratislav Brabenec from PPU, and imprisoned for a second time, for 18 months. The trial became a cause célèbre, and organised opposition to the charges brought together for the first time the originally apolitical underground groups and political dissidents led by Havel, which eventually led to the creation of Charter 77. On his release from prison in 1977, Jirous signed the Charter, and also organised a third "festival of independent culture", at Václav Havel's country house at Hrádeček in Trutnov District.

Future concerts could only be held as private events since public performances by PPU had been banned. A month after returning home, Jirous was again sentenced to time in prison after he made a speech at a Jiří Lacina exhibition about the insuperable distinction between official and unofficial culture. He served this sentence between 1977 and 1978. In 1979 he helped create the samizdat Vokno, and wrote the unfinished work The True Story of the Plastic People. He also became a member of the Committee for the Defense of the Unjustly Prosecuted (VONS).

Jirous's fourth spell in prison was due to his role in producing, publishing and distributing the magazine Vokno, along with František Stárek, Michal Hýbek, Milan Frič, and Jaroslav Chnápek. The trial took place in May 1982 with strict security and attended by specially selected people, loyal to the regime. The judgement deemed that articles from Vokno were antisocial, with grossly indecent subject matter and a disrespect for society.

Between 1981 and 1985, Jirous was again imprisoned, officially for disturbing the peace, but also, according to Amnesty International and VONS, for unsubstantiated charges of illegal possession of marijuana, allegedly found during a house search. In 1984, Jirous was named Prisoner of the Month by Amnesty International. It was during this time that he wrote the poems later collected as Magor's Swan Song (Czech: Magorovy labutí písně), for which he later won the Tom Stoppard Award. Between 1985 and 1987, Jirous was under supervision as part of his previous convictions, and had to report daily to the Public Security Office.

His fifth imprisonment was in response to his signature on the petition "Tak dost", created in response to the death of the dissident Pavel Wonka. Jirous was imprisoned for "an attack on the state and social organisation" together with Jiri Tichy, and was in prison from 1988 until 25 November 1989, when the President of the Republic waived the rest of his sentence.

== After 1989 ==
After the Velvet Revolution in 1989, Jirous became a member of the Czech PEN club. He and Stanislav Penc wrote to the Interior Ministry in protest against the police intervention at CzechTek 2004. Until his death, Jirous lived in Prague and in a converted farmhouse in Vysočina, where the Magorovo Vydří music festival took place every year from the revolution until 2005. Since 2006 it has been held at Skalákovy mlýn.

Although his friend Jaroslav Eri Fric described him as "a devotee of purity, tenderness and justice", Jirous was vulgar and confrontational, often intentionally, and sometimes physically aggressive when drunk.

Jirous died suddenly on 9 November 2011. His memorial service took place on 17 November 2011 in the Church of Saint Ignatius in Prague, with the service conducted by Bishop Václav Malý. He was buried in a local cemetery to his home in Vysočina.

== Personal life ==
Jirous's first wife was Věra, née Vařilová (1944–2011), a poet and art historian. In 1972 their son was born, Tobiáš, now an actor, writer and DJ. Jirous is named as Tobias's father on his birth certificate, but Tobias's biological father is in fact the philosopher Jiří Němec.

In 1976, Jirous married for a second time, to the painter Juliana, née Stritzková (1943–2023), the granddaughter of Josef Florian. Jirous and Juliána had two daughters, Františka (born 1980) and Marta (born 1981). Jirous spent a large proportion of his daughters' childhoods in prison, but remained in contact with his family. The marriage broke down shortly after his release. His daughter Františka is a novelist, and the chair of the organisation Magor's Estate, which aims to transform Jirous's estate in Vysočina into a monument to poets. Marta continued her father's poetry in the collection Walk with an Angel.

Jirous also had a son, Daniel (born 1992), with translator Daniela Degtěvová. Daniel studies architecture and lives in Prague.

Jirous was in a relationship with the songwriter, Dáša Vokatá, from the 1990s until his death in 2011.

== Works ==
Ivan Martin Jirous first started publishing art criticism during the 1960s. At first, he focused on foreign modern art (Russian avant-garde, Lucio Fontana, Andy Warhol), then later examined the relationship between beat music and art, and later, he specialised in the Křižovnická school of clean humour without the joke (Naděžda Plíšková, Karel Nepraš and Jan Steklík). Jirous was also interested in older art, such as the sculptures of Václav Levý. Jirous contributed to journals including Ateliér, Divadlo ("Theatre"), Host do domu ("Guesthouse"), Sešity pro literaturu a diskusi ("Notebooks for literature and discussion"), Výtvarná práce ("Visual works"), Výtvarné umění ("Fine art"), Výtvarný život ("Visual life"), to the international periodicals Art Canada and Exile Testimony, as well as the samizdat publication Vokno.

=== Features of Magor's poetry ===
- Macaronic language, paraphrasing
- Expression
- Imperfect rhymes
- Assonance
- Acrostic
- Sarcasm and irony
- Vulgarism and Catholic elements
- Self-expression, existential depth
- Search for self and God
- Spirituality
- Addressing specific people, referring to other authors
- "I do not consider myself a poet, rather I know that I love poetry"

=== Poetry collections (Czech titles) ===
- Magorův ranní zpěv, samizdat 1975 - complete collection of his first poems
- Magorova krabička, samizdat 1979
- Mládí nevykouřené, samizdat 1975, 1979 and 1980 - in all three of his first poetry collections, Egon Bondy's influence is evident
- Magorovo borágo, samizdat 1981
- Magorova mystická růže, samizdat 1981
- Magorovy labutí písně, samizdat 1985, London 1989 - This collection arose while Jirous was in prison and was smuggled out to be published. Since he was unable to write while in prison, Jirous instead had to memorise all of his work. The collection includes a number of contemporary cultural and public figures which means it can serve as a "poetic dictionary" of representatives of dissent from that period. This collection received the Tom Stoppard award.
- Ochranný dohled, samizdat 1985 - thematically follows Magorovy labutí písně
- Magorovi ptáci, 1987
- Magorova summa, 1998
- Magorova vanitas, 1999
- Ubíječ labutí, 2001
- Rattus norvegicus, 2004
- Popelnice života, 2004
- Okuje, 2008
- Rok krysy, 2008
- Úloža, 2013
- Magorův noční zpěv, 2013

=== Children's work ===
- Magor dětem, (1982-1986) samizdat 1986 - poems and fairy tales which were written in letters to his daughter from prison.

=== Other books ===
- Magorův zápisník, 1999, a collection of cultural texts and essays written between 1965-1990.
- Magorovy dopisy, 2006, letters written between 1973 and 1985 to his wives Věra and Juliana from various Czech prisons.
- Humpolecký Magor, 2007, a collection of memories from his classmates and teachers from Humpolec, which are combined with some of Jirous's unpublished works.

=== CDs ===
- Agon Orchestra & Ivan M. Jirous - Magorova Summa, 2009, Guerilla records, read by Ivan M. Jirous.
- Ivan Martin Jirous - Pravdivý příběh Plastic People, 2009, read by Ivan M. Jirous, an Oldřich Kaiser.
- Ivan Martin Jirous - Magorovy labutí písně, 2011, Guerilla records, read by Ivan M. Jirous.
- Ivan Martin Jirous - Magorovi ptáci a další příběhy, 2012, Guerilla records, read by Ivan M. Jirous.

== Bibliography ==
- Zantovsky, Michael (2014). Havel: A Life. London: Atlantic Books. ISBN 9780857898524.
