= Prague underground =

Prague underground may refer to:

- Prague underground (culture), an underground culture developed in Prague, Czechoslovakia in the late 1960s and 1970s during the Czechoslovak normalization
- Prague Metro, a subway, underground public transportation network in Prague, Czech Republic
