= Paul Wilson (translator) =

Canadian translator and writer

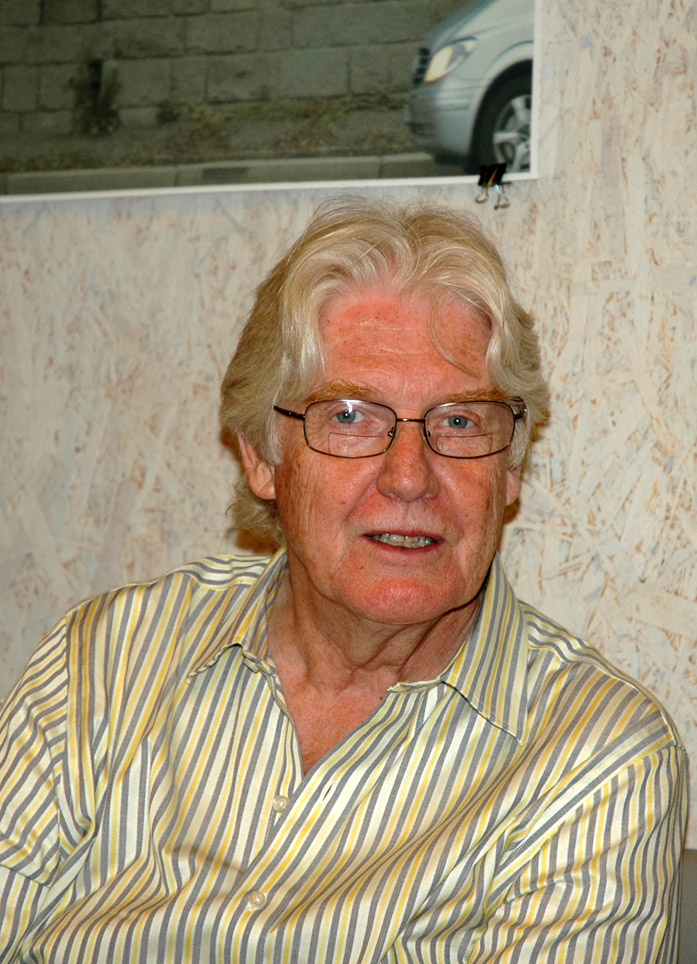
- Paul Wilson (2013)
- Born: Paul Robert Wilson; 3 July 1941 (age 85); Hamilton, Ontario, Canada
- Occupations: Translator; writer

Paul Robert Wilson (born 3 July 1941) is a Canadian translator and writer. From 1967 to 1977 he lived in Czechoslovakia. From 1970 to 1972 he was the lead singer of The Plastic People of the Universe. Because of his association with the Prague underground he was expelled from Czechoslovakia in 1977. He is a major translator from Czech into English, particularly of Václav Havel's work.

== Education ==
Wilson was born in Hamilton, Ontario on 3 July 1941. He studied English literature at Victoria College, a federated college of the University of Toronto, where he wrote his senior thesis on W. B. Yeats. In 1964 he began post-graduate studies in English at King's College London, specializing in "British left-wing literature of the twenties and thirties" with a focus on the work of George Orwell. While living in London Wilson became interested in Czech culture and politics and became acquainted with several Czechs, including his future wife, the photographer Helena Pospíšilová. He gave up his university studies and went to Czechoslovakia in 1967 to teach English.

== Czechoslovakia: 1967–1977 ==
Wilson arrived in Czechoslovakia in the summer of 1967. He taught English full-time at a language school in Brno and part-time in Prague. At the time of the Warsaw Pact invasion of Czechoslovakia which ended the Prague Spring of 1968, he was out of the country on vacation, but returned on 26 August, the day the Moscow Protocol was signed. He moved from Brno to Prague, where he taught English at the university as well as in high school and night school. He got to know members of the Prague underground, including the art critic and poet Ivan Martin Jirous, who was the artistic director of the Plastic People of the Universe. Jirous asked Wilson to teach the band the lyrics of the American songs they covered and translate their original Czech material into English. Wilson was also the band's lead singer from 1970 to 1972.

During the 1970s Wilson translated books from Czech into English for the Artia publishing house, while also translating work of banned Czech authors who could not be published at home. His continued association with the Plastic People of the Universe and other members of the underground led to his expulsion from Czechoslovakia in 1977. After leaving Czechoslovakia Wilson went first to London, where he collaborated with the Czech exile Ivan Hartl to release Egon Bondy's Happy Hearts Club Banned, an album by the Plastic People of the Universe. He created an independent record label, Boží Mlýn, for the purpose and used it to release other Plastic People recordings when he returned to Canada.

== Career in Canada ==
=== Translator ===
Wilson is a leading translator of Czech literature into English. Among the authors whose works he has translated are Václav Havel, Josef Škvorecký, Ivan Klíma, and Bohumil Hrabal. His translation of Škvorecký's The Engineer of Human Souls won the 1984 Governor General's Award for English-language fiction. His translation of Havel's essay The Power of the Powerless was published in 1985 in a collection entitled The Power of the Powerless: Citizens Against the State in Central-Eastern Europe. After translating Havel's Letters to Olga, which was published in English in 1989, Wilson became "something of his official translator".

=== Writer ===
Wilson's many essays and articles have appeared in The New York Review of Books, The New Yorker, Books in Canada and The Idler, among other magazines and newspapers. In 2012 Torst, a Czech publisher, published Bohemian Rhapsodies, consisting of translations into Czech of essays written over a period of thirty years.

=== Editor ===
Wilson was an editor of The Idler, a "Toronto-based bimonthly journal of provocative ideas, politically incorrect opinion and literary style" from 1989 to 1992. He later was a senior editor at Saturday Night magazine and edited the Review section of the National Post. He was a cofounder and senior editor of The Walrus, a Canadian magazine founded in 2003.

== Honours ==
- The Gratias Agit Award (2009)
- The Jiri Theiner Award (2013)
- The Revolver Revue Award (2017) "for everything he has done and still does for Czech culture over the long decades"
