= Kabeš =

Kabeš (feminine: Kabešová) is a Czech surname. Notable people with the surname include:

- Jiří Kabeš (born 1946), Czech musician and songwriter
- Petr Kabeš (1941–2005), Czech poet

== See also ==
- Ian Kabes
