= Pavel Zajíček =

Czech poet and musician (1951–2024)

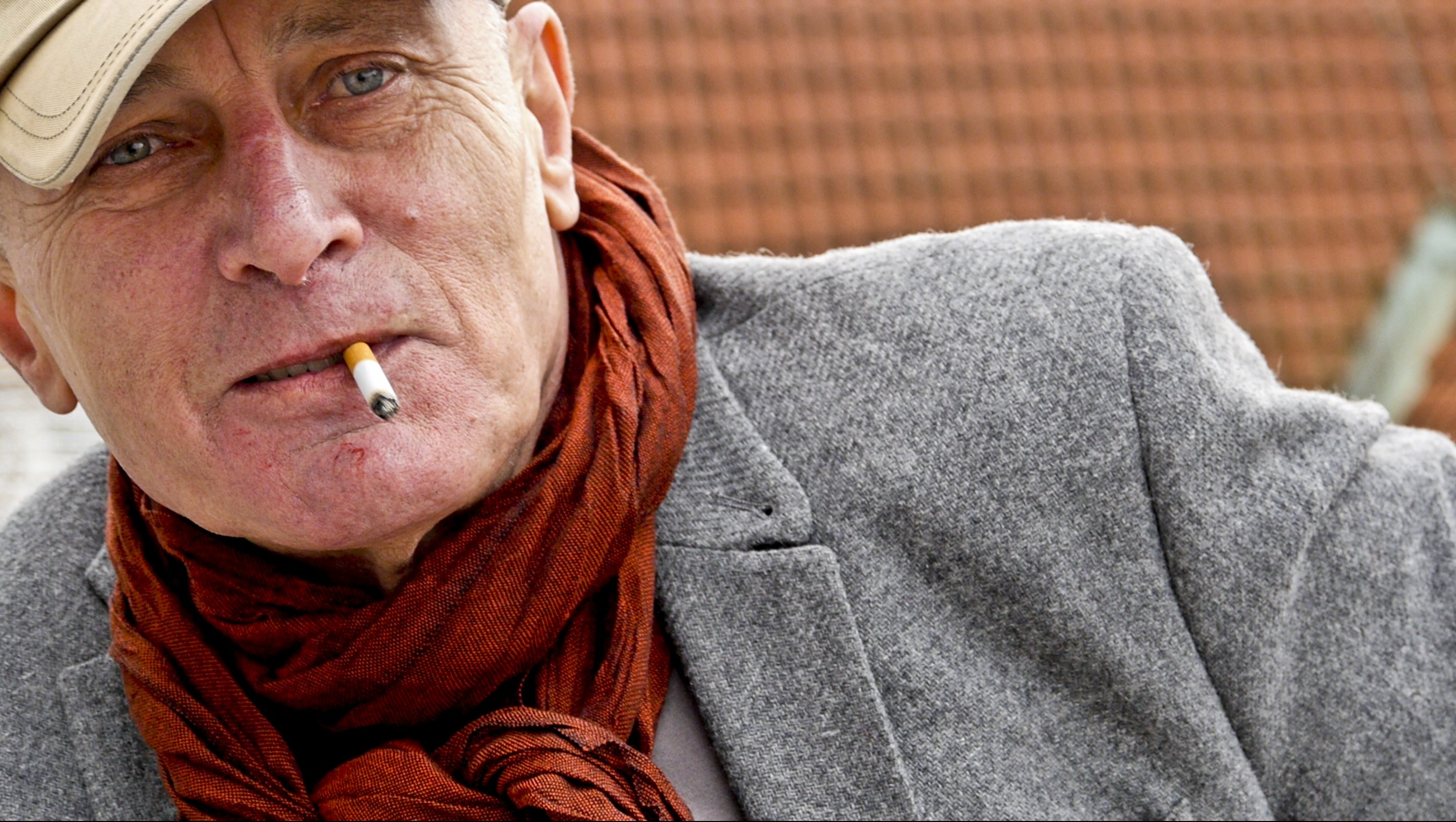

Background information
- Also known as: Pavel Z.
- Born: 15 April 1951; Prague, Czechoslovakia
- Died: 5 March 2024 (aged 72) Prague, Czech Republic
- Genres: Rock
- Occupations: Musician, poet
- Years active: 1973–2016
- Label: Guerilla
- Member of: DG 307

Pavel Zajíček (15 April 1951 – 5 March 2024) was a Czech poet and musician, who was a prominent member of the Czech underground scene during the 1970s, associated with the bands DG 307 and the Plastic People of the Universe.

== Biography ==
In 1973, Zajíček founded the experimental band DG 307 (named after the code for the psychiatric diagnosis that would exempt young men from compulsory military service) together with bassist Milan Hlavsa. The band was persecuted by the communist regime, turning Zajíček (known as "Pavel Z.") into a prominent figure in the Prague underground during the 1970s. In 1980, he emigrated from Czechoslovakia and lived in Sweden, and later in the United States. After the Velvet Revolution he returned to Czechoslovakia, playing with the reformed DG 307.

Zajíček's lyrics were also used in recordings by the Plastic People of the Universe (for example "Apokalyptickej pták" from Egon Bondy's Happy Hearts Club Banned). In 2014 he received the Revolver Revue award. He also starred in the Czech comedy film Buttoners. In 2007 he released a solo album, Kakofonie cesty. His theater piece Pustina (The Waste Land) premiered in 2014, in which he also played a major role.

Zajíček died from pneumonia in Prague on 5 March 2024, at the age of 72.

== Discography ==
- Gift to the shadows (fragment) (1982 Boží mlýn, Canada, LP)
- DG 307 (1973-5) (1990, Globus, CD)
- Dar stínum (autumn 1979) ("Gift to the Shadows" 1992, Globus, CD)
- Pták utrženej ze řetězu (autumn 1979) ("The Bird that Broke Free from its Chain" 1992, Globus, CD)
- Torzo (summer 1980) ("Torso" 1992, Globus, CD)
- Uměle ochuceno (Artificially flavored) (1992, Újezd MC, CD, LP; rerelease 2001, Guerilla Records, CD)
- Koncert: Tvář jako Botticelliho Anděl ("Concert: A Face like Botticelli's Angel" 1995, self-issued, audio cassette only)
- Kniha psaná chaosem ("Book Written in Chaos" 1996, Globus CD)
- Siluety ("Silhouettes" 1998, self-issued CD; rerelease 2001, Guerilla Records, CD)
- Koncert (1999, Indies CD, cassette)
- Pavel Zajíček: Zvuky sirén a zvonů (NÉNIE) ("Sounds of Sirens and Bells" Reading / Evangelical Church of the Savior, 5 June 2001, Prague) (2001, CD)
- Šepoty a výkřiky ("Cries and Whispers" 2002, Guerilla Records, CD)
- Historie hysterie (Archiv dochovaných nahrávek 1973-75 "A History of Hysteria: Archival Recordings 1973-75") 2CD:
  - CD 1 – (71:10 mins) 7 October 1973, Klukovice, 2 June 1974, ateliér Kadlec, Prague-Žižkov, 1 September 1974, Postupice, '31 January 1975, Mokropsy
  - CD 2 – (44:56 mins) November 1975, Houska Castle + photos: Postupice (5:51 mins), Kostelec u Křížku (9:51 mins), (2004, Guerilla Records)
- Nosferatu (Symfonie hrůzy na motívy filmu F. W. Murnau) ("Nosferatu: A Symphony of Horror, new soundtrack to F.W. Murnau's film" 2004, Guerilla Records CD)
- DG 307 – LIVE (17 April 2005) (2005, Guerilla Records CD)
- Pavel Zajíček: Kakofonie cesty ("Cacophonies of the Road" 2007, Guerilla records, CD)
- Květy podzimu – barvy jara /live at La Fabrika ("Autumn Flowers – Spring Colors" 2008, La Fabrika, CD)
- Magický město vyhořelo! (koncert v klubu Jilská 15/10/1994) ("Magic City Burnt Down! Concert in Jilská Club 15 November 1994" 2008, Guerilla Records, CD)
- Veřejná zkouška 07032009/Public rehearsal Praha – New York (2009, Ears&Wind Records, CD-R in a tin)
- Prolínání ("Penetration": P.Z. + Monika Načeva, live fragment, DG 307, 21 April 2010, Retro Music Hall, Prague) (2010, dinn (dinn is not noise), LP)
- V katedrálách ticha (koncert z roku 1994) ("In Cathedrals of Silence: concert from 1994" 2011, Guerilla Records, CD)
- Pavel Zajíček: Podobenství ("A Parable" 2011, Guerilla Records, CD)
- Životy? Nebo bludné kruhy? ("Lives? Or Vicious Circles?" 2013, Guerilla Records, CD)
- Svědek spálenýho času (Witness to Burnt Time) (1979–80) 5CD:
  - CD 1 – Dar stínum (Gift to the Shadows) – studio (15 songs, running time 79:28)
  - CD 2 – Dar stínum (Gift to the Shadows) – live (16 songs, running time 79:54)
  - CD 3 – Pták utrženej ze řetězu (The Bird that Broke Free from its Chain) – studio (17 songs, running time 79:01)
  - CD 4 – Pták utrženej ze řetězu (The Bird that Broke Free from its Chain) – live (21 songs, running time 78:31)
  - CD 5 – Torzo (Torso) (16 songs, running time 43:35, 3 bonus tracks)
  - Book – Svědek spálenýho času (Witness to Burnt Time) (104 pages, 40 photos – text P. Ferenc, photos A. Libánský, J. Hric, J. Kukal, O. Němec, P. Prokeš, 2013, Guerilla Records)
- Svobodná místa ("Free Places" 2019, concert from 2011, Guerilla Records, CD)*Kakofonie cesty (2007)
- Podobenství ("A Parable" 2011)

== Books ==
- DG 307 (1973–1975) (collection of song lyrics for concert performances)
- Mařenická kniha ("Maria's Book" 1977, samizdat)
- Dopisy (Tok okamžiků) ("Letters. The Flow of Moments" 1977, samizdat)
- Vyslov sám sebe i svůj svět ("Expression of Onself and One's World" 1977, samizdat)
- Dar stínum (1979) ("Gift to the Shadows" collection of song lyrics for concert performances)
- Pták utrženej ze řetězu zdivočel a uletěl… ozvěny jeho falešnejch zpěvů (Kundy rty ústa tváře masky) ("A Bird Freed from its Chain Went Wild and Flew Off... echoes of its feigned songs. C*nts lips mouths faces masks" 1979, collection of song lyrics for concert performances)
- Torzo ("Torso" 1980) (collection of song lyrics for concert performances)
- Úlomky skal ("Chips from Cliffs" 1979, samizdat)
- Šedej sen ("Grey Dream" 1980, samizdat)
- Listy k čemukoliv ("Letters to Anyone" 1980, samizdat)
- Roztrhanej film ("Torn Film" 1980, samizdat)
- Kniha moří ("Book of Seas" 1980, manuscript)
- DG307 Texty z let 1973-79 (DG307 Texts 1973-79" 1990, Vokno)
- Kniha měst ("Book of Cities" 1993, Vokno)
- Čas je výkřik uprostřed noci ("Time is a Scream in the Middle of the Night" 2000, Maťa)
- Zvuky sirén a zvonů (NÉNIE) ("Sounds of Sirens and Bells" 2001, Vetus Via)
- Zápisky z podzemí (1973-1980) ("Notes from Underground 1973-1980" 2002, Torst; contains: Mařenická kniha, Dopisy (Tok okamžiků), Vyslov sám sebe i svůj svět, Úlomky skal, Roztrhanej film, Šedej sen, Listy k čemukoliv)
- Jakoby… Svět v zrnku písku… ("As if... The World in a Grain of Sand" 2003, Torst)
- Cesta vlakem z P. do B. Pollockovy fleky odposlouchaná slova ("Train Trip from P. to B. / Pollock's Splotches / Words Overheard" 2007, Vetus Via)
- Roztrhanej film ("Torn Film" 2008, Pulchra)
- Kniha psaná chaosem ("Book Written in Chaos" 2009, Pulchra)
- Pohádka se špatným koncem ("Fairy Tale with an Unhappy Ending" 2010, Vetus Via)
- Všechno je úplně jinak… ("Everything is Completely Different" 2010, Pulchra)
- Kniha moří ("Book of Seas" 2011, Pulchra)
- Chvění ("Trembling" 2012, Maťa)

== In English translation ==
- Time is a mid-night scream. Fragments from the 1990s (Twisted Spoon, 2005) tr. Marek Tomin
- Prchavé domy. Mezi vyhanstvím a vnitřím exilem / Fleeting Homes. Between Banishment and Inner Exile (Palacký University Press, 2010) Anthology, including four poems by P.Z. tr. Matthew Sweney
