= Blue booklet =

Czechoslovak certificate of exemption from military service

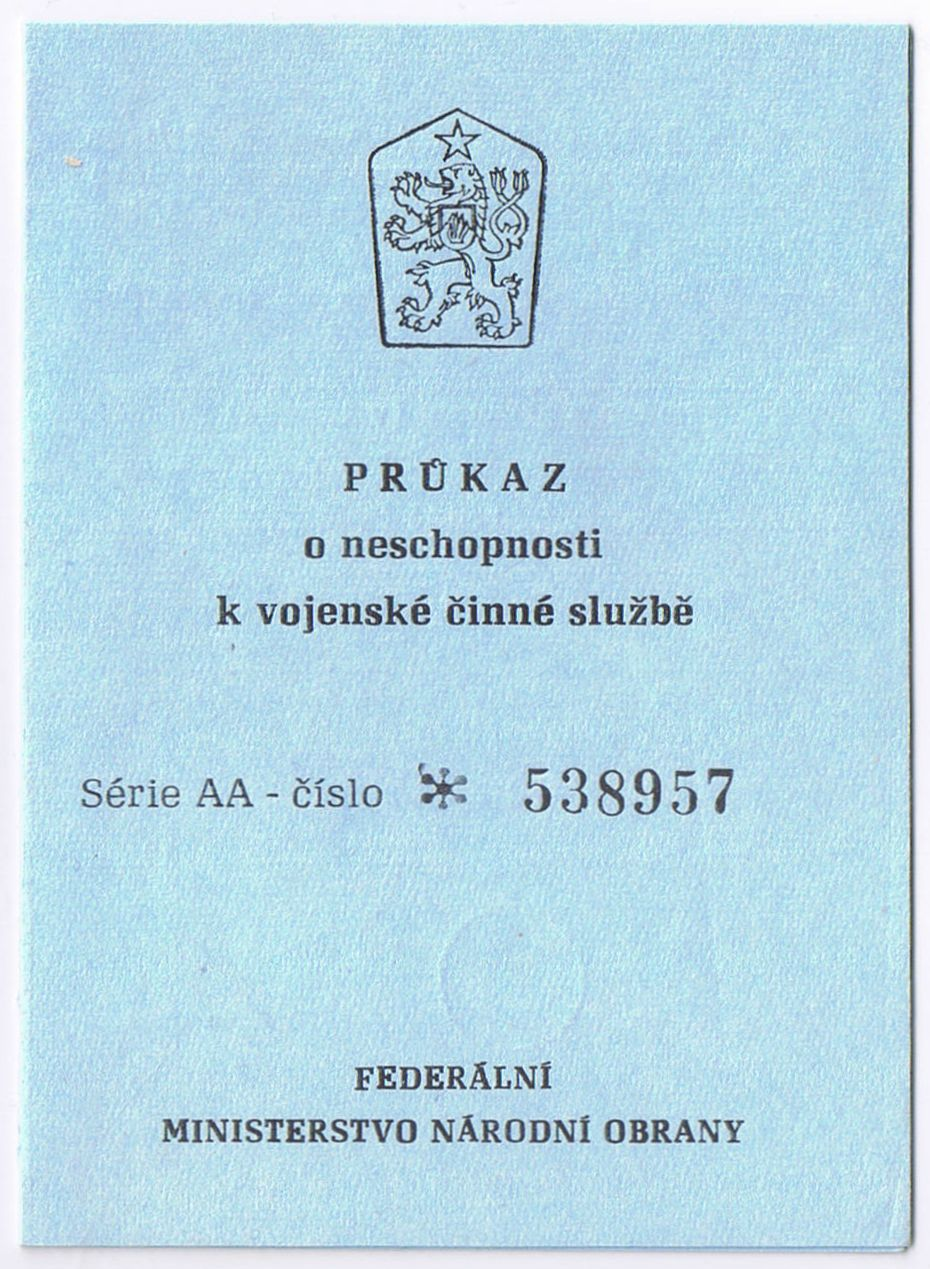
Czechoslovak blue booklet cover from 1992

The Blue booklet (Czech: Modrá knížka, officially Průkaz o neschopnosti k vojenské činné službě (Document of proof of incapacity for military service) or formerly Průkaz o osvobození od vojenské povinnosti (Document of proof of exemption from military service) was a certificate of exemption from military service in Czechoslovakia and later in the Czech Republic and Slovakia. Compulsory military service had existed throughout the unified nation's history and was only abolished in 2004 in the Czech Republic and one year later in Slovakia. The holder of a blue booklet could not be drafted for basic military service nor included in the reserve.

== Application process ==
Applications for a blue booklet had to be reviewed by the military administration's conscription board, usually on the basis of opinions from specialists. The usual procedure was that the applicant filled in a detailed questionnaire about his health condition and had it confirmed by his family doctor, who sent him for the relevant examinations according to the content of the questionnaire and the applicant's medical history. The applicant then submitted all pertinent documents to the conscription board for approval.

== Reasons for exemption ==
Some common reasons for a person of eligible age to be exempted from military service included missing a limb, paralysis or immobility, lack of eyesight, deafness, and mental illness. In practice, allergies, asthma, spinal conditions, eye defects, or high blood pressure were the most common reasons for conscripts to receive blue booklets around the year 2000.

In addition, people opposed to the armed services or combat, known as conscientious objectors, also tried to obtain blue booklets.

== Cultural references ==
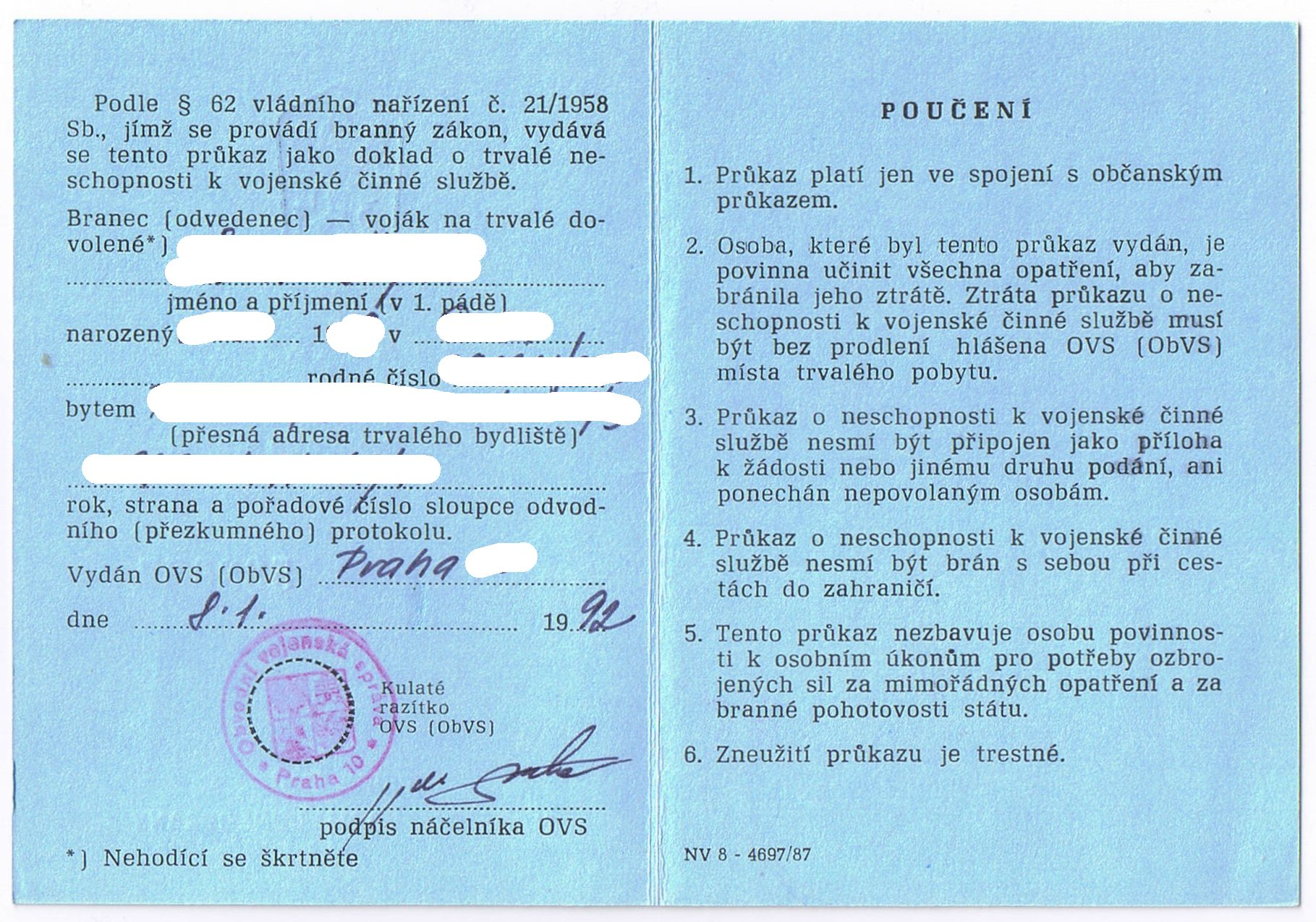
Inside of Czechoslovak blue booklet

References to blue booklets can be found in various artistic media, including music, literature, and film. Karel Plíhal recorded a song titled "Modrá knížka" on his 1992 album, Takhle nějak to bylo..., dealing with the despair of a young man who has obtained the coveted document. The Czech underground rock band DG 307 was named after a psychiatric diagnosis that allowed young men to get a blue booklet, and the rock group Blue Effect's name is also inspired by the document, as most of its members were in possession of one. The 2010 comedy film Identity Card also references the booklet.
