= Thirty Cases of Major Zeman =

Czechoslovak action-drama television series

- Vladimír Brabec as Major Jan Zeman
- Czech: Třicet případů majora Zemana
- Created by: Jiří Sequens
- Starring: Vladimír Brabec; Rudolf Jelínek; Miloš Willig; František Němec; Ladislav Mrkvička; Vladimír Ráž; Josef Větrovec; Radoslav Brzobohatý; Ivana Andrlová
- Country of origin: Czechoslovak Socialist Republic
- Original languages: Czech; Slovak
- No. of episodes: 30 (list of episodes)

Production
- Running time: 45-90 min

Original release
- Network: Czechoslovak Television
- Release: 1975 – 1980

Thirty Cases of Major Zeman (Třicet případů majora Zemana) is a Czechoslovak action-drama television show intended as a political propaganda to support the official image and attitude of the Communist Party of Czechoslovakia. The series was filmed in the 1970s. Most of the episodes are inspired by real criminal cases. The series follows the life of police investigator Jan Zeman during his career from 1945 to 1973.

== Cast ==
- Vladimír Brabec as major Jan Zeman / Richard Lipinski
- Miloš Willig as colonel Václav Kalina
- Josef Větrovec as colonel Pavlásek, chief of criminal police
- Vladimír Ráž as medical examiner Veselý
- Rudolf Jelínek as major Jiří Hradec
- František Němec as major Žitný of StB
- Ladislav Mrkvička as first lieutenant Stejskal
- Emil Horváth as lieutenant Gajdoš
- Renáta Doleželová as Zeman's first wife Lída
- Jaroslava Obermaierová as Zeman's second wife Blanka
- Ivana Andrlová as Zeman's daughter Lída
- Radoslav Brzobohatý as Pavel Bláha, SNB first lieutenant turned western agent

== Plot of the first episode ==
The first episode takes place in 1945. Young Jan Zeman is returning from a Nazi concentration camp. On the train he meets his friend Václav Kalina, who tells him about his plan to join the police force once he gets home. Jan returns to his home village and finds only his mother there. He discovers that his father has been murdered. The police are unable to find the murderer and close the case. Jan begins investigating on his own, wishing to expose his father's killer. He reveals a conspiracy and informs Václav Kalina at Brno police headquarters; eventually, the murderers are captured. Impressed, Kalina induces Jan to join the police and serve with him.

== List of episodes ==
| Episode | Date | Title | Aired |
|---|---|---|---|
| 1 | 1945 | Smrt u jezera (Death at the Lake) - the first episode, following the young Jan Zeman who has just returned home from a concentration camp only to find his father dead. | 1974 |
| 2 | 1946 | Vyznavači ohně (Fire Worshippers) | 1974 |
| 3 | 1947 | Loupež sladkého I (The Theft of the Sweet I) - About profiteering on deficiency of Insulin. | 1974 |
| 4 | 1947 | Rubínové kříže (Ruby Crosses) - inspired by Ukrainian Insurgent Army activities on Czechoslovak territory. | 1975 |
| 5 | 1948 | Hon na lišku (Fox Hunt) - episode about Victorious February | 1975 |
| 6 | 1949 | Bestie (The Beast) - about illegal crossing of the Czech–West German border, inspired by Hubert Pilčík | 1975 |
| 7 | 1950 | Mědirytina (The Copperplate) - about the counterfeiting of ration stamps, used in CSR until 1953. | 1975 |
| 8 | 1951 | Strach (Fear) - inspired by Mašín's sons | 1975 |
| 9 | 1952 | Loď do Hamburku (The Riverboat to Hamburg) - one of the episodes about the spy Pavel Bláha, a former Sbor národní bezpečnosti agent who defects to the West. | 1975 |
| 10 | 1953 | Vrah se skrývá v poli (The Murderer Hides in the Field) | 1975 |
| 11 | 1954 | Křížová cesta (Way of the Cross) - one of the episodes about agent Bláha. | 1976 |
| 12 | 1955 | Kleště (The Tongs) - one of the episodes about Bláha. | 1976 |
| 13 | 1956 | Romance o nenápadné paní (Romance of an Inconspicuous Lady) | 1976 |
| 14 | 1957 | Konec velké šance (The End of the Great Chance) - one of the episodes about agent Pavel Bláha. | 1976 |
| 15 | 1958 | Kvadratura ženy (Quadrature of a Woman) - about a dissected female body found in the Vltava river. | 1976 |
| 16 | 1959 | Dáma s erbem (The Lady with a Coat of Arms) | 1976 |
| 17 | 1960 | Prokleté dědictví (The Cursed Heritage) | 1976 |
| 18 | 1961 | Bílé linky (The White Lines) | 1976 |
| 19 | 1962 | Třetí housle (The Third Violin) | 1976 |
| 20 | 1963 | Modrá světla (Blue Lights) | 1976 |
| 21 | 1964 | Pán ze Salcburku (A Gentleman from Salzburg) | 1978 |
| 22 | 1965 | Tatranské pastorále (High Tatra Pastorale) - based on the real-life murder of Milada Drexler in the High Tatras. | 1978 |
| 23 | 1966 | Šťastný a veselý (Happy New Year) | 1978 |
| 24 | 1967 | Klauni (Clowns) | 1978 |
| 25 | 1968 | Štvanice (The Hunt) - episode about the end of political steps to freedom. | 1978 |
| 26 | 1969 | Studna (The Well) - horror episode about apocalyptic deaths in a country house. | 1978 |
| 27 | 1970 | Rukojmí v Bella Vista (The Bella Vista Hostage)- episode about sabotage against a Czechoslovak shipment for Allende's Chile. | 1978 |
| 28 | 1971 | Poselství z neznámé země (The Message from an Unknown Land) - continuation of "The Bella Vista Hostage" | 1978 |
| 29 | 1972 | Mimikry (Mimicry) - episode about a plane hijack, with allusion to the rock band Plastic People and young long-haired fans of rock music called máničky. | 1978 |
| 30 | 1973 | Růže pro Zemana (The Rose for Zeman) - the final episode. | 1979 |

Screenshot of the episode "Mimikry (Mimicry)", showing máničky as a harmful, criminal and drug-using social class.

== Controversy ==
A re-broadcast of the series in the Czech Republic in 1999, caused controversy and public criticism of the series, which was accused of conveying communist propaganda and portraying those with different political views as criminals.

== See also ==
- Comrade Detective, a show that parodies propaganda series like Major Zeman
