= Dáša Vokatá =

Czech singer-songwriter (born 1954)

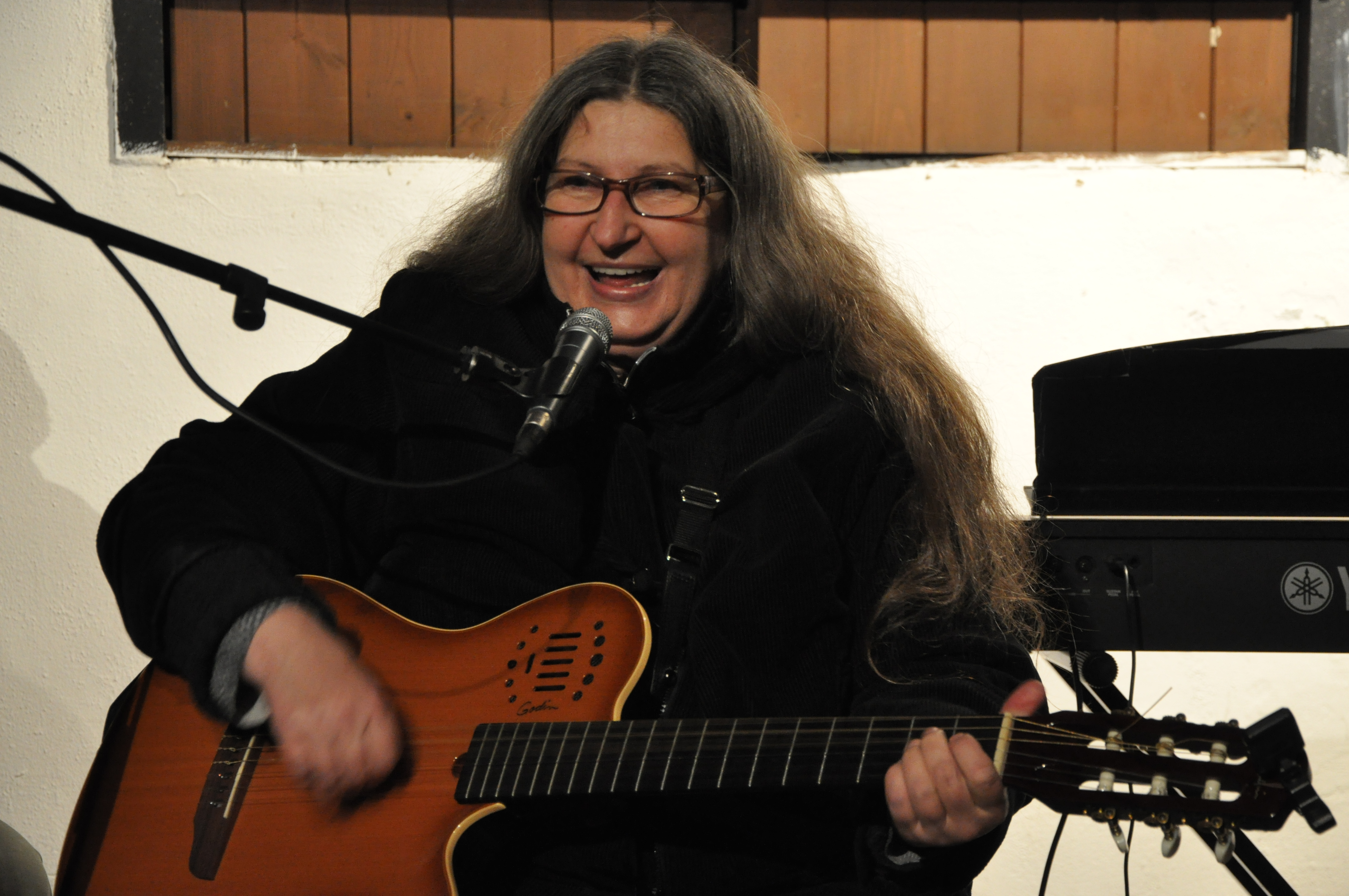
- Dáša Vokatá (2013)

Background information
- Born: 27 January 1954 (age 72); Karviná, Czechoslovakia
- Genres: Folk rock
- Occupation: Singer-songwriter
- Instrument: Guitar
- Label: Guerilla
- Website: dasavokata.com

Dáša Vokatá (born 27 January 1954 in Karviná) is a Czech singer-songwriter. She signed Charter 77 and after she emigrated to Austria. Her debut album called Láska was released in 1985. After the Velvet Revolution, she returned to Czechoslovakia, where she released four more albums. Her most recent studio album Dva divoký koně was released in 2014. For twenty years she lived with poet Ivan Martin Jirous.

== Discography ==
- Láska (1985)
- Dáša Vokatá (2000)
- Bojovníci snů (2008)
- Najdi místo pro radost (2011)
- Dva divoký koně (2014)
