= The Plastic People of the Universe =

Czech rock band

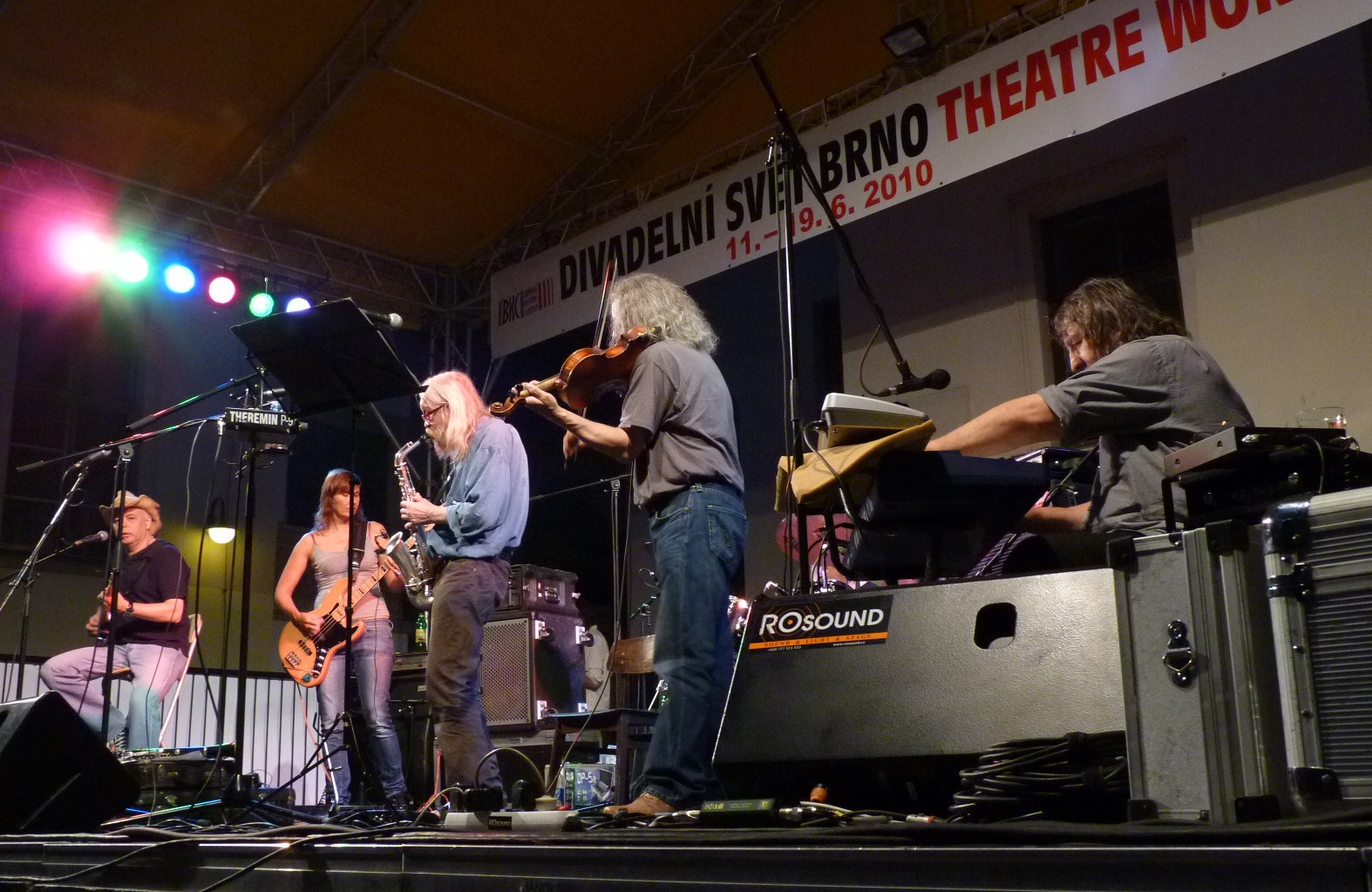
- The Plastic People of the Universe performing in 2010

Background information
- Also known as: PPU; The Plastics; Plastici; Plastic People
- Origin: Prague, Czechoslovakia
- Genres: Rock; experimental rock; Prague underground
- Years active: 1968–1988, 1997–present
- Labels: Globus Music; Guerilla Records; Boží Mlýn Productions; Levné knihy; Indies
- Spinoffs: Půlnoc
- Members: The Plastic People of the Universe: Josef Janíček; Vratislav Brabenec; Jaroslav Kvasnička; Johnny Judl Jr; David Babka; The Plastic People of the Universe/New Generation: Jiří Kabeš; Josef Karafiát; Jakub Koláček; Wenca Březina; Vojtěch Starý
- Past members: See Past members
- Website: plastic-people.cz plasticpeople.cz

The Plastic People of the Universe (PPU) is a Czech rock band from Prague. They are considered the foremost representatives of Prague's underground culture (1968–1989), which defied Czechoslovakia's Communist regime. Members of the band often suffered serious repercussions, including arrests and prosecution, because of their non-conformist ideals. The group continues to perform, despite the death in 2001 of its founder, main composer, and bassist, Milan Hlavsa. Up to 2023, they had released nine studio albums and over a dozen live albums.

In 2016, the group split in two because of internal differences. The original group is composed of bandleader Josef Janíček, Vratislav Brabenec, Jaroslav Kvasnička, Johnny Judl Jr, and David Babka. The second splinter group, which performs under the name The Plastic People of the Universe/New Generation, is composed of Jiří Kabeš, Josef Karafiát, Jakub Koláček, Wenca Březina, and Vojtěch Starý.

== History ==
=== Formation and early years: 1968–1974 ===
From January to August 1968, under the rule of Communist Party leader Alexander Dubček, Czechoslovaks experienced the Prague Spring. In August, Soviet and other Warsaw Pact troops invaded the country, leading to the overthrow of Dubček's government and the period that came to be known as Normalization. Less than a month after the invasion, bassist Milan Hlavsa, who was seventeen years old at the time, formed the Plastic People of the Universe. The rest of the band was composed of Michal Jernek (vocals, clarinet), Jiří "Přemysl" Števich (guitar), and Josef Brabec (drums). A few months later, Pavel Zeman replaced Brabec, and guitarist and keyboardist Josef Janíček joined the band.

The group was heavily influenced by Frank Zappa and the Velvet Underground (Zappa's band, the Mothers of Invention, featured the song "Plastic People" on their 1967 album Absolutely Free and inspired the Czech group's name). Czech art historian and cultural critic Ivan Jirous became the band's manager/artistic director in the following year, fulfilling a role similar to Andy Warhol's with the Velvet Underground. The band's membership shifted at this point, and Jirous introduced Hlavsa to guitarist Josef Janíček and viola player Jiří Kabeš, who, together with saxophone player Vratislav Brabenec, formed the core of the group, with a rotating cast of drummers that included Jiří Šula, Jaroslav Vožniak, Jan Schneider, and Jan Brabec. The consolidated Czech communist government revoked the band's musical license in 1970.

Because Jirous believed that English was the lingua franca of rock music, he asked Paul Wilson, a Canadian who was teaching English in Prague, to teach the band the lyrics of the American songs they covered and translate their original Czech material into English. Wilson was the band's lead singer from 1970 to 1972. During this time, the group's repertoire drew heavily on songs by the Velvet Underground and the Fugs. The only two songs sung in Czech in this period were "Na sosnové větvi" and "Růže a mrtví", both of whose lyrics were written by Czech poet Jiří Kolář. Because the band was not permitted to record their music, fans circulated bootleg copies of concert material, remastered versions of which were released many years later, under the titles Muž bez uší (2002), Vožralej jak slíva (1997), Do lesíčka na čekanou (2006), Trouble every day (2002), and Ach to státu hanobení (2000).

After Wilson left, PPU drew from the poet Egon Bondy, whose work had been banned by the government. In the following three years, Bondy's lyrics almost completely dominated PPU's music. In December 1974, the band recorded their first studio album, Egon Bondy's Happy Hearts Club Banned (the title being a play on the Beatles' Sgt. Pepper's Lonely Hearts Club Band), which was released in France in 1978.

=== Persecution, trial, and aftermath: 1974–1988 ===
In 1974, thousands of people traveled from Prague to České Budějovice to see the Plastics perform. Stopped by police, they were sent back to Prague, and several students were arrested. The band was forced underground until the Velvet Revolution, in 1989. Unable to perform openly, an entire underground cultural movement formed around them during the 1970s. Sympathizers of the movement were often called máničky, a term referring to men with long hair during that era.

In 1976, the Plastics and other people from the underground scene were arrested and put on trial (after performing at the Druhý festival druhé kultury event) by the Communist government, in order to set an example. They were convicted of "organized disturbance of the peace" and sentenced to prison terms ranging from eight to eighteen months. Paul Wilson was deported, despite having left the band in 1972. Other artists who also suffered arrest and persecution following this event included Pavel Zajíček, Svatopluk Karásek, and František Stárek. After being released from prison, the Plastics continued to make music. In response to their persecution, they recorded a number of compositions, which were compiled on the album Kolejnice dúni, released in 2000.

Although the PPU were not associated with politics, the Communist regime's accusations against them led to various protests. It was partly in response to the arrests and prosecutions that playwright Václav Havel and others wrote Charter 77. The trial of the Plastics became a milestone for opposition against the Communist regime in Czechoslovakia.

In 1978, PPU recorded the Easter-themed album Pašijové hry velikonoční (released in Canada as The Passion Play by Paul Wilson's imprint, Boží Mlýn Productions). Jak bude po smrti, which set the poetry of Ladislav Klíma to music, followed in 1979, and Co znamená vésti koně in 1980. In 1982, Brabenec was forced by the secret police to leave the country as part of Akce Asanace ("sanitation act"), and emigrated to Canada. After his departure, the band released the albums Hovězí porážka in 1983 and Půlnoční myš in 1986. At the time, PPU included clarinetist Petr Placák, cellist Tomáš Schilla, guitarist Milan Schelinger (brother of Jiří Schelinger), and vocalist Michaela Pohanková.

Despite their clashes with the government, the musicians never considered themselves activists and always claimed that they wanted only to play their music. In the spring of 1987, two legal concerts were arranged, but both were eventually canceled by the organizers, under pressure from police. This led to disputes between the band members and eventually, the group broke up. Hlavsa, Janíček, and Kabeš formed the group Půlnoc, which played publicly from 1988 and was even allowed to tour the United States a year later. Půlnoc recorded two albums in the early 1990s.

=== Reunion, Hlavsa's death, and continuation: 1997–2014 ===
After the Velvet Revolution, in 1989, the only concert PPU held was in 1992, with the old lineup of Hlavsa, Janíček, Števich, Jernek, and Zeman. This was recorded, and released as Bez ohňů je underground in 1993. In 1997, Hlavsa, in collaboration with Jan Vozáry (Oceán), released the live album Magické noci 1997, which included older Plastic People songs in a modern electronic arrangement. The album wasn't released until 2021. Also in 1997, upon President Havel's suggestion, PPU reunited in honor of the twentieth anniversary of Charter 77. Their lineup consisted of Hlavsa, Brabenec, Janíček, Kabeš, Brabec, as well as Joe Karafiát. They released the live album The Plastic People of the Universe the same year and continued to tour.

In 1999, along with Lou Reed, PPU performed at the White House during Václav Havel's state visit.

Milan Hlavsa died of lung cancer in 2001. Afterward, the Plastics were unsure whether or not to continue without their frontman and main songwriter, but after long discussions, they decided to honor his memory by keeping the band going. That year, they published a collection of Hlavsa's unreleased compositions, under the title Líně s tebou spím / Lazy Love – In Memoriam Mejla Hlavsa.

Eva Turnová, from DG 307, became the band's new bass player. Ludvík Kandl (Hudba Praha) sat in on drums (he was replaced by Jaroslav Kvasnička in 2009) and in the years 2001–2009, double bassist Ivan Bierhanzl, who had briefly performed with the band in the 1970s, was a member of PPU.

In 2003, the Supreme Court of the Czech Republic overturned the 1976 verdicts against members of PPU. Subsequently, in collaboration with Agon Orchestra, the band re-recorded two of their older concept albums: 1979's Jak bude po smrti (recorded in 2003 and released in 2010 as Obešel já polí pět) and 1978's Pašijové hry velikonoční (recorded and released in 2004).

Interest in the band was rekindled in 2006, thanks to the play Rock 'n' Roll, by Tom Stoppard, which featured two of their songs and had several characters discuss the band's music and its effects on Czech society. Stoppard consulted with former PPU member Paul Wilson while writing the play, which Wilson described as "an amazing feat of imagination".

In December 2009, PPU released their first studio album since 2001 as well as their first without Hlavsa, titled Maska za maskou.

In 2014, the Plastic People of the Universe teamed up with the Brno Philharmonic for a symphonic performance of their 1981 album, Co znamená vésti koně.

=== Disputes and division: 2015–present ===
Disputes soon arose between PPU members, and a distinctive rift occurred. Kvasnička and Turnová left. On 17 November 2015, the band performed again with the Brno Philharmonic, and a recording of the concert was published in 2017. Since the concert had been rehearsed together with the two recently departed members, Kvasnička and Turnová were forced to perform, a decision Kabeš disagreed with, and which subsequently led to his departure. Karafiát followed suit shortly after. After the concert, Brabenec also announced his departure and in January 2016, Janíček walked out.

Kabeš and Karafiát then added bassist Tomáš Skřivánek, drummer Jan Ježek, and keyboardist Vojtěch Starý to the band's lineup and decided to continue under the name The Plastic People of the Universe/New Generation, later returning to the original name. The departed members of the band (Brabenec, Janíček, Kvasnička), on the other hand, continued as a separate unit, though also using the original PPU name. They embarked on a tour with Co znamená vésti koně material, performing in the Ukrainian city of Kharkiv on 18 October 2016, as part of the commemoration of Václav Havel's eightieth birthday. Both lineups, with bassist Johnny Judl Jr and guitarist David Babka joining Brabenec's group, subsequently performed under the same name, and arguments arose as to who the "real" Plastics were.

In 2018, PPU celebrated its fiftieth anniversary. The highlight of the celebrations was a sold-out concert by Brabenec's group at Prague's Acropolis Palace. Several previous members of the group participated, including Josef Rössler, Vladimír Dědek, Tomáš Schilla, Jan Brabec, and Petr Placák.

== Band members ==
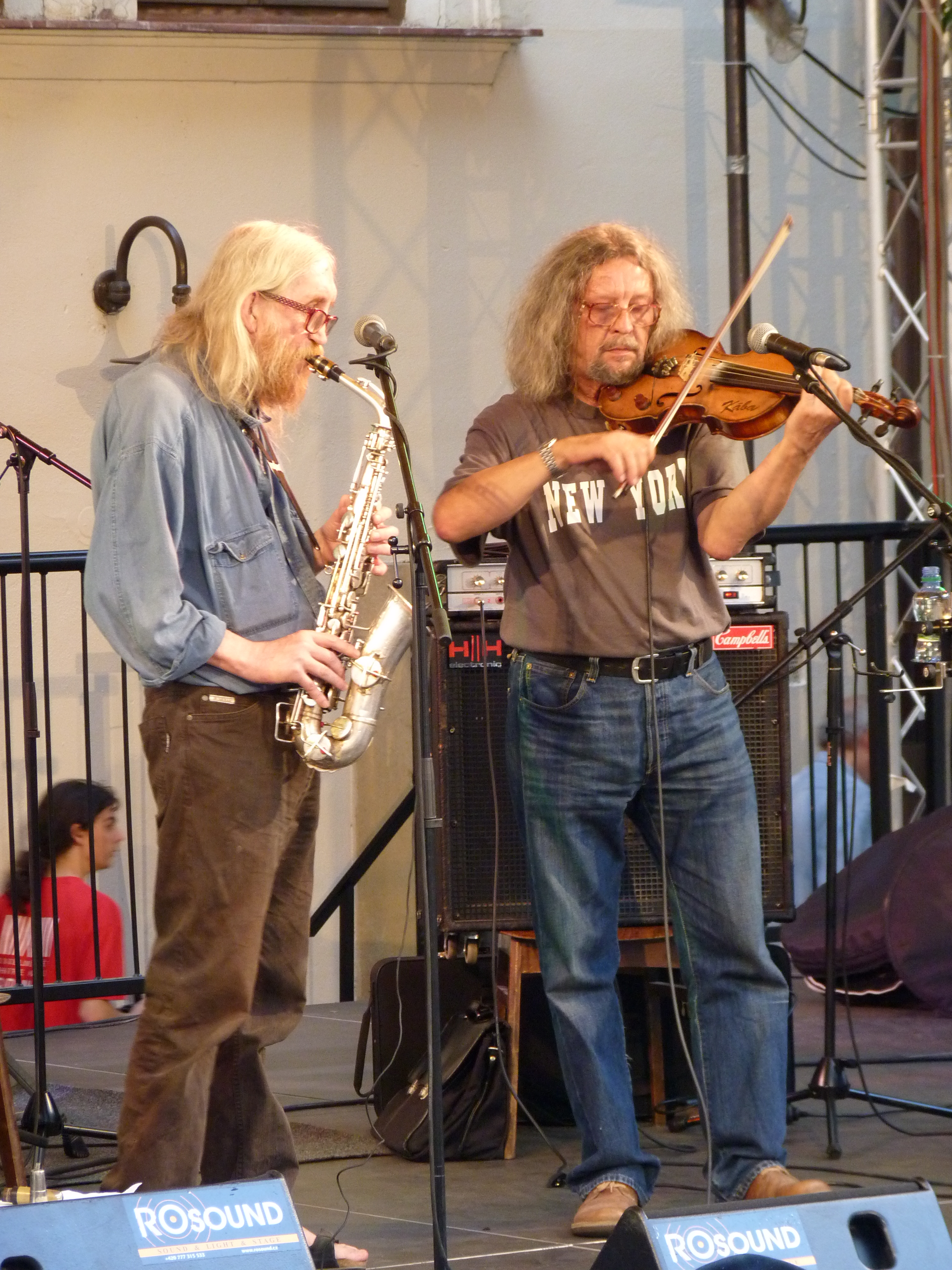
Vratislav Brabenec (L) and Jiří Kabeš, 2010

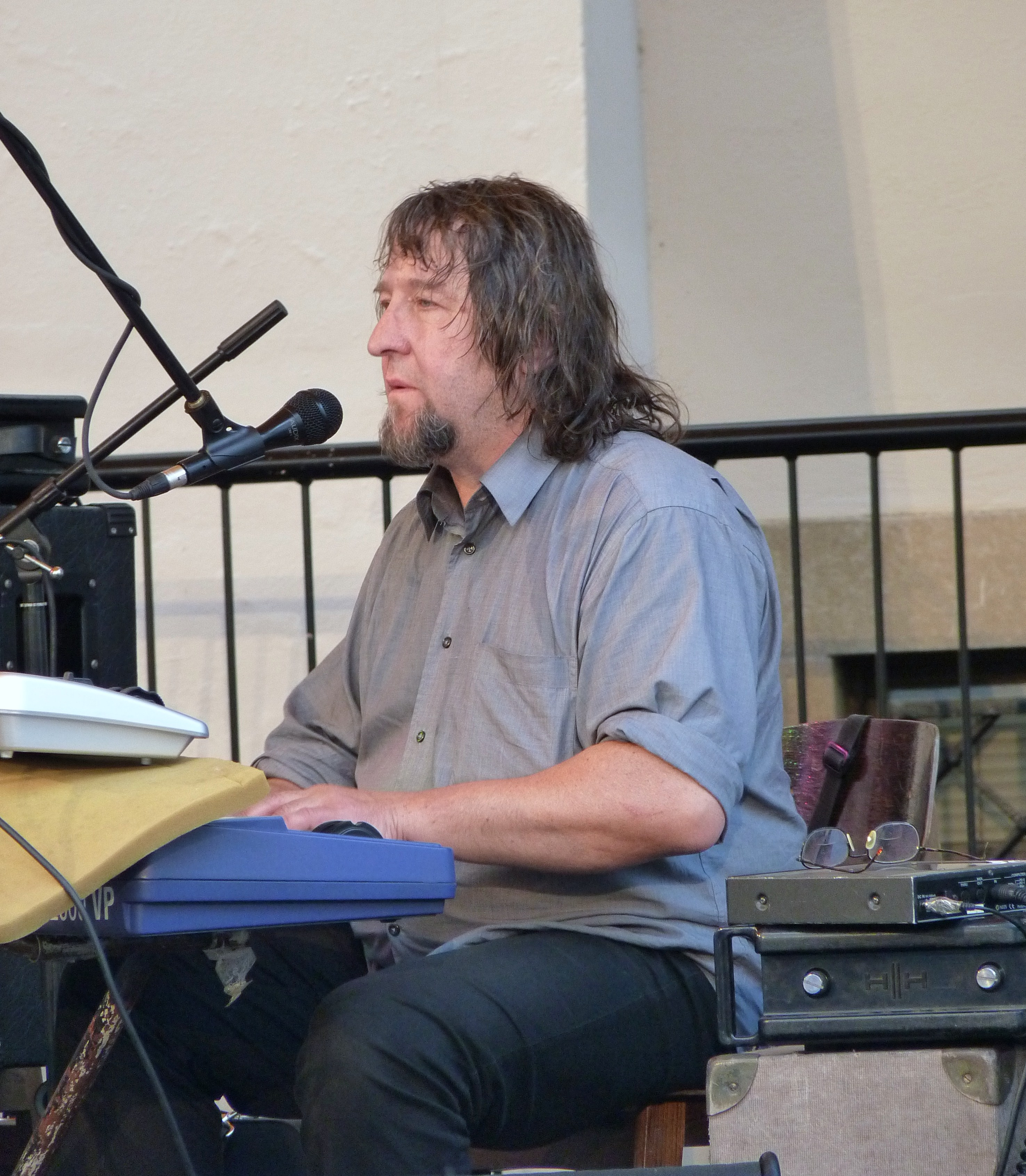
Josef Janíček (2010)

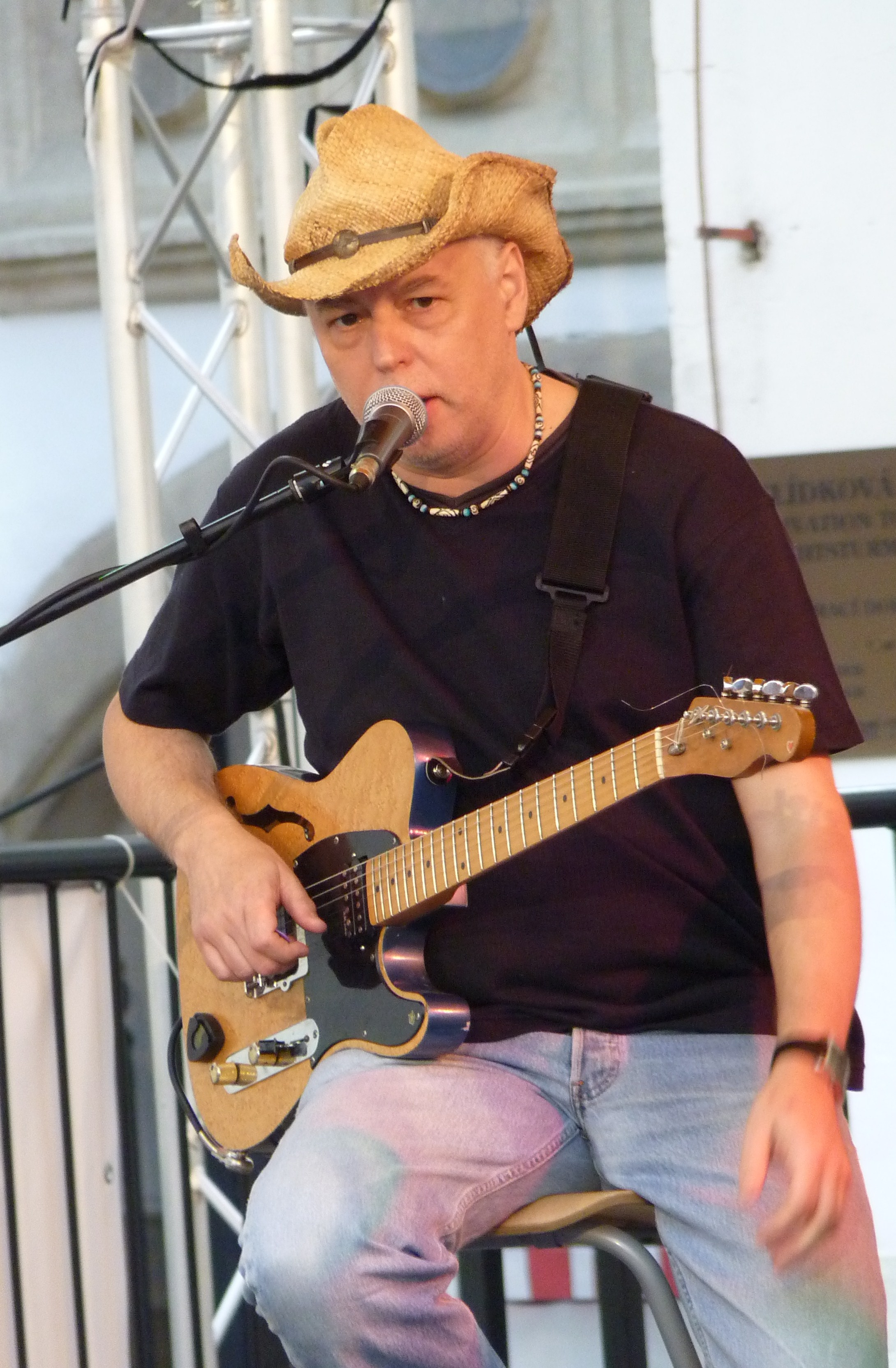
Josef Karafiát (2010)

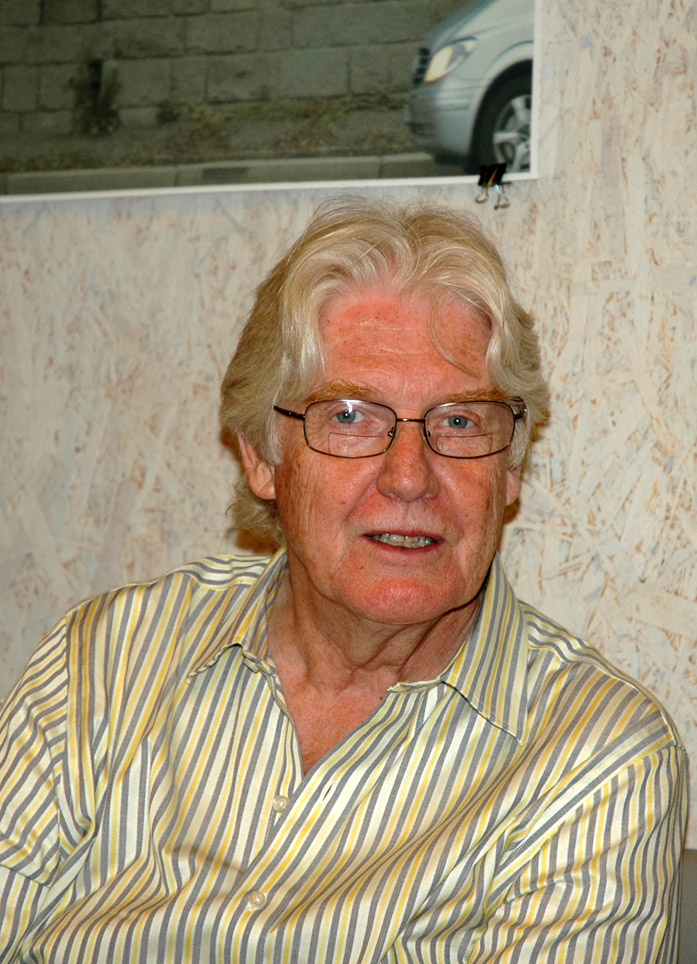
Paul Wilson, Prague, 2012

=== The Plastic People of the Universe ===
- Vratislav Brabenec – saxophone, clarinet, vocals (1972–1982, 1997–present)
- Josef Janíček – keyboards, vocals (1969–1988, 1997–present)
- Jaroslav Kvasnička – drums, vocals (2009–present)
- Johnny Judl jr. – bass, vocals (2016–present)
- David Babka – guitars (2016–present)

=== The Plastic People of the Universe/New Generation ===
- Jiří Kabeš – viola, theremin, vocals (1971–1988, 1997–present)
- Joe Karafiát – guitars, vocals (1997–present)
- Jakub Koláček – drums
- Wenca Březina – bass
- Vojtěch Starý – keyboards (2016–present)

=== Past members (selected) ===
- Milan "Mejla" Hlavsa – bass, vocals (1968–1988, 1997–2001)
- Michal Jernek – saxophone, clarinet, vocals (1968–1970)
- Jiří Števich – guitar, vocals (1968–1970, 1972)
- Josef Brabec – drums (1968–1969)
- Pavel Zeman – drums (1969–1973, 1977)
- Paul Wilson – guitar, vocals (1970–1972)
- Jan Jílek – trumpet (1972)
- Jiří Šula – drums (1973–1974)
- Jaroslav Vožniak – drums (1974–1977)
- Otakar Michl – guitar (1977)
- Jan Brabec – drums (1977–1988, 1997–1999)
- Pavel Zajíček – vocals (1978)
- Jaroslav Unger – vocals (1978)
- Ladislav Leština – electric violin, theremin (1978, 1980–1986)
- Ivan Bierhanzl – double bass (1978–1979, 2001–2009)
- Jan Schneider – percussion (1978)
- Josef "Bobeš" Rössler – clarinet, vocals (1980–1981)
- Petr Placák – clarinet (1983)
- Václav Stádník – clarinet (1983)
- Jan Macháček – guitar (1984)
- Vladimír Dědek – trombone (1984–1986)
- Milan Schelinger – guitar (1986–1987)
- Michaela Pohanková – vocals (1986–1988)
- Tomáš Schilla – cello (1986–1988)
- Ludvík "Eman" Kandl – drums (1999–2009)
- Eva Turnová – bass, vocals (2001–2015)
- Tomáš Skřivánek – bass (PPU/New Generation – 2016–2018)
- Jan Ježek – drums (PPU/New Generation – 2016–2018)

== Discography ==
Studio albums
Name	Year recorded	Released overseas	Released in ČR	Notes
Egon Bondy's Happy Hearts Club Banned	1975	Boží Mlýn (Canada), SCOPA Invisible (France), 1978	Globus, 2001	
Pašijové hry velikonoční	1978	Boží Mlýn, 1980	Globus, 1998	
Jak bude po smrti	1979		Globus, 1992	
Co znamená vésti koně	1981	Boží Mlýn, 1983	Globus, 2002	
Kolejnice duní	1977–1982		Globus, 2000	
Hovězí porážka	1984		Globus, 1992	
Půlnoční myš	1986	Freedonia (UK), 1987	Globus, 2001	
Líně s tebou spím / Lazy Love	2001		Globus, 2001	subtitled In Memoriam Mejla Hlavsa
Maska za maskou	2009		Guerilla, 2009	

Live albums
Name	Year recorded	Released in ČR	Notes
Muž bez uší	1969–1972	Globus, 2002	
Do lesíčka na čekanou	1973	Guerilla, 2006	Double album
Vožralej jak slíva	1973–1975	Globus, 1997	
Ach to státu hanobení	1976–1977	Globus, 2000	
Trouble Every Day	1971–1977	Globus, 2002	Covers
Bez ohňů je underground	1992	Globus, 1993	
The Plastic People of the Universe	1997	Aion/Globus, 1997	
Pašijové hry	2004	Knihy Hana s.r.o., 2004	with Agon Orchestra
Obešel já polí pět	2003	Guerilla, 2010	with Agon Orchestra
Non Stop Opera	2011	Guerilla, 2011	
Co znamená vésti koně	2015	Indies Happy Trails, 2017	with Brno Philharmonic
Apokalyptickej pták	1976	Galén, 2017	
Magické noci 1997	1997	Guerilla, 2021	
Pražský hrad live 1997	1997	Guerilla, 2022	

Compilations
Name	Released	Notes
10 let Globusu aneb underground v kostce	Globus, 2000	Double album
Milan Hlavsa – Než je dnes člověku 50 – poslední dekáda	Globus, 2001	Double album
Magor's Shem (40 Year Anniversary Tour PPU 1968–2008)	2008	
Vzpomínka na Mejlu – Live Fléda 2002 – 2013	2021	2-DVD tribute to Milan Hlavsa by PPU and others
