= Milan Smrčka =

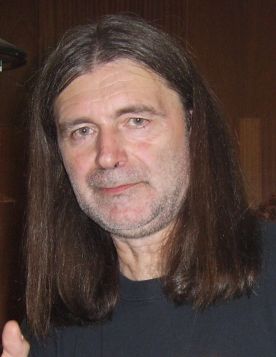
Milan Smrčka alias Záviš, 2006

Milan Smrčka, more known as Záviš (born 27 September 1956 in Znojmo), is a Czech singer, guitarist and poet. His work is most often classified as pornofolk. Záviš was admired even by Karel Gott.

== Works ==
- Určeno pro uši rabijáků (1998)
- Slunce v duši (2000)
- Záviš, syn vojáka (2001)
- Sejdeme se na věčnosti (2002)
- Radost pohledět (2004)
- Život je sranda (2005)
- Když prší (2006)
- Rolník a rorýsek (2007)
- Bože, já jsem vůl (2008)
- Závišova devátá (2009)
- "Záva & Pepa - Naživo za pivo" (2010)
- Nevytahuj mi ho prosím na veřejnosti (2012, vlastní náklad)
- K tomu nic (2014, Ears&Wind Records)
- Závišova dvanáctka (2016, Ears&Wind Records)
- U prdele (2018, Ears&Wind Records)
- Hrci-prci (2020, Ears&Wind Records)
- Výlet do Znojma (2022)
- Ryby, ryby, rak (2024)

=== Literary ===
- Oběšený Petr (1998)
- Konec zhuntovaného kavalíra (2001)
- Záviš, pacient Šafáře (2003)
- Ať žije republika (2005)
- Nedá se svítit (2007)
- "Prvé písně Závišovy" (2008)
- "Pičoviny" (2010)
