= Prague underground (culture) =

Underground culture in Czechoslovakia

The Czechoslovak underground or Prague underground was a dissident underground culture that developed in Communist Czechoslovakia, centred on Prague, especially around the 1970s during the normalization period. The movement was characterized by resistance to the political conformity and cultural consumerism encouraged by the mainstream, and was the target of repression by the communist regime which considered it political opposition.

The movement was mainly fuelled by counter-cultural artists such as the art rock bands DG 307 and The Plastic People of the Universe (including the art historian and poet Ivan Martin Jirous) and by samizdat literati such as Egon Bondy, living an alcohol-fuelled Bohemian lifestyle and inspired also by banned US artists such as Andy Warhol and The Velvet Underground. Significantly, however, when the imprisonment trial of the Plastic People sparked the creation of Charter 77, the movement was also joined by academics, Christians, and even former high-ranking Communist officials involved in the Prague Spring, who had all also been suppressed by the normalization regime in the wake of the Warsaw Pact invasion.

Despite the systematic imprisonment and repression of those involved with Charter 77, the movement eventually made a major contribution to the Velvet Revolution that completely ended the regime, in which formerly imprisonment underground writer Václav Havel became president.

== See also ==
- Dissident
- Mánička
