= Petr Placák =

Czech writer and musician

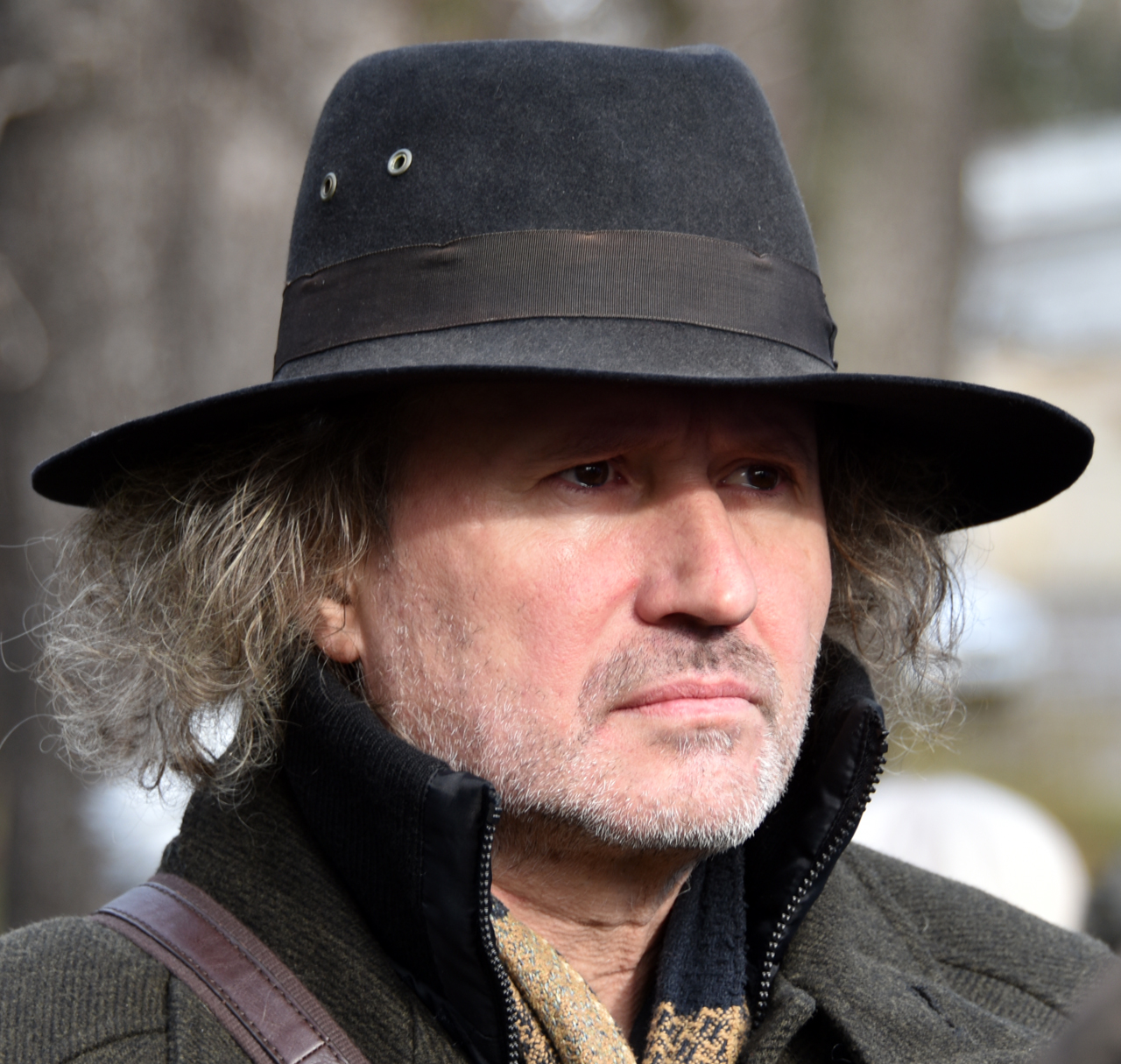
- Born: 8 January 1964 (age 62); Prague, Czechoslovakia
- Other name: Petr Zmrzlík
- Occupation: Writer

Petr Placák (born 8 January 1964 in Prague), also known under pseudonym Petr Zmrzlík, is a Czech writer. During the communist regime in Czechoslovakia he published his works in samizdat. He was clarinettist in the Plastic People of the Universe since 1983 and recorded two albums with this band: Hovězí porážka (1982) and Půlnoční myš (1986). Later he worked as a journalist for many newspapers, such as Respekt and Lidové noviny. In 1989, he was attacked by members of StB. They were punished in 2014.
