= Jiří Kabeš =

Czech musician (born 1946)

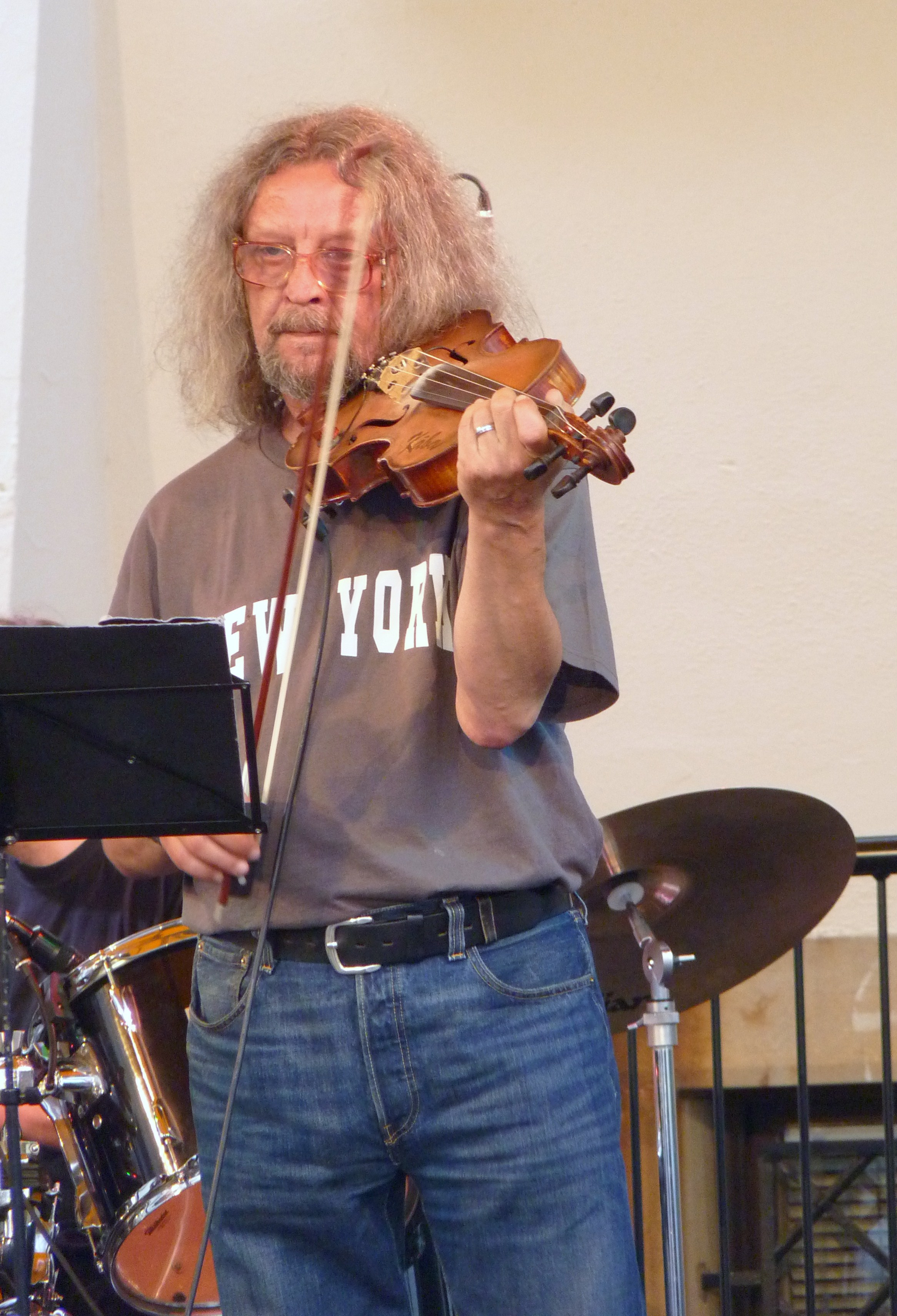
- Jiří Kabeš performing with the Plastic People of the Universe in 2010

Background information
- Also known as: Kába
- Born: 26 March 1946 (age 79); Křemín, Czechoslovakia
- Occupations: Musician; songwriter
- Instruments: Viola; violin; guitar; theremin; vocals
- Member of: The Velvet Underground Revival Band
- Formerly of: The Plastic People of the Universe; Old Teenagers; Půlnoc; Echt!

Jiří Kabeš, alias Kába (* 26 March 1946 in Křemín, Czechoslovakia) is a Czech rock singer, violist, violinist, guitarist, and songwriter. He was a longtime member of the Plastic People of the Universe where he played on viola and violin, occasionally sang and played on theremin. In the early seventies he played with rock'n'roll group the Old Teenagers. Since 1997 he is also a member of the Velvet Underground Revival Band, where he plays the guitar. He was also a member of Milan Hlavsa's bands Půlnoc and Echt!.

== Selected discography ==
=== with the Plastic People of the Universe ===
- Bez ohňů je underground (1992) – live album
- For Kosovo (1997) – live album
- The Plastic People of the Universe (1997) – live album
- Hovězí porážka (released: 1997, recorded: 1983–84)
- Jak bude po smrti (released: 1998, recorded: 1979)
- Pašijové hry velikonoční (released: 1998, recorded: 1978)
- Vožralej jak slíva (released: 1997, recorded: 1973–1975) – live album
- Ach to státu hanobení (released: 2000, recorded: 1976–77)
- Líně s tebou spím | Lazy Love / In Memoriam Mejla Hlavsa (2001)
- Egon Bondy's Happy Hearts Club Banned (released: 2001, recorded: 1974–75)
- Muž bez uší (released: 2002, recorded 1969–72) – live album
- Co znamená vésti koně (released: 2002, recorded: 1981)
- Do lesíčka na čekanou (released: 2006, recorded? 1973) – live album
- Maska za maskou (2009)
- Non Stop Opera (2011) – live album
