= Josef Janíček =

Czech musician (born 1947)

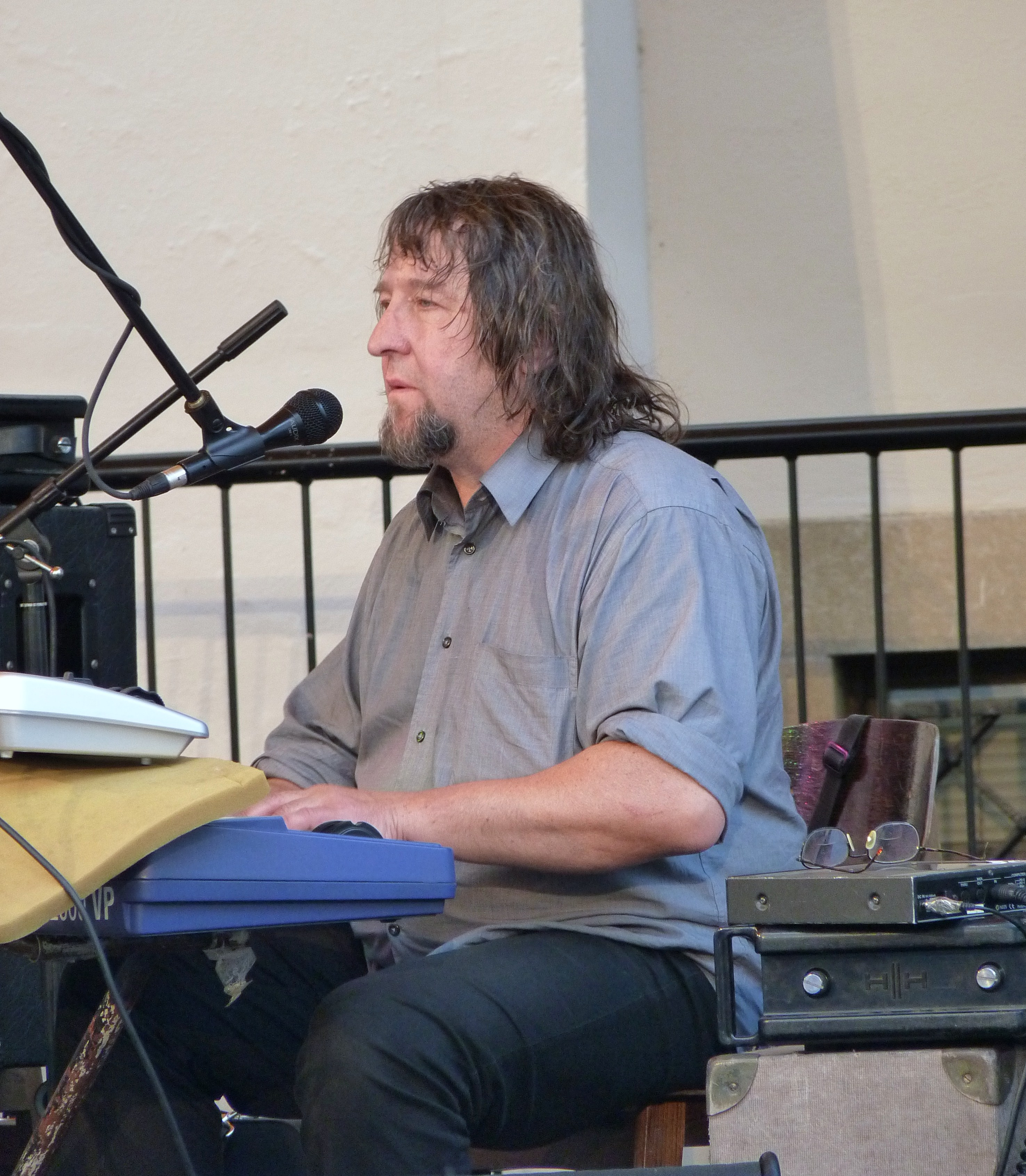
- Janíček with The Plastic People of the Universe in 2010

Background information
- Born: 28 December 1947 (age 78); Prague, Czechoslovakia
- Occupations: Musician, songwriter
- Instruments: Keyboards, accordion, guitar, vocals

Josef Janíček (born 28 December 1947) is a Czech rock keyboardist, singer, accordion and guitar player. He was a former guitarist of the Primitives Group; from 1969 he played with The Plastic People of the Universe. He was also a member of Milan Hlavsa's band called Půlnoc. Since 1990, he is a member of The Velvet Underground Revival Band.

== Life ==
Janíček was bown on 28 December 1947 in Prague, Czechoslovakia (now the Czech Republic).

== Discography ==
=== With The Plastic People of the Universe ===
- Bez ohňů je underground (1992) – live album
- For Kosovo (1997) – live album
- The Plastic People of the Universe (1997) – live album
- Hovězí porážka (released: 1997, recorded: 1983–84)
- Jak bude po smrti (released: 1998, recorded: 1979)
- Pašijové hry velikonoční (released: 1998, recorded: 1978)
- Vožralej jak slíva (released: 1997, recorded: 1973–1975) – live album
- Ach to státu hanobení (released: 2000, recorded: 1976–77)
- Líně s tebou spím | Lazy Love / In Memoriam Mejla Hlavsa (2001)
- Egon Bondy's Happy Hearts Club Banned (released: 2001, recorded: 1974–75)
- Muž bez uší (released: 2002, recorded 1969–72) – live album
- Co znamená vésti koně (released: 2002, recorded: 1981)
- Do lesíčka na čekanou (released: 2006, recorded? 1973) – live album
- Maska za maskou (2009)
- Non Stop Opera (2011) – live album

=== With Půlnoc ===
- Live Bratislava (1988)
- Půlnoc (1990)
- City of Hysteria (1991)
- Live in New York (1996) – live album
