= DG 307 =

Czech rock band

- Origin: Prague, Czechoslovakia
- Genres: Rock
- Years active: 1973–1980, 1992–2016
- Labels: Guerilla Records
- Past members: Pavel Zajíček; Milan Hlavsa; Jana Jonáková; Ivo Pospíšil; Ivan Bierhanzl; Tomáš Vtípil; Tomáš Schilla; Petr Fučík; Ivan Manolov; René Starhon; Antonín Korb; Otakar Michl; Pavel Cigánek; Michal Koval; Přemek Drozd; Dalibor Pyš; Oto Sukovský; Eva Turnová

DG 307 was a Czech underground rock band founded in 1973 in Prague by Milan Hlavsa and Pavel Zajíček. The group has been inactive since 2016.

== History ==
Bass guitarist Milan Hlavsa and poet Pavel Zajíček launched DG 307 in 1973, taking the name from a psychiatric diagnosis that allowed young men to obtain a blue booklet and thus avoid compulsory military service. Together with the Plastic People of the Universe, a band Hlavsa had also been a member of, DG 307, among other underground ensembles, was a target of persecution by the communist regime. The repression climaxed in 1976, when Zajíček was arrested and imprisoned for a year, allegedly for disorderly conduct. After his release, only two DG 307 concerts took place, in 1979. In 1980, Zajíček emigrated and the group went on indefinite hiatus. The Velvet Revolution in 1989 made it possible for Zajíček to return to his homeland, at which point he reestablished the band and became its lead singer. Since 2016, the group has been inactive due to Zajíček's health.

The only permanent member of DG 307 throughout its existence was Pavel Zajíček. The group had a rotating membership of musicians that at various times included Josef Janíček, Jan Sahara Hedl, and Eva Turnová.

== Partial list of band members ==
- Pavel Zajíček – vocals
- Milan Hlavsa – bass guitar
- Jana Jonáková – vocals
- Ivo Pospíšil – bass guitar
- Ivan Bierhanzl – bass guitar, double bass
- Tomáš Vtípil – violin, electronics
- Tomáš Schilla – cello
- Petr Fučík – drums
- Ivan Manolov – electric guitar
- René Starhon – drums
- Antonín Korb – drums
- Otakar "Alfréd" Michl – guitar
- Pavel Cigánek – guitar, violin
- Michal Koval – bass guitar
- Přemek Drozd – drums
- Dalibor Pyš – violin
- Oto Sukovský – bass guitar
- Eva Turnová – bass guitar

== Discography ==
- Gift to the Shadows (fragment) (1982)
- DG 307 (1973–75) (1990)
- Dar stínům (jaro 1979) (1992)
- Pták utrženej ze řetězu (podzim 1979) (1993)
- Torzo (léto 1980) (1993)
- Uměle ochuceno (Artificially flavored) (1992)
- Tvář jako Botticelliho Anděl (Live bootleg – 1995)
- Kniha psaná chaosem (1996)
- Siluety (1998)
- Koncert (1999)
- Šepoty a výkřiky (2002)
- Historie hysterie (1973–75 recordings) (2002)
- Nosferatu (soundtrack to the film Nosferatu – 2004))
- DG 307 – LIVE (17 April 2005) (2005)
- Květy podzimu – barvy jara /live at La Fabrika (2008)
- Veřejná zkouška/Public rehearsal Praha-New York (2009)
- Magický město vyhořelo (1994 live recording – 2008)
- V katedrálách ticha (1994 live recording – 2011)
- Životy? Nebo bludné kruhy? (2013)
- Svědek spálenýho času /komplet nahrávek z let 1979–1980 (5CDs – 2013)
