= Vratislav Brabenec =

Czech musician and author

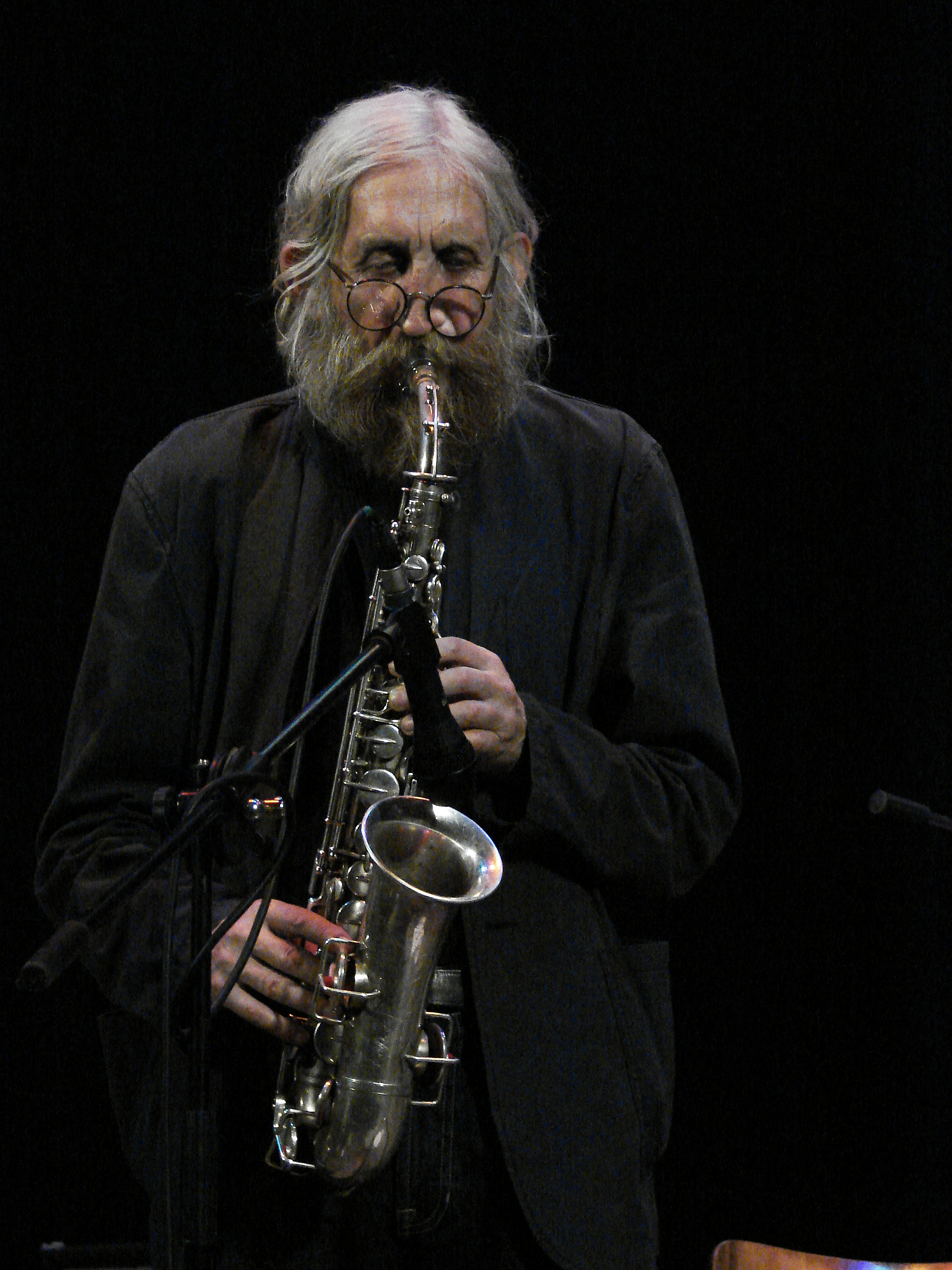
- At a concert in Kadaň.

Background information
- Born: April 28, 1943 (age 83); Prague
- Occupations: Musician, poet
- Instruments: Saxophone, clarinet
- Years active: 1972–present

Vratislav Brabenec (born 28 April 1943 in Prague) is a Czech musician and author, and a member of The Plastic People of the Universe.

== Life ==
Vratislav Brabenec was born in Prague into the family of a postal worker. He studied gardening at the Agricultural Secondary School in Mělník, and he practised gardening for several years after school. From 1964 until 1969 he studied theology at Comenius evangelical faculty in Prague, but he did not complete it. He worked in Great Britain in 1969, and when he returned to his homeland he worked for some gardening companies. In 1976 he was arrested and imprisoned for political reasons (March - November). When he was released after eight months, he signed Charta 77 and was forced to emigrate in 1982 as part of Akce Asanace. He lived in Canada from 1983 until 1997 (first in the east - meeting Josef Škvorecký and other Czech immigrants; then on the Sunshine Coast and finally on Vancouver Island) but since the Velvet Revolution he often visited Czechoslovakia (and after 1993 the Czech Republic). He returned to his homeland in 1997, and since then he has been pursuing a musical career and partly also working as a garden designer.

His wife Marie Benetková (born 1945) is a poet and artist. He has a daughter, Nikola.

== Music career ==
Vratislav Brabenec plays the alto saxophone, bass clarinet, clarinet and he also sings. He has been a member of The Plastic People of the Universe (PPU) and so he experienced the persecution of the 1970s in Czechoslovakia which, due to the banned concerts of PPU, led to Charta 77. He wrote much of the lyrics for the group with philosophical ("Jak bude po smrti" What it will be like after death with the use of texts by Ladislav Klíma) and religious themes ("Pašijové hry velikonoční" Easter Passion Play, first played in 1968 with the Spirituál kvintet). In 1997 he returned to the Czech Republic and joined a revival group. He also plays in the Sen noci svatojánské band.

== Literary career ==
His first poems were published in 1968 in a religious magazine Kostnické jiskry. He also published in samizdat editions. The only one solo samizdat was his Svědkové (Witnesses, 1978). He prepared another one in 1982 (Sebedudy) but it was not published until 1992. His poems are in close relation to music. He has published in most Czech literary and music magazines and collective volumes in the 1990s (e.g. Revolver Revue, Host, Rolling Stone, Rock & Pop etc.). In the last few years, Brabenec has appeared in several movies, usually about or with PPU (Milan Hlavsa, Plastic People of the Universe, 2001 or ...a bude hůř, 2007).

== Works ==
=== Books ===
- Sebedudy (1992)
- Vůl Hvězda Ranní (1998)
- Karlín přístav (1999; second [bilingual] edition 2021)
- Vážený pane K. (2001)
- Všude je střed světa (2005)
- Sebedudy a jiné texty z let 1966-1987 (2010)
- Evangelium podle Brabence (2010)
- Denver (2010)
- Pajasan (2016)
- Podoby (2016)
- Nevyžádaný příspěvek (2016)
- Tanec duchů (2017)
- Trdliště (2018)
- Garden Is Open (2018)
- Payday (2019)
- Legendy a čáry (2019)
- Eden: Třída sboru národní bezpečnosti (2020)
- Posvícení (2020)
- Podzim (2020)
- Život v Ječný (2021)
- Na ouvrati (2022)
- Vlk a plch: rozporky & rozprávky aj. (2022)
- Cestou na Bořeň (2023)

=== Music ===
- Konec léta (1995)
- Začni u stromu (2006)
- Kanadské vytí (2007)
- Létání je snadné (2013)
- Šaman bez kmene, bez rodu, bez prérie (2018)
- Růže na kmínku (2021)
- Nejsem na to zvyklá (2023)

== Filmography ==
- …a bude hůř (2007)
- Gorila (2011)
- Kovář z Podlesí (2013)
- Odborný dohled nad východem Slunce (2014)
- Odborný dohled nad výkladem snu (2018)
- Cena za štěstí (2019)
- Ztraceni v ráji (2020)
- Tichý společník (2021)
