= Svatopluk Karásek =

Czech politician (1942–2020)

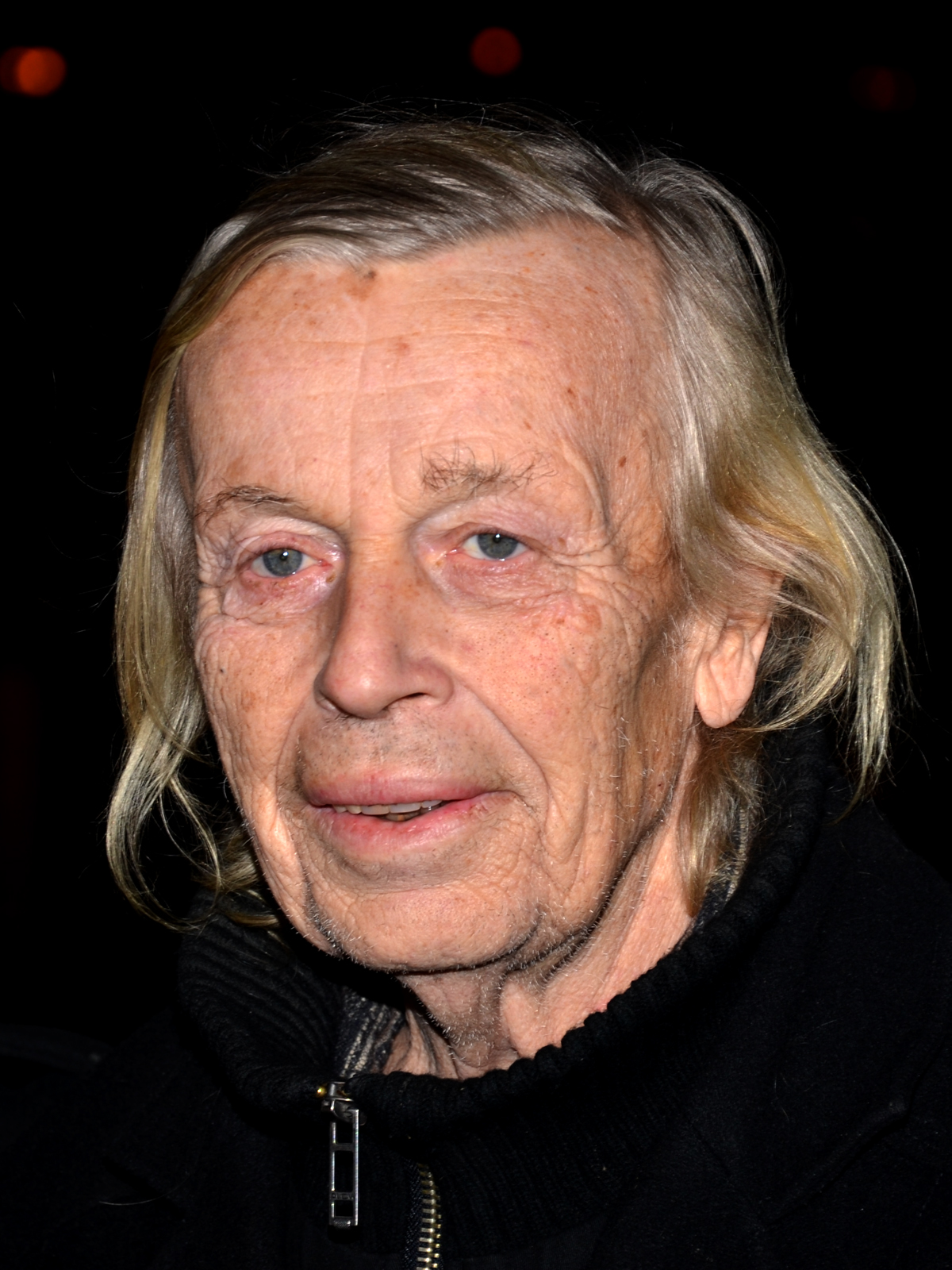
Karásek in 2015

Svatopluk Karásek (18 October 1942 – 20 December 2020) was a Czech singer, evangelical clergyman, and politician who served as a member of the Chamber of Deputies. His brother was the photographer Oldřich Karásek.

He was a signatory to Charter 77.
