= Milan Hlavsa =

Czech musician (1951–2001)

- Born: Milan Hlavsa; 6 March 1951
- Died: 5 January 2001 (aged 49)

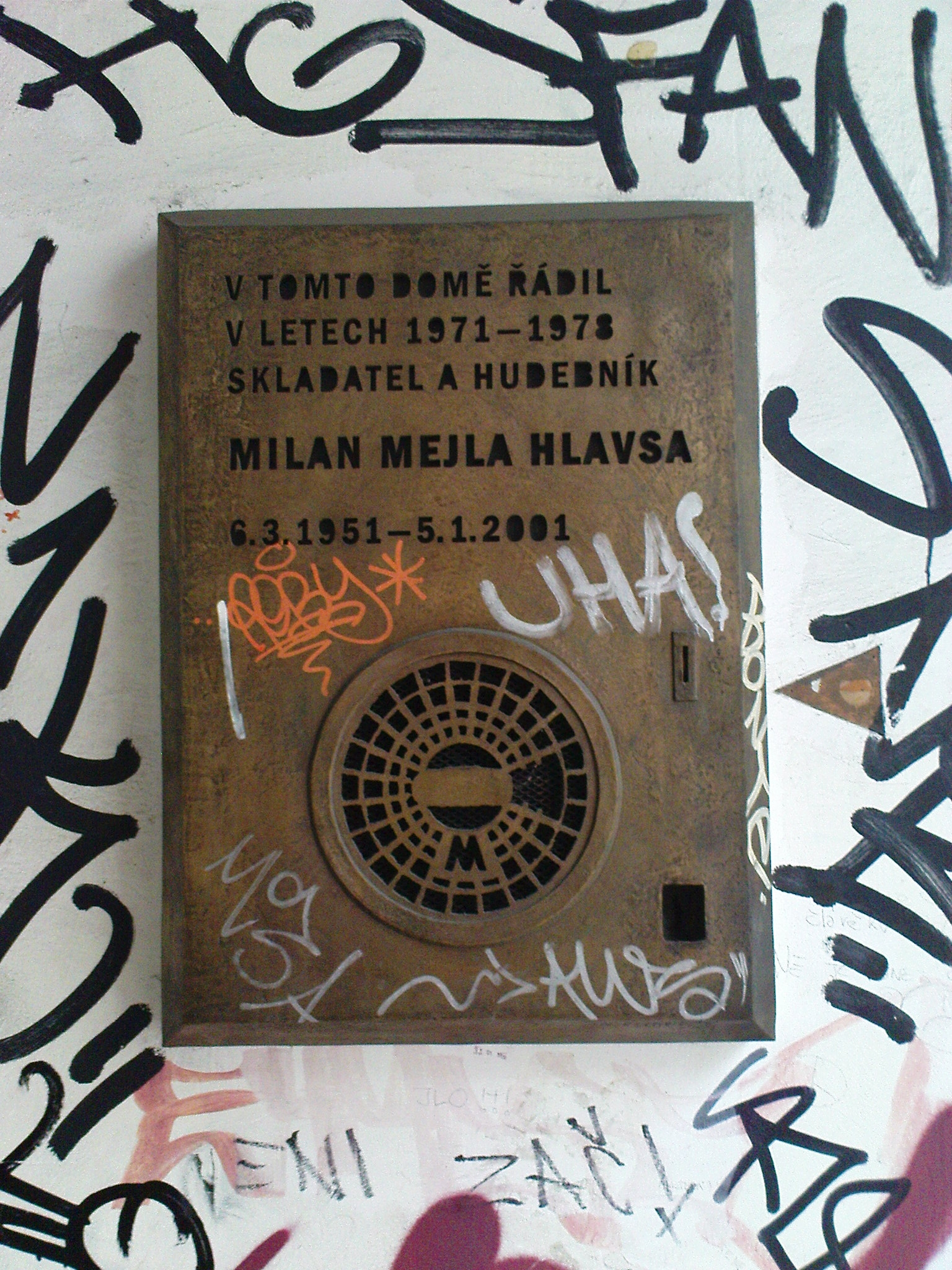
Metal box at the entrance to the house in Ječná street in Prague, where Hlavsa lived for most of his life and where all the important people of the "underground" culture had been meeting. If you insert a 10 crown coin into the slot, the biggest hit song of Milan Hlavsa, Muchomůrky bílé on YouTube, will start playing.

Milan "Mejla" Hlavsa (Prague, 6 March 1951 – 5 January 2001) was the founder, chief songwriter, and original bassist of the Czech band the Plastic People of the Universe, which was part of the inspiration for the anti-establishment movement Charter 77.

== Biography ==
=== Early life and musical exposure ===
Milan Hlavsa was born on 6 March 1951 in Prague, Czechoslovakia. His father was employed as a bank clerk. Hlavsa himself labored as a butcher's apprentice before he founded the Plastic People of the Universe (PPU) in 1968. Due to oppression by Czechoslovakia's communist regime, access to Western music was limited. Native Czechs maintained a link to the Western music world by obtaining albums from friends and family abroad. This is how a young Hlavsa developed an affinity for American rock and roll. He was also a part of the movement called máničky.

=== The formation of the Plastic People ===
In 1967, a friend of Hlavsa's introduced him to the music of The Velvet Underground. They would prove to be a tremendous influence, along with the music of Frank Zappa. At the time, Hlavsa was in a band known as The Primitives. In 1968, Hlavsa abandoned The Primitives and joined with Michal Jernek, Jiří Števich and Josef Brabec to form the Plastic People of the Universe.

=== Social impact ===
In 1970, two years after the Plastic People of the Universe were formed, the government stripped them of their professional license. Without this, they were unable to play legally. To circumvent the system, the members of the PPU took jobs working in the forest. They continued to perform despite minor skirmishes with the police. That year, the PPU were members of a festival that promoted "druhá kultura", or second culture. The communist regime denounced the festival, arrested the members of the PPU, and tried them on various charges. Three members were jailed, and a former member (Canadian Paul Wilson) was deported. Hlavsa, the founding member, was the only one who escaped without a sentence.

It was the arrest and trial of the PPU that would convince Václav Havel, along with others, to take action against the communist government. Their efforts would culminate in the organization Charter 77, which aimed to persuade the government to follow the UN Declaration of Human Rights and the Helsinki Accords, both of which the government had signed. This organization would be one of the most prominent dissident societies to arise in Czechoslovakia in opposition to the communist government.

Following their release from prison, the PPU would continue to perform discreetly until the government permitted them to play publicly in 1988.

=== Hiatus, Půlnoc, and reuniting the Plastic People ===
In 1988, the Czech government ended its 18-year-old policy of suppressing the PPU and allowed them to perform publicly. Unfortunately, the band split up soon afterwards. Hlavsa formed a new group called Půlnoc (which means "midnight" in Czech). The band included PPU keyboardist Josef Janíček and violist Jiří Kabeš. Půlnoc released City of Hysteria in the United States on Arista Records in 1991. In 1997, at Havel's suggestion, Hlavsa reunited with the other Plastic People of the Universe and performed a series of concerts to mark the 20th anniversary of Charter 77, the Czech declaration of human rights. In 1999, the PPU performed at the White House along with Lou Reed.

=== Death ===
On 2 January 2001 Hlavsa died of lung cancer. He was 49 years old.

== Discography ==
=== The Plastic People of the Universe ===
==== Live recordings ====
- Muž bez uší/ Man With No Ears (1969–72, 2002-Globus Music)
- Trouble Every Day (1971–77, 2002-Globus Music)
- Do lesíčka na čekanou (1973, 2006-Guerilla Records)
- Vožralej jak slíva/ Drunk Like A Plum (1973–1975, 1997-Globus International)
- Ach to státu hanobení/ Oh the State's Defamation (1976–1977)
- Hundred Points - single (1977, 1980-cassette, Eurock Dist. in USA)
- Jak bude po smrti/ What It's Like After Death (1979-cassette, S.T.C.V., 1992-Globus International)
- Bez ohňů je underground (live recordings 1992,1993-Globus International)
- 1997 (live recordings 1997,1997-Globus International)
- For Kosovo - single (1997, 1999-Global Music)

==== Studio albums ====
- Egon Bondy's Happy Hearts Club Banned (1974–1975, 1978-Boží Mlýny Productions in France, 1992-Globus International)
- Pašijové hry velikonoční/ Passion Play (1978, 1980-Boží Mlýny Productions in Canada, 1998-Globus International)
- Co znamená vésti koně/ Leading Horses (1981), 1983-Boží Mlýny Productions in Canada, 2002-Globus Music)
- Kolejnice duní/ Railways Rumble (1977–1982, 2000-Globus Music)
- Hovězí porážka/ Beefslaughter (1983–1984, 1984-cassette, S.T.C.V., 1997-Globus International)
- Půlnoční myš/ Midnight Mouse (1985–1986, 1987-Freedonia Records in Netherlands, 2001-Globus Music)
- Líně s tebou spím/ Lazy Love In Memoriam Mejla Hlavsa (2001-Globus Music)

=== DG 307 ===
- DG 307 (1973–75, 1990-Globus International)
- Uměle ochuceno/Artificially flavored (1992-Újezd)
- Historie hysterie (1973–1975, 2004-Guerilla records)
- V katedrálách ticha (live recordings 1994, 2011-Guerilla records)

=== Garáž ===
- No. 1 (1981, 1993-Radost Music)
- Demo (1987, 1991-Globus International)
- Vykopávky (LP 1990-Globus International)
- Praha/ Prague (CD 1992- Radost Music)
- No parking! (1993- Monitor)

=== Půlnoc ===
- Půlnoc/ Midnight (1990-Globus International)
- City of hysteria (1991-Arista Records)
- Lou Reed & John Cale, The Velvet Underground, Půlnoc – The Velvet Underground Reunion 15 6 90 (Vinyl 2017-Radost Music)

=== Fiction ===
- Fiction (1994-Popron music)
- Básníci ticha/ Poets of the Silence – maxisingl (1995-Popron music)
- Neverending Party – A Tribute to Velvet Underground (1995-Globus International)
- Noc a den (1996- Indies Records)

=== Solo ===
- Magická noc (together with Jan Vozáry, 1997)
- Šílenství (1999)

=== Other albums ( as a guest ) ===
- Krysa – Bigbítovej podraz (1991)
- Lorien – Unplugged (1994)

=== O.S.T. ===
- Kanárek/ The Canary (1999)

== Memorable Concerts ==
=== 19.4.1990 - ULUV, Prague, Czech Republic - Lou Reed solo + w/Pulnoc & Velvet Revival Band ===
Lou Reed traveled to Prague in April 1990 to interview Czech president Vaclav Havel. Later that night, Reed was taken to a club where a band Pulnoc was playing. Reed joined them on stage where they performed for Havel and 300 of his friends.

Lou Reed : "I suddenly realized the music sounded familiar. They were playing Velvet Underground songs „ beautiful, heartfelt, impeccable versions of my songs.To say I was moved would be an understatement."

Ivo Pospisil (Czech underground musician, member of DG 307 and Garage, interviewed by Ian Willoughby, Czech Radio)

“It was some kind of a full stop. We’d been living in the mistaken conviction that The Velvet Underground had an ‘underground’ agenda – as we had – and rejected the mainstream. We later learned this was far from the case. We had it in our heads that their ‘underground outlook’ was, in a way, supporting our lives in the underground under socialism.”

“For us, Lou Reed was a god, you could say the biggest god, of the underground ideal and of our musical world. And suddenly our god was here and playing at the Úluv gallery. But he behaved very oddly, in a hostile manner, you could say. So for me the Lou Reed that I had previously had in my mind came to an end that evening.”
