= History of Czechoslovakia (1989–1992) =

The last period in Czechoslovak history began with the Velvet Revolution from 17 to 28 November 1989 that overthrew the communist government, and ended with the dissolution of Czechoslovakia on 1 January 1993.

== Velvet Revolution ==
=== Background ===
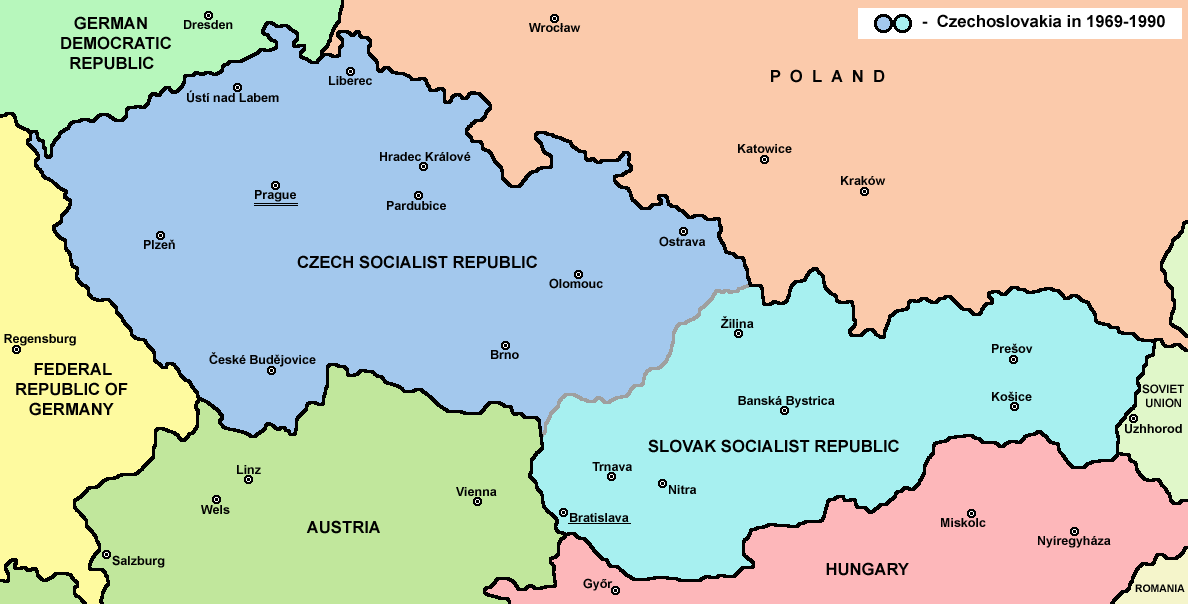
Czechoslovakia in 1969-1990

Although in March 1987 Gustáv Husák nominally committed Czechoslovakia to follow the program of perestroika, he nevertheless cautioned the party in October 1987 not to "hasten solutions too quickly" so as to "minimize the risks that could occur." (1 December 1987)

On 17 December 1987 Husák resigned as head of the Communist Party of Czechoslovakia (KSC). He retained, however, his post of president of Czechoslovakia and his full membership on the Presidium of the KSC. Husák's resignation was caused by failing health and by the increasing ambitions of the party members Miloš Jakeš, Ladislav Adamec, and Vasil Biľak which had been apparent since the spring of 1987. Miloš Jakeš, who replaced Husák as first secretary of the KSC, was sixty-five years of age at the time of his assumption of the most powerful post in the country. Other than the age difference and the fact that Jakeš was a Czech whereas Husák is a Slovak, there was little to distinguish the new leader from his predecessor. In his first pronouncements as the head of the KSC, Jakes assured the KSC's Central Committee that he would continue the cautious and moderate path of reform set forth by Husák. He called for a large-scale introduction of new technology as the means to "fundamentally increase the efficiency of the Czechoslovak economy."; However, he also warned that there would be no "retreat from the fundamental principles of socialism," adding that the party had learned well the "lesson from 1968-69 and know[s] where such a retreat leads." At the same time, Jakeš acknowledged Soviet pressure for reform by pledging to pursue economic restructuring, stating that "just as Soviet Communists, we too must observe the principle that more democracy means more socialism."

The Czechoslovak version of perestroika, which had slowly taken shape during the last months of Husák's rule under the guidance of the reformist and pro-Mikhail Gorbachev Czechoslovak Premier Lubomír Štrougal, called for a modest decentralization of state economic administration but postponed any concrete action until the end of the decade. The slow pace of the Czechoslovak reform movement was an irritant to the Soviet leadership. Economically, however, it was surely partly because on the one hand there were no serious economic problems at the standard-of-living level in Czechoslovakia as opposed to e.g. Poland, the Soviet Union and Hungary, and on the other hand the catastrophic initial effects of the reforms in the Soviet Union and Hungary could already be seen in the late 1980s. A corroboration of this might be the fact that Gustáv Husák, before his resignation in 1989 (see Velvet Revolution), told to the newly appointed anti-Communist government they could expect very difficult years to come. The dissatisfaction of many ordinary Czechs and Slovaks was increasing, due to the rigid political situation and lack of freedom, but mainly because they could view foreign TV channels in some regions (West German in frontier Bohemia, Austrian in southwestern Slovakia (including the capital Bratislava)), and due to the gradual spread of VCRs in the late 1980s, the way of living in Western Europe and in the USA.

In December 1987, some 500,000 Catholics in Czechoslovakia signed a petition for religious freedom. It was the biggest petition of that sort in central Europe.

The first anti-Communist demonstration took place on 25 March 1988 – the Candle demonstration. An unauthorized peaceful gathering of some 2,000 (other sources 10,000) Catholics in the Slovak capital Bratislava, organized by the Slovak Catholic dissenters and demanding religious freedom and civic rights, was violently dispersed by the police force. Some 100 participants were arrested. Leading Communist functionaries (e.g., the Slovak prime minister, minister of the interior, minister of culture) observed the whole operation from the windows of the nearby hotel Carlton.

Demonstrations also occurred on 28 October 1988 (the anniversary of the establishment of Czechoslovakia in 1918) in Prague, Bratislava and some other towns. The establishment of "capitalist" Czechoslovakia on 28 October only became a public holiday in September 1988 in the Communist Czechoslovakia. Further demonstrations followed in January 1989 (commemorating the 20th anniversary of the death of Jan Palach on 16 January 1969), on 21 August 1989 (the 21st anniversary of the Soviet military intervention in 1968) and on 28 October 1989 (see above).

=== The Revolution ===
The anti-Communist revolution started on 16 November 1989 in Bratislava, with a demonstration of Slovak university students for democracy, and continued with the well-known similar demonstration of Czech students in Prague on 17 November. The entire Politburo, including Jakeš, resigned on 24 November. Five days later, the Federal Assembly deleted the provisions of the Constitution enshrining the Communist Party's "leading role."

== Following the Velvet Revolution ==
In December 1989, Husák, who had remained president after giving up leadership of the party, swore in a coalition government in which Communists had a minority of ministerial positions even though it was headed by a Communist. He resigned shortly after presiding over the formal end of the regime he had largely created.

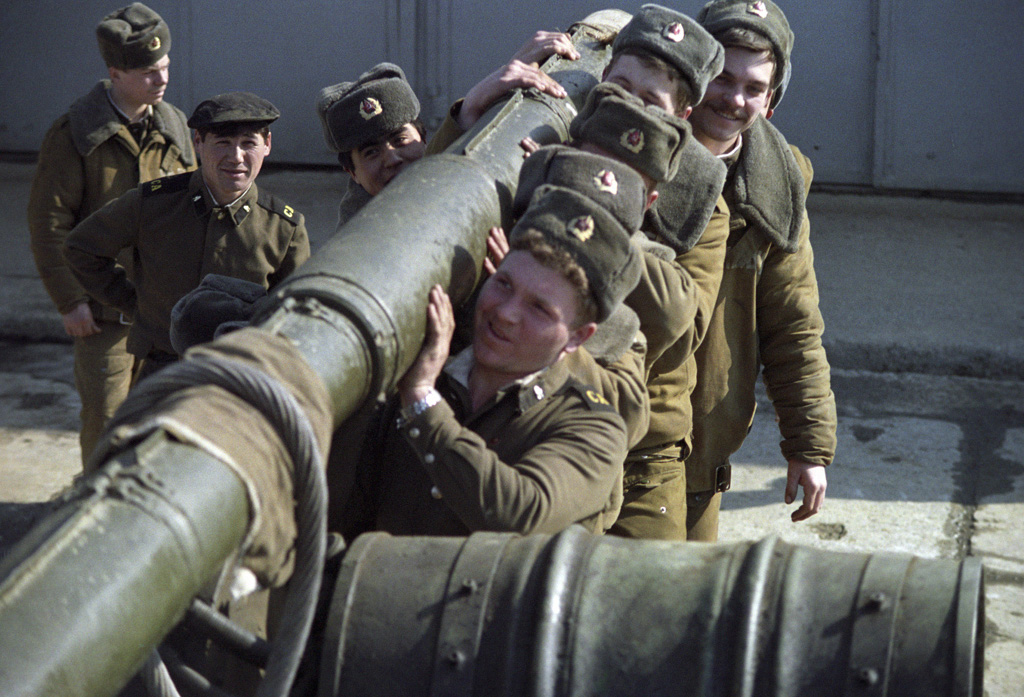
Withdrawal of Soviet troops from Czechoslovakia in accordance with the agreement of 1990 between the Governments of the USSR and Czech Socialist Republic

The first free elections in Czechoslovakia since 1946 took place in June 1990 without incident and with more than 95% of the population voting. As anticipated, Civic Forum and Public Against Violence won landslide victories in their respective republics and gained a comfortable majority in the federal parliament. The parliament undertook substantial steps toward securing the democratic evolution of Czechoslovakia. It successfully moved toward fair local elections in November 1990, ensuring fundamental change at the county and town level.

Civic Forum found, however, that although it had successfully completed its primary objective—the overthrow of the communist regime—it was ineffectual as a governing party. The demise of Civic Forum was viewed by most as necessary and inevitable.

By the end of 1990, unofficial parliamentary "clubs" had evolved with distinct political agendas. Most influential was the Civic Democratic Party, headed by Václav Klaus. Other notable parties that came into being after the split were the Czech Social Democratic Party, Civic Movement, and Civic Democratic Alliance.

== Dissolution of Czechoslovakia ==
On 25 November 1992 Czechoslovakia's parliament (the Federal Assembly) voted to split the country into the Czech Republic and Slovakia starting on 1 January 1993.

== See also ==
- Economy of the Czech Republic#1989–1995
