= 1988 in Czechoslovakia =

- Decades: 1960s; 1970s; 1980s; 1990s
- See also: Other events of 1988; History of Czechoslovakia; Years in Czechoslovakia

Events from the year 1988 in Czechoslovakia. The year saw the candle demonstration in Bratislava.

== Incumbents ==
- President: Gustáv Husák.
- Prime Minister:
  - Lubomír Štrougal (until 12 October)
  - Ladislav Adamec (from 12 October)

== Events ==
- 25 March – The candle demonstration in Bratislava, led by the Catholic Church requesting religious freedom, is repressed with 190 people arrested.
- 21 August – Large anti-government demonstrations are held in Prague to mark the 20th anniversary of the Warsaw Pact invasion of Czechoslovakia.
- 11 October – A ČSA Tupolev Tu-134A (registration OK-AFB) landed hard at Ruzyne Airport; there were no casualties, but the aircraft was written off and flown to Piešťany where it served as a restaurant.

== Popular culture ==
=== Film ===
- Alice, directed and written by Jan Švankmajer, is released.
- How Poets Are Enjoying Their Lives (Czech: Jak básníkům chutná život), directed by Dušan Klein is released.
- The Jester and the Queen (Czech: Šašek a královna), directed by Věra Chytilová, is released in English.

=== Music ===
- The band Půlnoc is formed by members of The Plastic People of the Universe. They perform in New York in July,

== Births ==
- 9 December – Veronika Vítková, biathlete, winner of the silver medal at the 2014 Winter Olympics.

== Deaths ==
- 3 January – John Dopyera, inventor of the resonator guitar (born 1893).
- 17 April – Daniel Rapant, historian (born 1897).
- 29 April – Jan Kapr, composer (born 1914).
- 21 December – Ján Cikker, composer (born 1911).
