= 1984 in Czechoslovakia =

- Decades: 1960s; 1970s; 1980s; 1990s
- See also: Other events of 1984; History of Czechoslovakia; Years in Czechoslovakia

Events from the year 1984 in Czechoslovakia.

== Incumbents ==
- President: Gustáv Husák.
- Prime Minister: Lubomír Štrougal.

== Events ==
- 13 May – Czechoslovakia declares that it will not send a team to Los Angeles as part of the 1984 Summer Olympics boycott.
- 22 July – The women's national tennis team win the Federation Cup.
- August – AZNP start manufacturing the facelifted Škoda Rapid.
- October – The jazz section of the Czech Union of Musicians is disbanded.
- 17 December – Tomáš Šmíd is ranked world number 1 doubles tennis player.

== Popular culture ==
=== Film ===
- Slunce, seno, jahody, directed by Zdeněk Troška, is released.
- The Snowdrop Festival (Czech: Slavnosti sněženek), directed by Jiří Menzel, is released.

=== Literature ===
- Jaroslav Seifert wins the 1984 Nobel Prize in Literature.

== Births ==
- 15 January – Zuzana Rehák-Štefečeková, sports shooter, winner of a gold medal at the 2020 Summer Olympics.

== Deaths ==
- 24 September – Zuzka Zguriška, novellist and play-writer (born 1900).
- 20 November – Alexander Moyzes, composer (born 1906).
