= 1981 in Czechoslovakia =

- Decades: 1960s; 1970s; 1980s; 1990s
- See also: Other events of 1981; History of Czechoslovakia; Years in Czechoslovakia

Events from the year 1981 in Czechoslovakia.

== Incumbents ==
- President: Gustáv Husák.
- Prime Minister: Lubomír Štrougal.

== Popular culture ==
=== Film ===
- That Instant, That While (Czech: Ta chvíle, ten okamžik), directed by Jiří Sequens, is released.

== Births ==
- 30 June – Barbora Špotáková, gold medal winner in the javelin at the 2008 and 2012 Olympics.

== Deaths ==
- 5 January – Jana Černá, poet and writer (born 1928).
