= 1982 in Czechoslovakia =

- Decades: 1960s; 1970s; 1980s; 1990s
- See also: Other events of 1982; History of Czechoslovakia; Years in Czechoslovakia

Events from the year 1982 in Czechoslovakia.

== Incumbents ==
- President: Gustáv Husák.
- Prime Minister: Lubomír Štrougal.

== Popular culture ==
=== Film ===
- Incomplete Eclipse (Czech: Neúplné zatmení), directed by Jaromil Jireš, is released.
- She Grazed Horses on Concrete (Slovak: Pásla kone na betóne), directed by Štefan Uher, is released.

== Births ==
- 10 November – Katarína Roth Neveďalová, Slovak politician.

== Deaths ==
- 13 May – Věra Suková, tennis player (born 1931).
