= 1980 in Czechoslovakia =

- Decades: 1960s; 1970s; 1980s; 1990s
- See also: Other events of 1980; History of Czechoslovakia; Years in Czechoslovakia

Events from the year 1980 in Czechoslovakia.

== Incumbents ==
- President: Gustáv Husák.
- Prime Minister: Lubomír Štrougal.

== Popular culture ==
=== Film ===
- Cutting It Short (Czech: Postřižiny), directed by Jiří Menzel, is released.
- The Tale of John and Mary Czech: Pohádka o Honzíkovi a Mařence), the last film directed by Karel Zeman, is released.

== Births ==
- 19 September – Miroslava Knapková, rower, gold medal winner at the 2012 Olympics.

== Deaths ==
- 5 January – Helena Bochořáková-Dittrichová, illustrator and painter (born 1894).
