= 1986 in Czechoslovakia =

- Decades: 1960s; 1970s; 1980s; 1990s
- See also: Other events of 1986; History of Czechoslovakia; Years in Czechoslovakia

Events from the year 1986 in Czechoslovakia.

== Incumbents ==
- President: Gustáv Husák.
- Prime Minister: Lubomír Štrougal.

== Events ==
- 23 May – Parliamentary elections are held with 99.39 percent turnout.
- 20 October – Abortion is fully legalised in the Czech Socialist Republic. The law came into effect in the Slovak Socialist Republic three days later.

== Popular culture ==
=== Film ===
- Forbidden Dreams (Czech: Smrt krásných srnců), directed by Karel Kachyňa is released.
- Krysař, directed by Jiří Barta, is released. The film was later released in English under the title The Pied Piper.
- Scalpel, Please (Czech: Skalpel, prosím), directed by Jiří Svoboda, is released.

== Births ==
- 19 December – Zuzana Hejnová, winner of the silver medal in athletics at the 2012 Summer Olympics.

== Deaths ==
- 10 January – Jaroslav Seifert, writer, winner of the 1984 Nobel Prize in Literature (born 1901).
- 15 January – Anna Zemánková, artist (born 1908).
- 27 August – Olga Šilhánová, gymnast, gold medal winner at the 1948 Summer Olympics (born 1920).
- 9 November – Jaroslava Muchová, artist (born 1909).
