= 1987 in Czechoslovakia =

- Decades: 1960s; 1970s; 1980s; 1990s
- See also: Other events of 1987; History of Czechoslovakia; Years in Czechoslovakia

Events from the year 1987 in Czechoslovakia.

== Incumbents ==
- President: Gustáv Husák.
- Prime Minister: Lubomír Štrougal.

== Events ==
- 21 February – The 1987 Winter Universiade opens in Štrbské Pleso, closing seven days later.
- July – The fourth and final reactor in the Dukovany Nuclear Power Station is put into operation.
- 17 December – Gustáv Husák resigns as General Secretary of the Communist Party of Czechoslovakia.

== Popular culture ==
=== Film ===
- Why? (Czech: Proč?), directed by Karel Smyczek is released.
- Princess Jasnenka and the Flying Shoemaker (Czech: O princezně Jasněnce a létajícím ševci), directed by Zdeněk Troška, is released.

== Births ==
- 27 May – Martina Sáblíková, winner of the gold medal in speed skating at the 2010 and 2014 Winter Olympics.

== Deaths ==
- 6 May – Stanislav Lusk, rower, gold medal winner at the 1952 Summer Olympics (born 1931).
