= 1985 in Czechoslovakia =

- Decades: 1960s; 1970s; 1980s; 1990s
- See also: Other events of 1985; History of Czechoslovakia; Years in Czechoslovakia

Events from the year 1985 in Czechoslovakia.

== Incumbents ==
- President: Gustáv Husák.
- Prime Minister: Lubomír Štrougal.

== Events ==
- 9 May – Milán Václavík addresses a Czechoslovak Army military parade.
- 14 October – The women's national tennis team win the Federation Cup.
- 7 November – Prime Minister Lubomír Štrougal meets the President of Cuba, Fidel Castro, in Havana.

== Popular culture ==
=== Film ===
- How Poets Are Losing Their Illusions (Czech: Jak básníci přicházejí o iluze), directed by Dušan Klein is released.
- My Sweet Little Village (Czech: Vesničko má středisková), directed by Jiří Menzel is released.
- Give the Devil His Due (Czech: S čerty nejsou žerty), directed by Hynek Bočan, is released.
- The Feather Fairy (Slovak: Perinbaba), directed by Juraj Jakubisko, is released.
- Dissolved and Effused (Czech: Rozpuštěný a vypuštěný), directed by Ladislav Smoljak, is released.

=== Literature ===
- Václav Havel publishes Letters to Olga (Czech: Dopisy Olze).

== Births ==
- 2 February – Lenka Hyková, sports shooter, winner of a silver medal at the 2004 Summer Olympics.
- 11 February – Šárka Záhrobská, winner of the bronze medal in women's slalom at the 2010 Winter Olympics.

== Deaths ==
- 17 June – Josef Klapuch, freestyle wrestler, winner of a silver medal in wrestling at the 1936 Summer Olympics (born 1906).
- 26 June – Jaroslav Kožešník, scientist, chairman of the Czechoslovak Academy of Sciences (born 1907).
