= 1983 in Czechoslovakia =

- Decades: 1960s; 1970s; 1980s; 1990s
- See also: Other events of 1983; History of Czechoslovakia; Years in Czechoslovakia

Events from the year 1983 in Czechoslovakia.

== Incumbents ==
- President: Gustáv Husák.
- Prime Minister: Lubomír Štrougal.

== Events ==
- 24 July – The women's national tennis team win the Federation Cup.
- 31 August – The minor planet 7390 Kundera, named after the playwright Milan Kundera, is discovered.

== Popular culture ==
=== Film ===
- The Very Late Afternoon of a Faun (Faunovo velmi pozdní odpoledne), directed by Věra Chytilová, is released.

== Deaths ==
- 9 January – Jarmila Kröschlová, choreographer of modern dance (born 1893).
