= 1989 in Czechoslovakia =

- Decades: 1960s; 1970s; 1980s; 1990s
- See also: Other events of 1989; History of Czechoslovakia; Years in Czechoslovakia

Events from the year 1989 in Czechoslovakia. The year was marked by the Velvet Revolution, which started with student demonstrations on 17 November. It ended with the resignation of the President and Prime Minister, the end of the dominance of the Communist Party and the election of the Václav Havel, the first President of free Czechoslovakia.

== Incumbents ==
- President:
  - Gustáv Husák (until 10 December).
  - Václav Havel (from 29 December).
- Prime Minister:
  - Ladislav Adamec (until 7 December).
  - Marián Čalfa (from 7 December).

== Events ==
- 16 January – At a large demonstration to mark 20 years since the suicide of Jan Palach, future president Václav Havel is arrested.
- 1 May – A demonstration against human rights violations during the International Workers' Day celebrations is dispersed by police.
- 7 August – The 1989 Czechoslovak Open starts, running until 13 August.
- 17 November – The Velvet Revolution commences. 140 people are injured when riot police attack a student demonstration.
- 19 November – Civic Forum is formed by opposition groups to the Communist Party of Czechoslovakia.
- 28 November – Civic Forum is recognised as a legal organisation.
- 4 December – The members of the Warsaw Pact, except Romania, condemn the 1968 invasion of Czechoslovakia.
- 10 December – President Gustáv Husák swears in a new cabinet, the first without a majority from the Communist Party of Czechoslovakia since the 1948 coup d'état, and then immediately resigns.
- 14 December – New foreign minister Jiří Dienstbier declares that the agreement for Soviet troops to be stationed in Czechoslovakia is invalid.
- 28 December – Alexander Dubček is elected chairman of the Federal Assembly.
- 29 December – Václav Havel unanimously wins the presidential election to become the first President of free Czechoslovakia.

== Popular culture ==
=== Film ===
- Tainted Horseplay, originally titled A Hoof Here, a Hoof There (Czech: Kopytem sem, kopytem tam), directed by Věra Chytilová, is released.
- I Love, You Love (Slovak: Ja milujem, ty miluješ) directed by Dušan Hanák, is released. Hanák won the Silver Bear for Best Director at the 39th Berlin International Film Festival for the film.

=== Music ===
- The Pražák Quartet tours of the United States between 19 January and 19 March.
- Jiří Bělohlávek leaves his role as principal conductor of the Prague Symphony Orchestra.

== Births ==
- 9 November – Jiří Kopal, municipal politician known for his work for veterans.

== Deaths ==
- 2 February – Ondrej Nepela, winner of the singles gold medal in figure skating at the 1972 Winter Olympics (born 1959).
- 21 March – Jarmila Jeřábková, dancer, choreographer and teacher (born 1912).
- 21 December – Ján Cikker, composer (born 1911).
