= List of years in Czechoslovakia =

This is a list of years in Czechoslovakia. See also the History of Czechoslovakia. For only articles about years in Czechoslovakia that have been written, see Category:Years in Czechoslovakia.

== First Czechoslovak Republic ==
1910s
1918
1919

1920s
1920
1921
1922
1923
1924
1925
1926
1927
1928
1929

1930s
1930
1931
1932
1933
1934
1935
1936
1937
1938

== Second Czechoslovak Republic ==
1930s
1938
1939

== Third Czechoslovak Republic ==
1940s
1945
1946
1947
1948

== Czechoslovak Socialist Republic ==
1940s
1948
1949

1950s
1950
1951
1952
1953
1954
1955
1956
1957
1958
1959

1960s
1960
1961
1962
1963
1964
1965
1966
1967
1968
1969

1970s
1970
1971
1972
1973
1974
1975
1976
1977
1978
1979

1980s
1980
1981
1982
1983
1984
1985
1986
1987
1988
1989
