= Petr Kumandžas =

Czech musician (born 1961)

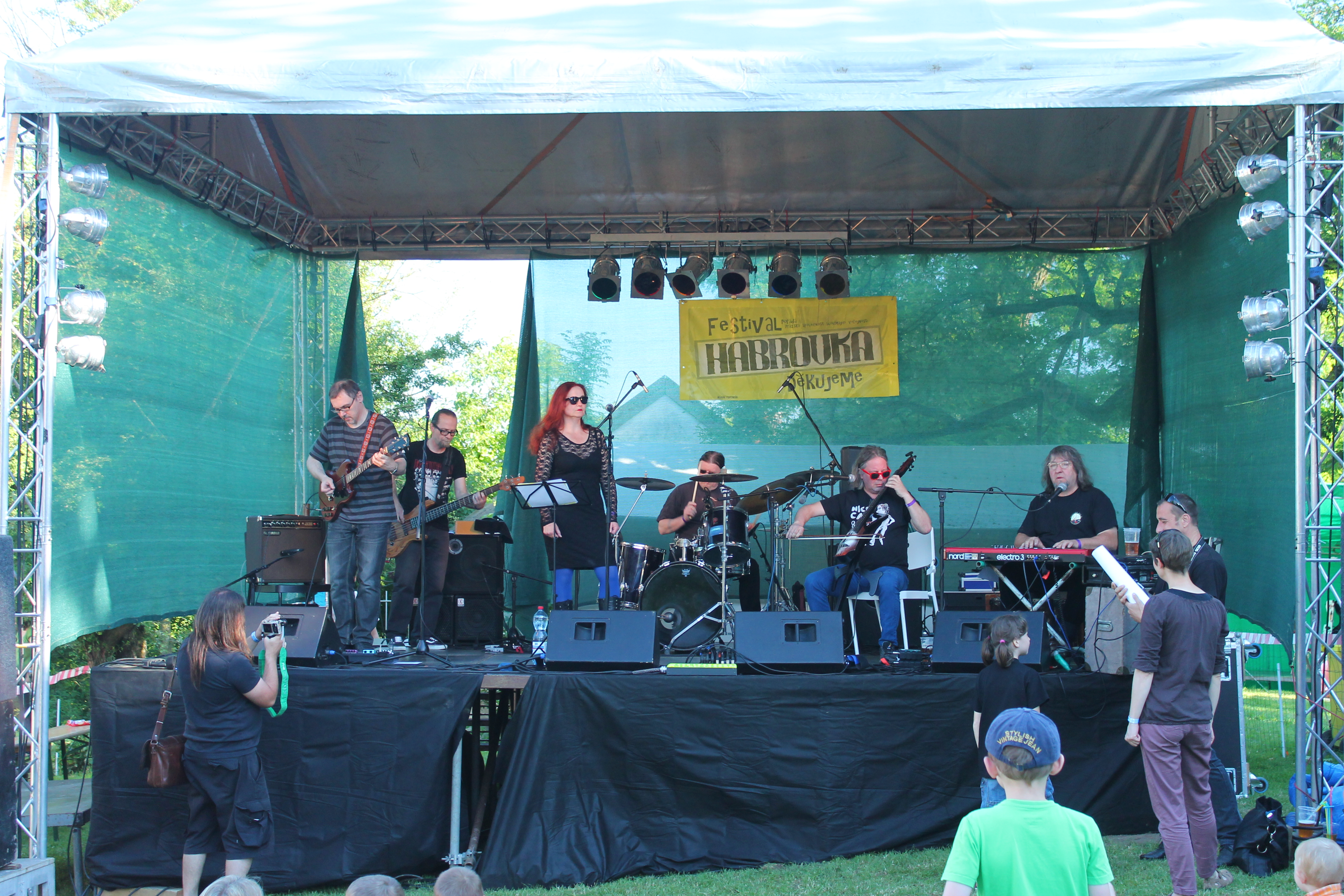
- Petr Kumandžas with Půlnoc playing bass guitar (second from left)

Background information
- Also known as: Komanč; Jolly Joker
- Born: 27 June 1961 (age 65); Prague, Czechoslovakia
- Occupation: Musician
- Instruments: Bass guitar; Drums (formerly)
- Years active: 1980s–present
- Member of: Umělá hmota; Svatopluk; Icebreaker
- Formerly of: Půlnoc; Jižní pól; Babalet; Egypt

Petr Kumandžas, also known as Komanč and Jolly Joker (born 27 June 1961) is a Czech bass guitarist and former drummer.

Early in his career, he was a member of Mikoláš Chadima's MCH Band, playing on their 1983 album Jsme zdrávi a daří se nám dobře (We Are Well And We Feel Fine), and also played with Jižní pól. In 1985, he joined Babalet. After leaving the band in 1987, he formed his own band Egypt, playing bass guitar and singing. Egypt released their eponymous debut album in 1991. The band transformed into Jolly Joker and the Plastic Beatles of the Universe in 1991, releasing the album Heavy, Funky, Boxing N' Roll in 1993. Their name was later shortened to Jolly Joker & P.B.U. In 2014–2016, he played with Tewahedo MoM with Michal Šeps. He joined Umělá hmota in 2022. He is also playing with his own project Icebreaker and with the band Svatopluk, playing the songs of Svatopluk Karásek. He also played with ArchAnděl MichAel.

In 1989, he joined Půlnoc for a few years, playing drums. The band was reformed in 2011 with Kumandžas on bass. They played their farewell tour in 2022.
