= Nová Ves (Český Krumlov District) =

- Municipality
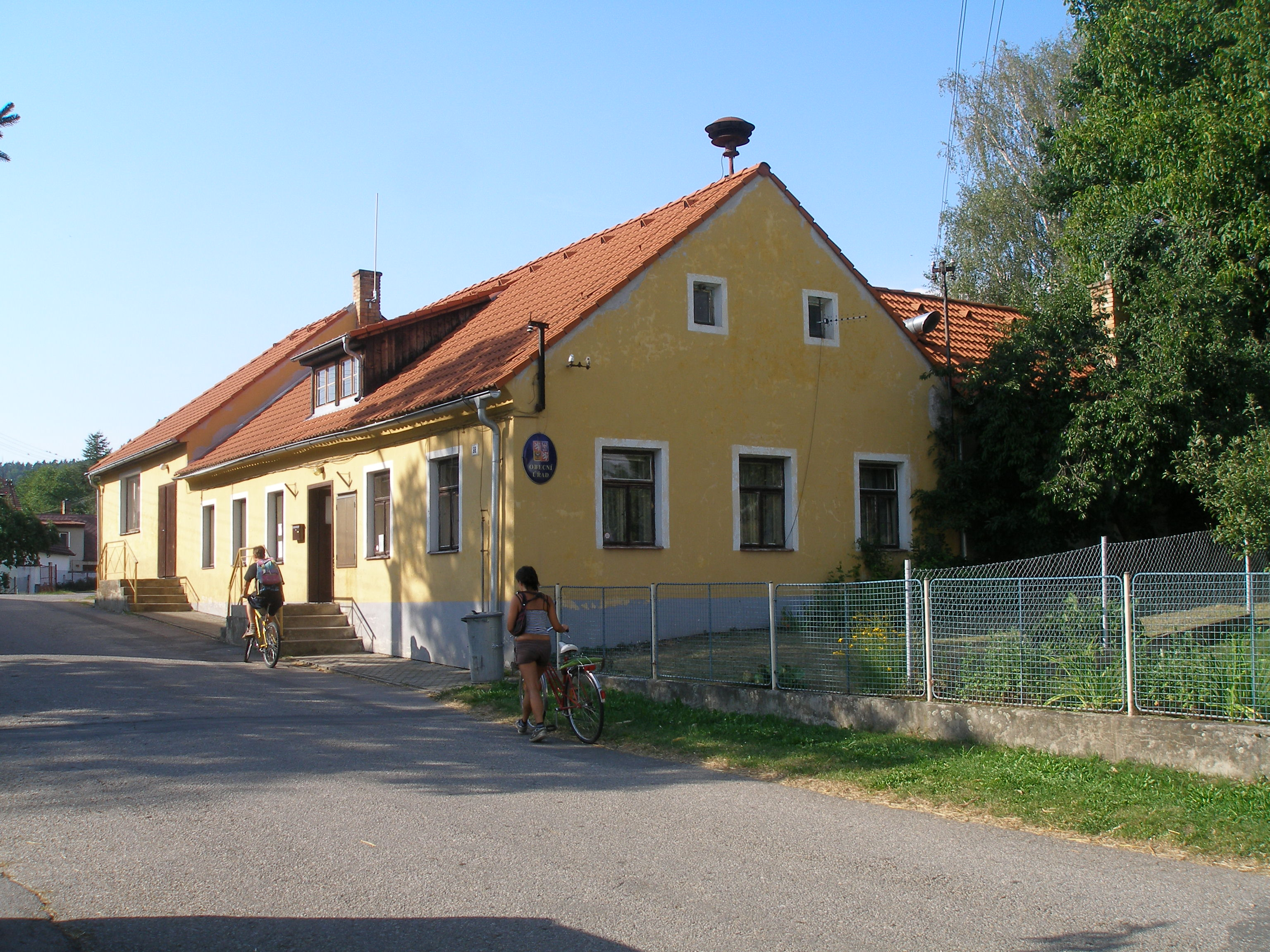
- Municipal office

- Flag Coat of arms

- Location in the Czech Republic
- Coordinates: 48°56′54″N 14°14′50″E
- Country: Czech Republic
- Region: South Bohemian Region
- District: Český Krumlov
- First mentioned: 1379

Area
  - Total: 9.94 km^{2} (3.84 sq mi)
- Elevation: 558 m (1,831 ft)

Population (2026-01-01)
  - Total: 415
  - Density: 41.8/km^{2} (108/sq mi)
- Time zone: UTC+1 (CET)
  - Summer (DST): UTC+2 (CEST)
- Postal code: 382 06
- Website: www.novaves-ck.cz

Nová Ves (German: Neudorf bei Bernau) is a municipality and village in Český Krumlov District in the South Bohemian Region of the Czech Republic. It has about 400 inhabitants.

Nová Ves lies approximately 17 kilometres (11 mi) north of Český Krumlov, 17 km (11 mi) west of České Budějovice, and 128 km (80 mi) south of Prague.

== Administrative division ==
Nová Ves consists of two municipal parts (in brackets population according to the 2021 census):

- Nová Ves (335)
- České Chalupy (57)

== History ==
The first written mention of Nová Ves is from 1379. From 1938 to 1945, it was annexed to Nazi Germany and administered as a part of the Reichsgau Oberdonau.

== Demographics ==
Historical population
| Year | Pop. | ±% |
|---|---|---|
| 1869 | 685 | — |
| 1880 | 656 | −4.2% |
| 1890 | 634 | −3.4% |
| 1900 | 683 | +7.7% |
| 1910 | 686 | +0.4% |
| 1921 | 662 | −3.5% |
| 1930 | 636 | −3.9% |
| 1950 | 416 | −34.6% |
| 1961 | 467 | +12.3% |
| 1970 | 440 | −5.8% |
| 1980 | 440 | +0.0% |
| 1991 | 388 | −11.8% |
| 2001 | 392 | +1.0% |
| 2011 | 406 | +3.6% |
| 2021 | 392 | −3.4% |
Source: Censuses

== Notable people ==
- Miloš Jakeš (1922–2020), communist politician
