= Karel Urbánek =

Final First Secretary of the Communist Party of Czechoslovakia in 1989

First Secretary of the Communist Party of Czechoslovakia
- In office 24 November 1989 – 20 December 1989
- Preceded by: Miloš Jakeš
- Succeeded by: Ladislav Adamec (as Party Chairman)

Personal details
- Born: 22 March 1941 (age 85) Bojkovice, Protectorate of Bohemia and Moravia (present-day Czech Republic)
- Party: Communist Party of Bohemia and Moravia (since 1990)
- Other political affiliations: Communist Party of Czechoslovakia (until 1990)
- Occupation: Politician
- De facto ruler of the ČSSR: ← Jakeš; (Last in role) →

Karel Urbánek (born 22 March 1941) is a retired Czech politician, and the last communist leader of the Czechoslovak Socialist Republic. He, Egon Krenz from East Germany and Gombojavyn Ochirbat from Mongolia are the last former General Secretaries from the Eastern Bloc still alive.

== Career ==
Urbánek was born on 22 March 1941 in Bojkovice, Moravia.

A former Bojkovice railway station manager, he replaced Miloš Jakeš as Secretary General of the Communist Party of Czechoslovakia after a swift election on 24 November 1989 in the wake of the Velvet Revolution. Four days later, he gave his approval to a constitutional amendment which stripped the Communist Party of its monopoly of power, which proved to be the only major decision of his tenure. However, Communist rule had effectively ended with Jakeš' resignation. He remained as party leader until 20 December 1989, when he was succeeded by Ladislav Adamec.
