= Půlnoc =

Czech rock band

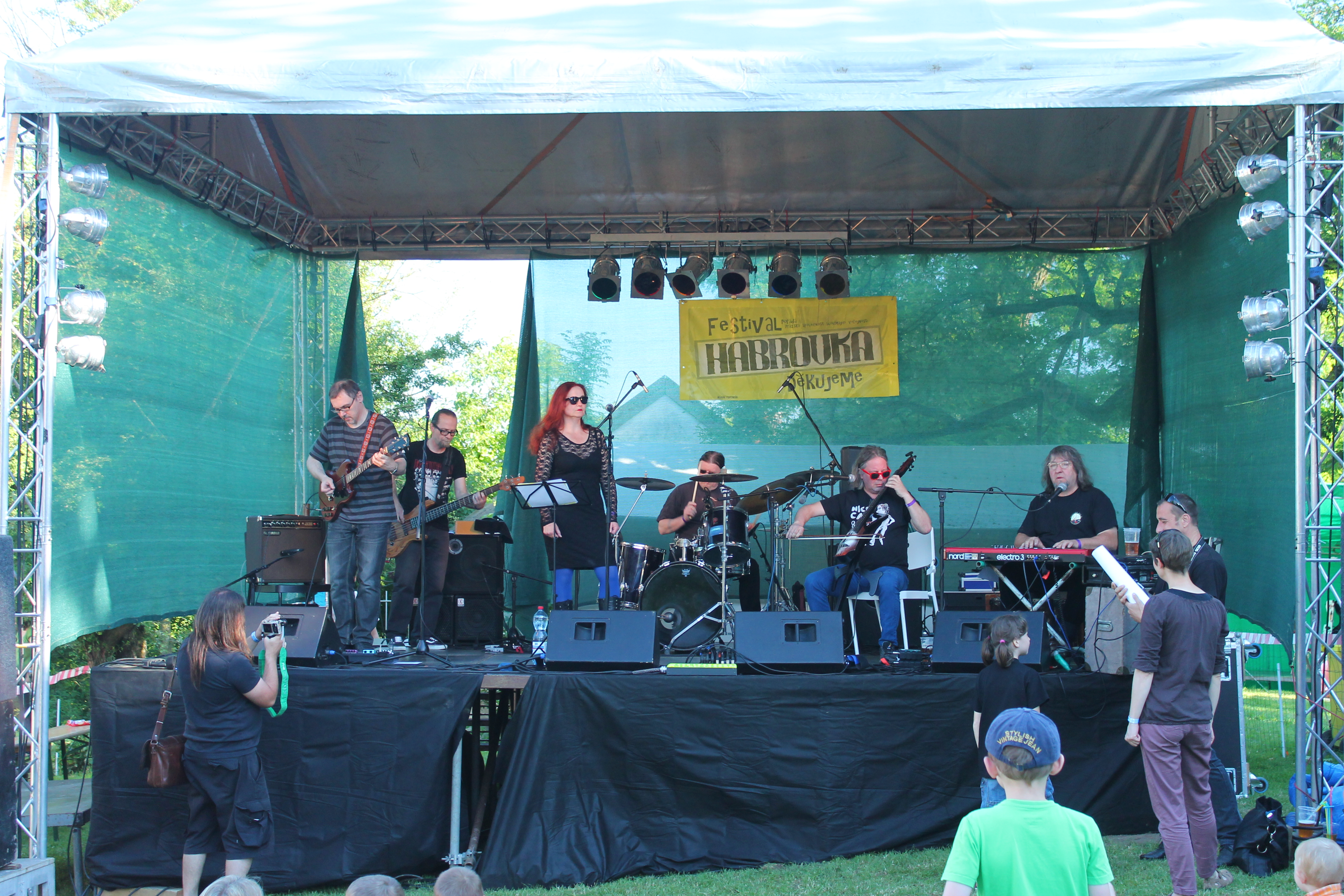
- Půlnoc performing in 2014

Background information
- Origin: Prague, Czechoslovakia
- Genres: Rock
- Years active: 1988–1993, 2011–2022
- Labels: Globus International; Arista
- Spinoff of: The Plastic People of the Universe
- Past members: Milan Hlavsa; Josef Janíček; Petr Kumandžas; Tomáš Schilla; Karel Jančák; Michaela Němcová; Jiří Křivka; Jiří Michálek; Jiří Kabeš; Tadeáš Věrčák

Půlnoc was a Czech rock band established in 1988 by three members of the Plastic People of the Universe, after the latter band was denied permission to travel and banned from performing openly by the Czechoslovak government, and thus broke up. It consisted of Milan Hlavsa (bass), Josef Janíček (keyboards), and Jiří Kabeš (violin and guitar), as well as Hlavsa's sister-in-law, Michaela Němcová (vocals), Tomáš Schilla (cello), Karel Jančák (guitar), and Petr Kumandžas (drums). In 1989, Půlnoc toured the United States and gained favorable attention from journalists there. Robert Christgau named a bootleg of a concert the band played in New York City the best album of 1989. Steve Hochman, writing for the Los Angeles Times, described the tour as "remarkable at least as much musically as it was culturally", adding that when the band played a show in San Francisco, "Plastic People fans and the uninitiated curious alike were floored by the combination of heavy metal, art-rock, operatic vocals and locomotive-worthy propulsion".

Půlnoc issued the albums Půlnoc (1990) and City of Hysteria (1991), before splitting up in 1993. Milan Hlavsa died in 2001, and in 2011, the band reunited (without Kabeš) to commemorate one decade since his death. This led to the recording and release of the live album Kniha noci 1988–1989 the same year. In 2012, Půlnoc toured briefly with the Plastic People of the Universe, which had resumed activity in 1997. They continued to perform intermittently during the following decade, including at the 2014 Habrovka festival. Karel Jančák died in 2012. In April and May 2022, they embarked on an eight-date final tour, culminating in Jihlava.

== Band members ==
- Milan Hlavsa – bass
- Josef Janíček – keyboards
- Petr Kumandžas – drums
- Tomáš Schilla – cello
- Karel Jančák – guitar
- Michaela Němcová – vocals
- Jiří Křivka – guitar
- Jiří Michálek – drums
- Jiří Kabeš – violin, guitar
- Tadeáš Věrčák – guitar

== Discography ==
- Půlnoc (1990)
- City of Hysteria (1991)
- Live in New York (1996)
- Kniha noci 1988–1989 (live, 2011)
- Údolí ohně – Reunion Tour 2012 (live, 2013)
