= Candle demonstration in Bratislava =

1988 anti-government mass protests in Bratislava, Czechoslovakia (now Slovakia)

The Candle demonstration (Slovak: Sviečková manifestácia) on 25 March 1988 in Bratislava, the capital of Slovakia, was the first mass demonstration since 1969 against the communist regime in Czechoslovakia.

The demonstration was organized by Roman Catholic dissent groups asking for religious freedom in Czechoslovakia. The peaceful candle demonstration of five thousand believers was suppressed by the police.

The demonstration was planned by Marián Šťastný, executive vice-president of the Slovak World Congress and his associate Paul Arnold of Switzerland. They were in touch with the Čarnogurský family of Bratislava and passed on the plans for the demonstration via Šťastný's mother-in-law, who was on a visit to Switzerland.

Catholic activist František Mikloško initiated a request for a permit to demonstrate, but his proposal was rejected by the authorities. Information about the event was propagated through Vatican Radio and by Radio Free Europe and Voice of America.

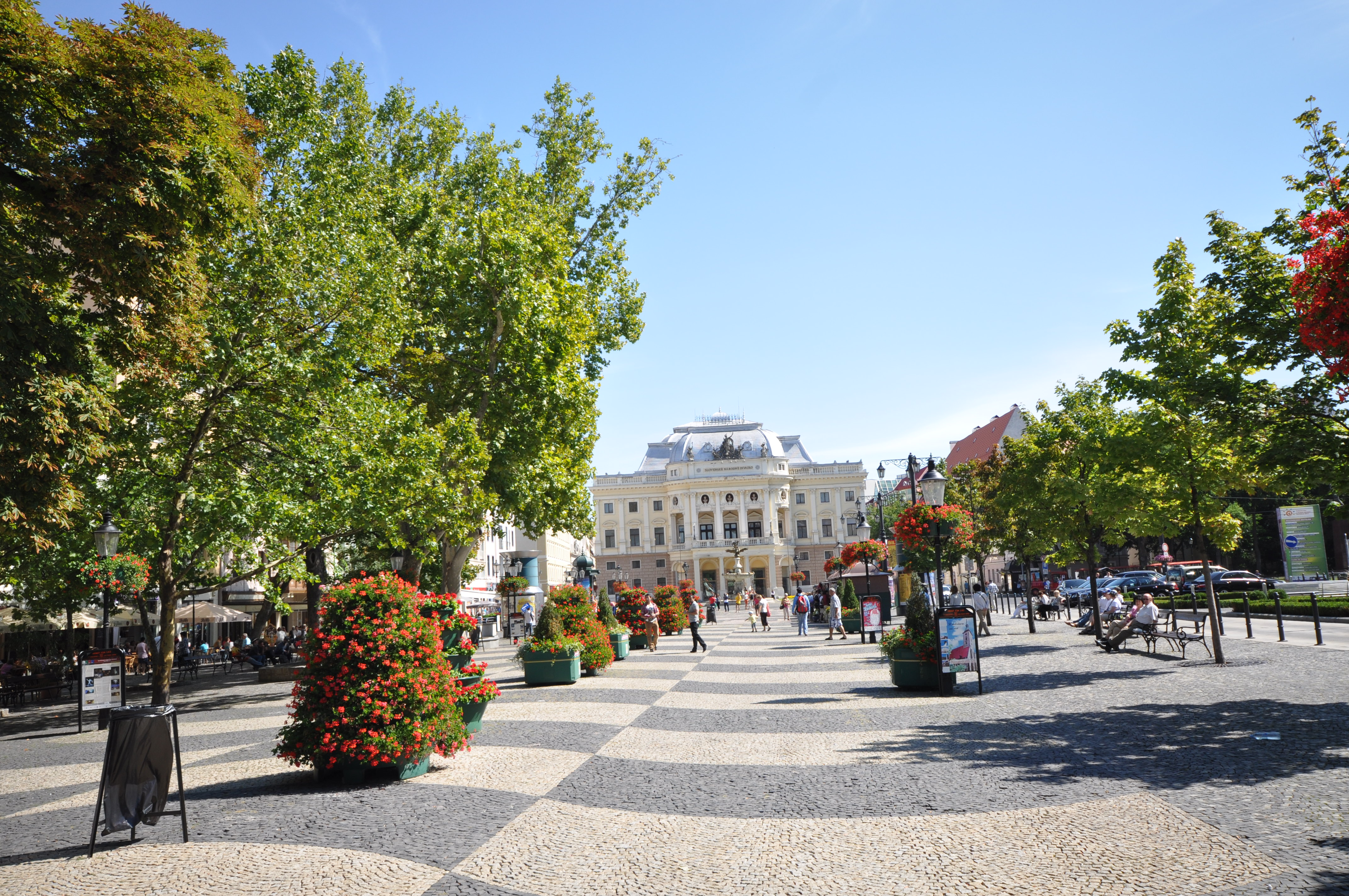
Hviezdoslav Square

The demonstration was the first important step towards destroying the communist regime in Czechoslovakia, a process which culminated in the Velvet Revolution. Five thousand Slovaks protested at Hviezdoslav Square with candles in their hands, and other six thousands in adjacent streets, while the main entrance to the square was blocked by the secret police. Police first used water cannons against protesters while they ran their sirens and yelled at protesters to get away from the square, then began attacking the protesters with batons and sticks.

Leading communist officials (e.g. the Slovak prime minister, minister of the interior, minister of culture) were observing the whole "operation" from inside the Carlton Hotel on Hviezdoslav square. The minister of culture disagreed with the police operation and as a result he decided to resign in autumn 1988.

25 March has become Struggle for Human Rights Day in Slovakia, commemorating the candle demonstration.
