= Miloš Jakeš =

Leader of Czechoslovakia from 1987 to 1989

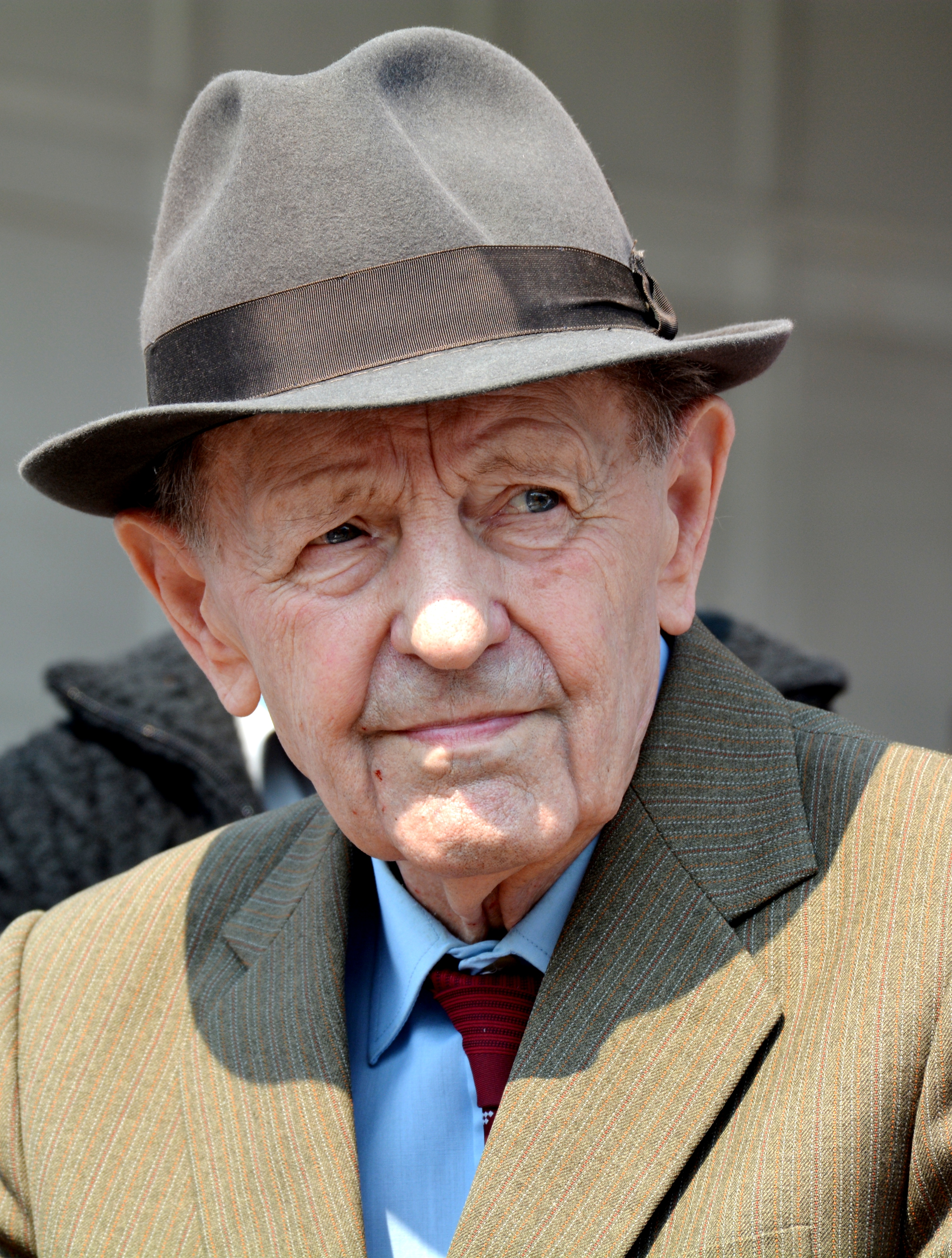
- Miloš Jakeš in Prague on 1 May 2014

First Secretary of the Communist Party of Czechoslovakia
- In office 17 December 1987 – 24 November 1989
- Preceded by: Gustáv Husák
- Succeeded by: Karel Urbánek

Personal details
- Born: 12 August 1922 České Chalupy, Czechoslovakia (now Czech Republic)
- Died: 10 July 2020 (aged 97) Prague, Czech Republic
- Party: Communist Party of Czechoslovakia
- Spouse: Květena Jakešová (m. 1943; died 2013)
- De facto ruler of the ČSSR: ← Husák; Urbánek →

Miloš Jakeš (12 August 1922 – 9 July or 10 July 2020) was a Czech communist politician. He was General Secretary of the Communist Party of Czechoslovakia from 1987 until 1989.

He resigned from his position in late November 1989, amid the Velvet Revolution.

== Early life ==
Jakeš was born in České Chalupy, now part of Nová Ves near České Budějovice. He grew up in a poor village family in the Bohemian Forest borderlands before working in Bata Shoes factory in Zlín between 1937 and 1950. He joined the Communist Party of Czechoslovakia soon after World War II, triggering his steady rise within the party ranks. In 1955 he began his studies at Moscow's Party's Higher College and, after obtaining his degree in 1958, his career continued without interruption, undisturbed even during the 1968 Prague Spring period. After the Soviet invasion, Jakeš became one of the main initiators of the political purges carried out in the name of "normalization".

== Party leader ==
Following the ouster of Gustáv Husák at a dramatic party meeting in December 1987, Jakeš was nominated for the position of General Secretary by the competing factions within the Communist Party of Czechoslovakia. Following his rise to power, Jakeš began to promote himself as a supporter of glasnost and perestroika. Yet, despite the Communist Party's attempt to appease the public's demands for reform, Jakeš remained staunchly opposed to any dialogue with the growing opposition movement in the country. Even when the Velvet Revolution broke out, Jakeš refused to consider any serious talks with the opposition. Events soon overtook him, and on 24 November he resigned along with the party's entire Presidium. The Communists officially abandoned power four days later.

As General Secretary Jakeš used the first name Miloš. During the trial it was revealed that his actual name is Milouš.

== Speech in Červený Hrádek ==
Jakeš gained unwanted infamy through his famous speech addressed to local party workers in Červený Hrádek close to Plzeň. When speaking about the necessity of Gorbachev-inspired "perestroika", he presented himself and the party as a lonely pole plank being allegedly left alone to overcome the hardships. Jakeš also mistook the word broiler (type of chicken) for boiler and spoke in an embarrassingly familiar way about some Czech pop music singers when pointing to their allegedly super-high incomes ("None of us earns so much!"). His speech had been recorded by a journalist from Czech Television who managed to secretly make a copy of the tape. The recording was frequently copied among the people in summer 1989 and afterwards.

== Personal life and death ==
Jakeš lived in Prague as an ordinary pensioner and was a frequent guest at Communist rallies after the revolution. He wrote a book entitled Dva roky generálním tajemníkem (Two years as the General Secretary), in which he compared the forty-year-long Communist rule of Czechoslovakia to the Hussite period in the nation's history. Jakeš died between 9 July 2020 and the following day at the age of 97.

Party political offices
Preceded by Gustáv Husák	First Secretary of the Communist Party of Czechoslovakia; 17 December 1987 – 24 November 1989	Succeeded by Karel Urbánek
