= Lubomír Štrougal =

Czech politician (1924–2023)

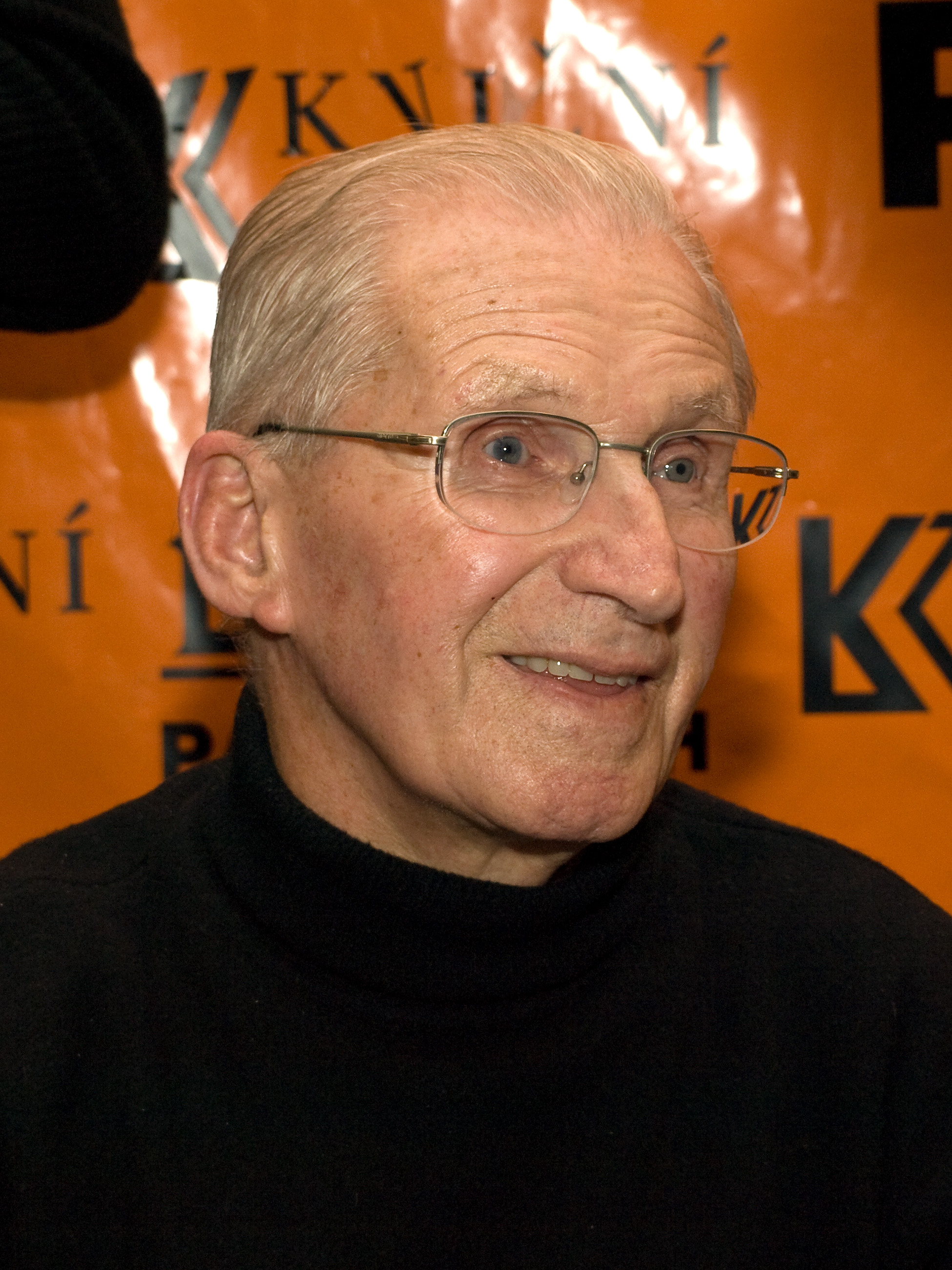
- Štrougal in 2012

Prime Minister of Czechoslovakia
- In office 28 January 1970 – 12 October 1988
- President: Ludvík Svoboda; Gustáv Husák
- Preceded by: Oldřich Černík
- Succeeded by: Ladislav Adamec

Minister of the Interior
- In office 23 June 1961 – 23 April 1965
- Prime Minister: Viliam Široký; Jozef Lenárt
- Preceded by: Rudolf Barák
- Succeeded by: Josef Kudma

Minister of Agriculture of Czechoslovakia
- In office 6 March 1959 – 23 June 1961
- Prime Minister: Viliam Široký
- Preceded by: Michal Bakuľa
- Succeeded by: Vratislav Krutina

Personal details
- Born: 19 October 1924 Veselí nad Lužnicí, Czechoslovakia
- Died: 6 February 2023 (aged 98)
- Party: Communist Party of Czechoslovakia
- Spouse: Věra Štrougalová (m. 1952; div. 1992)
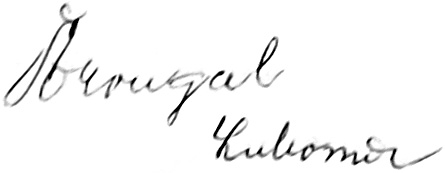
- Signature

Lubomír Štrougal (19 October 1924 – 6 February 2023) was a Czech politician who was the prime minister of Czechoslovakia from 1970 to 1988.

== Biography ==
Štrougal was born in Veselí nad Lužnicí on 19 October 1924. His father, a communist, died in a concentration camp during World War II. Štrougal studied law at Charles University in Prague.

Štrougal joined the Communist Party of Czechoslovakia, and in the late 1950s became a member of its Central Committee. Štrougal was agriculture minister between 1959 and 1961, and then interior minister until 1965. In 1968, he became deputy prime minister under Oldřich Černík. At first he rejected the 1968 occupation of Czechoslovakia by Warsaw Pact forces, but later became a prominent figure in Gustáv Husák's regime.

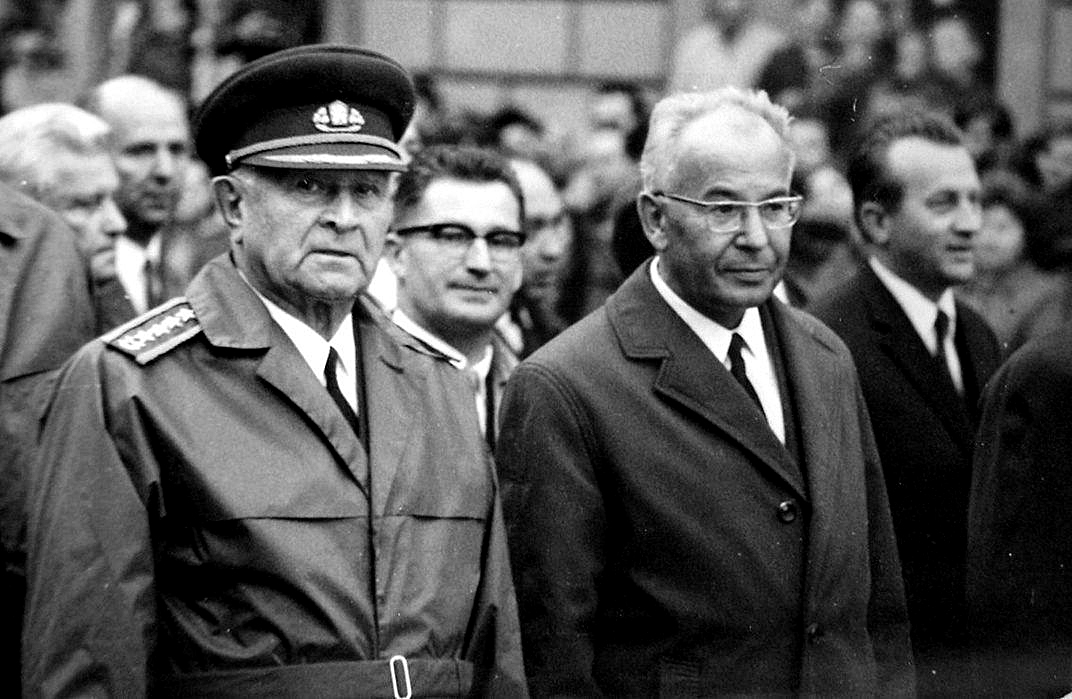
Štrougal standing behind Ludvík Svoboda and Gustáv Husák visiting the Slovak National Uprising memorial in Banská Bystrica in 1969

Štrougal became the prime minister of Czechoslovakia on 28 January 1970. In the 1980s, he supported perestroika, the reform process initiated by Soviet President Mikhail Gorbachev. He resigned as prime minister on 12 October 1988 due to conflicts with Communist Party chairman Miloš Jakeš, a hard-liner. Following the Velvet Revolution of 1989, Štrougal decided to retire from politics; he was ultimately expelled from the party in February 1990.

The Office for the Documentation and the Investigation of the Crimes of Communism Police of the Czech Republic (UDV) alleged that, in 1965, Štrougal had prevented investigation of crimes conducted by the communist State Security in the late 1940s. Štrougal was acquitted of the charge in July 2002. In 2022, Štrougal was again put on trial, along with former Interior Minister Vratislav Vajnar, for ordering the killing of citizens trying to cross the border into the west. However, experts from the psychiatric hospital where he was being treated said he was suffering from mild dementia and could not comprehend the court proceedings. Regardless, Štrougal claimed that the killings were not his responsibility. Štrougal died on 6 February 2023, at the age of 98.

Political offices
Preceded by Oldřich Černík	Prime Minister of Czechoslovakia; 1970–1988	Succeeded by Ladislav Adamec
