= History of Czechoslovakia =

With the collapse of Austria-Hungary at the end of World War I, the independent country of Czechoslovakia (Czech, Slovak: Československo) was formed as a result of the critical initiative of the first Czechoslovak president Thomas Masaryk and the intervention of U.S. President Woodrow Wilson, among others.

The Czechs and Slovaks were not at the same level of economic and technological development, but the freedom and opportunity found in an independent Czechoslovakia enabled them to make strides toward overcoming these inequalities.

== Political history ==
=== Historical background to 1918 ===
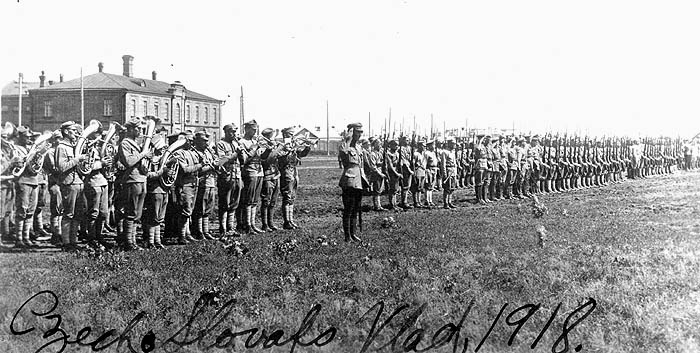
Czechoslovak Legions in Vladivostok (1918)

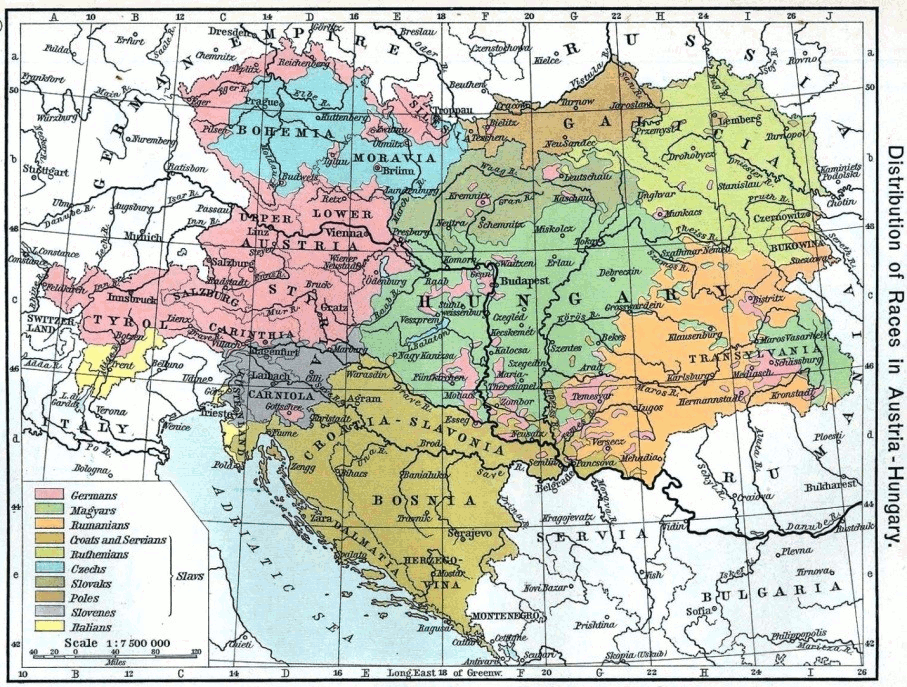
Distribution of ethnicities in the Austro-Hungarian Empire (Czechs: blue, Slovaks: dark green)

Although the Czechs and Slovaks speak languages that are very similar, the political and social situation of the Czech and Slovak peoples was very different at the end of the 19th century. The reason was the differing attitude and position of their overlords – the Austrians in Bohemia and Moravia, and the Hungarians in Slovakia – within Austria-Hungary. Bohemia was the most industrialized part of Austria and Slovakia was the most industrialized part of Hungary – however at very different levels of development.

Around the start of the 20th century, the idea of a "Czecho-Slovak" entity began to be advocated by some Czech and Slovak leaders after contacts between Czech and Slovak intellectuals intensified in the 1890s. Despite cultural differences, the Slovaks shared similar aspirations with the Czechs for independence from the Habsburg state. In the early stages of World War I, some Western, especially British, writers, such as Charles Ernest Fayle and Robert Seton-Watson, proposed creating and setting up an independent Czechoslovak state in the event of a decisive victory for the Entente side in World War I when they wrote books such as Fayle's The Great Settlement (1915) and Seton-Watson's The War and Democracy (1915).

In 1917, during World War I, Tomáš Masaryk created the Czechoslovak National Council together with Edvard Beneš and Milan Štefánik (a Slovak astronomer and war hero). Masaryk in the United States (and in United Kingdom and Russia too), Štefánik in France, and Beneš in France and Britain, worked tirelessly to secure Allied recognition. About 1.4 million Czech soldiers fought in World War I, 150,000 of which died.

More than 90,000 Czech and Slovak volunteers formed the Czechoslovak Legions in Russia, France and Italy, where they fought against the Central Powers and later with White Russian forces against Bolshevik troops. At times they controlled much of the Trans-Siberian railway, and they were indirectly involved in the shooting of the Russian Tsar and his family in 1918. Their goal was to win the support of the Allies for the independence of Czechoslovakia. They succeeded on all counts. When secret talks between the Allies and Austrian Emperor Charles I (r. 1916–1918) collapsed, the Allies recognized, in the summer of 1918, the Czechoslovak National Council would be the kernel of the future Czechoslovak government.

=== First Republic (1918–1938) ===
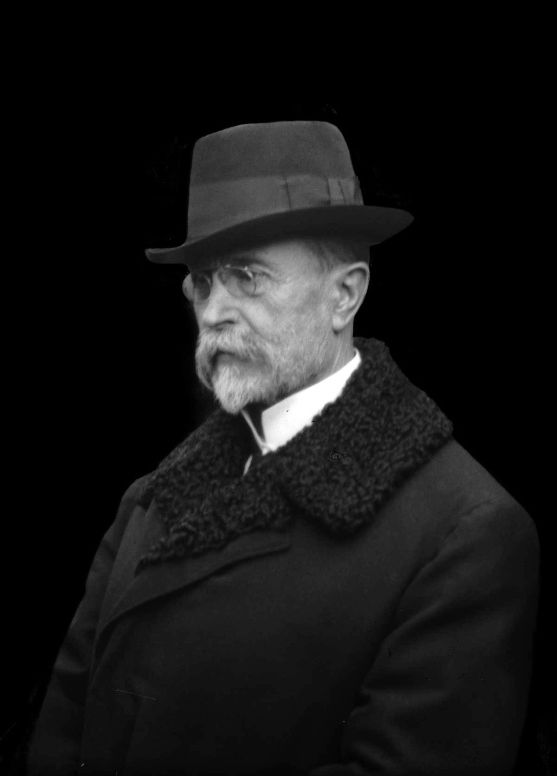
Tomáš Garrigue Masaryk, the first president of Czechoslovakia.

The Provisional Czechoslovak Government, chaired by Tomáš Garrigue Masaryk, proclaimed the Independence of the Czechoslovak Nation in the Washington Declaration on 18 October 1918. Czechoslovakia was legally created by Law on the Creation of Independent Czechoslovak State (No. 11/1918 Coll.) in Prague on 28 October 1918 in Smetana Hall of the Municipal House, a physical setting strongly associated with nationalist feeling. The Slovaks officially joined the state two days later in the town of Martin. The formation of the state faced immediate opposition from the large German-speaking population in the border regions (Sudetenland/Deutschböhmen), who – appealing to Wilson's Fourteen Points on self-determination – sought to join the new Republic of German-Austria rather than accept inclusion in Czechoslovakia. These attempts ultimately failed due to military occupation by Czechoslovak forces in late 1918/early 1919 and the Allies' decision at the Paris Peace Conference to uphold the historic borders of the Bohemian Crown lands. A temporary constitution was adopted, and Tomáš Masaryk was declared president on 14 November. The Treaty of St. Germain, signed in September 1919, formally recognized the new republic. Carpathian Ruthenia was added later by the Treaty of Trianon in June 1920. There were also various border conflicts between Poland and Czechoslovakia due to the annexation of the Trans-Olza region.

The new state was constituted as the nation-state of the Czech and Slovak peoples and conceived as a representative democracy.. Its 1920 constitution identified the "Czechoslovak nation" as the creator and principal constituent of the Czechoslovak state, established Czech and Slovak as the only official languages, and – by this construction – placed the German population (the second-largest ethnic group at 22.95% in 1921) in a structurally disadvantaged position. Without merging Czechs and Slovaks statistically into one "Czechoslovak nation", the demographic majority vis-à-vis the Germans would have appeared rather weak.

The decision to build the state as the nation-state of the Czech and Slovak peoples inevitably brought ethnic tensions. Chief among them was the intense and confrontational agitation coming from Germans and Hungarians – in particular the German population's push for autonomy or even secession, fueled by opposition to the territorial settlement and by their systematic disadvantages within the new state. Alongside this stood the distinct historical experiences of Czechs and Slovaks, together with their sharply differing religious, cultural, and social traditions – nowhere more evident than in the gulf between the largely secular Czechs and the deeply Catholic Slovaks. The most fundamental lines of division however ran between Czechs and Germans, centred above all on language, national allegiance, and long-standing ethnic rivalry.

Nevertheless, the new republic saw the passage of a number of progressive reforms in areas such as housing, social security, and workers' rights. In 1929, the gross domestic product increased by 52% and industrial production by 41% as compared to 1913. In 1938, Czechoslovakia held 10th place in the world for industrial production.

The operation of the new Czechoslovak government was distinguished by its political stability. Largely responsible for this were the well-organized political parties that emerged as the real centers of power. After 1933, Czechoslovakia remained the only democracy in central and eastern Europe.

=== Second Republic (1938–1939) ===
The partition and occupation of Czechoslovakia

Although Czechoslovakia was the only central European country to remain a parliamentary democracy during the entire period 1918 to 1938, it faced problems with ethnic minorities such as Hungarians, Poles and Sudeten Germans, which made up the largest part of the country's German minority. The Germans constituted 3 to 3.5 million out of 14 million of the interwar population of Czechoslovakia and were largely concentrated in the Bohemian and Moravian border regions known as the Sudetenland.

The rise of Adolf Hitler and Nazi Germany in 1933, the German annexation (Anschluss) of Austria in 1938, the resulting revival of revisionism in Hungary, the agitation for autonomy in Slovakia and the appeasement policy of the Western powers of France and the United Kingdom left Czechoslovakia without effective allies.

After the acquisition of Austria, Czechoslovakia became Hitler's next target. The German nationalist minority in Czechoslovakia, led by Konrad Henlein and fervently backed by Hitler, demanded a union of the predominantly German districts of the country with Germany. On 17 September 1938 Hitler ordered the establishment of Sudetendeutsches Freikorps, a paramilitary organization that took over the structure of Ordnersgruppe, an organization of ethnic-Germans in Czechoslovakia that had been dissolved by the Czechoslovak authorities the previous day due to its implication in terrorist activities. The organization was sheltered, trained and equipped by German authorities and conducting cross border terrorist operations into Czechoslovak territory. Relying on the Convention for the Definition of Aggression, Czechoslovak president Edvard Beneš and the government-in-exile later regarded 17 September 1938 as the beginning of the undeclared German-Czechoslovak war. This understanding has been assumed also by the contemporary Czech Constitutional court.

Hitler extorted the cession of the Bohemian, Moravian and Czech Silesian borderlands via the Munich Agreement on 29 September 1938 signed by Germany, Italy, France, and Britain. The Czech population in the annexed lands was forcibly expelled.

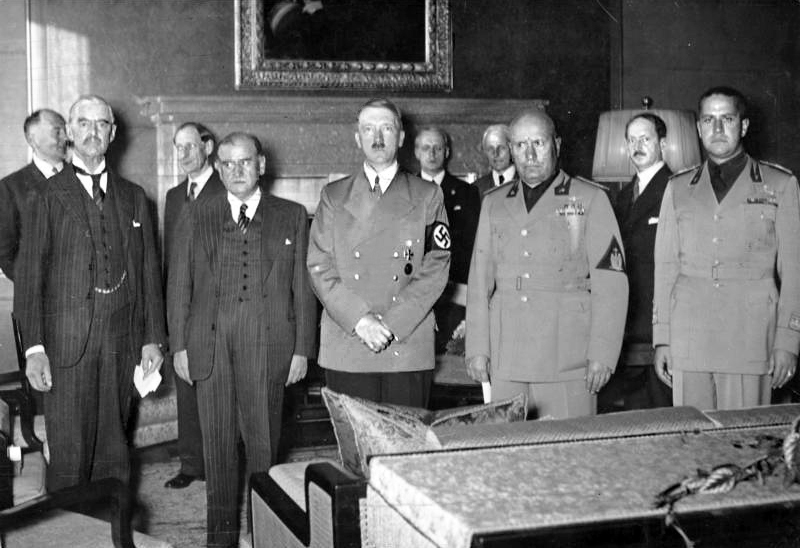
From left to right: Chamberlain, Daladier, Hitler, Mussolini, and Ciano pictured before signing the Munich Agreement in September 1938, which gave the Sudetenland to Germany.

Finding itself abandoned by the Western powers, the Czechoslovak government agreed to abide by the agreement. Beneš resigned as president on 5 October 1938, fled to London and was succeeded by Emil Hácha. In early November 1938, under the First Vienna Award, Czechoslovakia was forced to cede the mainly Hungarian-populated southern Slovakia (one third of Slovakia) to Hungary. After an ultimatum on 30 September (but without consulting with any other countries), Poland obtained the disputed the Trans-Olza region as a territorial cession shortly after the Munich Agreement, on 2 October. The ultimatum was only sent after Czech request.

The Czechs in the greatly weakened Czechoslovak Republic were forced to grant major concessions to the non-Czech residents in the country. The executive committee of the Slovak People's Party met at Žilina on 5 October 1938, and with the acquiescence of all Slovak parties except the Social Democrats formed an autonomous Slovak government under Jozef Tiso. Similarly, the two major factions in Subcarpathian Ruthenia, the Russophiles and Ukrainophiles, agreed on the establishment of an autonomous government that was constituted on 8 October 1938. In late November 1938, the truncated state, renamed Czecho-Slovakia (the so-called Second Republic), was reconstituted in three autonomous units: the Czech lands (i.e. Bohemia and Moravia), Slovakia, and Ruthenia.

On 14 March 1939, the Slovak State declared its independence under Jozef Tiso. Hitler forced Hácha to surrender what remained of Bohemia and Moravia to German control on 15 March 1939, establishing the German Protectorate of Bohemia and Moravia. On the same day, the Carpatho-Ukraine (Subcarpathian Ruthenia) declared its independence and was immediately occupied and annexed by Hungary. Finally, following the Slovak–Hungarian Little War, Slovakia ceded an eastern land strip to Hungary.

=== World War II ===
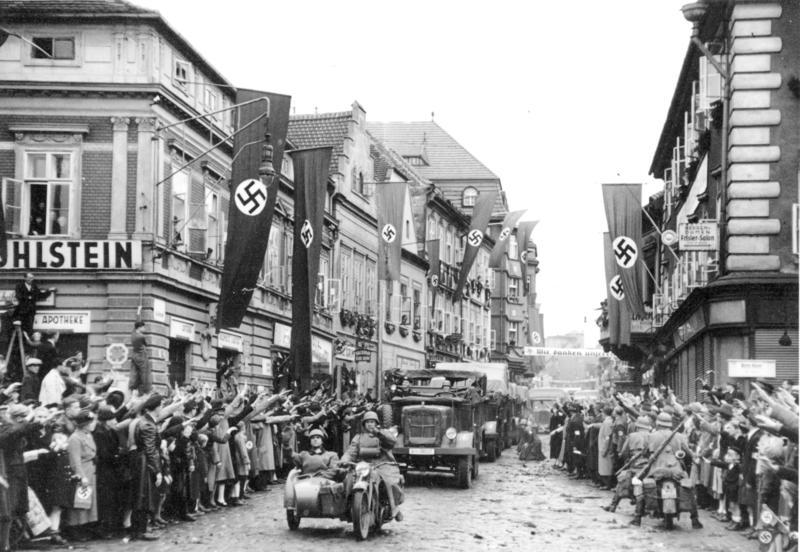
Sudeten Germans in Saaz (Žatec) greet the Wehrmacht with Nazi salutes.

Beneš and other Czechoslovak exiles in London organized a Czechoslovak Government-in-Exile and negotiated to obtain international recognition for the government and a renunciation of the Munich Agreement. The government was recognized by the government of the United Kingdom with the approval of Foreign Secretary Lord Halifax on 18 July 1940. In July and December 1941, the Soviet Union and United States also recognized the exiled government, respectively.

Czechoslovak military units fought alongside Allied forces. In December 1943, Beneš's government concluded a treaty with the Soviet Union. Beneš worked to bring Czechoslovak communist exiles in Britain into active cooperation with his government, offering far-reaching concessions, including nationalization of heavy industry and the creation of local people's committees at the war's end (which indeed occurred). In March 1945, he gave key cabinet positions to Czechoslovak communist exiles in Moscow.

The assassination of Reichsprotector Reinhard Heydrich in 1942 by a group of British-trained Czech and Slovak commandos led by Jan Kubiš and Jozef Gabčík led to reprisals, including the annihilation of the village of Lidice. All adult male inhabitants were executed, while females and children were transported to concentration camps. A similar fate met the village of Ležáky and later, at the end of war, Javoříčko.

On 8 May 1944, Edvard Beneš signed an agreement with Soviet leaders stipulating that former Czechoslovak territory liberated by Soviet armies would be placed under Czechoslovak civilian control.

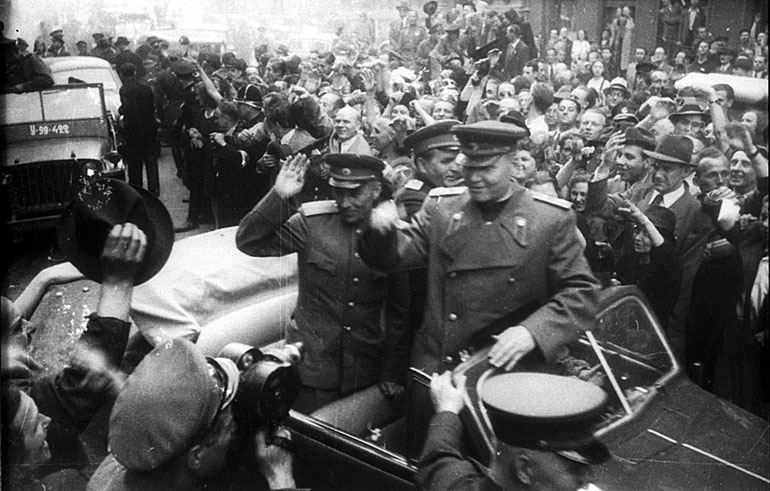
Soviet Marshall Konev at the liberation of Prague by the Red Army in May 1945.

From 21 September 1944, Czechoslovakia was liberated by the Soviet troops of the Red Army and the Romanian Army, supported by Czech and Slovak resistance, from the east to the west; only southwestern Bohemia was liberated by other Allied troops (i.e., the United States Army) from the west. In May 1945, American forces liberated the city of Plzeň. A civilian uprising against the Nazi garrison took place in Prague in May 1945. The resistance was assisted by the heavily armed Russian Liberation Army, i.e., Gen. Vlasov's army, a force composed of Soviet POWs organised by the Germans who now turned against them.

The main brutality suffered in the lands of the pre-war Czechoslovakia came as an immediate result of the German occupation in the Protectorate, the widespread persecution of Jews, and, after the Slovak National uprising in August 1944, repression in Slovakia. In spite of the oppressiveness of the government of the German Protectorate, Czechoslovakia did not suffer the degree of population loss that was witnessed during World War II in countries such as Poland and the Soviet Union, and it avoided systematic destruction of its infrastructure. Bratislava was taken from the Germans on 4 April 1945, and Prague on 9 May 1945 by Soviet troops. Both Soviet and Allied troops were withdrawn in the same year.

A treaty ceding Transcarpathia to the Soviet Union was signed in June 1945 between Czechoslovakia and the Soviet Union, following an apparently rigged Soviet-run referendum in the territory. The Potsdam Agreement provided for the expulsion of Sudeten Germans to Germany under the supervision of the Allied Control Council. Decisions regarding the Hungarian minority reverted to the Czechoslovak government. In February 1946, the Hungarian government agreed that Czechoslovakia could expatriate as many Hungarians as there were Slovaks in Hungary wishing to return to Czechoslovakia.

=== Third Republic (1945–1948) and the Communist takeover (1948) ===
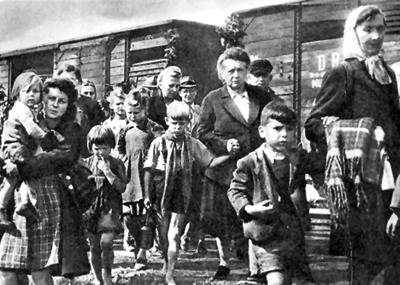
Germans being deported from Czechoslovakia in the aftermath of WW2

The Third Republic came into being in April 1945. Its government, installed at Košice on 4 April, then moved to Prague in May, was a National Front coalition in which three socialist parties—the Communist Party of Czechoslovakia (KSČ), the Czechoslovak Social democratic Party, and the Czechoslovak National Socialist Party—predominated. Certain non-socialist parties were included in the coalition, among them the Catholic People's Party (in Moravia) and the Democratic Party of Slovakia.

Following Nazi Germany's surrender, some 2.9 million ethnic Germans were expelled from Czechoslovakia with Allied approval, their property and rights declared void by the Beneš decrees.

Czechoslovakia soon came to fall within the Soviet sphere of influence. The popular enthusiasm evoked by the Soviet armies of liberation (which was decided by compromise of Allies and Joseph Stalin at the Yalta Conference in 1944) benefited the KSČ. Czechoslovaks, bitterly disappointed by the West at the Munich Agreement (1938), responded favorably to both the KSČ and the Soviet alliance. Reunited into one state after the war, the Czechs and Slovaks set national elections for the spring of 1946.

The democratic elements, led by President Edvard Beneš, hoped the Soviet Union would allow Czechoslovakia the freedom to choose its own form of government and aspired to a Czechoslovakia that would act as a bridge between East and West. Communists secured strong representation in the popularly elected National Committees, the new organs of local administration. In the May 1946 election, the KSČ won most of the popular vote in the Czech part of the bi-ethnic country (40.17%), and the more or less anti-Communist Democratic Party won in Slovakia (62%).

In sum, however, the KSČ only won a plurality of 38 percent of the vote at countrywide level. Edvard Beneš continued as president of the republic, whereas the Communist leader Klement Gottwald became prime minister. Most importantly, although the communists held only a minority of portfolios, they were able to gain control over most of the key ministries (Ministry of the Interior, etc.)

Although the communist-led government initially intended to participate in the Marshall Plan, it was forced by the Kremlin to back out. In 1947, Stalin summoned Gottwald to Moscow; upon his return to Prague, the KSČ demonstrated a significant radicalization of its tactics. On 20 February 1948, the twelve non-communist ministers resigned, in part to induce Beneš to call for early elections; however Beneš refused to accept the cabinet resignations and did not call elections. In the meantime, the KSČ marshalled its forces for the Czechoslovak coup d'état of 1948. The communist-controlled Ministry of the Interior deployed police regiments to sensitive areas and equipped a workers' militia. On 25 February Beneš, perhaps fearing Soviet intervention, capitulated. He accepted the resignations of the dissident ministers and received a new cabinet list from Gottwald, thus completing the communist takeover under the cover of superficial legality.

On 10 March 1948, the moderate foreign minister of the government, Jan Masaryk, was found dead in suspicious circumstances that have still not been definitively proved to constitute either suicide or political assassination.

=== Czechoslovak Socialist Republic (1948–1989) ===
In February 1948, the Communists took power in the 1948 Czechoslovak coup d'état, and Edvard Beneš inaugurated a new cabinet led by Klement Gottwald. Czechoslovakia was declared a "people's democracy" (until 1960) – a preliminary step towards socialism and, ultimately, communism. Bureaucratic centralism under the direction of KSČ leadership was introduced. Dissident elements were purged from all levels of society, including the Roman Catholic Church. The ideological principles of Marxism-Leninism and socialist realism pervaded cultural and intellectual life.

The economy was committed to comprehensive central planning and the abolition of private ownership of capital. Czechoslovakia became a satellite state of the Soviet Union; it was a founding member of the Council for Mutual Economic Assistance (Comecon) in 1949 and of the Warsaw Pact in 1955. The attainment of Soviet-style command socialism became the government's avowed policy.

Slovak autonomy was constrained; the Communist Party of Slovakia (KSS) was reunited with the KSČ (Communist Party of Czechoslovakia), but retained its own identity. Following the Soviet example, Czechoslovakia began emphasizing the rapid development of heavy industry. Although Czechoslovakia's industrial growth of 170 percent between 1948 and 1957 was impressive, it was far exceeded by that of Japan (300 percent) and the Federal Republic of Germany (almost 300 percent) and more than equaled by Austria and Greece.

Beneš refused to sign the Communist Constitution of 1948 (the Ninth-of-May Constitution) and resigned from the presidency; he was succeeded by Klement Gottwald. Gottwald died in March 1953. He was succeeded by Antonín Zápotocký as president and by Antonín Novotný as head of the KSČ.

In June 1953, thousands of workers in Plzeň went on strike to demonstrate against a currency reform that was considered a move to solidify Soviet socialism in Czechoslovakia. The demonstrations ended without significant bloodshed, disappointing American Director of Central Intelligence Allen Dulles, who wished for a pretext to help the Czechoslovak people resist the Soviets. For more than a decade thereafter, the Czechoslovak communist political structure was characterized by the orthodoxy of the leadership of party chief Antonín Novotný, who became president in 1957 when Zápotocký died.

In 1950 the government executed Operations K and R, two secret actions carried out by the Communist regime. Operation K targeted male religious orders on 13–14 April, while Operation Ř focused on female orders in two waves between July and September. The goal was to dismantle monastic life, seize church property, and place religious institutions under state control. In the 1950s, the Stalinists accused their opponents of "conspiracy against the people's democratic order" and "high treason" to oust them from positions of power. In all, the Communist Party tried 14 of its former leaders in November 1952 and sentenced 11 to death. Large-scale arrests of Communists and socialists with an "international" background, i.e., those with a wartime connection with the West, veterans of the Spanish Civil War, Jews, and Slovak "bourgeois nationalists," were followed by show trials. The outcome of these trials, serving the communist propaganda, was often known in advance and the penalties were extremely heavy, such as in the case of Milada Horáková, who was sentenced to death together with Jan Buchal, Záviš Kalandra and Oldřich Pecl.

The 1960 Constitution declared the victory of socialism and proclaimed the Czechoslovak Socialist Republic (CSSR).

De-Stalinization had a late start in Czechoslovakia. In the early 1960s, the Czechoslovak economy became severely stagnant. The industrial growth rate was the lowest in Eastern Europe. As a result, in 1965, the party approved the New Economic Model, introducing free market elements into the economy. The KSČ "Theses" of December 1965 presented the party response to the call for political reform. Democratic centralism was redefined, placing a stronger emphasis on democracy. The leading role of the KSČ was reaffirmed, but limited. Slovaks pressed for federalization. On 5 January 1968, the KSČ Central Committee elected Alexander Dubček, a Slovak reformer, to replace Novotný as first secretary of the KSČ. On 22 March 1968, Novotný resigned from the presidency and was succeeded by General Ludvík Svoboda.

==== Prague Spring (1968) ====
Dubček carried the reform movement a step further in the direction of liberalism. After Novotný's fall, censorship was lifted. The press, radio, and television were mobilized for reformist propaganda purposes. The movement to democratize socialism in Czechoslovakia, formerly confined largely to the party intelligentsia, acquired a new, popular dynamism in the spring of 1968 (the "Prague Spring"). Radical elements found expression; anti-Soviet polemics appeared in the press; the Social Democrats began to form a separate party; and new unaffiliated political clubs were created.

Party conservatives urged the implementation of repressive measures, but Dubček counseled moderation and re-emphasized KSČ leadership. In addition, the Dubček leadership called for politico-military changes in the Soviet-dominated Warsaw Pact and Council for Mutual Economic Assistance. The leadership affirmed its loyalty to socialism and the Warsaw Pact, but also expressed the desire to improve relations with all countries of the world, regardless of their social systems.

A program adopted in April 1968 set guidelines for a modern, humanistic socialist democracy that would guarantee, among other things, freedom of religion, press, assembly, speech, and travel, a program that, in Dubček's words, would give socialism "a human face." After 20 years of little public participation, the population gradually started to take interest in the government, and Dubček became a truly popular national figure.

The internal reforms and foreign policy statements of the Dubček leadership created great concern among some other Warsaw Pact governments. As a result, the troops of the Warsaw Pact countries (except for Romania) mounted a Soviet invasion of Czechoslovakia during the night of 20–21 August 1968. Two-thirds of the KSČ Central Committee opposed the Soviet intervention. Popular opposition was expressed in numerous spontaneous acts of non-violent resistance. In Prague and other cities throughout the republic, Czechs and Slovaks greeted Warsaw Pact soldiers with arguments and reproaches.

The Czechoslovak Government declared that the Warsaw Pact troops had not been invited into the country and that their invasion was a violation of socialist principles, international law, and the UN Charter. Dubček, who had been arrested on the night of 20 August, was taken to Moscow for negotiations. The outcome was the Brezhnev Doctrine of limited sovereignty, which provided for the strengthening of the KSČ, strict party control of the media, and the suppression of the Czechoslovak Social Democratic Party.

The principal Czechoslovak reformers were forcibly and secretly taken to the Soviet Union, where they signed a treaty that provided for the "temporary stationing" of an unspecified number of Soviet troops in Czechoslovakia. Dubček was removed as party First Secretary on 17 April 1969, and replaced by another Slovak, Gustáv Husák. Later, Dubček and many of his allies within the party were stripped of their party positions in a purge that lasted until 1971 and reduced party membership by almost one-third.

On 19 January 1969, the student Jan Palach set himself on fire in Prague's Wenceslas Square to protest the invasion of Czechoslovakia by the Soviet Union. His death shocked many observers throughout the world.

==== Aftermath ====
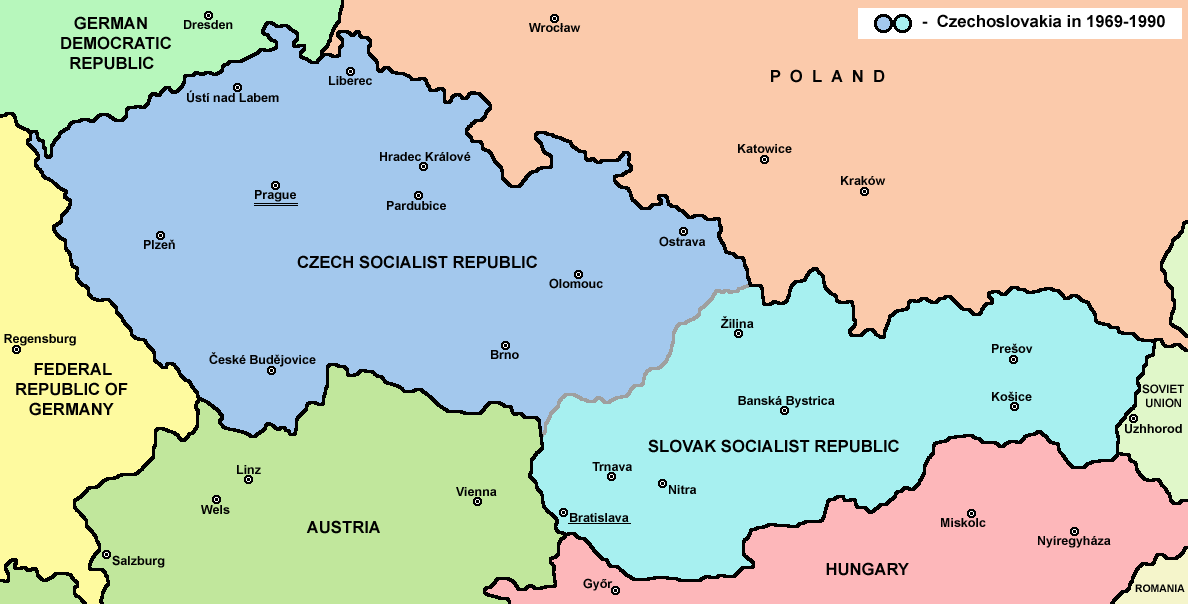
A map of Czechoslovakia between 1969 and 1990.

The Slovak part of Czechoslovakia made major gains in industrial production in the 1960s and 1970s. By the 1970s, its industrial production was near parity with that of the Czech lands. Slovakia's portion of per capita national income rose from slightly more than 60 percent of that of Bohemia and Moravia in 1948 to nearly 80 percent in 1968, and Slovak per capita earning power equaled that of the Czechs in 1971. The pace of Slovak economic growth has continued to exceed that of Czech growth to the present day (2003).

Dubcek remained in office only until April 1969. Gustáv Husák (a centrist, and one of the Slovak "bourgeois nationalists" imprisoned by his own KSČ in the 1950s) was named first secretary (title changed to general secretary in 1971). A program of "Normalization" – the restoration of continuity with the prereform period—was initiated. Normalization entailed thoroughgoing political repression and the return to ideological conformity. A new purge cleansed the Czechoslovak leadership of all reformist elements.

Anti-Soviet demonstrations in August 1969 ushered in a period of harsh repression. The 1970s and 1980s became known as the period of "normalization," in which the apologists for the 1968 Soviet invasion prevented, as best they could, any opposition to their conservative regime. Political, social, and economic life stagnated. The population, cowed by the "normalization," was quiet. The only point required during the Prague Spring that was achieved was the federalization of the country (as of 1969), which however was more or less only formal under the normalization. The newly created Federal Assembly (i.e., federal parliament), which replaced the National Assembly, was to work in close cooperation with the Czech National Council and the Slovak National Council (i.e., national parliaments).

In 1975, Gustáv Husák added the position of president to his post as party chief. The Husák regime required conformity and obedience in all aspects of life. Husák also tried to obtain acquiescence to his rule by providing an improved standard of living. He returned Czechoslovakia to an orthodox command economy with a heavy emphasis on central planning and continued to extend industrialization.

For a while the policy seemed successful; the 1980s, however, were more or less a period of economic stagnation. Another feature of Husák's rule was a continued dependence on the Soviet Union. In the 1980s, approximately 50 percent of Czechoslovakia's foreign trade was with the Soviet Union, and almost 80 percent was with communist countries.

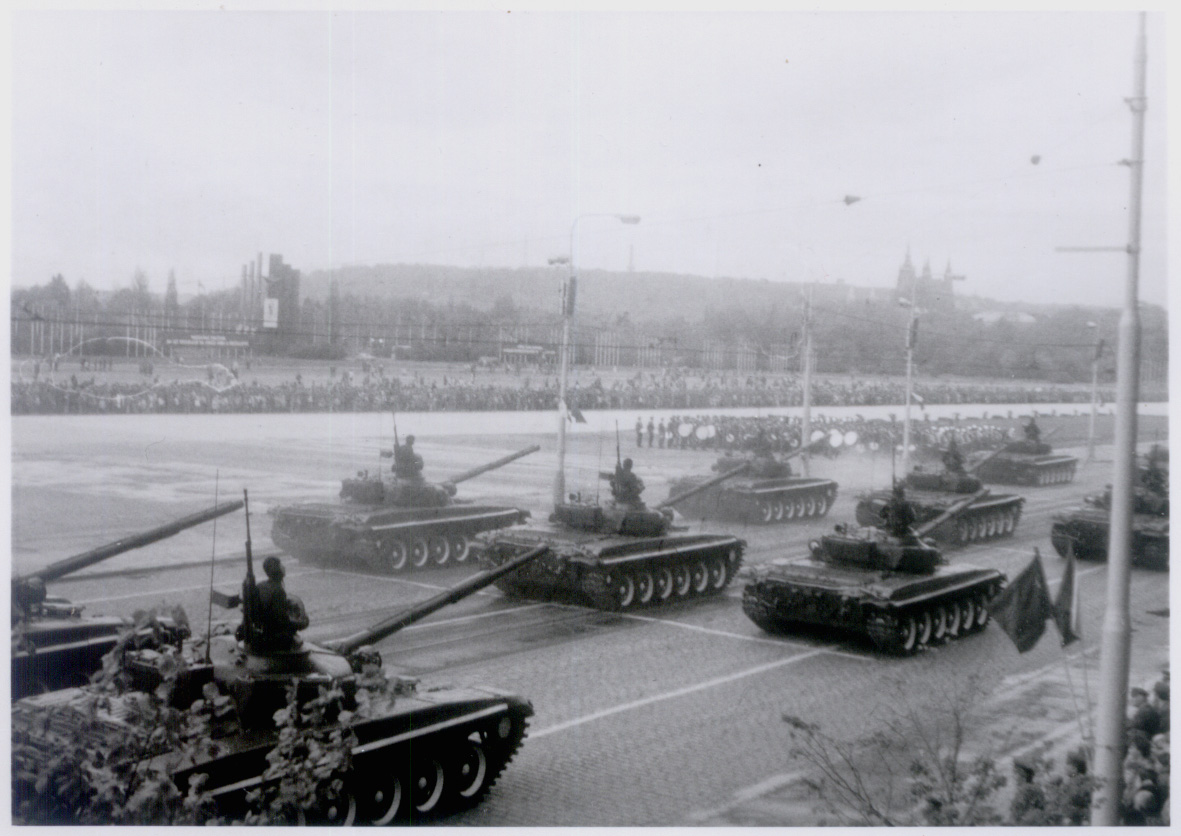
Czechoslovak military parade in Prague, 9 May 1985.

Through the 1970s and 1980s, the regime was challenged by individuals and organized groups aspiring to independent thinking and activity. The first organized opposition emerged under the umbrella of Charter 77. On 6 January 1977, a manifesto called Charter 77 appeared in West German newspapers. The original manifesto reportedly was signed by 243 persons; among them were artists, former public officials, and other prominent figures.

The Charter had over 800 signatures by the end of 1977, including workers and youth. It criticized the government for failing to implement human rights provisions of documents it had signed, including the state's own constitution; international covenants on political, civil, economic, social, and cultural rights; and the Final Act of the Conference for Security and Cooperation in Europe. Although not organized in any real sense, the signatories of Charter 77 constituted a citizens' initiative aimed at inducing the Czechoslovak Government to observe formal obligations to respect the human rights of its citizens.

Signatories were arrested and interrogated; dismissal from employment often followed. Because religion offered possibilities for thought and activities independent of the state, it too was severely restricted and controlled. Clergymen were required to be licensed. Unlike in Poland, dissent and independent activity were limited in Czechoslovakia to a fairly small segment of the population. Many Czechs and Slovaks emigrated to the West.

==== Final years of the Communist era ====
Although, in March 1987, Husák nominally committed Czechoslovakia to follow the program of Mikhail Gorbachev's perestroika, it did not happen much in reality. On 17 December 1987, Husák, who was one month away from his seventy-fifth birthday, had resigned as head of the KSČ. He retained, however, his post of president of Czechoslovakia and his full membership on the Presidium of the KSČ. Miloš Jakeš, who replaced Husák as first secretary of the KSČ, did not change anything. The slow pace of the Czechoslovak reform movement was an irritant to the Soviet leadership.

The first anti-Communist demonstration took place on 25 March 1988 in Bratislava (the Candle demonstration in Bratislava). It was an unauthorized peaceful gathering of some 2,000 (other sources 10,000) Roman Catholics. Demonstrations also occurred on 21 August 1988 (the anniversary of the Soviet intervention in 1968) in Prague, on 28 October 1988 (establishment of Czechoslovakia in 1918) in Prague, Bratislava and some other towns, in January 1989 (death of Jan Palach on 16 January 1969), on 21 August 1989 (see above) and on 28 October 1989 (see above).

==== Velvet Revolution (1989) ====
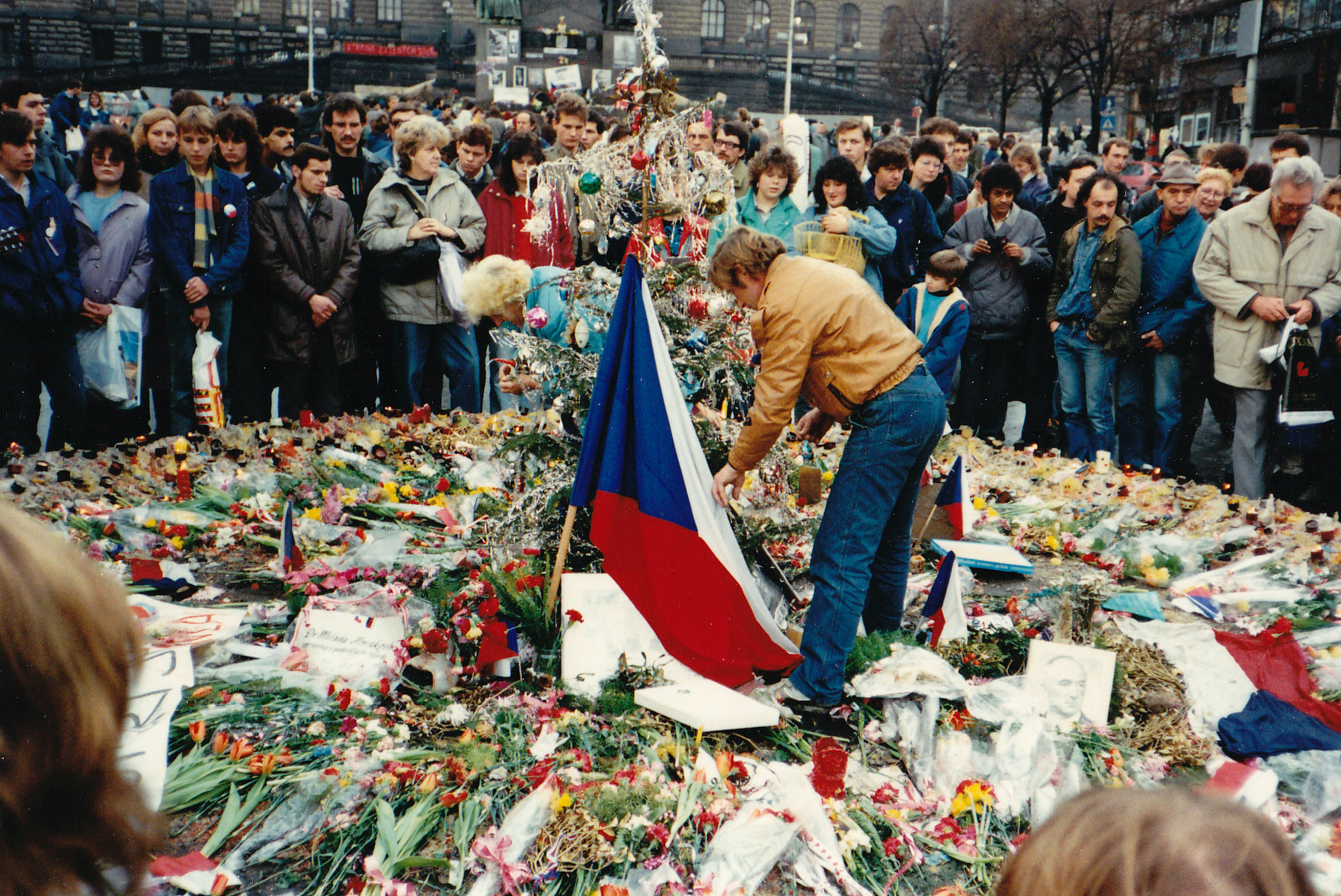
Václav Havel at a peaceful Prague protest during the Velvet Revolution.

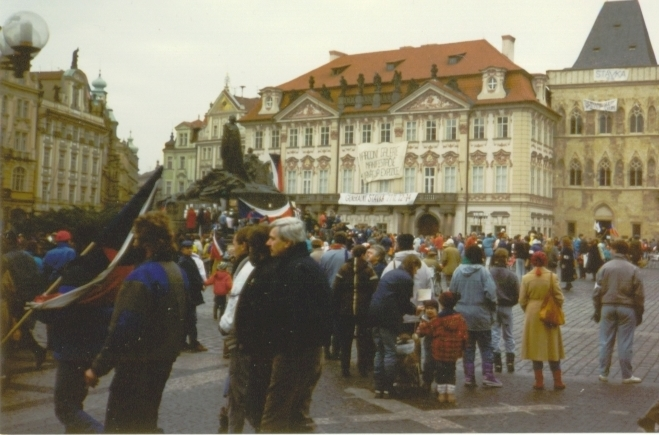
A gathering in Old Town in November 1989 during Velvet Revolution.

The anti-Communist revolution started on 16 November 1989 in Bratislava, with a demonstration of Slovak university students for democracy, and continued with the well-known similar demonstration of Czech students in Prague on 17 November.

On 17 November 1989, the communist police violently broke up a peaceful pro-democracy demonstration, brutally beating many student participants. In the following days, Charter 77 and other groups united to become the Civic Forum, an umbrella group championing bureaucratic reform and civil liberties. Its leader was the dissident playwright Václav Havel. Intentionally eschewing the label "party", a word given a negative connotation during the previous regime, Civic Forum quickly gained the support of millions of Czechs, as did its Slovak counterpart, Public Against Violence.

Faced with an overwhelming popular repudiation, the Communist Party all but collapsed. Its leaders, Husák and party chief Miloš Jakeš, resigned in December 1989, and Havel was elected President of Czechoslovakia on 29 December. The astonishing quickness of these events was in part due to the unpopularity of the communist regime and changes in the policies of its Soviet guarantor as well as to the rapid, effective organization of these public initiatives into a viable opposition.

=== Democratic Czechoslovakia (1989–1992) ===
The Ladislav Adamec government governed 12 October 1988 until 10 December 1989. Adamec resigned on 7 December and Marián Čalfa became an interim. On 10 December, Gustáv Husák, longterm Leader of Czechoslovakia, appointed a government led by Čalfa (de). It was coalition government and the first government in which the Communist Party had a minority of ministerial positions.
The first free elections in Czechoslovakia since 1946 took place on 8/9 June 1990 without incident. Population voting was 96.69%. As anticipated, Civic Forum and Public Against Violence won landslide victories in their respective republics and gained a comfortable majority in the federal parliament. The parliament undertook substantial steps toward securing the democratic evolution of Czechoslovakia. It successfully moved toward fair local elections in November 1990, ensuring fundamental change at the county and town level.

Civic Forum found, however, that although it had successfully completed its primary objective—the overthrow of the communist regime—it was ineffectual as a governing party. The demise of Civic Forum was viewed by most as necessary and inevitable.

By the end of 1990, unofficial parliamentary "clubs" had evolved with distinct political agendas. Most influential was the Civic Democratic Party, headed by Václav Klaus. Other notable parties that came into being after the split were the Czech Social Democratic Party, Civic Movement, and Civic Democratic Alliance.

=== Dissolution of Czechoslovakia ===
By 1992, Slovak calls for greater autonomy effectively blocked the daily functioning of the federal government. In the election of June 1992, Klaus's Civic Democratic Party won handily in the Czech lands on a platform of economic reform. Vladimír Mečiar's Movement for a Democratic Slovakia emerged as the leading party in Slovakia, basing its appeal on fairness to Slovak demands for autonomy. Federalists, like Havel, were unable to contain the trend toward the split. On 20 July 1992, President Havel resigned. In the latter half of 1992, Klaus and Mečiar hammered out an agreement that the two republics would go their separate ways by the end of 1992.

Members of Czechoslovakia's parliament (the Federal Assembly), divided along national lines, barely cooperated enough to pass the law officially separating the two nations in late 1992. On 1 January 1993, the Czech Republic and Slovakia were simultaneously and peacefully established as independent states.

Relationships between the two states, despite occasional disputes about the division of federal property and the governing of the border, have been peaceful. Both states attained immediate diplomatic recognition from their European neighbors and the US.

== Economic history ==
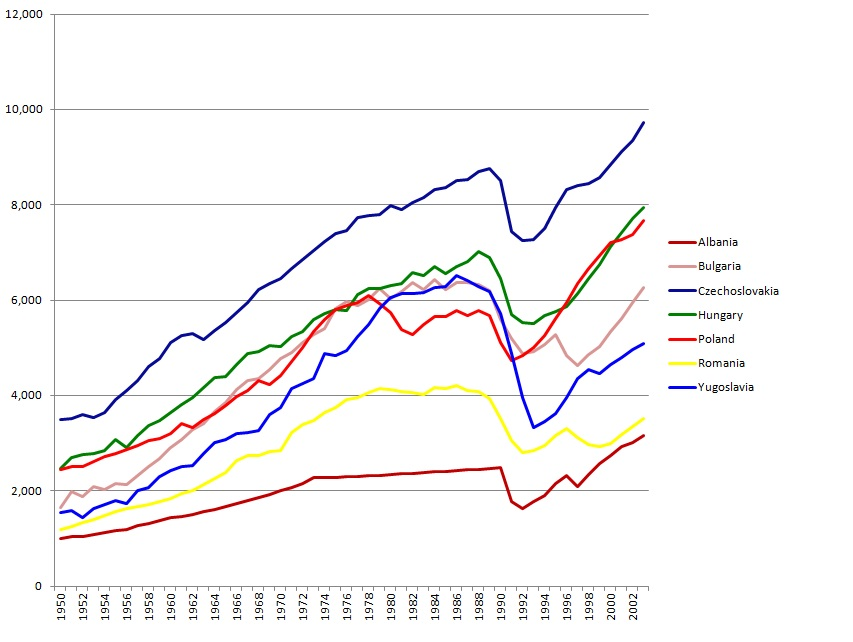
Per capita GDP from 1950 to 2003 in the Eastern Bloc (1990 base Geary-Khamis dollars).

At the time of the communist takeover, Czechoslovakia was devastated by WWII. Almost 1 million people, out of a prewar population of 15 million, had been killed. An additional 3 million Germans were expelled in 1945 and 1946. From 14 June 1948 until his death (14 March 1953), Klement Gottwald was President of Czechoslovakia. His government began to stress heavy industry over agricultural and consumer goods and services. Many basic industries and foreign trade, as well as domestic wholesale trade, had been nationalized before the communists took power. Nationalization of most of the retail trade was completed in 1950–1951.

Heavy industry received major economic support during the 1950s. Although the labor force was traditionally skilled and efficient, inadequate incentives for labor and management contributed to high labor turnover, low productivity, and poor product quality. Economic failures reached a critical stage in the 1960s, after which various reform measures were sought with no satisfactory results.

Hope for wide-ranging economic reform came with Alexander Dubcek's rise in January 1968. Despite renewed efforts, however, Czechoslovakia could not come to grips with inflationary forces, much less begin the immense task of correcting the economy's basic problems.

The economy saw growth during the 1970s but then stagnated between 1978 and 1982. Attempts at revitalizing it in the 1980s with management and worker incentive programs were largely unsuccessful. The economy grew after 1982, achieving an annual average output growth of more than 3% between 1983 and 1985. Imports from Western countries were curtailed, exports boosted, and hard currency debt reduced substantially. New investment was made in the electronic, chemical, and pharmaceutical sectors, which were industry leaders in eastern Europe in the mid-1980s.

== See also ==
- History of the Czech lands
- History of the Czech Republic
- History of Slovakia
