= Gustáv Husák =

Leader of Czechoslovakia from 1969 to 1987

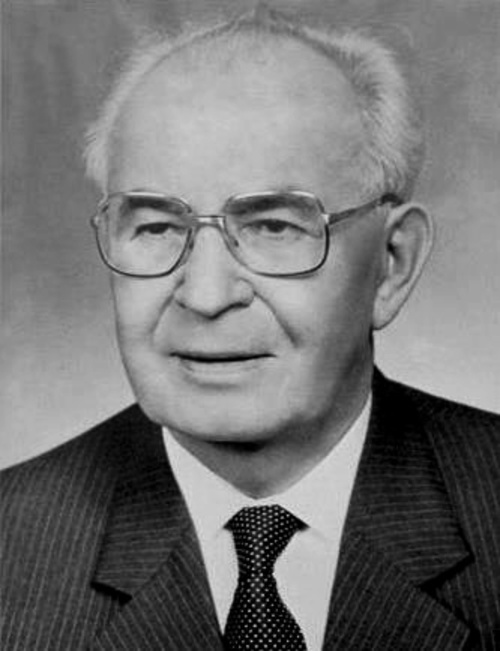
- Husák in 1989

First Secretary of the Communist Party of Czechoslovakia
- In office 17 April 1969 – 17 December 1987
- Preceded by: Alexander Dubček
- Succeeded by: Miloš Jakeš

President of Czechoslovakia
- In office 29 May 1975 – 10 December 1989
- Prime Minister: Lubomír Štrougal; Ladislav Adamec
- Preceded by: Ludvík Svoboda
- Succeeded by: Václav Havel

Personal details
- Born: 10 January 1913 Dúbravka, Austria-Hungary
- Died: 18 November 1991 (aged 78) Bratislava, Czechoslovakia
- Party: Communist Party of Czechoslovakia
- Spouse: Magda Husáková-Lokvencová (m. 1938; div. 1966) Viera Husáková-Čáslavská (m. 1975; died 1977)
- Children: 2
- Education: Comenius University
- De facto ruler of the ČSSR: ← Dubček; Jakeš →

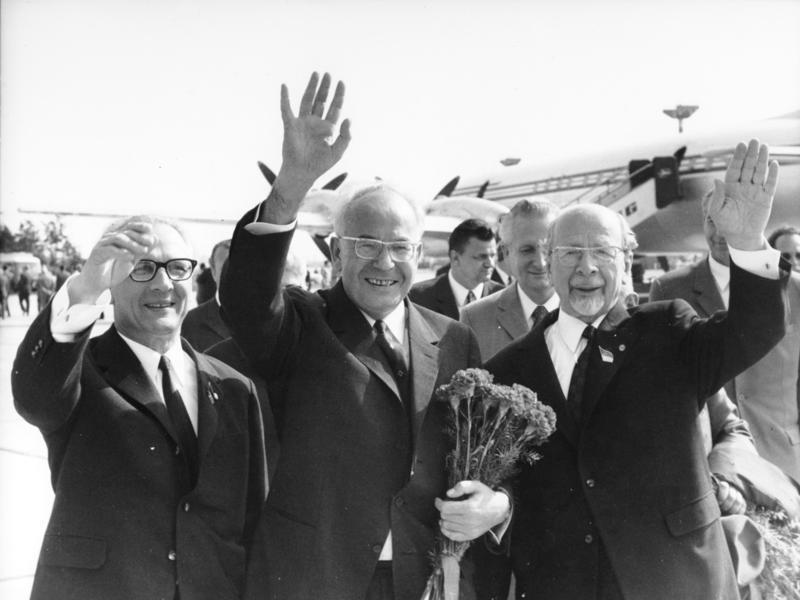
Gustáv Husák (in the middle) in 1971 on a visit to the GDR. Walter Ulbricht and Erich Honecker are also pictured.

Gustáv Husák (UK: /ˈhuːsæk/ HOO-sak, US: /ˈh(j)uːsɑːk/ HOO-sahk, HEW-; Slovak: [ˈɡustaːw ˈɦusaːk]; born Augustin Husák; 10 January 1913 – 18 November 1991) was a Slovak politician who served as the long-time First Secretary of the Communist Party of Czechoslovakia from 1969 to 1987 and the President of Czechoslovakia from 1975 to 1989.

Trained as a lawyer, Husák rose through the ranks of the prewar and wartime Communist Party of Czechoslovakia and played a leading role in the abortive Slovak National Uprising. He participated in the communist takeover of Czechoslovakia, but fell victim to a Stalinist purge in 1950. After being released from prison, he became a critic of Antonín Novotný's hardline governance, for which he was made a vice-premier in the government of Alexander Dubček during the Prague Spring. However, Husák came to share the Soviet Union's suspicion of Dubček's reforms, and established himself as a staunch anti-reformist in the wake of the invasion of Czechoslovakia. Husák was soon appointed leader of the Communist Party and General Secretary in Dubček's place, and presided over the period of normalization, whereby the Czechoslovak government reestablished its ties to the Warsaw Pact and aimed to preserve stable communist governance while minimizing social unrest.

The reforms of Mikhail Gorbachev challenged Husák's governance, but he initially hoped to stay neutral in the conflict between hardliners and reformists. Husák's resignation from leadership in 1987 did little to thwart the collapse of communist rule in the 1989 Velvet Revolution. He died in 1991, a few months after he was expelled by the reformed Communist Party. Husák was known as a sophisticated intellectual and skilled politician, but his pro-Soviet leadership was repudiated by the Velvet Revolution and subsequent political developments in the Czech Republic and Slovakia.

== Early life, education, and career ==
Augustin Husák was born to Nikodém Husák and his wife Magdaléna née Fratričová in Pozsonyhidegkút, Kingdom of Hungary, Austria-Hungary (now Bratislava-Dúbravka, Slovakia). His father was a trained quarryman and farmer who was disabled in World War I and was sporadically employed afterwards; he worked in municipal administration and briefly served as mayor of Dúbravka. His mother died of tuberculosis when he was one year old and his father remarried; the household would eventually become crowded with ten members. Early in his schooling, he began going by the name of Gustáv, the name of his grandfather, he fully adopted the name after using it as a nom de guerre during World War II.

He distinguished himself academically and spent much of his youth at boarding schools in Bratislava, but his family's relative poverty necessitated that he take up odd jobs and send his earnings home. He joined the Communist Youth Union at the age of sixteen, after being influenced by ideologically engaged colleagues at the Patrónka arms factory, where he worked for a summer. He joined the Youth Union in 1929 at a crucial point, when the Czechoslovak Communist Party was being more closely integrated into the Comintern. Husák aligned himself with the pro-Soviet faction under Klement Gottwald. He met his wife, Magda Lokvencová, at a communist conference in Bratislava in 1935, and married her in 1939.

In 1933, when he started his studies at the law faculty of the Comenius University in Bratislava, he joined the Communist Party of Czechoslovakia (KSČ) which was banned from 1938 to 1945. During World War II, he was periodically jailed by the Jozef Tiso government for illegal Communist activities. He was one of the leaders of the 1944 Slovak National Uprising against Nazi Germany and Tiso. Husák was a member of the Presidium of the Slovak National Council from 1 to 5 September 1944.

After the war, he began a career as a government official in Slovakia and party functionary in Czechoslovakia. From 1946 to 1950, he was the head of the devolved administration of Slovakia, and as such strongly contributed to the liquidation of the anti-communist Christian democratic Democratic Party of Slovakia. The Democratic Party of Slovakia established in 1944 had taken 62% in the 1946 elections in Slovakia (whereas in the Czech part of the republic of then-Czechoslovakia, the clear winners were the Communists), thus complicating the Communist ambitions for a swift taking of power. Husák's loyalty to the central organs of the Czechoslovak Communist party as well as his considerable talent for body politics and a ruthless approach to political opponents contributed largely to the crushing of the Democratic Party's dissent in Slovakia and releasing the popular opinion in the country to the whims of prevailing political currents.

In 1950, he fell victim to a Stalinist purge of the party leadership, and was sentenced to life imprisonment, spending the years from 1954 to 1960 in the Leopoldov Prison. A convinced Communist, he always viewed his imprisonment as a gross misunderstanding, which he periodically stressed in several letters of appeal addressed to the party leadership. It is generally acknowledged that the then party leader and president Antonín Novotný repeatedly declined to pardon Husák, assuring his comrades that "you do not know what he is capable of if he comes to power".

As part of the De-Stalinization period in Czechoslovakia, Husák's conviction was overturned and his party membership restored in 1963. By 1967, he had become a critic of Novotný and the KSČ's neo-Stalinist leadership. In April 1968, during the Prague Spring under new party leader and fellow Slovak Alexander Dubček, Husák became a vice-premier of Czechoslovakia, responsible for overseeing reforms in Slovakia.

== Leader of Czechoslovakia ==
As the Soviet Union grew increasingly alarmed by Dubček's liberal reforms in 1968 (Prague Spring), Husák, originally Dubček's ally and a moderate supporter of the reform programme, began calling for caution.

After the Soviets invaded Czechoslovakia in August, Husák participated in the Czechoslovak-Soviet negotiations between the kidnapped Dubček and Leonid Brezhnev in Moscow. Husák changed course and became a leader among those party members calling for the reversal of Dubček's reforms. An account for his pragmatism was given in one of his official speeches in Slovakia after the 1968 events, during which he ventured a rhetorical question, asking where the opponents of the Soviet Union wished to find allies of Czechoslovakia that might come to support the country against Soviet troops.

Supported by Moscow, he was appointed leader of the Communist Party of Slovakia in as early as August 1968, and he succeeded Dubček as first secretary (title changed to general secretary in 1971) of the Communist Party of Czechoslovakia in April 1969. He reversed Dubček's reforms and purged the party of its liberal members in 1969–1971. In 1975, Husák was elected President of Czechoslovakia. During the two decades of Husák's leadership, known as the era of Normalization, Czechoslovakia became one of Moscow's most loyal allies.

In the first years following the invasion, Husák managed to appease the outraged civil population by providing a relatively satisfactory living standard and avoiding any overt reprisals as were seen in the 1950s. His regime was not a complete return to the heavy-handed Stalinism that had prevailed during the first 20 years of Communist rule in the country. At the same time, the people's rights were somewhat more restricted than was the case in János Kádár's Hungary and Josip Broz Tito's Yugoslavia. Indeed, on the cultural level, the level of repression approached that seen in Erich Honecker's East Germany and even Nicolae Ceaușescu's Romania. There was a campaign of repression by the secret police (StB) targeting dissidents represented later by Charter 77 as well as hundreds of unknown individuals who happened to be targets of the StB's pre-emptive strikes. The repression intensified over the years as Husák grew more conservative.

Starting in the early 1970s, Husák allowed those who had been purged in the aftermath of Prague Spring to rejoin the party. However, they were required to publicly distance themselves from their past support for reform.

The latter part of Husák's tenure saw a struggle within the Politburo over whether to adopt a version of Mikhail Gorbachev's reforms. Gorbachev himself had cooled on Husák; by 1988, he saw Husák as a member of what he called the "Gang of Four" including Honecker, Ceaușescu, and Bulgaria's Todor Zhivkov—inflexible hardliners unwilling to make reforms needed to save Communism.

While the hardliners, led by Vasiľ Biľak, were vehemently opposed to glasnost and perestroika, moderates led by Prime Minister Lubomír Štrougal strongly favoured reform. Husák himself stayed neutral until April 1987, when he announced a somewhat half-hearted reform program scheduled to start in 1991.

Later that year, however, Husák yielded his post as general secretary to Miloš Jakeš in response to a desire for younger leaders (Jakeš and Ladislav Adamec) to share in power.

On 24 November 1989, the entire Presidum of the Communist Party, including Husák, resigned in the wake of the Velvet Revolution. The party officially abandoned power four days later, when the legislature deleted the portions of the Constitution that codified the party's "leading role." On 10 December, Husák swore in a new government. Although it was headed by communist Marián Čalfa, it had a non-communist majority—the first in 41 years that was not dominated by communists and/or fellow travelers. He resigned later that day, just hours after presiding over the formal end of the regime he had largely created. In an attempt to rehabilitate its image ahead of the first free elections in 44 years, the Communist Party expelled him in February 1990.

He died on 18 November 1991, at the age of 78, and was buried at the Dúbravka cemetery.

== Personal life ==
He was married twice, first to actress Magda Husáková-Lokvencová from 1938 to 1967 (she died the year before). He then was married to Viera Husáková-Čáslavská. The marriage to Husáková-Čáslavská did not take place until 1973, when Husák visited to India. Because Husák was divorced, a hasty and secret wedding took place before the trip. Viera continued to live in Bratislava thereafter, traveling to Prague only for official events or weekends. In 20 October 1977, she died in a helicopter crash at Bratislava Airport. His wife's death shook him greatly, he completely withdrew from public life for several weeks, and his mental state was evident even in his New Year's speech on January 1, 1978. He had two sons with his first wife, Vladimír and Ján. Vladimír was born in Moscow. Outside of Czech and Slovak, he was fluent in Russian and German.

== Legacy ==
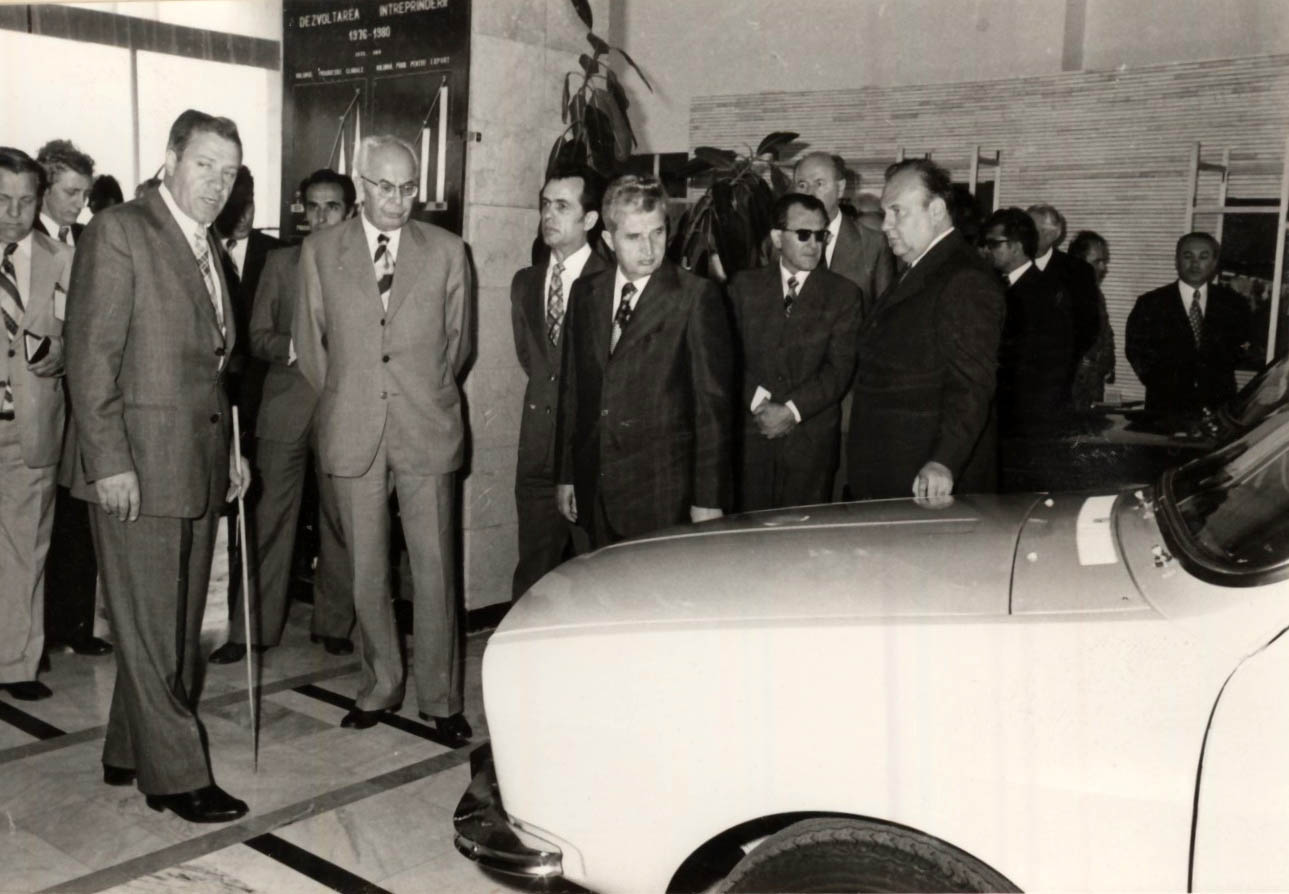
Gustáv Husák and Ceaușescu at the Pitești Car Factory, June 1977

There is still some question about Husák's moral culpability for the last two decades of Communist rule in Czechoslovakia. After its collapse, Husák kept saying that he was just trying to diminish the aftermath of the Soviet invasion and had to constantly resist pressure from hard line Stalinists in the party such as Biľak, Alois Indra and the like. In the early 1970s, he personally pushed for an early withdrawal of the Soviet troops from Czechoslovak territory, which did not happen until 1991; this may be ascribed to his pragmatic attempts to ease the situation and to give an impression that things were leaning toward "normality".

However, there are many ways in which he personally contributed to the Communist government's longevity and policies. As the General Secretary of the Party, he was the nominal leader of the repressive state apparatus. There are many documented cases of appeals from politically persecuted persons, but almost none of them was given Husák's attention. As the overall decay of Czechoslovak society was becoming more and more obvious in the 1980s, Husák became a politically impotent puppet of events.

Gustáv Husák was awarded the title Hero of the Czechoslovak Socialist Republic three times, in 1969, 1973, and 1982. In 1983 he was awarded the title of Hero of the Soviet Union.

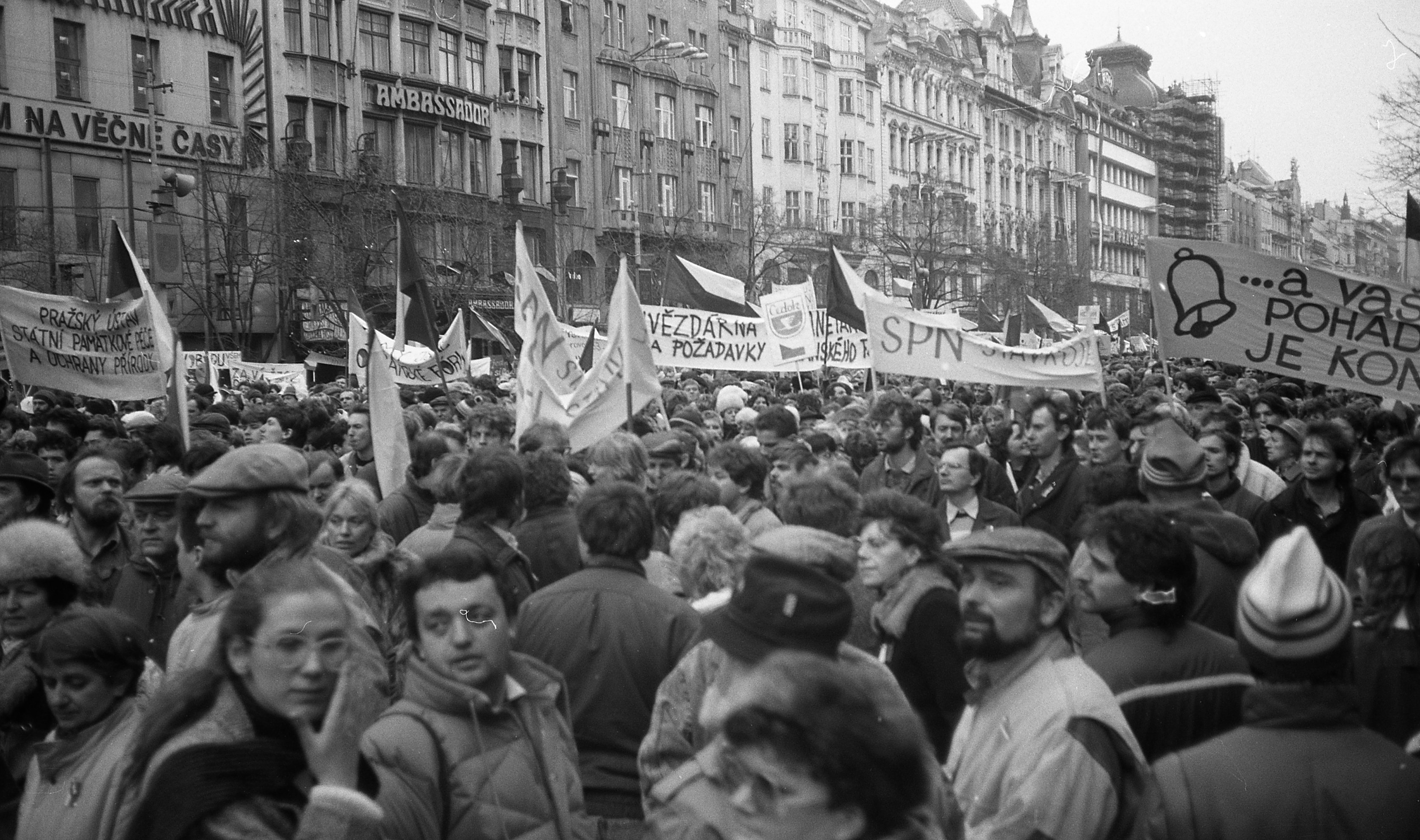
Velvet revolution in 1989

Husák allegedly confessed to a Catholic priest before his death, having previously been an atheist. On his deathbed in 1991, Husák received the sacrament of reconciliation from a Catholic archbishop, Ján Sokol.

== Awards and honors ==
- Czechoslovakia:
  - Hero of the Czechoslovak Socialist Republic, thrice (1969, 1972, 1982)
  - Order of Klement Gottwald, four times
  - Order of Victorious February
- Soviet Union:
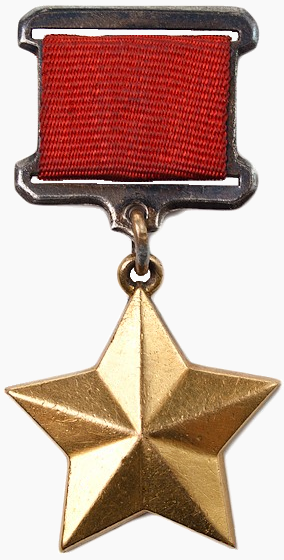
  - Hero of the Soviet Union (1983)
  - Orders of Lenin, four times (1969, 1973, 1983, 1988)
  - Order of the October Revolution (1978)
  - Jubilee Medal "In Commemoration of the 100th Anniversary of the Birth of Vladimir Ilyich Lenin" (1969)
- Other countries:
  - Grand Cross of the Order of May (Argentina)
  - Order of Georgi Dimitrov, twice (Bulgaria)
  - Order of the Balkan Mountains (Bulgaria)
  - Order of Jose Marti (Cuba)
  - Order of Playa Girón (Cuba)
  - Order of Karl Marx, twice (East Germany)
  - Grand Cross of the White Rose of Finland (Finland)
  - Order of the Flag of the Republic of Hungary (Hungary)
  - Order of Pahlavi (Iran)
  - Order of Sukhbaatar, thrice (Mongolia)
  - Order of the National Flag 1st class, twice (North Korea)
  - Order of the Grand Cross of the Rebirth of Poland (Poland)
  - Order of the Star of the Romanian Socialist Republic 1st class (Romania)
  - Order of Victory of Socialism (Romania)
  - Order of Civil Merit (Syria)
  - Gold Star Order (Vietnam)
  - Order of the Yugoslav Great Star (Yugoslavia)

== Functions ==
Communist Party of Czechoslovakia/KSČ (prohibited 1938, dissolved 1939–1945)

- 1933-1938/1939 and 1989 (December)-(February) 1990: common member
- spring 1945: member of its Provisional Central Committee (established in the parts of Czechoslovakia liberated by the Red Army)
- 1949-1951 and 1968 (31 August)-1989: member of its Central Committee
- 1968 (31 August)-1989 (24 November): member of its Presidium
- 1969 (April) -1987 (December): one of its secretaries
- 1969 (April)-1987: party leader (First Secretary, since 1971 Secretary General of the Central Committee of the Communist Party of Czechoslovakia)
- 1987 (17 December): resigned as party leader (replaced by Miloš Jakeš)

Communist Party of Slovakia/KSS (illegal 1939–1944/1945)

- 1939-1945: one of its leaders
- 1943-1944: member of its 5th illegal Central Committee
- 1944-1950 and 1968–1971: member of its Central Committee and (except for 1970–1971) member of its Presidium and (except for 1944–1948) one of its secretaries
- 1944-1945: vice-chairman
- 1968 (28 August)-1969: party leader ("first secretary")

Slovak National Council (Slovenská národná rada) (during World War II a resistance parliament-government, since 1968 the Slovak parliament)

- 1943-1944: one of its main organizers
- 1944-1950 and 1968 (December)-1971: its deputy
- 1944-1950: member of its Presidium
- 1944-1945: vice-chairman

Board of Commissioners (Zbor povereníkov) (a quasi government responsible for Slovakia)

- 1944-1945: Commissioner of the Interior
- 1945-1946: Commissioner of Transport and Technology in Slovakia
- 1946-1950: President of the Board of Commissioners, in which he contributed to the suppression of the influential Democratic Party of Slovakia by the Communists (1947–1948)
- 1948-1950: Commissioner of Agriculture and Land Reform in Slovakia
- 1949-1950: Commissioner of Alimentation in Slovakia

Czechoslovak Parliament (called National Assembly and since 1968 Federal Assembly)

- 1945-1951 and 1968–1975: deputy
- 1969-1975: member of its Presidium

Czechoslovak government

- 1968 (April–December): a vice-premier of the Prague Spring Czechoslovak government

President of Czechoslovakia

- 1975-1989: President of Czechoslovakia
- 1989 (10 December): resigned as the President of Czechoslovakia within the Velvet Revolution

== Other important data ==
- 1929–1932: member of the Communist Youth Union (prohibited in 1932)
- 1933–1937: studies at the law faculty of the Comenius University in Bratislava,
- 1938 received a title Dr. (of law) and started to work as a lawyer in Bratislava
- 1936–1938: member of the Slovak Youth Union (1936 founder and secretary)
- 1937–1938 vice-president of the Slovak Students Union and secretary of the Association for the Economic and Cultural Cooperation with the Soviet Union
- 1940–1944: four times shortly jailed by the government of Jozef Tiso for illegal Communist activities
- 1943–1944: member of the 5th illegal KSS Central Committee, one of the main organizers of the anti-Nazi Slovak National Uprising (1944) and of its leading body, the Slovak National Council
- late 1944–February 1945: he fled to Moscow after the defeat of the Slovak National Uprising
- 1950: charged with "bourgeois nationalism" with respect to Slovakia (see History of Czechoslovakia)
- 1951: arrested
- 1954: sentenced to life imprisonment
- 1954–1960: imprisoned
- 1960: conditionally released through an amnesty
- 1963: his conviction was overturned and his party membership restored and he was rehabilitated
- 1963–1968: scientific employee of the State and Law Institute of the Slovak Academy of Sciences
- 1969 (April)–1987 (December): chief commander of the Popular Militia
- 1971 (January)–1987 (December): president and member of the Presidium of the National Front Central Committee

== See also ==
- Husakism
- Husák's Children
- History of Czechoslovakia
- Lennon Wall

== Literature ==
- MACHÁČEK, Michal. Gustáv Husák. Prague : Vyšehrad 2017, 632 pp. ISBN 978-80-7429-388-7.
- MACHÁČEK, Michal. The Strange Unity. Gustáv Husák and Power and Political Fights Inside the Communist Party of Czechoslovakia as Exemplified by Presidency Issue (1969–1975), in: Czech Journal of Contemporary History, 2016, vol. 4, 104–128 pp. .

Political offices
| Preceded by Ludvík Svoboda | President of Czechoslovakia; 29 May 1975 – 10 December 1989 | Succeeded by Václav Havel |
Party political offices
| Preceded by Alexander Dubček | First Secretary of the Communist Party of Czechoslovakia; 17 April 1969 – 17 December 1987 | Succeeded by Miloš Jakeš |
