= Naděžda Plíšková =

Czech poet and artist (1934–1999)

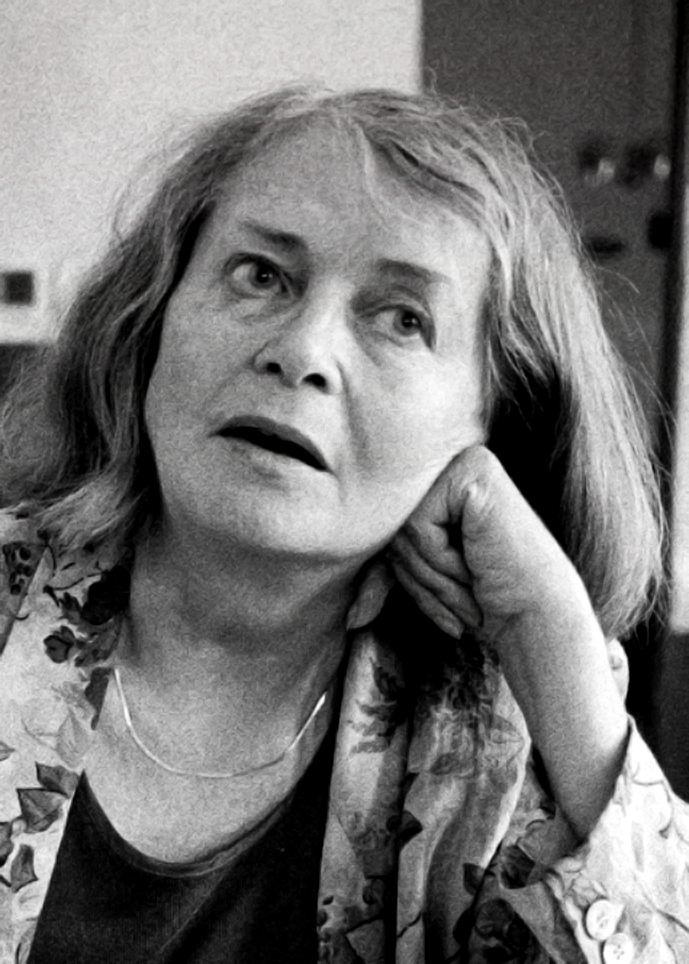
- Naděžda Plíšková, photo by Hana Hamplová
- Born: 6 November 1934; Rozdělov u Kladna
- Died: 16 September 1999 (aged 64); Prague
- Education: Academy of Fine Arts, Prague
- Known for: printmaker, painter, ceramist, sculptor, poet
- Partner: Karel Nepraš
- Children: Karolína Neprašová, artist

Naděžda Plíšková (6 November 1934 in Rozdělov u Kladna – 16 September 1999 in Prague) was a Czech printmaker, painter, ceramist, author of sculptural objects and poet.

== Life ==
Naděžda Plíšková studied graphic art at the Higher School of Arts and Crafts in Prague (1950-1954, prof. Jaroslav Vodrážka) and in 1954-1958 she studied graphic art at the Academy of Fine Arts in Prague (prof. Vladimír Silovský). In 1958-1959 she took a scholarship at the Hochschule für Grafik und Buchkunst Leipzig (prof. Gerhard Kurt Miller), which she completed with a series of woodcuts for books by Karel Čapek. She was then accepted to study painting in the studio of Prof. Karel Souček at the Academy of Fine Arts in Prague, where she spent two more honorary years after graduation (1961) and passed the state exam (Prof. Jiří Kotalík).

In addition to printmaking, she worked on ceramics, wrote poetry and socialised with artists and theoreticians from the Křižovnická School. (Note: The Křižovnická school of pure humour without jokes was an informal pub association of young artists, musicians and writers that met in the now defunct restaurant U Křižovníků in the Prague Old Town. Among its members were: the directors - draughtsman and author of conceptual actions Jan Steklík and sculptor Karel Nepraš, painters Zdeněk Beran, Rudolf Němec, Zbyšek Sion, Otakar Slavík, Antonín Tomalík, graphic artist Naděžda Plíšková, poet and conceptualist Eugen Brikcius, art theoreticians Věra Jirousová and Ivan Martin Jirous, experimental poets Josef Procházka and Vladimír Burda. For the members of Křižovnická school and their friends, collective action was a reliable form of defence. The works created at the time of the greatest flowering of this association, as if on the outskirts of general interest, are today among the values of Czech modern art.) In 1964 she married the sculptor and printmaker Karel Nepraš. Their daughter Karolína Neprašová-Kračková is also an artist.

In 1968-1969 she completed a scholarship in Stuttgart and had an exhibition there with Jiří Balcar. Plíšková has returned to Czechoslovakia occupied by the Warsaw Pact troops. She was offered another scholarship by the Ford Foundation in November 1969, but was not allowed to go to the United States. After the birth of her daughter (1975) and with limited opportunity to exhibit, she devoted herself mainly to ex libris and writing poetry for samizdat editions. During normalisation she had only a few exhibitions in small unofficial galleries.

In 1982 she suffered a serious spinal cord injury, underwent surgery and a long convalescence. After returning from the hospital, in the suffocating atmosphere of the Husák normalization, she almost resigned to her own work. In 1983, she wrote to Jindřich Chalupecký: "If you only knew how hard it is to get used to the fact that nobody counts on you anymore, and to watch averages, diligent averages, exhibiting, scheming and going merrily on".

Plíšková has been a member of the Association of Czech Graphic Artists Hollar since 1969. After the fall of the communist regime in 1989, she was a founding member of the free association Tolerance, but her artistic and literary work is clearly marked by her unhappy personal fate until the late 1990s. (Note: How to make a marriage:/ marry twenty-four years/ buy a cookbook/ learn to cook/ learn to understand/ learn to forgive/ and most importantly:/ learn to wait/ wait for everything:/ for a flat/ for a man/ for money/ for coal/ for a plumber/ for the 1st divorce stall, in: Jan H. Vitvar, How to make a marriage, Respekt, 9. 8. 2019) She died in Prague on 16 September 1999.

== Work ==
=== Literary work and illustrations ===
She published her poems and prose from the late 1950s and then especially in the 1970s in samizdat publications - Czech Expedition, Spektrum, Vokno, Revolver Revue, Lidové noviny, etc. The poetry collection Thirteen Poems (1982) was also published in samizdat. She is listed in the Toronto Dictionary of Czech Writers (1982).

Some of these texts are included in the collection Plíšková by alphabet (1991). Poems and prose stylised as overheard monologues and restaurant speeches make up the book Pub Romanticism (1998). The poems collected in the volume Plíšková to Herself (2000) are mostly reflections on personal relationships, from motherhood and friends' parties to an increasingly strong perception of the loss of love, cruel loneliness, and reflections on the end of life. The posthumously published book contains works from 1997 to 1999, some texts not included in other publications and, in the editorial notes, a transcription of letters to Jindřich Chalupecký.

A commentary on some of the author's life milestones is her interview with Andrej Stankovič in Revolver Revue No. 47 of 2001, which was published posthumously at her request. (Note: When God says enough, I'd like to be home in bed... (Nikolaj Stankovič talks to Nadia Plíšková, February 1998), Revolver Revue No. 47, 2001, pp. 205–218)

==== Quote ====
Naděžda Plíšková: S U N should shine more at night, there is enough light in the day-time anyway

==== Bibliography ====
- Naděžda Plíšková: Plíšková by alphabet, Prologue by Jan Lopatka, Edition of Writing Artists, vol. 1, 121 p., Dandy Club, Prague 1991, ISBN 80-900352-4-8
- Naděžda Plíšková, Pub Romanticism, New Line Edition, vol. 21, 83 p., Petrov, Brno 1998, ISBN 80-7227-034-6
- Naděžda Plíšková: Plíšková to herself, Poetry edition, vol. 46, 253 p., Torst, Prague 2000, ISBN 80-7215-114-2

==== Illustrations ====
- Klement Bochořák, Poems for big children, drawing on the cover, frontispiece by Naděžda Plíšková, Edition Czech Poems, vol. 233, Prague 1964
- Michal Černík, A Life Deciphered, illustration: Naděžda Plíšková, Edition Czech Poems, Prague 1987
- Petr Kovařík, Don't talk to me when I shave, illustration: Naděžda Plíšková, Mladá fronta, Prague 1990. ISBN 80-204-0168-7

=== Prints and drawings ===
Naděžda Plíšková already attracted attention with her bravura drawings and graphic sheets at group exhibitions of young artists in the early 1960s. Her work is still relevant today, although the subjects of her best-known works reflect the state of society before 1970. They show her penetrating intelligence, her lively sense of humour and sharp irony, as well as expressing the absurdity of specific life situations.

In her first drawings, she still refers to informel and the legacy of surrealism (Couple, 1963, The Jealous Beetle, 1966), but gradually concentrates on ironic reflection on contemporary themes (On the Subject of Caesar's Thumb, 1970). Her work from the 1960s was permeated by the invention, hope and perhaps even naivety of a decade that has fundamentally influenced everything that has happened in art since.

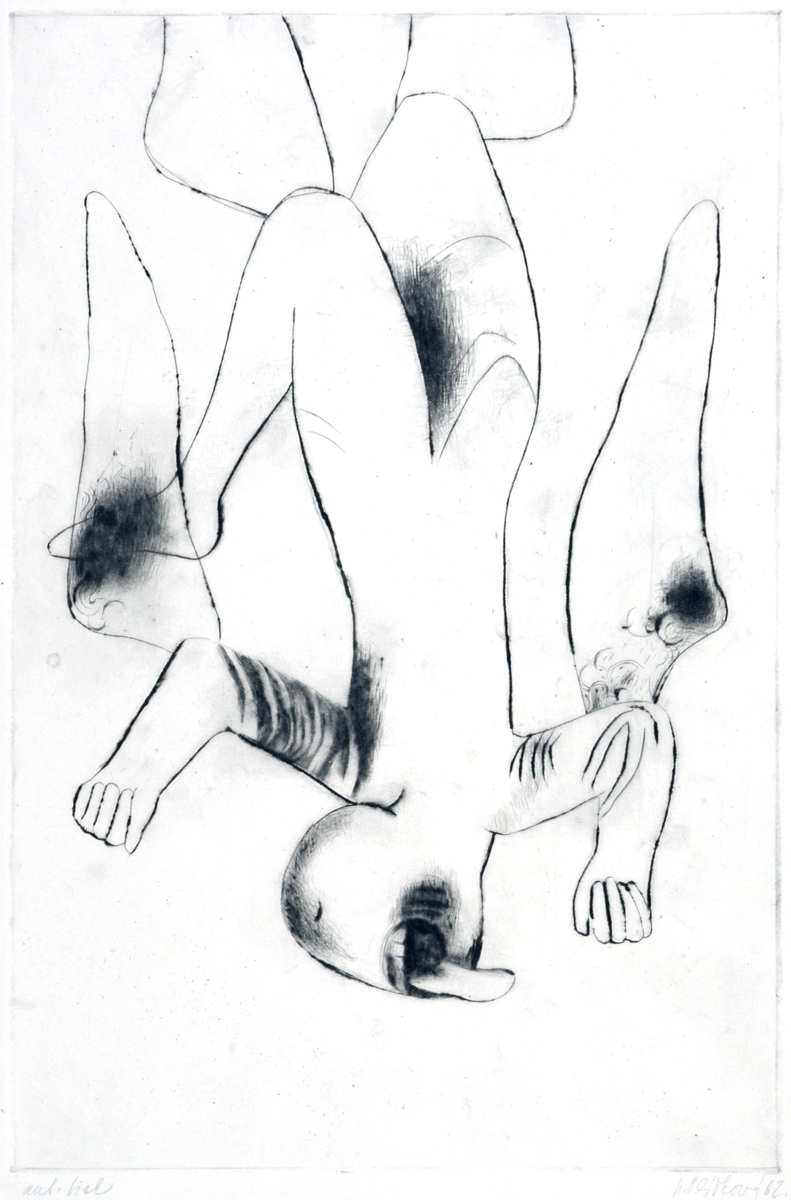
The Fall of Icarus'', 1962

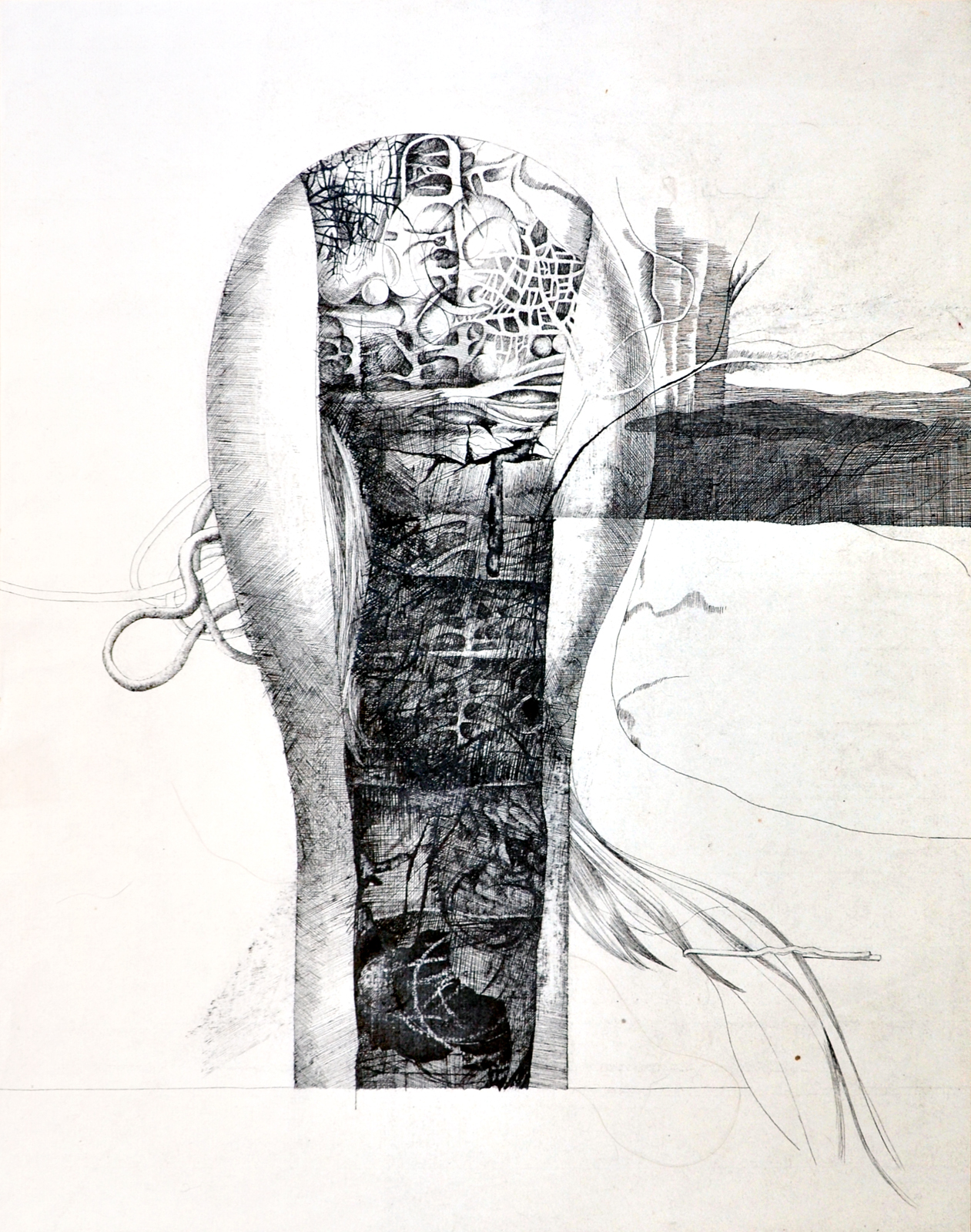
No title (Head), 1960s

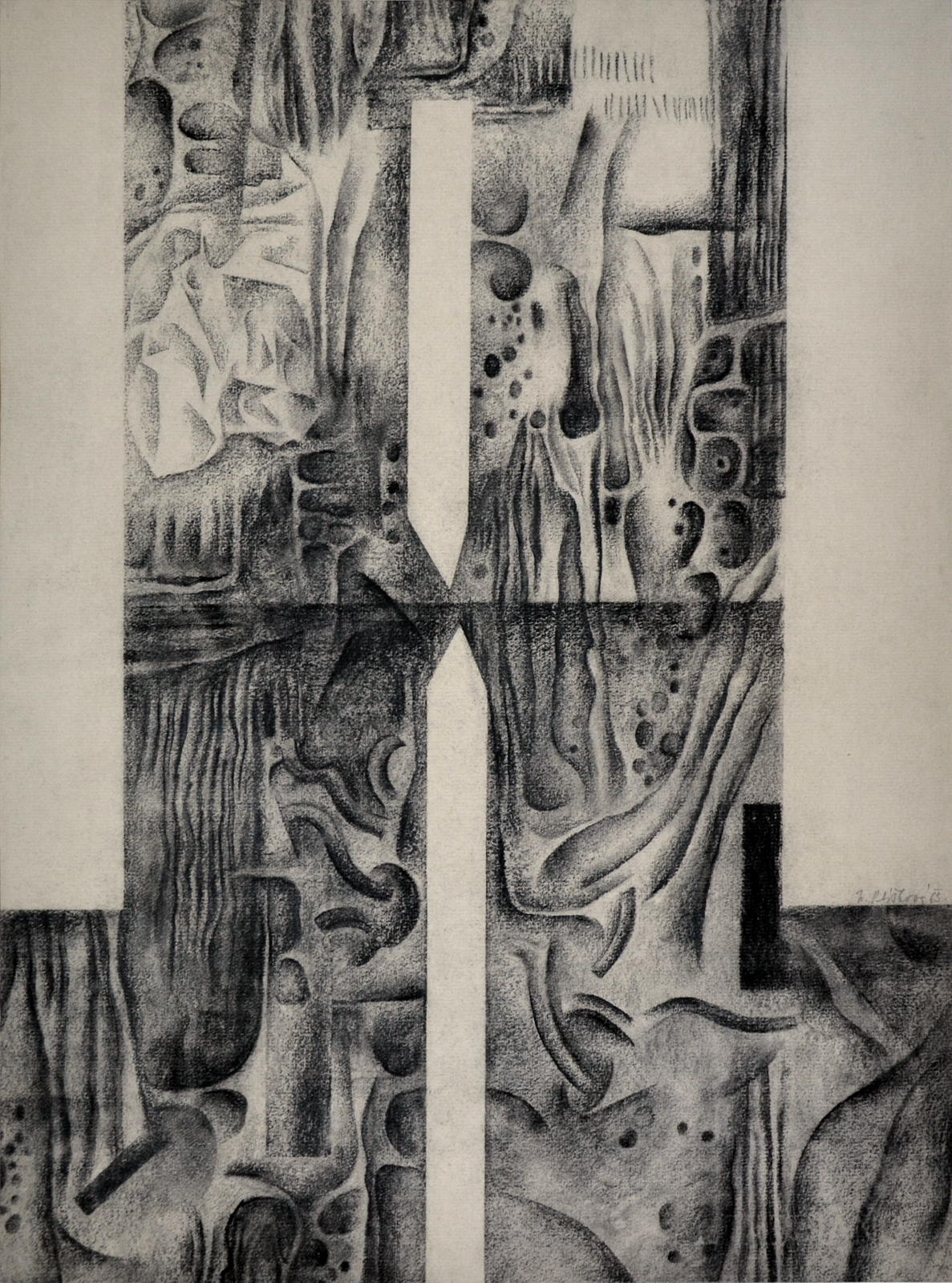
Couple, 1963

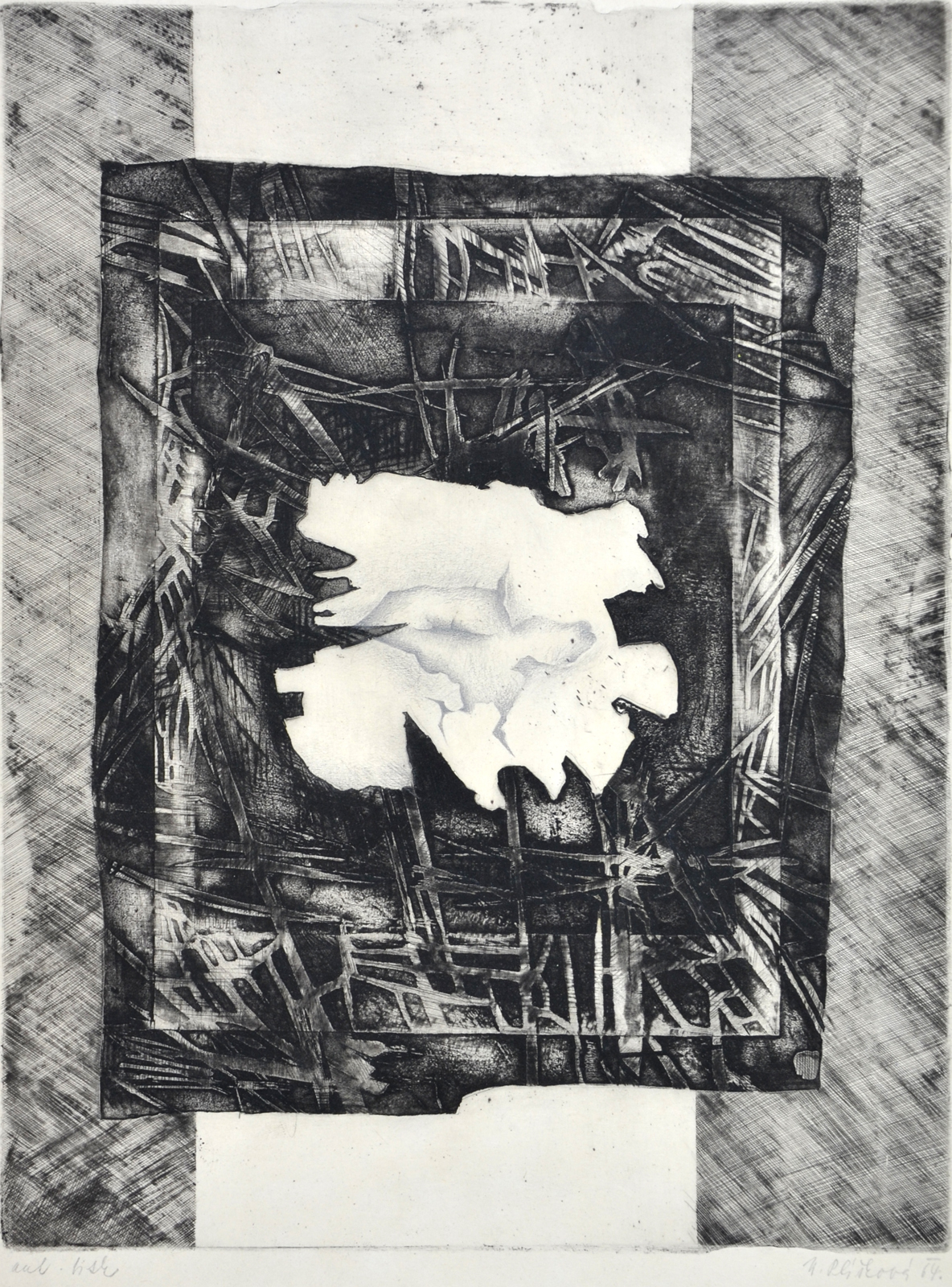
Study I, 1964

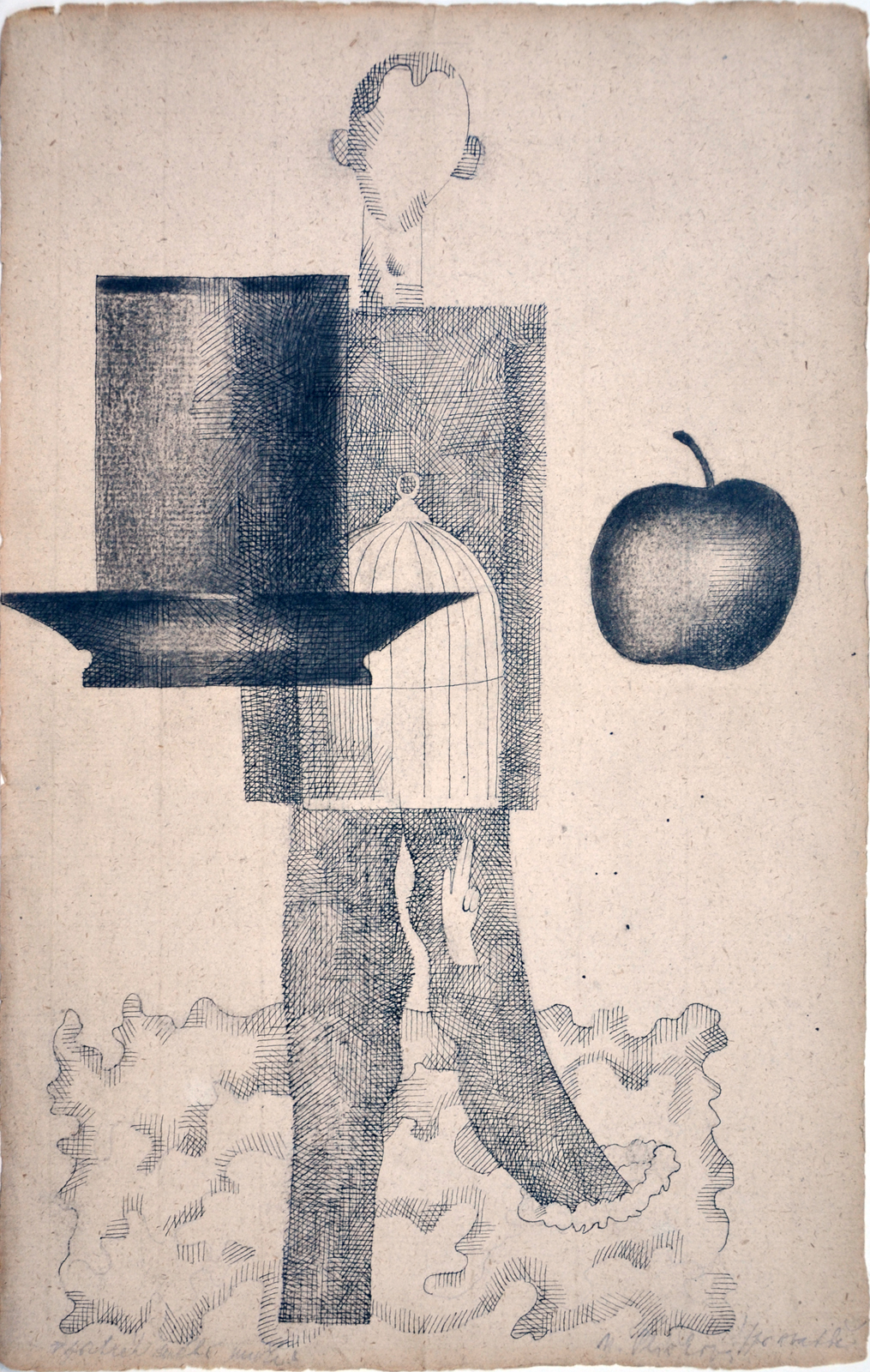
Portrait of my husband (after marriage), ink drawing, 37x23 cm, 1964

Naďa Plíšková could probably be described as a successor to the Dadaists. Her graphic works have their own order, which is, however, prompted by the strange rules governing an absurd world where everything is turned upside down (Me, 1970). With her artistic virtuosity, she was able to elevate even banal subjects to a work of art and at the same time relativise the work itself by challenging its destruction (Little Erotic Box, 1973). She had an amazing imagination, with which she was able to react with light exaggeration to the unquestionable values of the past (Mona Lisa, 1968; The Memory of Botticelli, 1968; Hieronymus Bosch's Dice, 1973) and to relativise everyday situations (Triptych, 1967). Plíšková reflected her position as a woman in the predominantly patriarchal society of banned artists and the underground in an original way, e.g. with sarcastic designs from the 1990s for her monument, or a graphic commentary on the promoted ideal of the perfect young female body (Re-stitching, 1968).

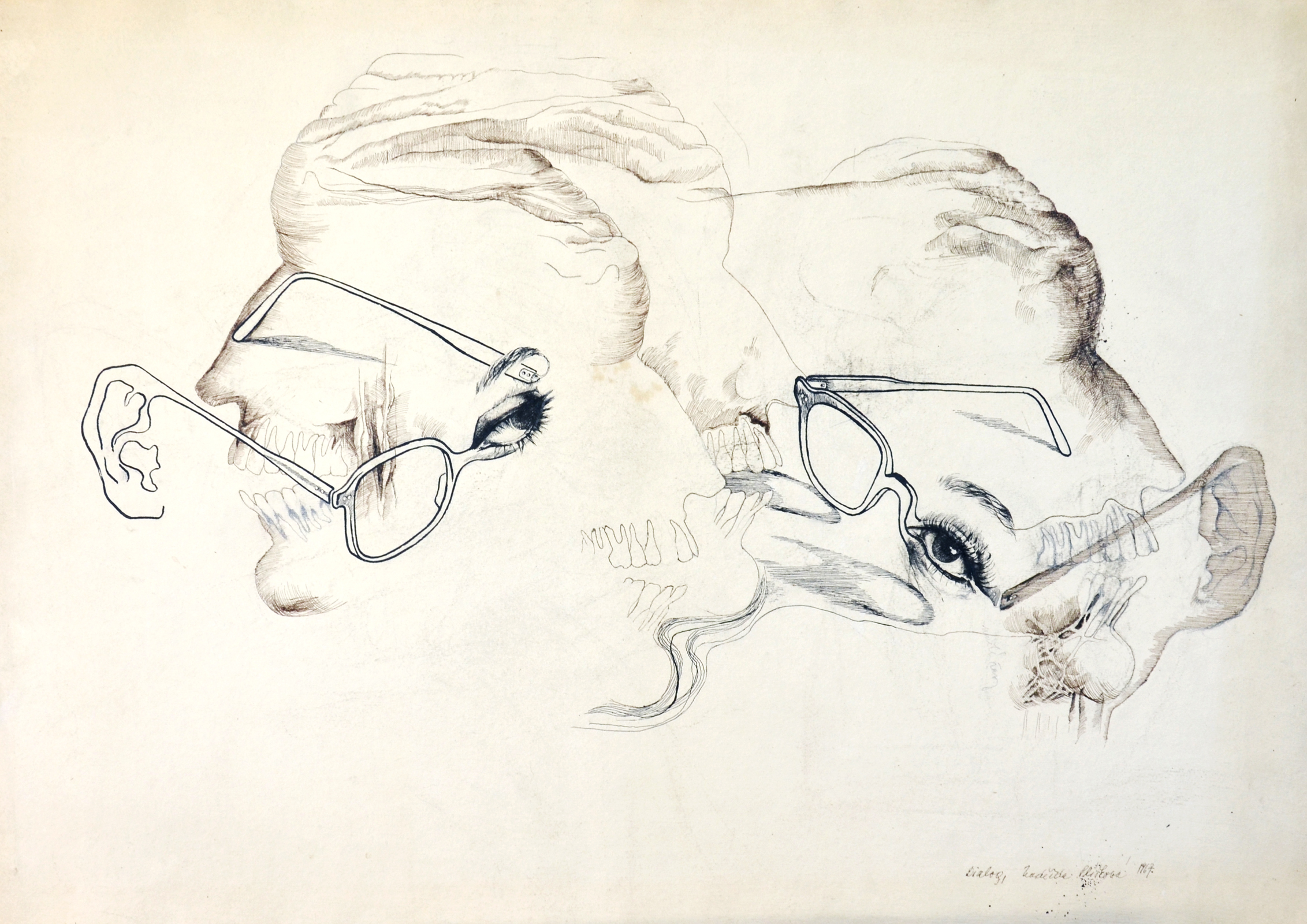
Dialogue, ink drawing, 42x59 cm, 1967

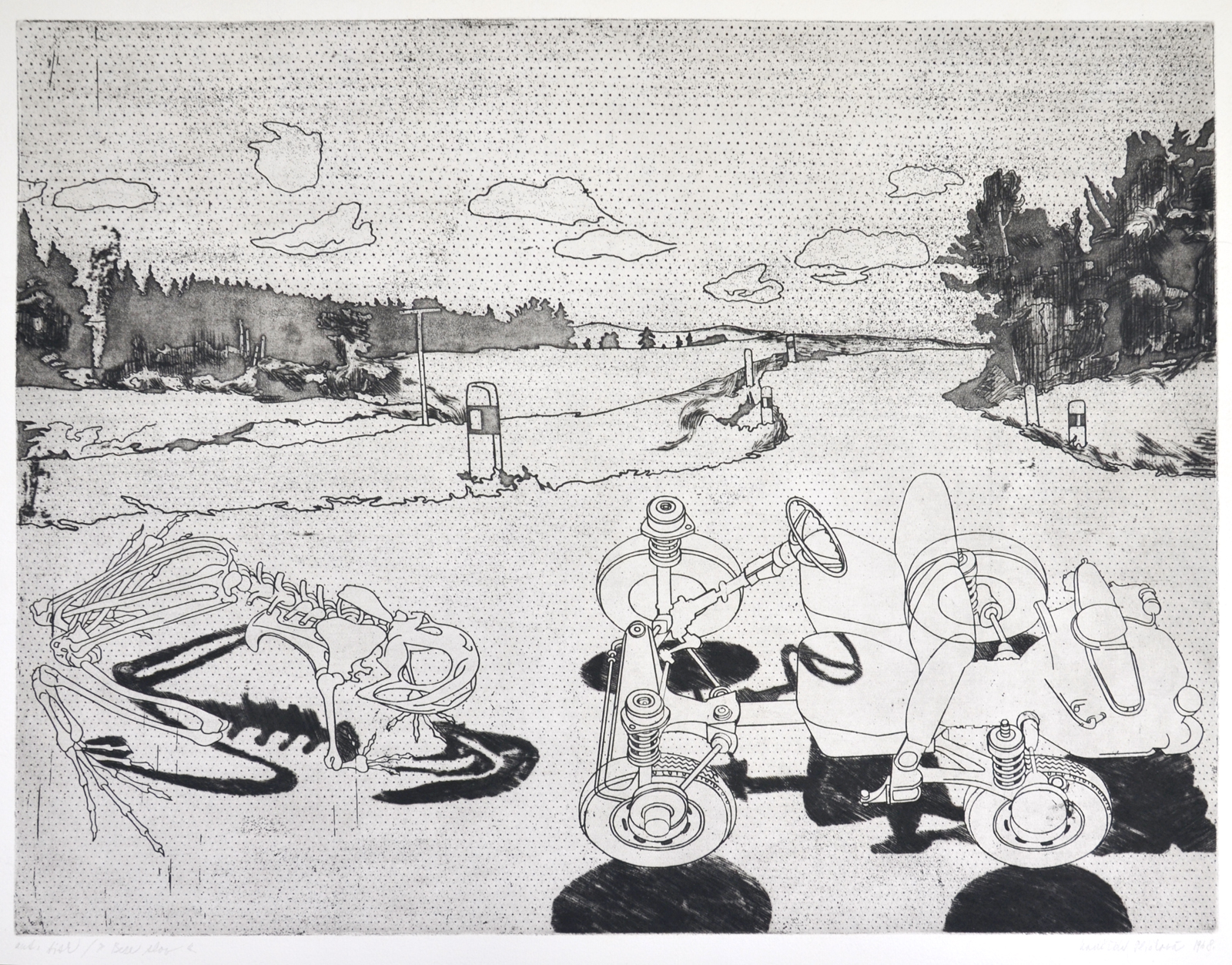
No comment, 1968

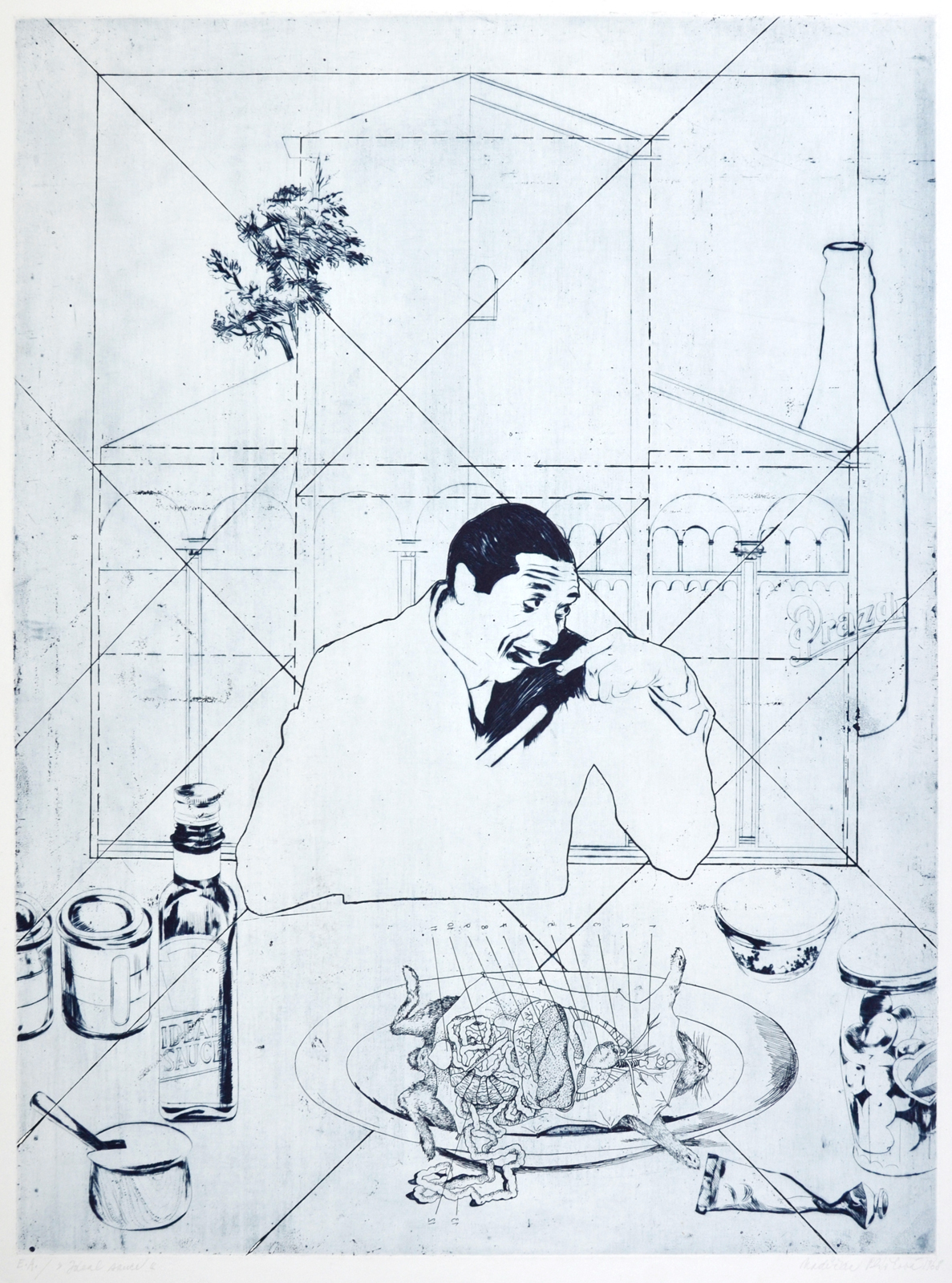
Ideal Sauce, 1968

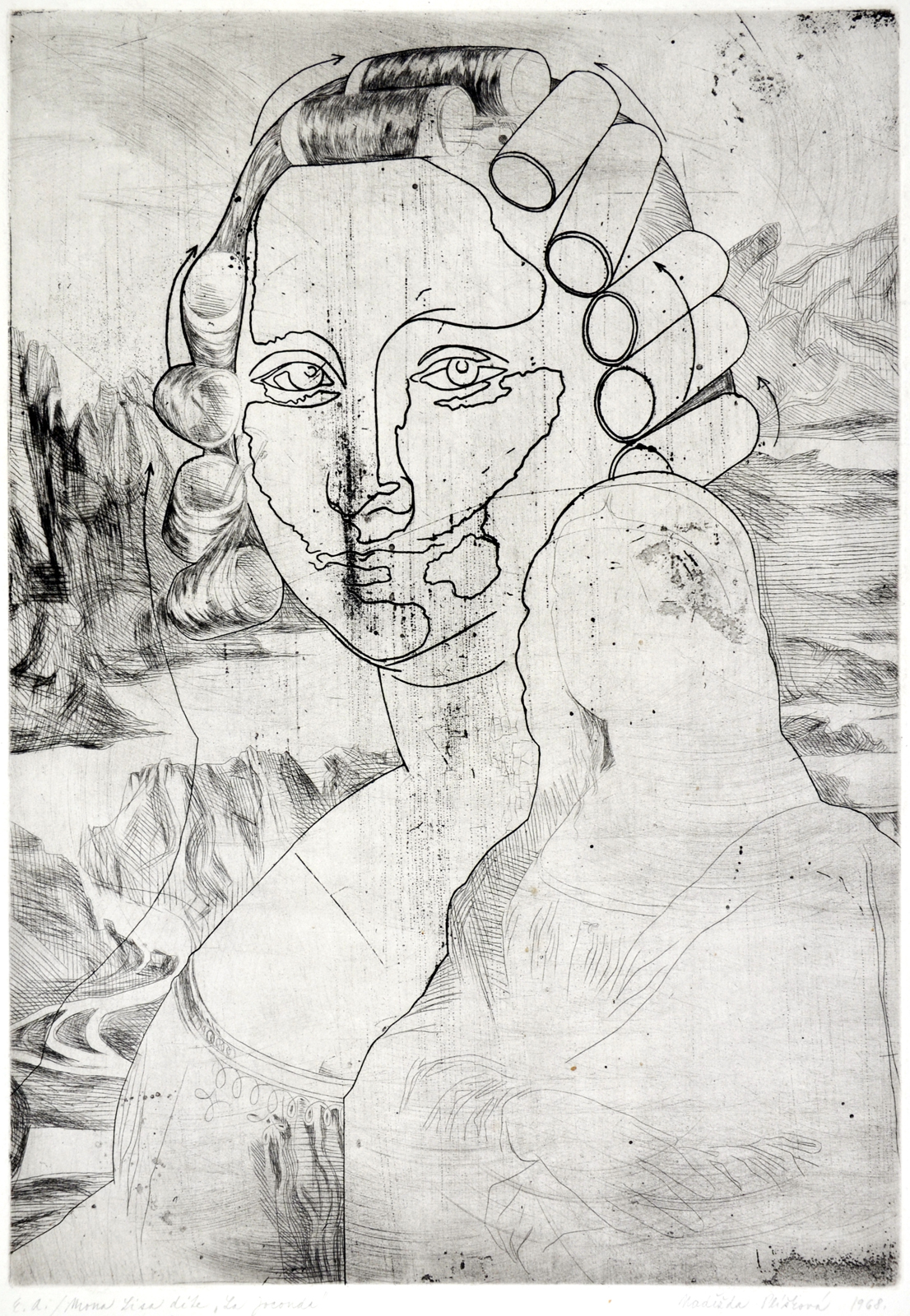
Mona Lisa, dite La Joconda, 1968

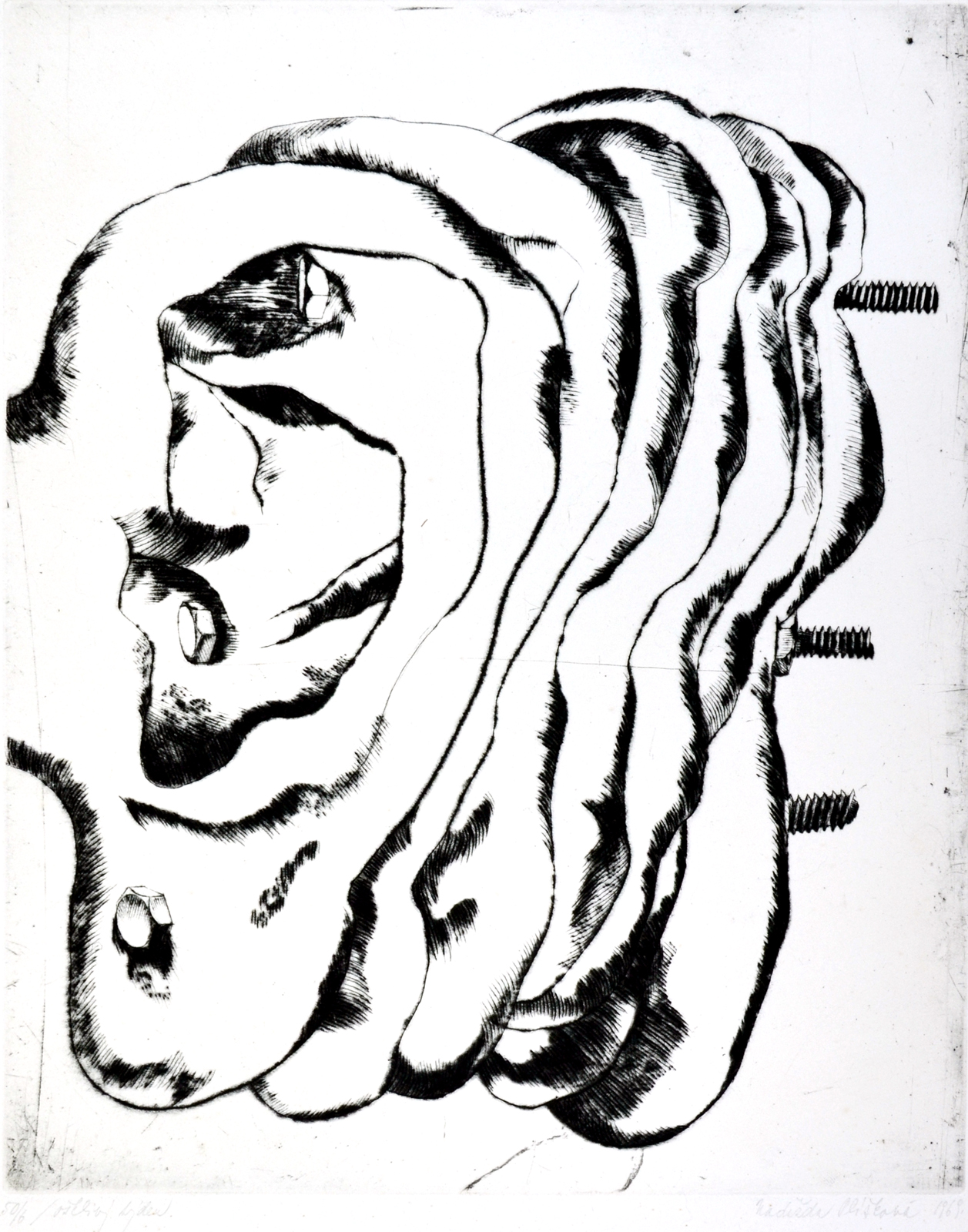
Ugly Week, 1969

The mundane situations she observed and explored with analytical detachment may be reminiscent of Western European or American pop art (Ideal Sauce, 1968; Study for a Painting, 1968), with which she has been compared by most Czech and foreign critics. Plíšková created a distinctive variety of pop art without sticking to any paradigm. However, she created its distinctive "European chamber equivalent", without adhering to any models. Had she lived in the Western world, she would probably have naturally aligned herself with artists who responded to the consumer lifestyle with a sharp criticality and at the same time with a distinct sense of expressing the absurd. However, she managed to do the same at least within the local art scene, where she could draw on an environment that was conducive to a distinctive form of Czech Dadaism Czech Dadaism (4 servings of tripe soup across the street, 1969; Proposal for a monument to Karel Nepraš, 1979)

Rather than consumerism, Plíšková thematised Czech beer culture (10 Gentlemen and 1 Lady, 1971) and portrayed symbols of socialist everyday life, marked by limited supply. She also ironised the proclaimed social security and a certain standard of living offered to citizens by the normalisation regime in exchange for their resignation to dealing with public affairs (Knedlík základ rodiny / Dumpling the basis of the family, 1982). According to Petr Rezek, Plíšková's work cannot be placed in the context of Pop Art, because its level of criticality and irony contradicts this classification.

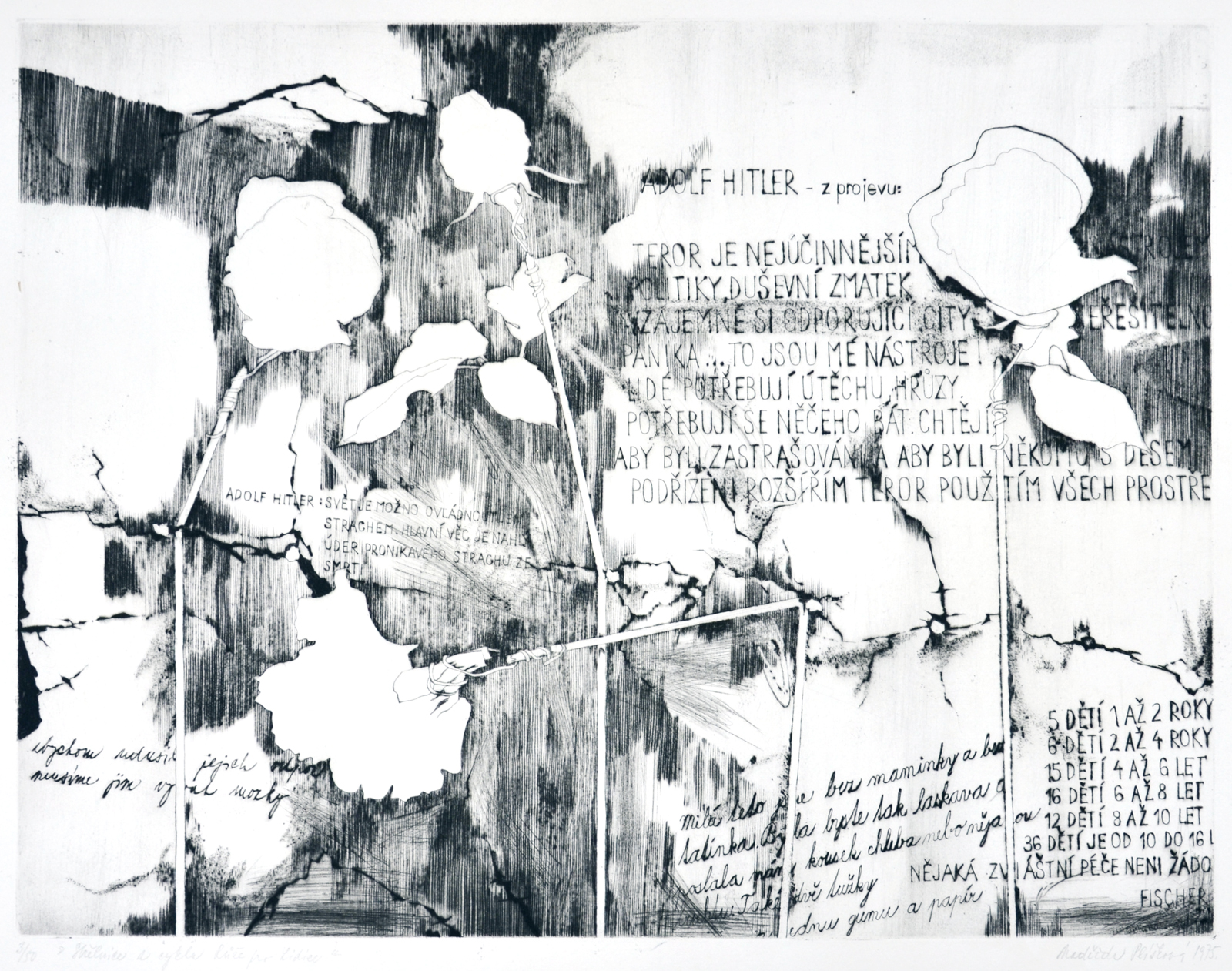
Shooting range (From the series Roses for Lidice), drypoint, 39×49,5 cm, 1975

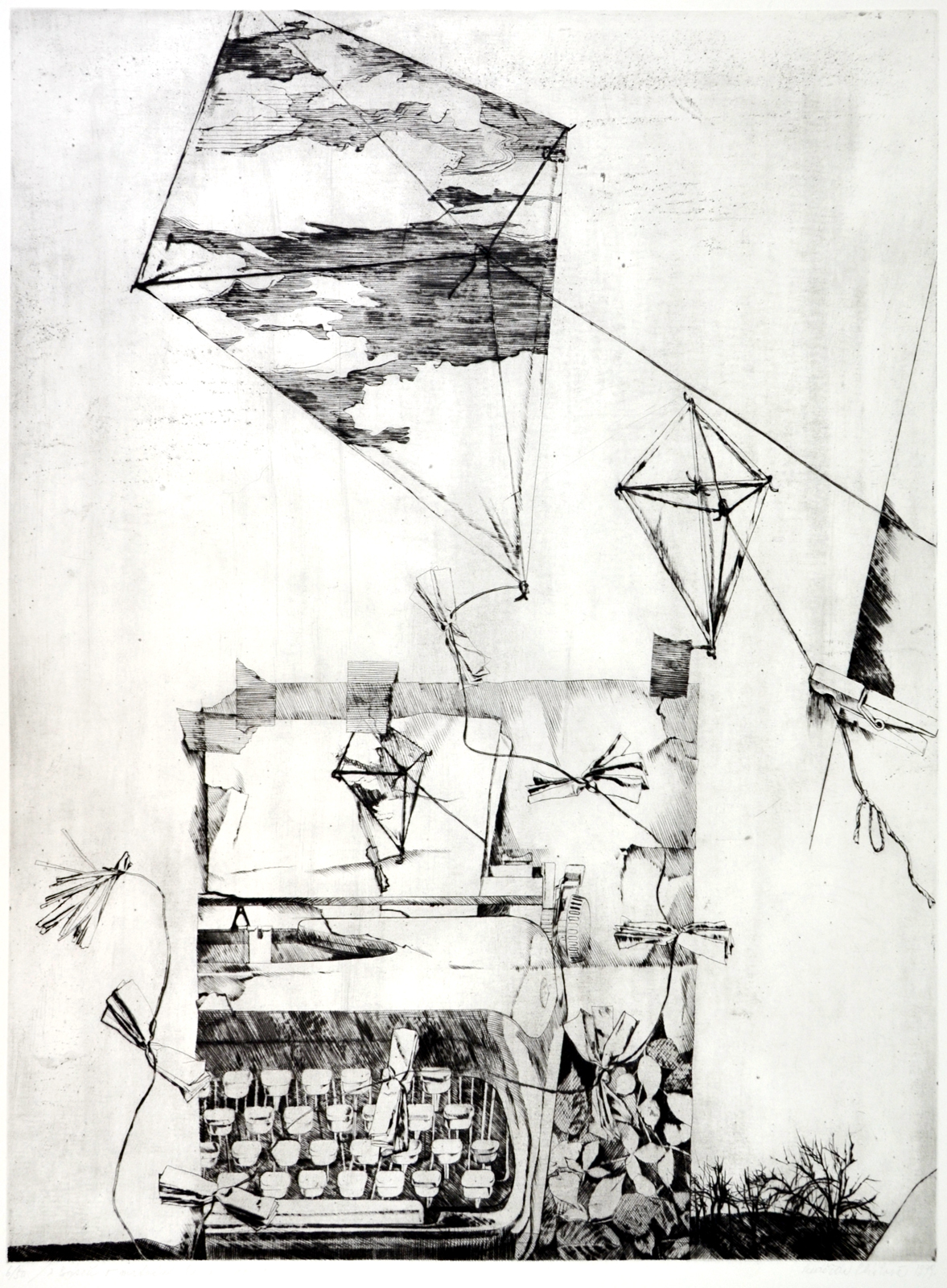
Poem about a Dead Friend, drypoint, 65 x 49.5 cm, 1979

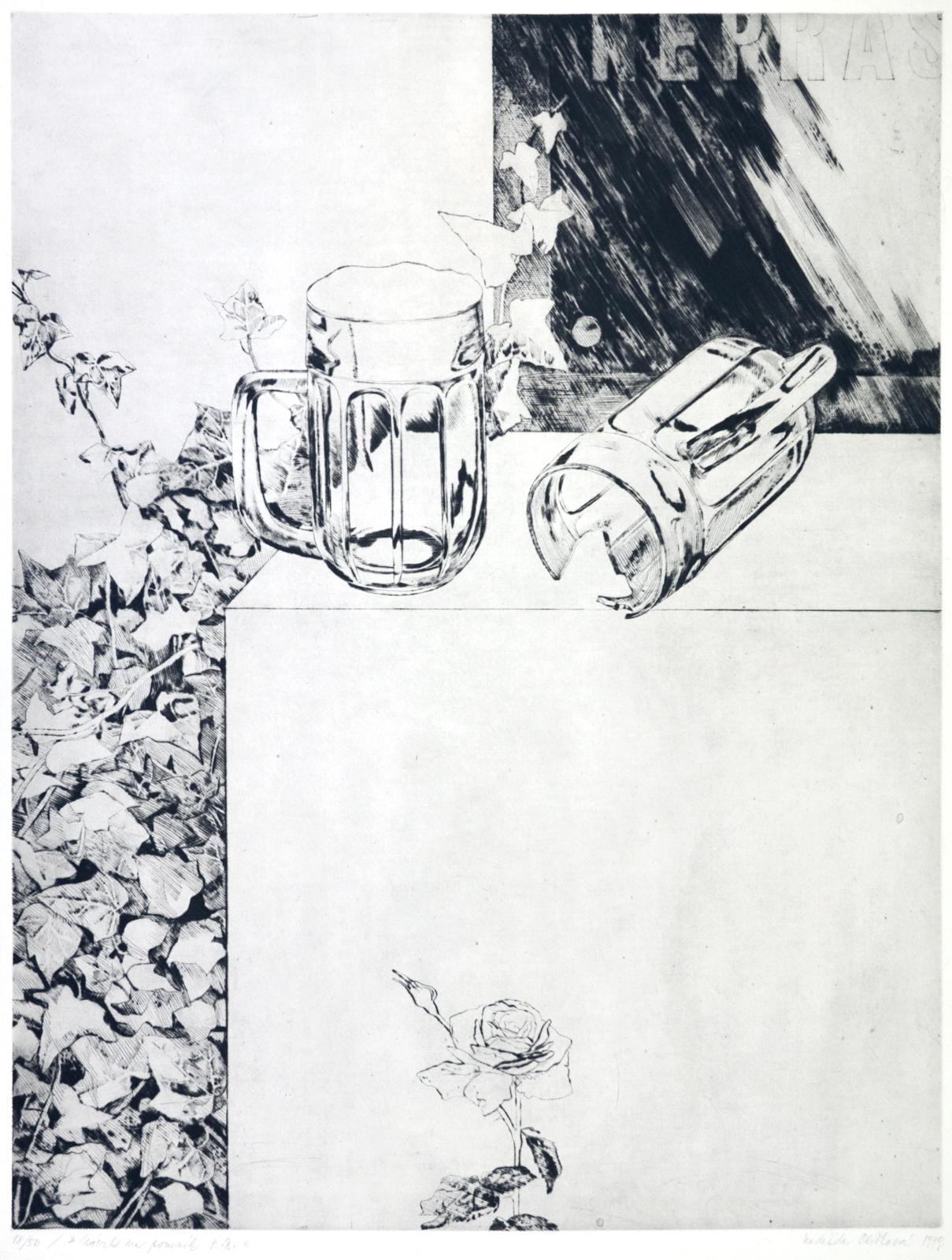
Proposal for a monument to Karel Nepraš, drypoint, 64x50 cm, 1979

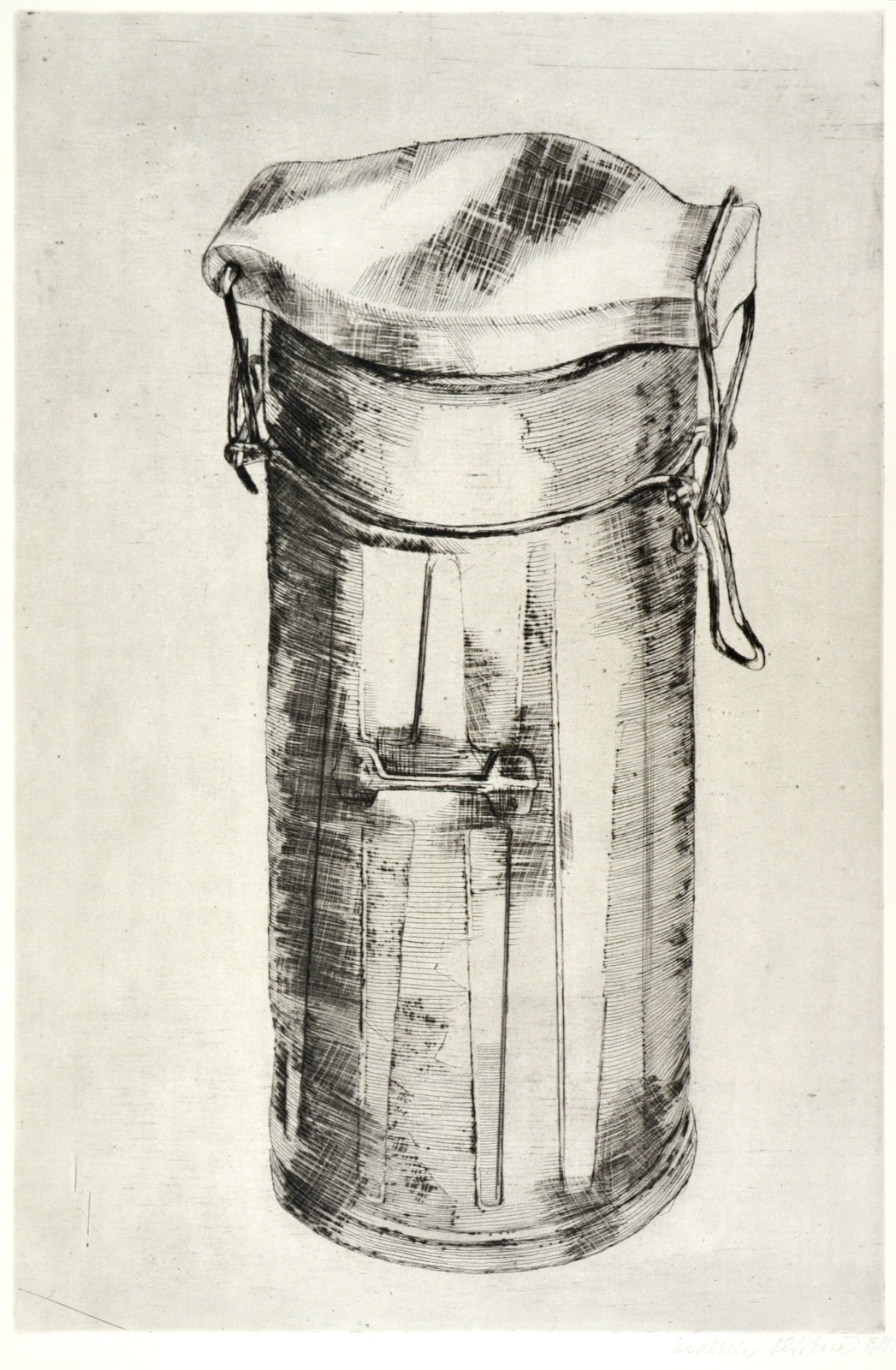
Untitled, drypoint, 49,5x32,5 cm, 1981, 1981

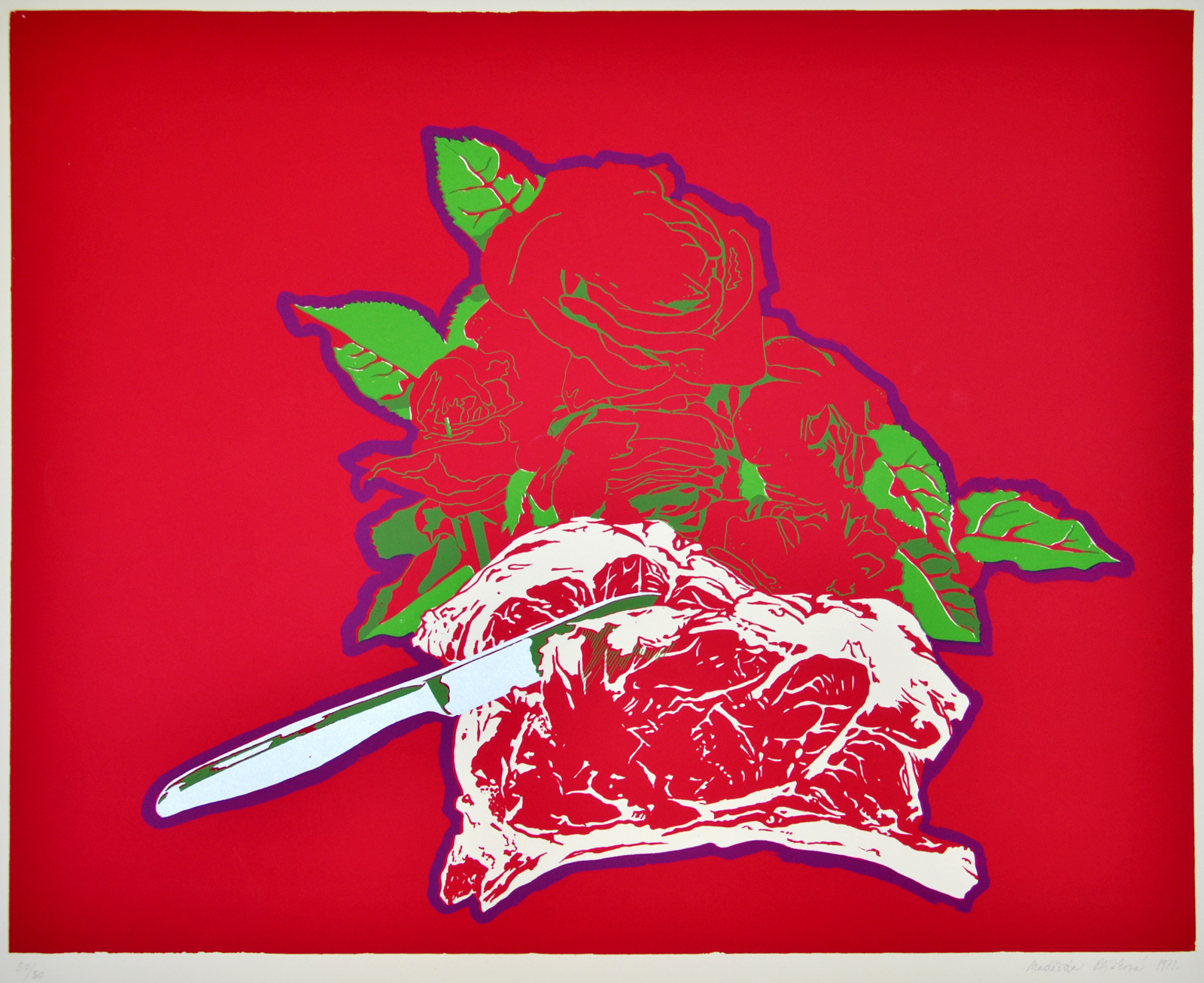
No title, colour lithography, 42x51,5 cm, 1971

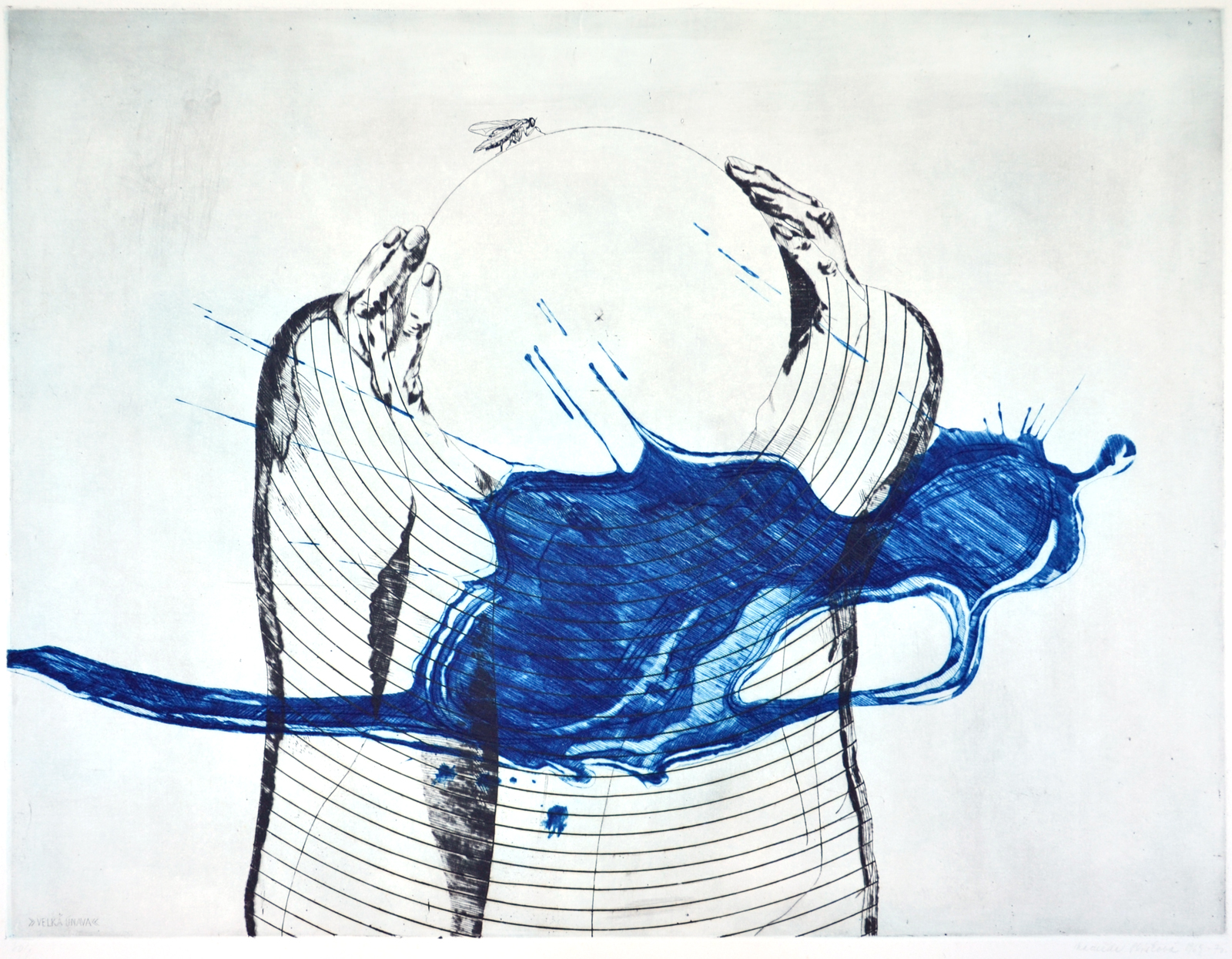
The Great Fatigue'', 1969–1970

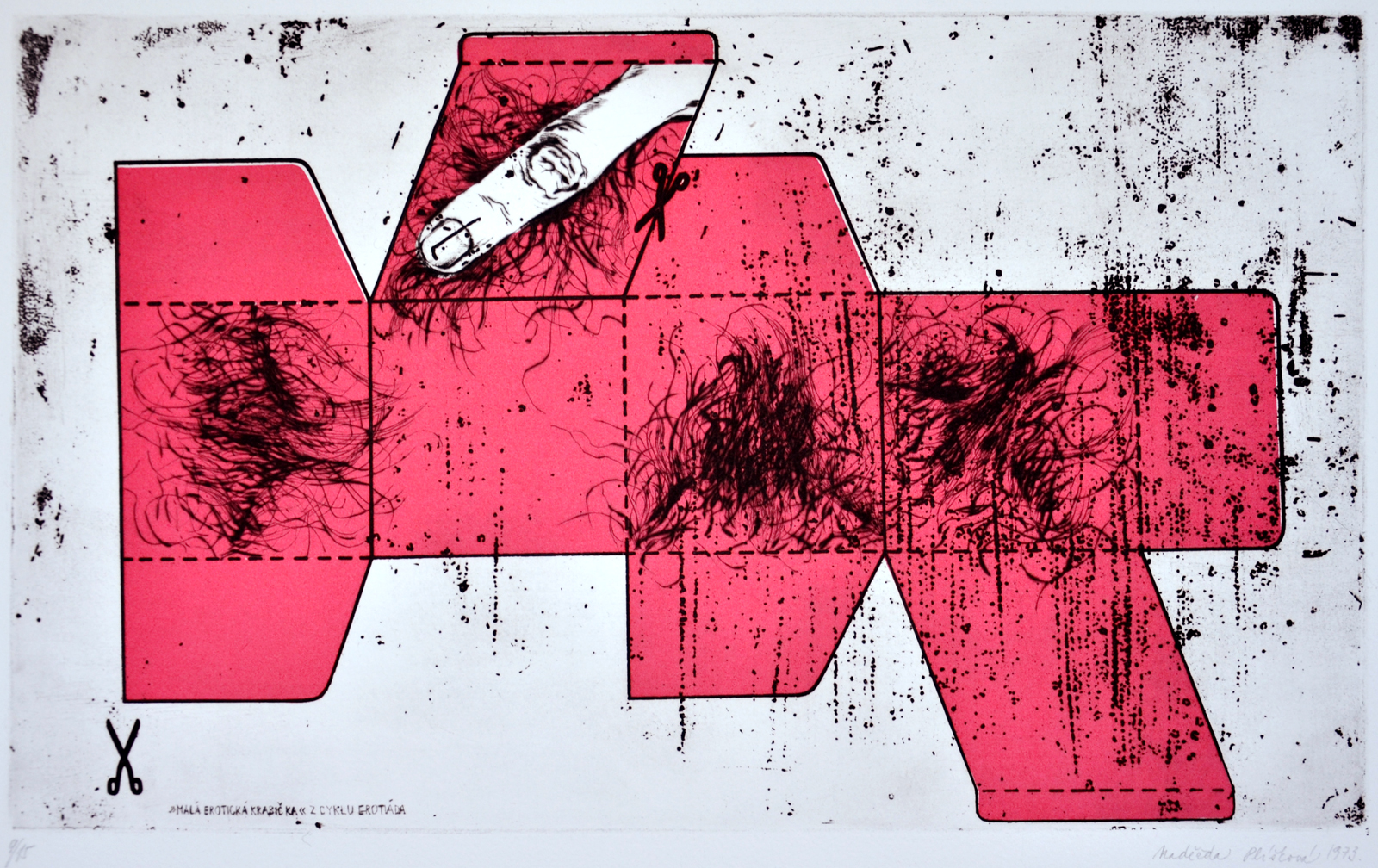
Small Erotic Box (From the Erotiada Series), 1973

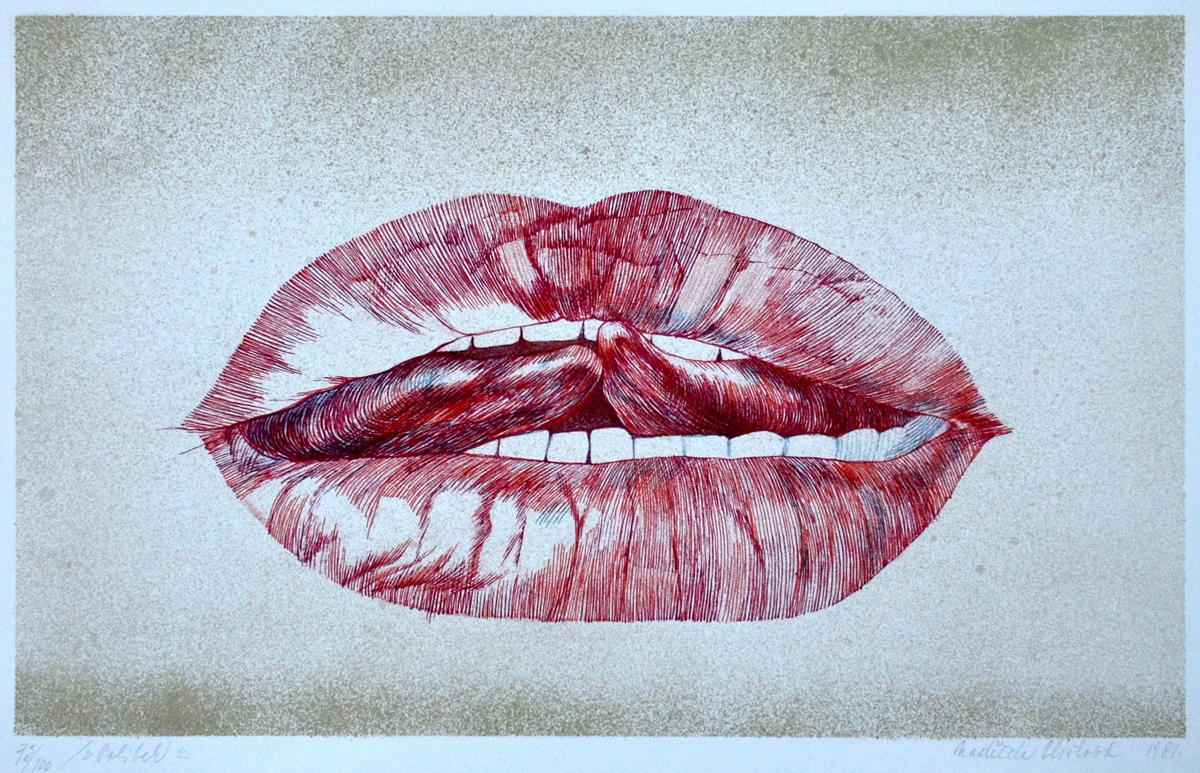
Kiss, combined technique, 1981

Naďa Plíšková worked in printmaking using traditional technical means (mostly drypoint and etching), but with an unconventional vision of reality. Jindřich Chalupecký describes her perception of reality as lyrical sarcasm. "Behind the sarcasm of her prints, all the more cruel because it is uttered with the impersonality of an objective protocol, there is a sensibility facing the barren banality of life." Plíšková exchanged letters with Chalupecký, but she did not accept his sometimes almost mentoring attitude towards her own work or his interpretation of Marcel Duchamp's work as an androgynous artist. In her graphic sheet, for example, she ironised Duchamp's ready-made "Fountain" as Hommage á Karel Nepraš (1989).

The same feeling of life is reflected in the objects in which she looks with detachment both at herself and at everything that was happening around her and that she had to cope with. At the time of the deepest social marasmus at the beginning of the 1980s, she created works full of bitter humour (Quadrangular Wheel, 1980; Beer Case, 1981), but by the early 1990s her work touches more and more on personal themes, and bitterness and loss of hope join the exaggeration in her texts and artworks (drawing At the Bottom, 1990; Monument for My Man, 1992; My Monument, 1997).

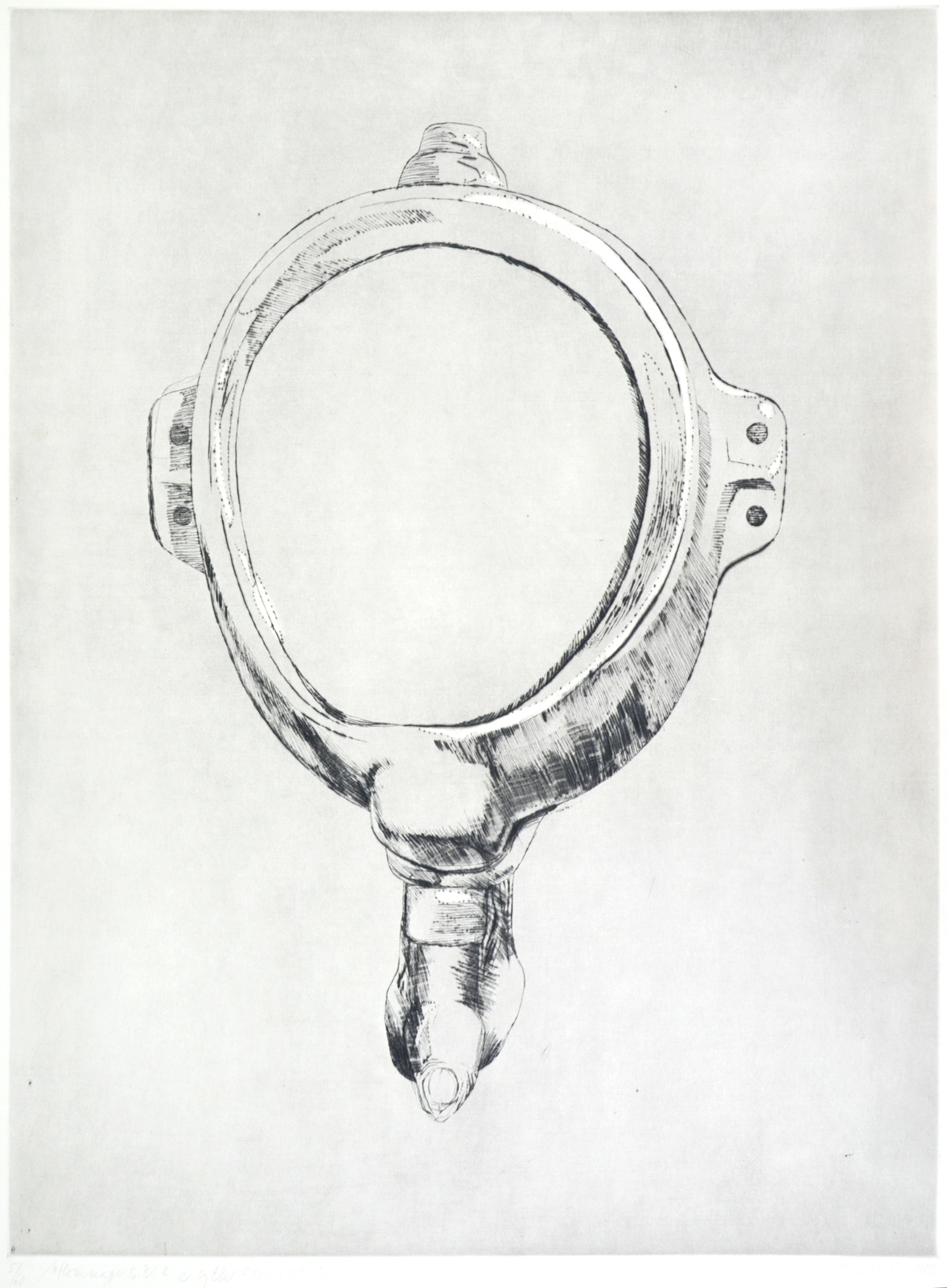
Hommage á K.N., From the Erotic year series, drypoint, 64,5x49,5 cm, 1989

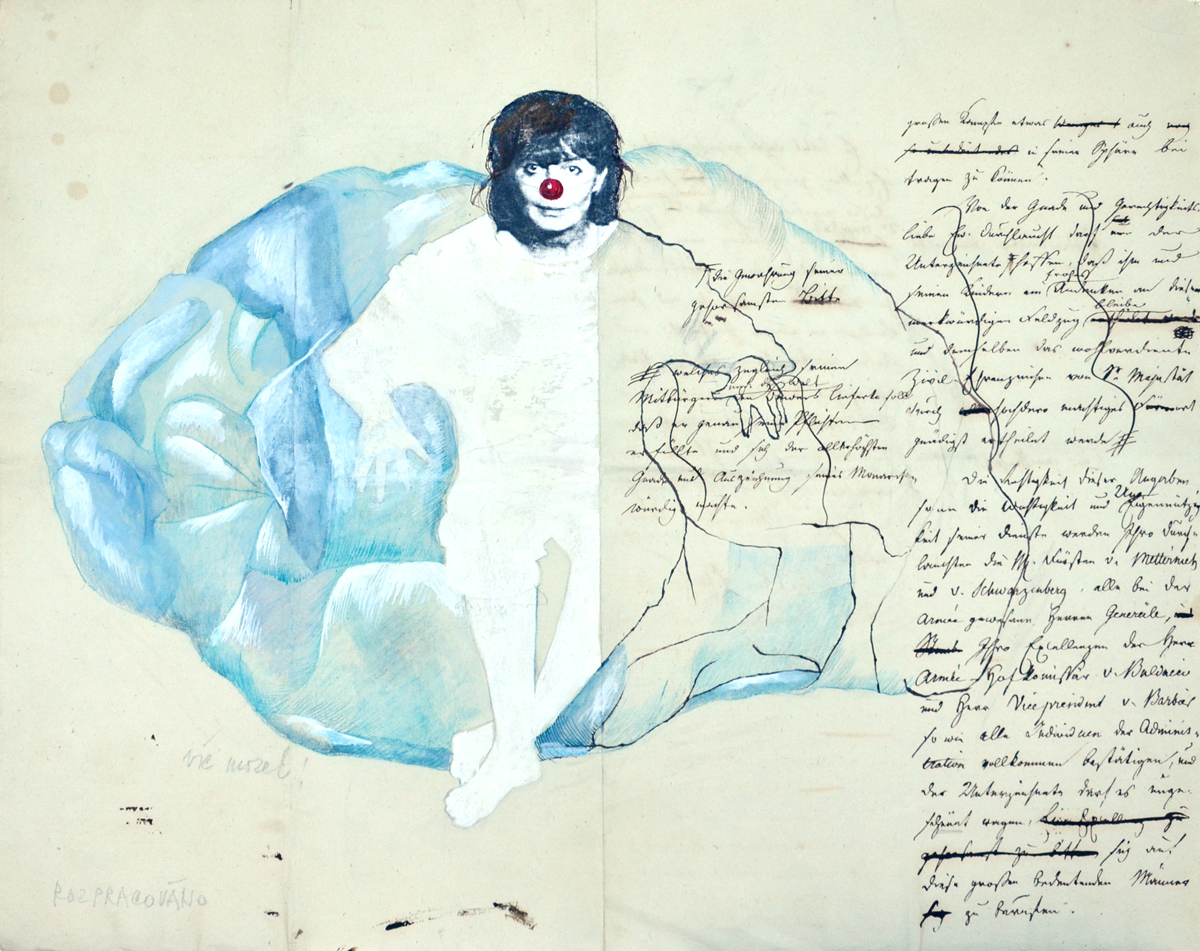
Drawing, 34x43 cm, 1980s

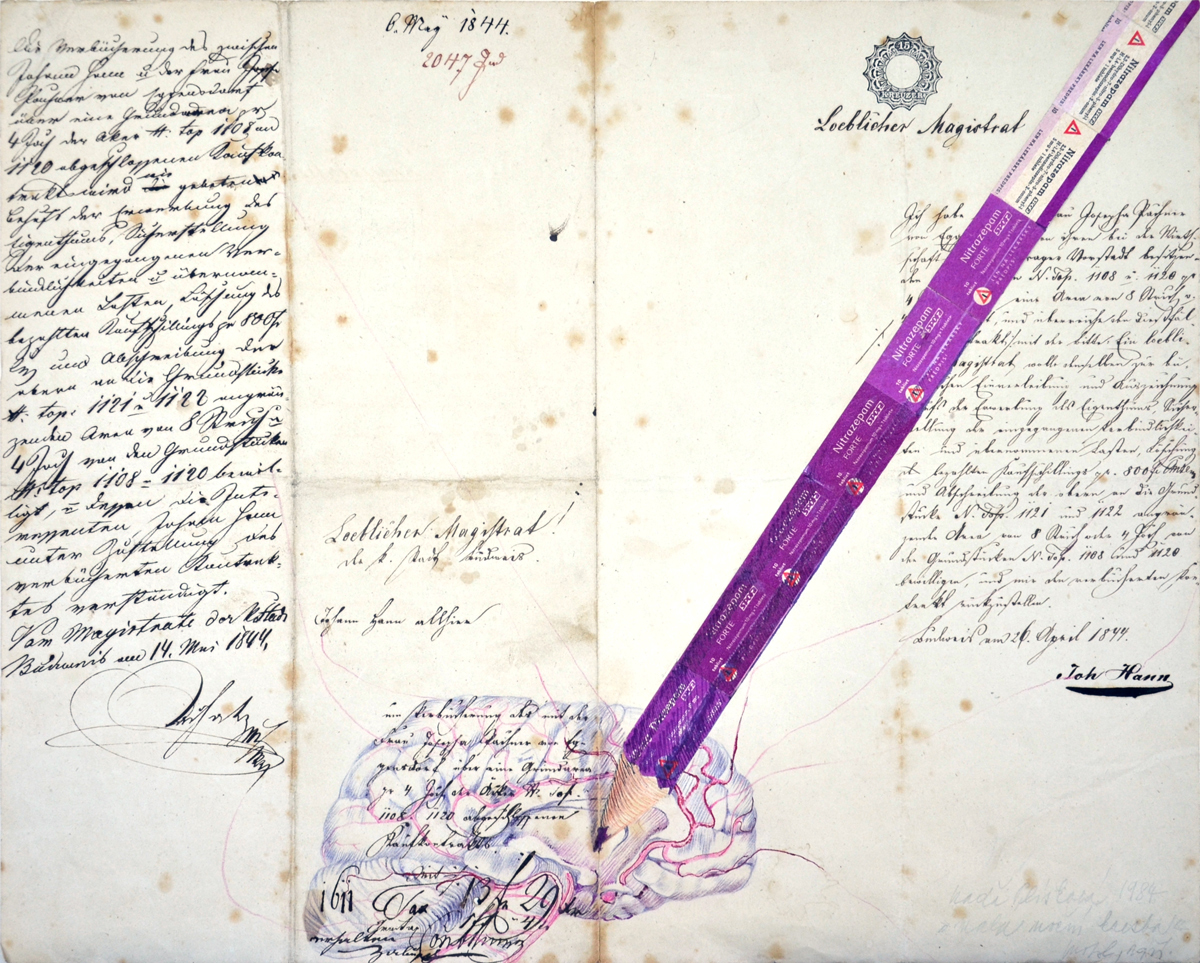
Small Night Drawing, drawing with collage, 34x42 cm, 1984

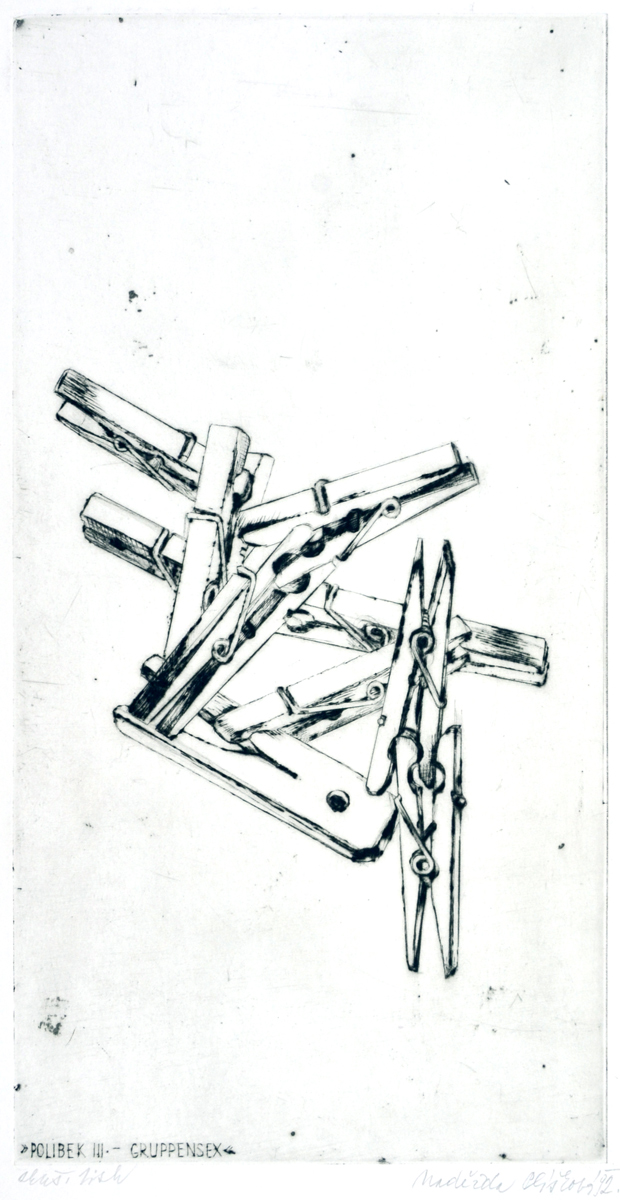
Kiss III Gruppensex, drypoint, 34x17,5 cm, 1992,

==== School drawings and early works ====
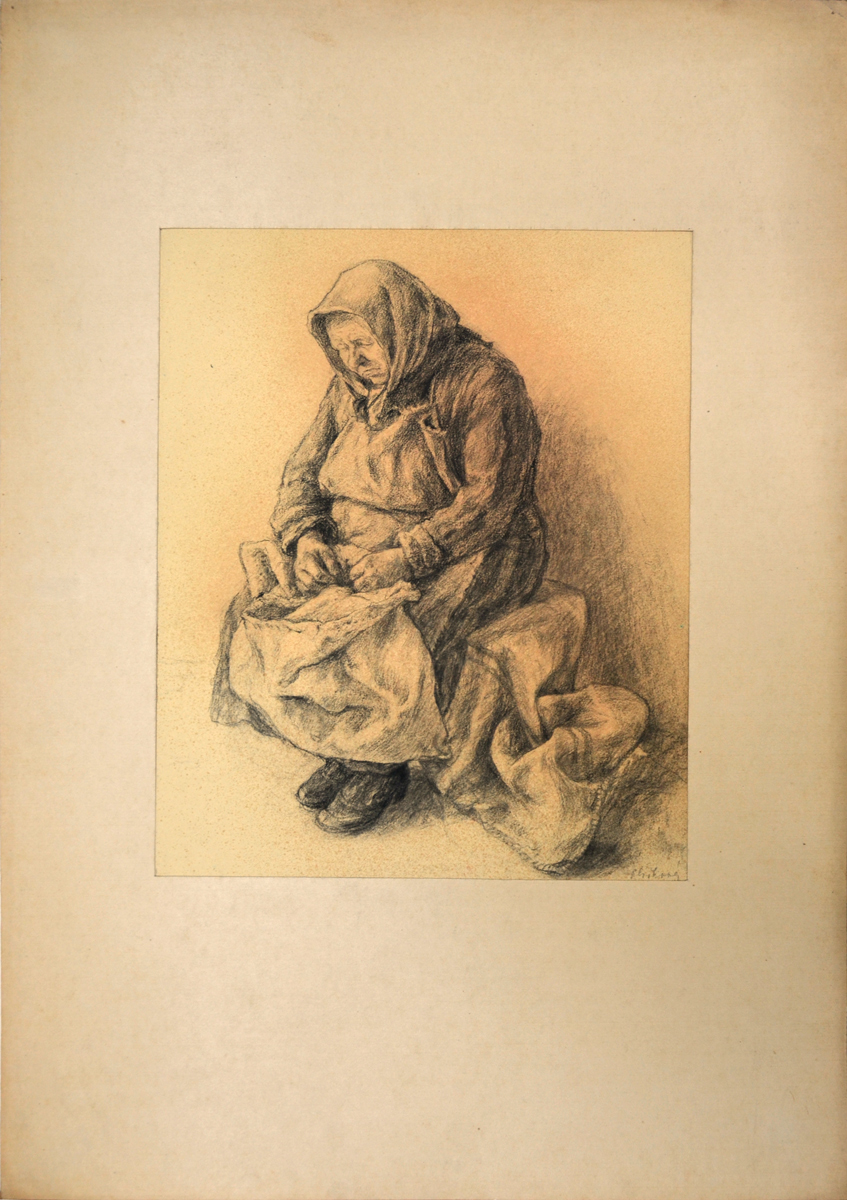
Study of an old woman, pencil drawing, undated.jpg

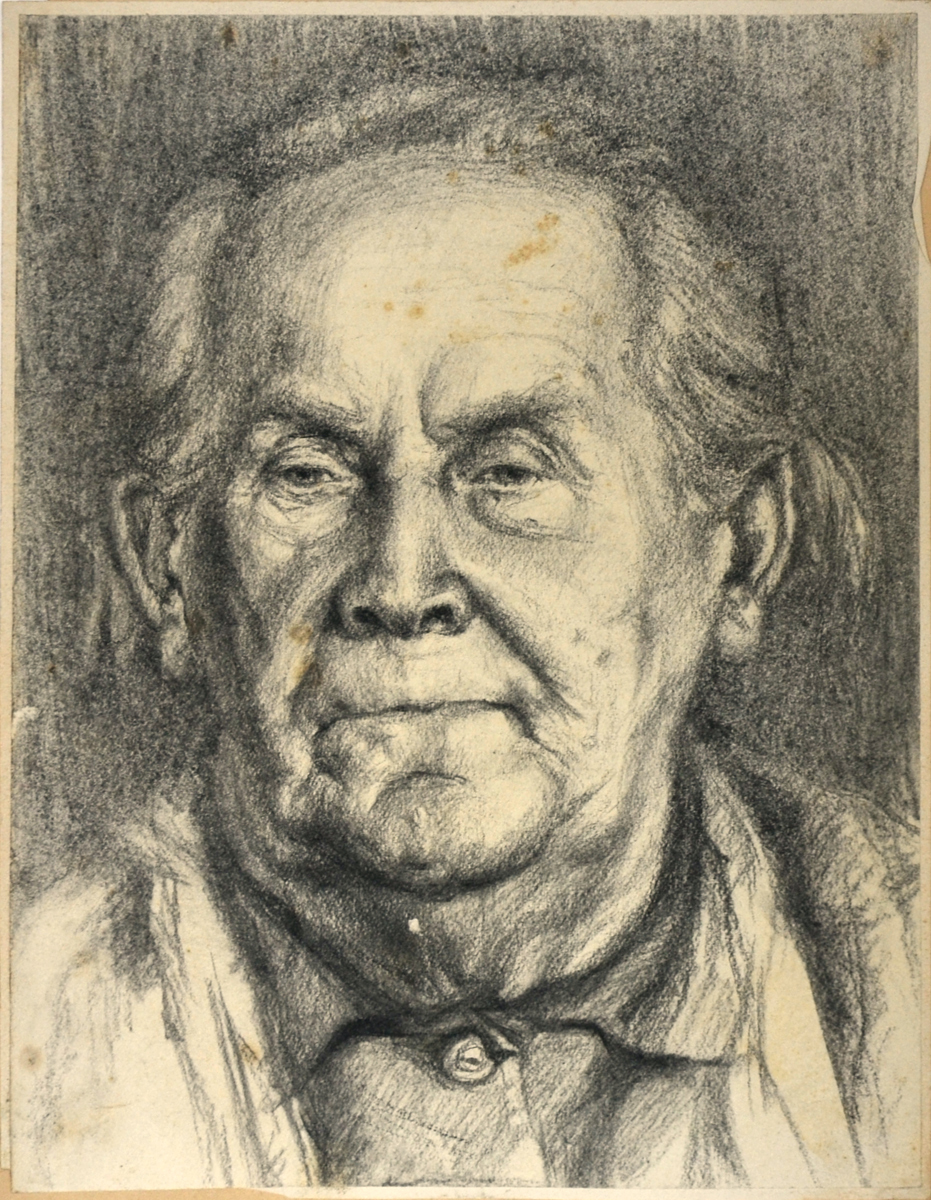
Portrait (4), study, charcoal drawing, undated., nedatováno

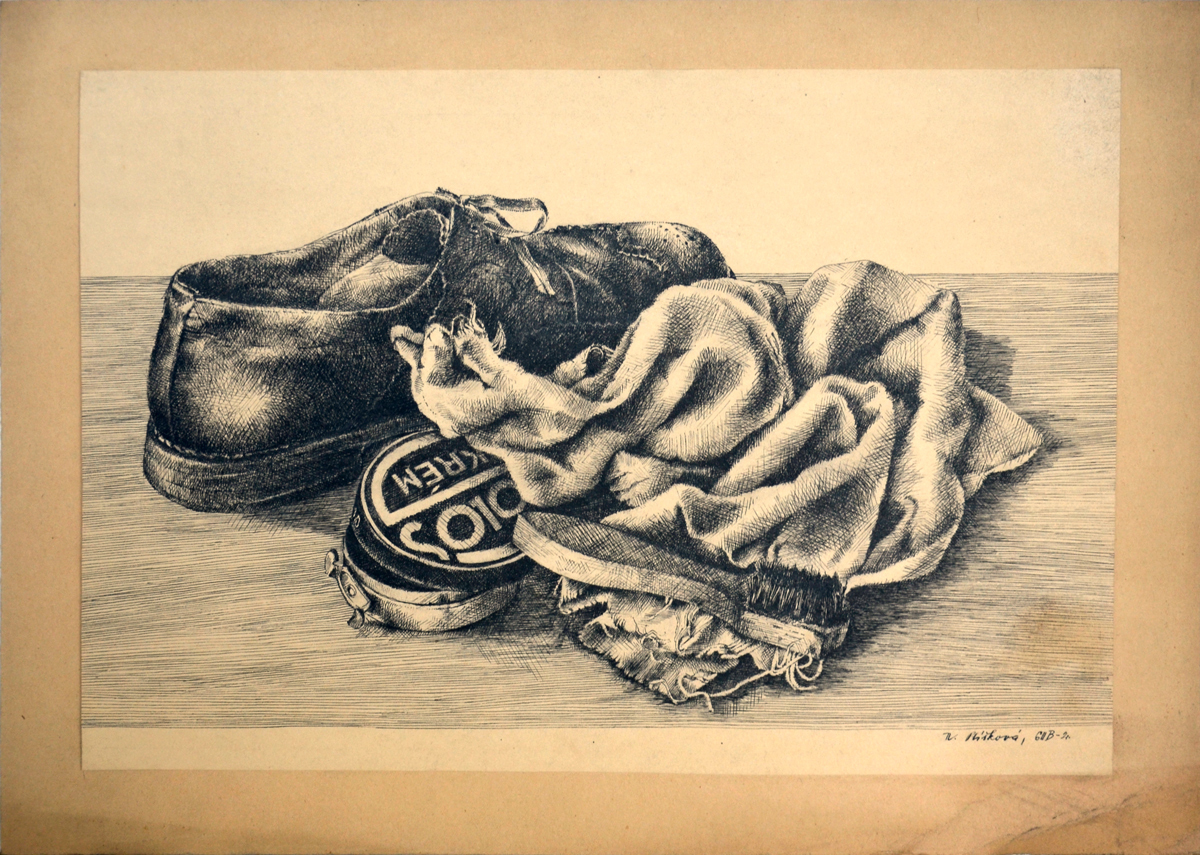
Naděžda Plíšková, classified work G II B, drypoint, 1952

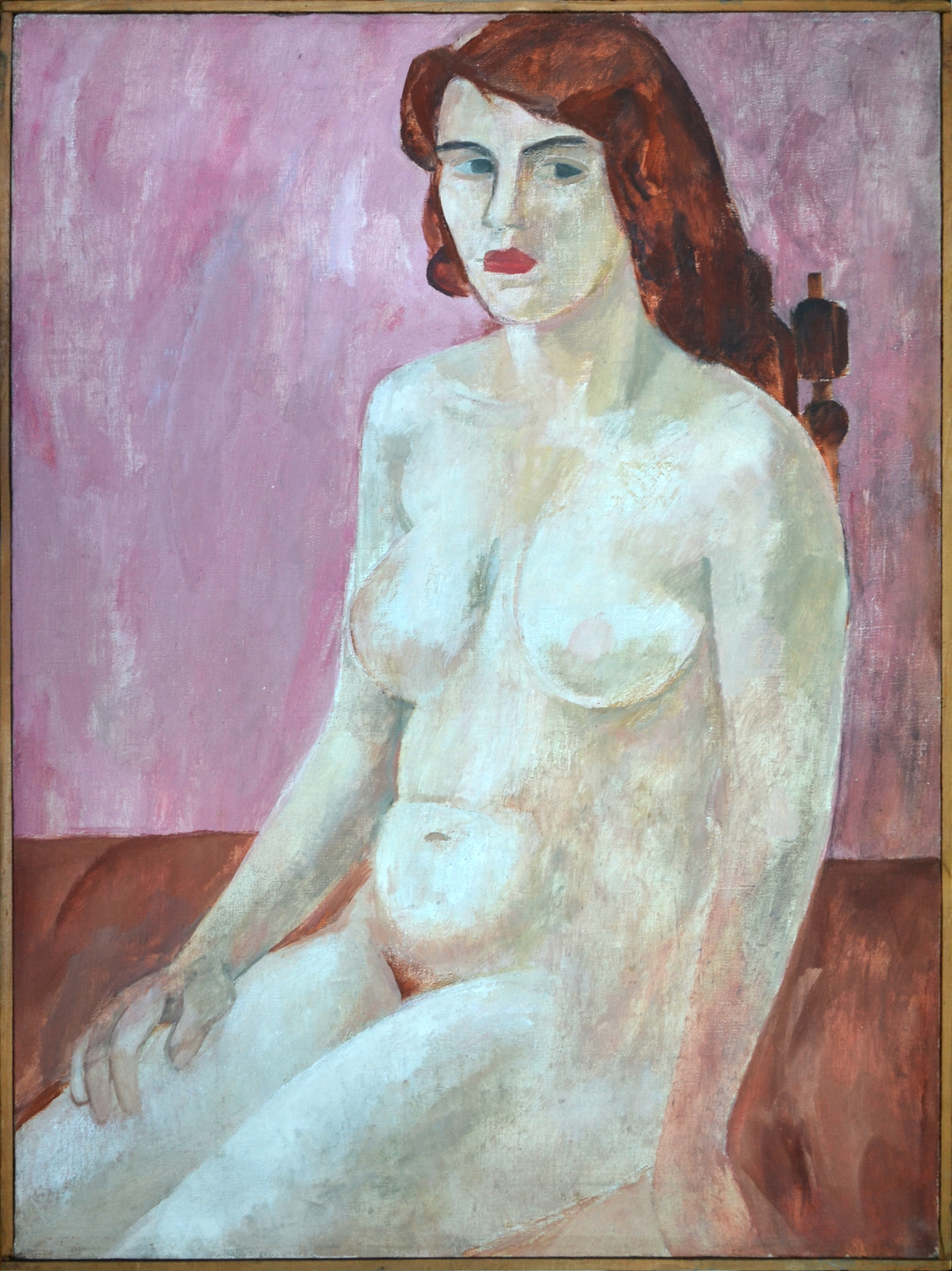
Nude, oil on canvas, 1950s

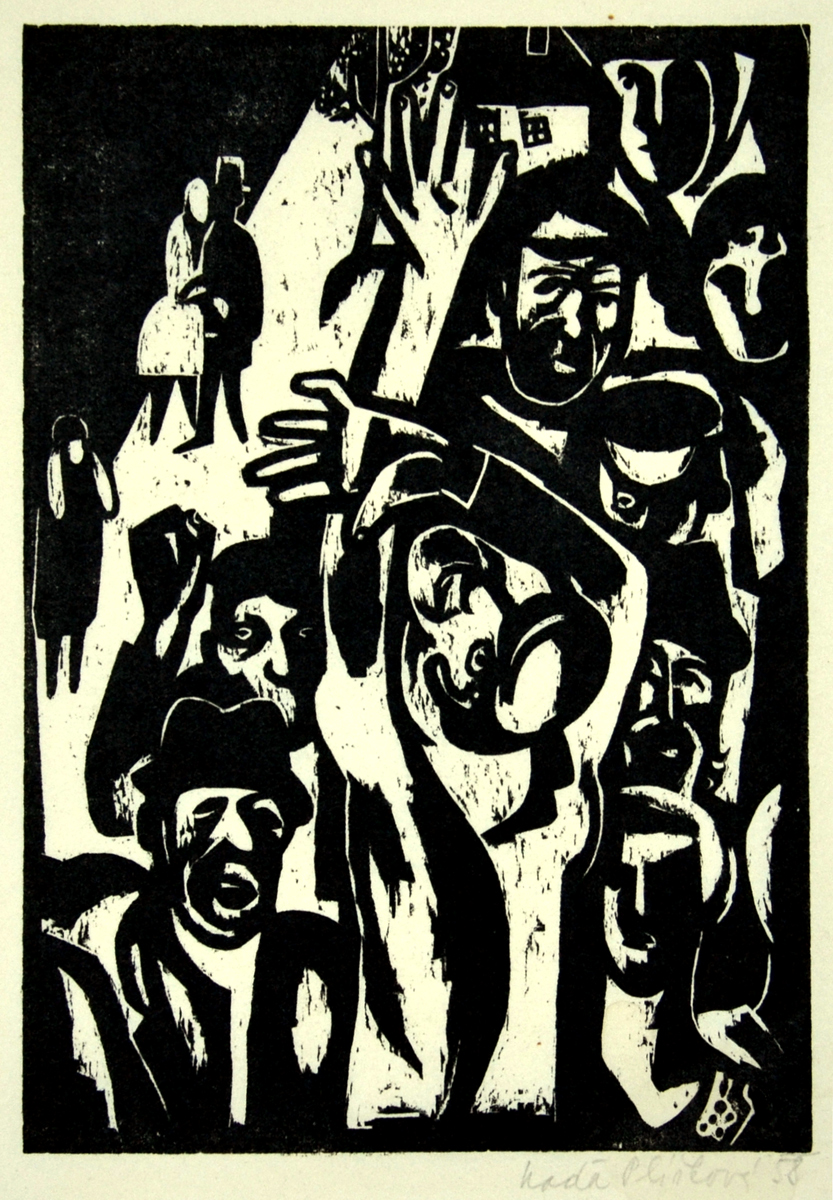
illustration of a book by Čapek, woodcut (2), 1958

=== Representation in collections ===
- Library of Congress, Washington D.C.
- Musée de l'art contemporaine, Paris
- Musée de la Ville de Paris
- Museo de Bellas Artes de Bilbao
- Museum Essen
- Kunsthalle, Darmstadt
- Owens Art Gallery Sackville, New Brunswick
- National Gallery in Prague
- Slovak National Gallery
- Aleš South Bohemian Gallery in Hluboká nad Vltavou
- Czech Museum of Fine Arts, Prague
- Prague City Gallery
- Gallery of Modern Art in Roudnice nad Labem
- North Bohemian Gallery of Fine Arts in Litoměřice
- Regional Gallery in Liberec
- Gallery of Fine Arts in Ostrava
- Art Gallery Karlovy Vary
- Gallery of Fine Arts in Havlíčkův Brod
- Gallery of Modern Art in Hradec Králové
- Regional Gallery of the Highlands in Jihlava
- Gallery of Fine Arts in Hodonin
- Museum of Art and Design Benešov
- Private collections at home and abroad

=== Exhibitions ===
==== Author´s ====
- 1967 Gallery of Youth, Mánes, Prague
- 1968 Nadezda Pliskova & Jiri Balcar: Grafik, Galerie am Berg, Stuttgart
- 1968 Graphics, Small Gallery of the Czechoslovak Writer, Brno
- 1970 Graphics, sculptures 1968–1970, Václav Špála Gallery, Prague
- 1978 Drawings, graphics, Cabinet of Graphic Arts, Olomouc
- 1982 Drawings and graphics, Exhibition Centre Černá Louka, Ostrava
- 1993 Revalvace, graphics, drawings, objects, Hollar Gallery, Prague
- 1997 Prints, drawings, Regional Gallery, Liberec
- 2000 Silence must be cultivated, Montmartre Gallery, Prague, Gambit Gallery, Prague
- 2013 Prints, objects, Hollar, Prague

==== Collective exhibitions abroad (selection) ====
- 1965 Keramik aus 12 ländern, Internationaler Künstlerclub IKC (Palais Pálffy), Vienna
- 1966 Junge tschechische Grafik, Heidelberg
- 1967 Tschechische Kunst, Göhrde
- 1967 17 tsjechische kunstenaars, Galerie Orez, The Hague
- 1968 Kunstamt Wilmersdorf, Berlín
- 1968 Sex Från Prag, Konstforum, Norrköping, Stenhusgården, Linköping
- 1968 VI. Internationale ausstellung Graphik, Europahaus Wien
- 1969 Zestien Tsjechische kunstenaars: Dertien grafici en drie keramisten, Amsterdam
- 1969 Junge Künstler aus der ČSSR, Berlin
- 1969 6 Graveurs de Prague, Galerie La Hune, Paris
- 1969 Salon de Mai, Sales d´Exposition Wilson, Paris
- 1969–1970 Recent Graphics from Prague, 12th Floor Gallery, Los Angeles
- 1970 Graveurs tchécoslovaques contemporains, Cabinet d'arts graphiques, Genéve
- 1971 45 zeitgenössische künstler aus der Tschechoslowakei: Malerei, Plastik, Grafik, Glasobjekte, Baukunst, Cologne
- 1971 Werken van Tsjechoslowaakse Grafici 1960-1970, Utrecht
- 1973 Art tchèque contemporain. Fribourg
- 1978 Christchurch Art Festival, Robert McDougall Art Gallery, Christchurch
- 1980 Die Kunst Osteuropas im 20. Jahrhundert, Garmisch-Partenkirchen
- 1990 Image Imprimée de Tchécoslovaquie. Affiche, gravure, illustration, La Louviere
- 1995 Grafik tschechischer Künstler, Bad Steben
- 2005 Strength and Will: Czech Prints from behind the Iron Curtain, Anne and Jacques Baruch Collection, Cincinnati Art Museum, Cincinnati
- 2005 Œuvres graphiques des années 60, Centre tchèque Paris

== Sources ==
=== Monography ===
- I, Naděžda Plíšková, text by Mariana Placáková, Museum Kampa - Jan and Meda Mládek Foundation, Prague 2019, ISBN 978-80-87344-49-1

=== Author catalogues (selection) ===
- Naděžda Plíšková: graphic art, text by Oleg Sus, Ludmila Vachtová, Čs. spisovatel, Brno 1968
- Naděžda Plíšková, text by Ivan Jirous, Art Centrum, Prague 1969
- Naděžda Plíšková: prints, sculptures, drawings, introduction by Ivan Jirous, Gallery of Fine Arts, Havlíčkův Brod 1970
- Naděžda Plíšková: prints - sculptures 1968-1970, text by Ivan Jirous., Union of Czechoslovak Visual Artists, Prague 1970
- Naděžda Plíšková: drawings and prints, text by František Dvořák, photographs by Ivan Wurm, Jiří Hampl and the photographic workshop of the National Gallery, in: Regional Gallery of Fine Arts, Olomouc 1978
- Naděžda Plíšková: prints - drawings - ex libris, text by František Šmejkal. Prague: Czech Fine Arts Fund, 1981
- Naděžda Plíšková: drawings and prints, text by Jindřich Chalupecký, František Dvořák, František Šmejkal, Milan Weber, Ostrava 1982
- Naděžda Plíšková: revalvace: prints, drawings, objects, Hollar Gallery, Prague 1993
- Naděžda Plíšková: prints and objects, text by Naďa Řeháková, Regional Gallery in Liberec 1997

=== General monographs ===
- Luboš Hlaváček, Contemporary graphics (II), Odeon, Prague 1978, pp. 68–69.
- Genevieve Bénamou, L'art aujourd'hui en Tchécoslovaquie, 190 p., Genevieve Bénamou (ed.), Goussainville 1979
- František Dvořák, Contemporary ex-libris, Odeon, Prague 1979, pp. 62–63.
- Jindřich Marco, About graphic art: a book for collectors and art lovers, Mladá fronta, Prague 1981, pp. 107, 137, 335.
- Jindřich Chalupecký, New Art in Bohemia, Edition Ars pictura, vol. 1., 173 p., H&H, Jinočany 1994, ISBN 80-85787-81-4.
- Jiří Bouda et al., Czech Graphic Art of the 20th Century, introduction by Jiří Machalický, reprofoto by Roman Maleček, 325 p., Association of Czech Graphic Artists Hollar, Prague 1997, ISBN 80-902405-0-X.

=== Encyclopaedias, dictionaries ===
- Dictionary of Czech writers: an attempt to reconstruct the history of Czech literature 1948–1979. Jiří Brabec (ed.) et al., Sixty-Eight Publishers, Toronto 1982, ISBN 0-88781-128-0
- Dictionary of banned authors 1948–1980. Jiří Brabec, Jan Lopatka, Jiří Gruša, Petr Kabeš, Igor Hájek; index compiled by Aleš Zach, 349 p., Státní pedagogické nakladatelství, Prague 1991, ISBN 80-04-25417-9
- SČUG Hollar 1917-1992: contemporary graphics. František Dvořák et al., 128 p., Union of Czech Artists and Graphic Designers Hollar, Prague 1992, Text in English and German. Variant titles SČUG Hollar / SČUG Hollar 1917-1992 : contemporary graphic art / SČUG Hollar 1917-1992 : zeitgenössische Graphik.
- Graphics: Pictorial Encyclopaedia of Czech Graphic Art of the Eighties, 255 p., Concept and introductory text by Simeona Hošková, Central European Gallery and Publishing House, Prague 1993 (Concurrent text and subtitle in English, French, Italian, German, Spanish), ISBN 80-901559-0-1
- New encyclopedia of Czech visual arts. N-F. Ed. Anděla Horová (ed.), 623 p., Academia, Prague 1995, ISBN 80-200-0536-6
- Dictionary of Czech and Slovak Visual Artists 1950–2003. XI. Pau-Pop. Alena Malá (ed.), 252 p., Chagall Art Centre, Ostrava 2003, ISBN 80-86171-16-7
