= Jiří Gruntorád =

Czech political writer (born 1952)

Jiří Gruntorád (born 21 September 1952) is a Czech publisher and political writer. He is a former publisher of samizdat literature, a member of the Committee for the Defense of the Unjustly Prosecuted, and a signatory of Charter 77. In 1980–1984 he was imprisoned for "subversion of the republic", a charge often used by that time's totalitarian communist regime in Czechoslovakia to prosecute political dissidents, human rights activists, and writers. After the fall of the communist regime, he founded and directed Libri prohibiti, a library in Prague dedicated to samizdat and exile literature. As an author, he contributed to publications on samizdat and exile literature. He served on the Academic Council of the Institute for the Study of Totalitarian Regimes.

== Life and career ==
Gruntorád was born on 21 September 1952 in Prague, Czechoslovakia. During the socialist dictatorship, he worked in manual labor jobs, as a stoker or a bricklayer. Since 1978, he began publishing samizdat literature; his edition called Popelnice (lit. 'trash can') eventually released almost 130 books banned by the regime. The first book he published was Jaroslav Seifert's poetry collection The Plague Colum. It was on the basis of samizdat books he published or collected that the Libri Prohibiti library he created after the Velvet Revolution was initially based. Today, the library preserves and provides access to the largest collection of banned and exile books, documents, periodicals, and other materials in Czech Republic. The library opened to the public in 1990.

After he signed Charter 77 in 1979, he was imprisoned twice. He was first sentenced to three months for a bogus charge of illegal possession of a firearm (he was rehabilitated in 1990). Not long after his release, he faced a second term of imprisonment, this time for four years, for "subversion of the republic" (1980–1984), an offense he allegedly committed by distributing music recordings and copies of literary texts (including works by Jaroslav Seifert and Bohuslav Reynek). He spent the years 1981–1983 in the Minkovice prison, where inmates worked under harsh conditions for jewelry manufacturer Preciosa. During his imprisonment, he was beaten by guards: when he complained about this, fourteen months were added to his sentence, as the guards claimed he had injured himself in order to falsely accuse them. Following this incident, he was reclassified by court order to the third (most restrictive) security category and imprisoned at Valdice prison for the next fourteen months. This additional penalty was overturned by the court in 1985. After his release, he lived for another three years under "protective surveillance", during which – among other restrictions – he was prohibited from leaving the Prague 2 district at night. He worked as a stoker but was dismissed from this job as well for political reasons.

Following the establishment of the Institute for the Study of Totalitarian Regimes in 2008, he was appointed a member of its Scientific Council. He left it shortly after historian Jiří Pernes was appointed the Institute's new director. In 2010, director Daniel Herman appointed him a member of the new Advisory Board to the Director of the Institute for the Study of Totalitarian Regimes.

In 2011, together with fellow Minkovice prisoners Vladimír Hučín and Jiří Wolf, he testified in the trial of former guard and later Communist MP Josef Vondruška, stating that Vondruška had punished them with excessive aggression. Vondruška was ultimately not convicted.

In 2016, he helped launch International Samizdat Day.

== Honours ==
- 2002 – Medal of Merit, 1st class
- 2002 – Magnesia Litera for contribution to Czech literature
- 2008 – Z. V. Tobolka Commemorative Medal
- 2010 – City of Plzeň's June 1st Prize for courage in disseminating banned literature during the totalitarian regime and for founding the Libri Prohibiti library
- 2011 – The Minister of Defence of the Czech Republic's Golden Linden Award
- 2012 – The Polish Medal of Gratitude, awarded by the European Solidarity Centre
- 2019 – Masaryk University Silver Medal
- 2019 – The Fragments of Memory Award, presented as part of the Mene Tekel project conference
- 2023 – Institute for the Study of Totalitarian Regimes Award for Freedom, Democracy, and Human Rights
- 2024 – Medal for Merit in Diplomacy for an extraordinary and lifelong contribution to the fight against totalitarianism and the development of democracy
- 2024 – Ferdinand I Award (together with John Bok)
- 2025 – Revolver Revue Award
- 2025 – Commemorative medal of the Institute of National Memory, Bratislava

== Selected works ==
- Information about Charter 77 (Doplněk 1998). ISBN 978-80-7239-006-9
- Exile periodicals. Catalogue of Czech and Slovak exile periodicals and expatriate publications issued after 1945. ISBN 978-80-85996-24-1
- Kritický sborník 1981–1989. A Selection from Samizdat Issues. (Triáda 2009, co-author). ISBN 978-80-87256-02-2
