= Libri Prohibiti =

Czech archival research library and organization

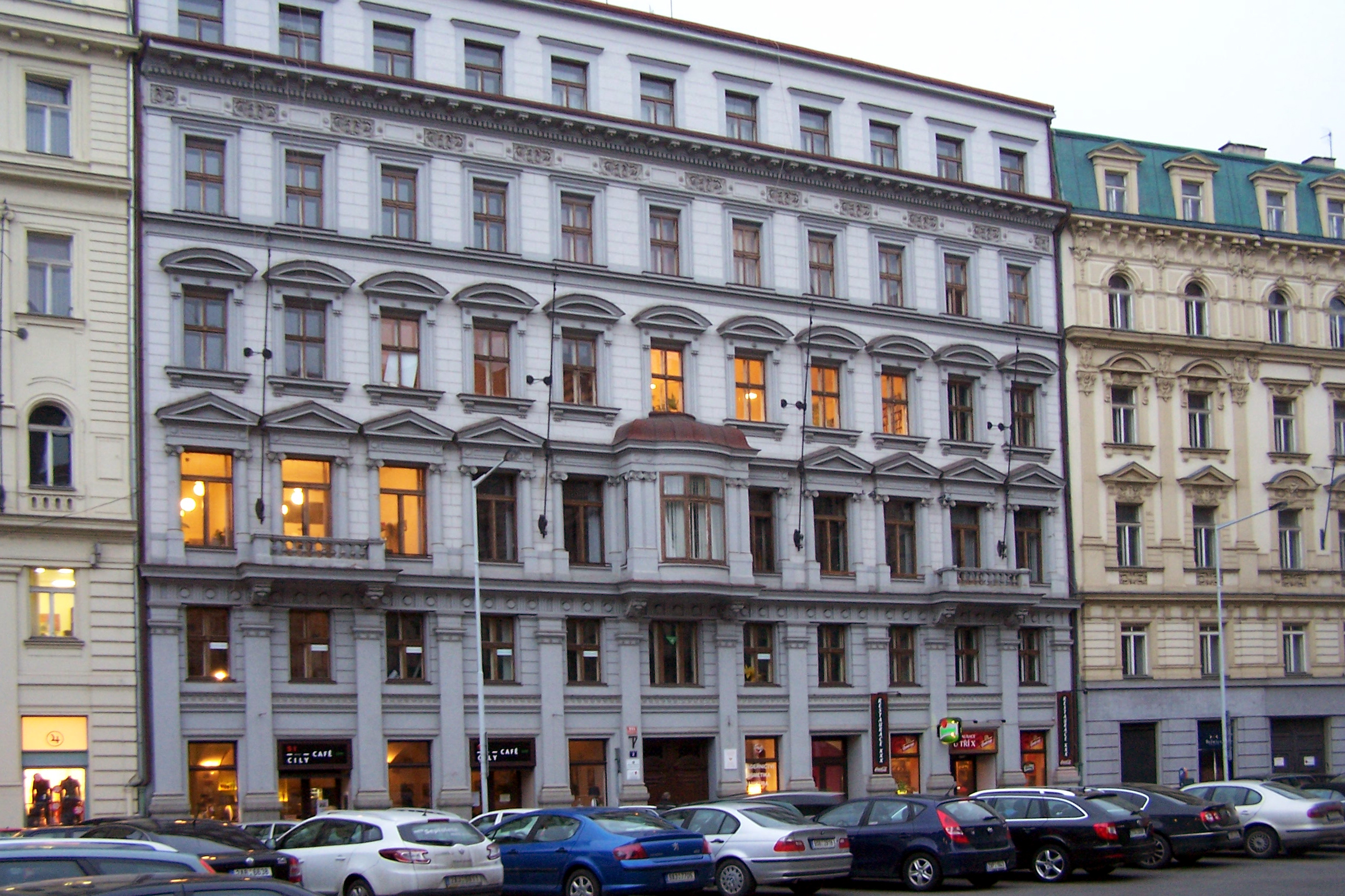
- 50°5′9.21″N 14°25′47.61″E
- Location: Senovážné námĕstí 2, 110 00 Prague 1, Czech Republic
- Established: October 22, 1990

Collection
- Size: 29,200 library units, 2,560 periodicals

Other information
- Director: Jiří Gruntorád
- Website: http://libpro.cts.cuni.cz/EN/index_en.html

Libri Prohibiti is a nonprofit, private, independent, archival research library located in Prague, Czech Republic that collects samizdat and exile literature. The organization is maintained and run by Jiří Gruntorád and includes more than 29,200 monographs and periodicals, about 2,900 reference resources, and over 5,000 audiovisual materials.

== Overview ==
Location: Libri Prohibiti is located on the third floor of Senovazne namesti 2, Prague 1, Czech Republic

Hours: Monday - Thursday, 1:00 - 5:00 p.m. (except holidays and school vacations)

The Libri Prohibiti is free to all visitors. The library houses a reading room that can accommodate eighteen people and averages approximately ten visitors per day. Reference services are provided in person, via email, and over the telephone. The collections are non-circulating due to the uniqueness and frailty of the items.

The staff consists of the director - Jiří Gruntorád, a part-time Video and Audio Archivist, a part-time Magazine Archivist, and several unpaid volunteers and library and information science students from the nearby Charles University and the Josef Škvorecký private college.

As of the 2009 Annual Report, the Libri Prohibiti's main goals are to “accumulate the most complete and highest quality collection of…materials which were created by the Czech and Slovak exile” and “completely catalog these collections by computer and to make the results accessible for the purpose of further research, both in [its] computer network and in the form of book and periodical publications”.

A majority of the library's 2009 income is acquired through government grants and individual sponsors. To aid in funding, the Libri Prohibiti constantly seeks grants from the Ministries of Culture and Foreign Affairs of the Czech Republic. Since government funding is limited, the library depends on the generosity of individual donors for much of its income.

== History of Samizdat in Czechoslovakia ==
When Czechoslovakia was under Communist rule in the mid- to late-twentieth century, over 400 writers and journalists were prohibited from publishing and distributing any of their works. Some writers, such as Václav Havel, were persecuted and sentenced to prison if they did not comply with these regulations. During this time many different types of performers, entertainers, and various other creators were persecuted for and banned from performing or creating their specific art forms. It was almost impossible for these persecuted individuals to find any kind of employment after this.

In defiance of these regulations, some banned authors began writing samizdat articles and distributing them secretly in Czechoslovakia and abroad. In order to produce multiple copies of their works, they used carbon paper to produce up to fifteen copies at once. Other methods of copying included cyclostyle, spirit duplicator, photocopying, and xerography. The materials were secretly distributed among dissidents and sometimes smuggled abroad. All of these actions were very dangerous and those caught faced imprisonment or exile. During this time, Jiří Gruntorád, the current caretaker of the Libri Prohibiti, was imprisoned for four years for distributing samizdat literature.

In addition to dissident articles, many popular books were banned and subsequently distributed as samizdats. Some of the most famous works include George Orwell’s Nineteen Eighty-Four and J.R.R. Tolkien’s The Lord of the Rings, both of which are held at the Libri Prohibiti.

== History of the Libri Prohibiti ==
On October 22, 1990, the Libri Prohibiti opened with help from different organizations including the Czechoslovak Charter 77 and the President of the Czech Republic. The original location was on Podskalska Street, and later moved to its current location at Senovazne namesti 2. The collection began with around 2,000 monographs and magazines that were acquired by Jiri Gruntorad during the years of “normalization” in the Czech Republic. Since then, the collection has continued to grow and expand with the help and support of government grants and generous donors.

The Society of Libri Prohibiti was formed on April 24, 1991, to help the library establish itself as a legal entity. The society was officially established after registering with the Ministry of the Interior of the Czech Republic. The primary goal of the society is to help the Libri Prohibiti continue operating and acquiring new materials for its collections.

Many of the founding members of this society were significant and established authors, former government and academic leaders and employees, and teachers and other prominent members of the community. Among some of the most prominent founders of the society were Václav Havel, Ivan Klima, and Jan Vladislav.

Today there are over 180 members of the Society of Libri Prohibiti. The society invites any interested people to join if they would like to contribute or help the Libri Prohibiti in any way.

== Collections ==
The Libri Prohibiti's collection contains Czech, Slovak, Polish, Russian, and Ukrainian exile and samizdat literature and includes monographs, periodicals, archival works, reference resources, and audiovisual materials. As of the 2009, the collection comprises over 29,200 library units and over 2,560 periodicals.

The library is divided into eleven categories based on type, origin, and content of the item.

- Czech Samizdat Monographs and Periodicals

- Includes 14,300 units created from the 1950s through the 1980s during the time of Communist rule. Over 390 of these items are periodicals.

Some of the titles within this section are:

- Edice Expedice

- Petlice

- Popelnice

- Information about Charter 77 (periodical)

- Revolver Revue (periodical)

- Vokno (periodical)

- Czech Exile Monographs and Periodicals

- Includes 7,400 exiled items representing more than 435 publishers and individuals. The library holds many of the publishers' complete productions or editions.

- Monographs and Periodicals of the First and Second World War Resistances

- From World War I, there are a total of 90 items of legionnaire’s literature. From the Czech war exile (1930 to 1945) there is a total of 840 monographs. This collection also includes over 100 different magazines from World War I and World War II.

- Foreign Samizdat Monographs and Periodicals

- Includes more than 380 samizdats and 43 periodicals from Slovakia and over 1,100 samizdats and 290 periodicals of Poland. Russian samizdat and periodicals are marginally represented.

- Foreign Exile Monographs and Periodicals

- Includes more than 720 Slovak and 420 Russian and Ukrainian exile monographs, as well as 50 Slovak and 30 Russian and Ukrainian periodicals. Polish exile literature is marginally represented.

- Foreign-Language Monographs and Periodicals

- Includes over 2,800 monographs and 480 periodicals related to the former Czechoslovakia.

- Documentation and Archives

- Includes a partially processed collection of 1,500 unpublished manuscripts, flyers, posters, photographs, and newspaper clippings that vary in topic and medium. Most of the collection contains written documents that originated from the activity of different organizations and agencies, such as Charter 77, the Committee for the Defense of the Unjustly Prosecuted (VONS), and the East European Information Agency.

- Reference Library - General Subject and Secondary Literature

- Includes over 2,900 books, magazines, and other writings about samizdat and exile literature.

- Audiovisual Section

- Includes recordings of non-conformist music on 2,530 cassettes, 1,200 CD-ROMs, and 200 gramophone records; 750 audio recordings of underground lectures and seminars; 1,260 video documentaries and films, 670 video cassettes, and 350 DVDs.

== Publications ==
1. Exilova periodika: Katalog periodik ceskeho a slovenskeho exilu a krajanských tisku vydavanych po roce 1945 (Exile Periodicals: Catalog of Czech and Slovak Exile Periodicals and Czech Printed Material Issued Abroad after 1945)

2. Informace o Charte 77: Clánkova bibliografie 1978-1990 (Information about Charter 77: An Article Bibliography, 1978-1990)

3. Katalog knih ceskeho exilu 1948-1994 (Catalog of Books of the Czech Exile, 1948-1994)

4. Sdelení Vyboru na obranu nespravedlive stíhanych a Zpravy Vychodoevropske informacni agentury (Communications of the Committee for the Defense of the Unjustly Prosecuted and Reports of the East European Information Agency)

== Name ==
The name Libri Prohibiti is Latin for forbidden books.

== See also ==
- Samizdat
- Charter 77
- List of libraries in the Czech Republic
