= Revolver Revue =

Czech quarterly literary magazine

Revolver Revue is a Czech quarterly literary magazine published in Prague, Czech Republic. The magazine was an underground periodical and issued legally after the Velvet Revolution.

== History and profile ==
Revolver Revue was established in January 1985. The first issue was only fifty copies. The founders were Ivan Lamper, Jáchym Topol and Viktor Karlík.

The magazine became a literary magazine in December 1990. It is published four times a year.

A complete archive of "Revolver Revue" exists at Libri Prohibiti, a library of prohibited and banned books and samizdat in Prague.
