= List of Už jsme doma members =

The following is a chronology of the lineups of the Czech progressive rock group Už jsme doma. The band has released eleven studio albums, toured worldwide, and strongly influenced the Czech alternative rock scene.

Už jsme doma formed in 1985 in Teplice, Czechoslovakia, and later became based in Prague after the Velvet Revolution. No musicians have played in all lineups of the band, but singer, composer, and multi-instrumentalist Miroslav Wanek (also of FPB) has led the group since 1986. In addition to Wanek and longtime illustrator Martin Velíšek, Už jsme doma has included one trumpet player, five saxophonists, five guitarists, two melodic percussionists, eight bass players (plus Wanek from 1986 to 1988), and six drummers (plus Milan Nový, who was also an early saxophonist).

== Members ==
Current

- Miroslav Wanek – lead vocals, guitar, keyboards, bass (1986–present)
- Martin Velíšek – illustrations (1994–present)
- Pepa Červinka – bass, vocals (2005–present)
- Adam Tomášek – trumpet, vocals (2007–present)
- Vojtěch Bořil – drums (2016–present)

Past

- Jindra Dolanský – saxophone, vocals (1985–2001; one-off, 2005)
- Milan Nový – saxophone, vocals (1985–1986); drums, vocals (1987–1989, 1993–1995)
- Jiří Solar – guitar (1985–1986)
- Jiří Závodný – keyboards, vocals (1985–1986; one-off, 2005)
- Petr Keřka – bass (1985–1986)
- Jula Horváth – drums (1985–1987; died 2009)
- Ota Chlupsa – guitar, vocals (1985–1986)
- Roman Kolařík – vibraphone, vocals (1985–1986; one-off, 2005)
- Martin Kubát – saxophone (1986)
- Romek Hanzlík – guitar, vocals, vibraphone (1986–1996; one-off, 2005; died 2019)
- Martina Fialová – saxophone, vocals (1987–1988)
- Alice Kalousková – saxophone, vocals (1987–1991; one-off, 2005)
- Pavel Keřka – bass, vocals (1988–1993)
- Pavel Pavlíček – drums (1989–1993)
- Jan Cerha – bass, vocals (1993–1995)
- Kamil Krůta – bass, vocals (1995–1996)
- Petr Böhm – drums (1995–2005; one-off, 2005)
- Radek Podveský – guitar, vocals (1996–2005)
- Jan Čejka – bass, vocals (1996–2001; one-off, 2005)
- Jaroslav Cvach – bass, vocals (2001–2003; one-off, 2005)
- Miloš Albrecht – bass, vocals (2003–2005)
- Petr Židel – guitar, vocals (2005–2007; died 2016)
- Tomáš Paleta – drums (2005–2011)
- Jaroslav Noga – drums (2011–2016)

== Lineups ==
Už jsme doma line-ups
1985	Jindra Dolanský – saxophone, vocals; Milan Nový – saxophone, vocals; Jiří Solar – guitar, vocals; Jiří Závodný – piano, vocals; Petr Keřka – bass, vocals; Jula Horváth – drums	"Jo Nebo Nebo" recording released on Patnáct Kapek Vody (recorded 1985, released 2000); "Parník 1985" 7 inch (recorded 1985, released 2016)
1985–1986	Jindra Dolanský – saxophone, vocals; Milan Nový – saxophone, vocals; Martin Kubát – saxophone, vocals; Ota Chlupsa – guitar, vocals; Jiří Solar – guitar, vocals; Jiří Závodný – piano, vocals; Petr Keřka – bass, vocals; Jula Horváth – drums, percussion; Roman Kolařík – xylophone
1986	Miroslav Wanek – vocals; Jindra Dolanský – saxophone, vocals; Martin Kubát – saxophone, vocals; Ota Chlupsa – guitar, vocals; Romek Hanzlík – guitar, vibraphone, vocals; Jiří Závodný – piano, vocals; Petr Keřka – bass, vocals; Jula Horváth – drums
1986–1987	Miroslav Wanek – vocals, bass; Jindra Dolanský – saxophone, vocals; Romek Hanzlík – guitar, vibraphone, vocals; Jula Horváth – drums	Uprostřed slov (original self-released cassette, 1987)
1987–1988	Miroslav Wanek – vocals, bass; Jindra Dolanský – saxophone, vocals; Romek Hanzlík – guitar, vibraphone, vocals; Alice Kalousková – saxophone, vocals; Martina Fialová – saxophone, vocals; Milan Nový – drums, vocals
1988	Miroslav Wanek – vocals, guitar, keyboards; Jindra Dolanský – saxophone, vocals; Romek Hanzlík – guitar, vibraphone, vocals; Alice Kalousková – saxophone, vocals; Martina Fialová – saxophone, vocals; Pavel Keřka – bass, vocals; Milan Nový – drums, vocals
1988–1989	Miroslav Wanek – vocals, guitar, keyboards; Jindra Dolanský – saxophone, vocals; Romek Hanzlík – guitar, vibraphone, vocals; Alice Kalousková – saxophone, vocals; Pavel Keřka – bass, vocals; Milan Nový – drums, vocals	Rock Debut No. 7 (1989)
1989–1991	Miroslav Wanek – vocals, guitar, keyboards; Jindra Dolanský – saxophone, vocals; Romek Hanzlík – guitar, vibraphone, vocals; Alice Kalousková – saxophone, vocals; Pavel Keřka – bass, vocals; Pavel Pavlíček – drums, vocals	Uprostřed slov (1990); Nemilovaný svět (1990)
1991–1993	Miroslav Wanek – vocals, guitar, keyboards; Jindra Dolanský – saxophone, vocals; Romek Hanzlík – guitar, vocals; Pavel Keřka – bass, vocals; Pavel Pavlíček – drums, vocals	Hollywood (1993)
1993	Miroslav Wanek – vocals, guitar, keyboards; Jindra Dolanský – saxophone, vocals; Romek Hanzlík – guitar, vocals; Pavel Keřka – bass, vocals; Milan Nový – drums, vocals
1993–1994	Miroslav Wanek – vocals, guitar, keyboards; Jindra Dolanský – saxophone, vocals; Romek Hanzlík – guitar, vocals; Jan Cerha – bass, vocals; Milan Nový – drums, vocals
1994–1995	Miroslav Wanek – vocals, guitar, keyboards; Jindra Dolanský – saxophone, vocals; Romek Hanzlík – guitar, vocals; Jan Cerha – bass, vocals; Milan Nový – drums, vocals; Martin Velíšek – brushes	Pohádky ze Zapotřebí (1995); Jaro, Peklo, Podzim, Zima (1995)
1995	Miroslav Wanek – vocals, guitar, keyboards; Jindra Dolanský – saxophone, vocals; Romek Hanzlík – guitar, vocals; Kamil Krůta – bass, vocals; Milan Nový – drums, vocals; Martin Velíšek – brushes
1995–1996	Miroslav Wanek – vocals, guitar, keyboards; Jindra Dolanský – saxophone, vocals; Romek Hanzlík – guitar, vocals; Kamil Krůta – bass, vocals; Petr Böhm – drums; Martin Velíšek – brushes	Performances as the Residents' Freak Show live band (1995); Two bonus live tracks on Vancouver 1997 (recorded 1996, released 1997)
1996–2001	Miroslav Wanek – vocals, guitar, keyboards; Jindra Dolanský – saxophone, vocals; Radek Podveský – guitar, vocals; Jan Čejka – bass, vocals; Petr Böhm – drums; Martin Velíšek – brushes	Vancouver 1997 (1997); Uši (1999)
2001–2003	Miroslav Wanek – vocals, guitar, keyboards; Radek Podveský – guitar, vocals; Jaroslav Cvach – bass, vocals; Petr Böhm – drums; Martin Velíšek – brushes
2003–2005	Miroslav Wanek – vocals, guitar, keyboards; Radek Podveský – guitar, vocals; Miloš Albrecht – bass, vocals; Petr Böhm – drums; Martin Velíšek - brushes	Rybí tuk (2003); Už jsme doma v Tokiu DVD (2006)
2005–2007	Miroslav Wanek – vocals, guitar, keyboards; Petr Židel – guitar, vocals; Pepa Červinka – bass, vocals; Tomáš Paleta – drums; Martin Velíšek – brushes	20 Letů (live, 2005)^{[note]}; Sestřih Bratřih (medley; recorded 2005, released 2017)^{[note]}; "Životopis" track on Brno – město básníků compilation (2007)
2007–2011	Miroslav Wanek – vocals, guitar, keyboards; Pepa Červinka – bass, vocals; Adam Tomášek – trumpet, vocals; Tomáš Paleta – drums; Martin Velíšek – brushes	Czech Music on the Road – 10 Days That Shook Japan DVD (2009); Jeskyně (2010)
2011–2016	Miroslav Wanek – vocals, guitar, keyboards; Pepa Červinka – bass, vocals; Adam Tomášek – trumpet, vocals; Jaroslav Noga – drums; Martin Velíšek – brushes	Moravian Meeting (live collaboration with Randy of the Residents, recorded 2011, released 2020); Pohádek ze Zapotřebí znovuudělání fortelné (re-recording of Pohádky ze Zapotřebí, 2012); Tři Křížky (2015)
2016–present	Miroslav Wanek – vocals, guitar, keyboards; Pepa Červinka – bass, vocals; Adam Tomášek – trumpet, vocals; Vojtěch Bořil – drums; Martin Velíšek – brushes	Kry (2018)

== Notes ==
Commemorating the band's 20th anniversary, the live album 20 Letů and studio medley Sestřih Bratřih were collaborations between the 2005 lineup—Miroslav Wanek, Petr Židel, Pepa Červinka, Tomáš Paleta, and Martin Velíšek—and past members Jindra Dolanský, Alice Flesarová (formerly Kalousková), Jiří Závodný, Roman Kolařík, Romek Hanzlík, Jan Čejka, Petr Böhm, and Jaroslav Cvach.
