= Mňága a Žďorp =

Czech rock band

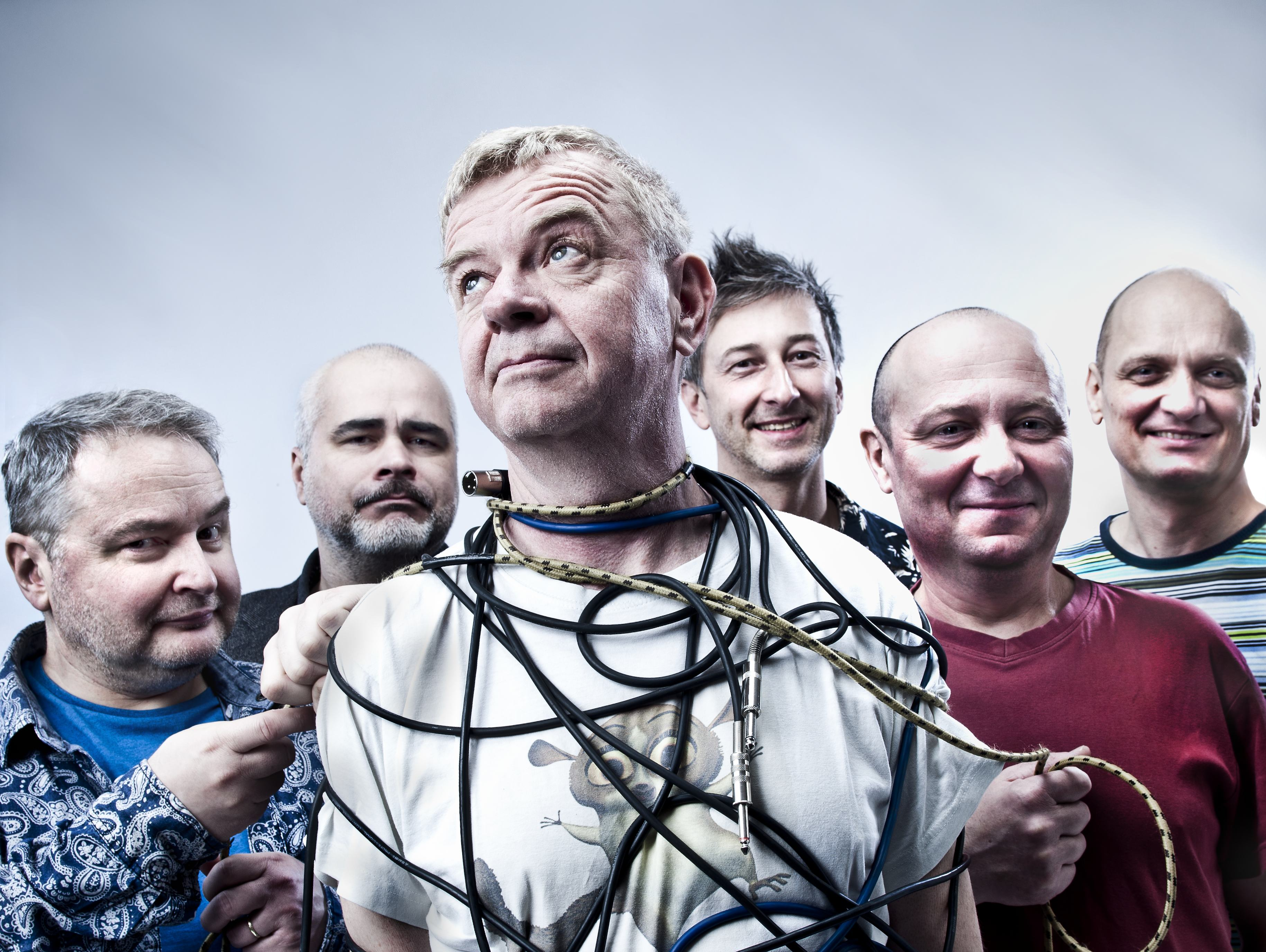
- Mňága a Žďorp promotional photo, 2016

Background information
- Also known as: Rytmus 85
- Origin: Valašské Meziříčí, Czechoslovakia
- Genre: Alternative rock
- Years active: 1987–present
- Label: Surikata
- Spinoff of: Slepé střevo
- Award: Anděl (2025)
- Members: Petr Fiala; Petr Nekuža; Jaromír Mikel; Jiří Tibitanzl; Marcel Gabriel
- Past members: Martin Knor; Ivo Chmelař; Radek Odstrčil; Karel Mikuš; Lukáš Filip; Jarek Pernický; Herbert Ullrich; Jiří Fiala; Radek Koutný; Pavel Fadrný; Pavel Koudelka; Roman Volný
- Website: mnaga.cz

Mňága a Žďorp is a Czech rock band from Valašské Meziříčí. A precursor of the group was formed in 1983 under the name Slepé střevo. The band's lineup has changed frequently over the years and currently consists of Petr Fiala on guitar, Petr Nekuža on bass, Jaromír Mikel on guitar, Jiří Tibitanzl on saxophone, keyboards, and percussion, and Marcel Gabriel on drums. The band became known for their 1991 hit "Hodinový hotel", from their debut album, Made in Valmez. Their latest record, released in 2019, is titled Třecí plochy.

== History ==
=== Slepé střevo, Happyend: 1983–87 ===
Slepé střevo was formed in 1983 by vocalist and guitarist Petr Fiala, bassist Jarek Odstrčil, saxophonist Hynek Hulík, multi-instrumentalist Ivo Chmelař, and drummer Karel Mikuš, who were all schoolmates, and they initially rehearsed in a shed on the Fiala family property in Valašské Meziříčí. The band wrote new wave songs and performed their first show in June of the same year. They were soon joined by singer Broňa Volfová, though she left shortly after. Before the year was out, Slepé střevo had also lost Hulík and Odstrčil, each for their own respective reasons.

The first half of 1984 was taken up with various shows (often under the name Rytmus 85) as well as musician swaps, resulting in a lineup that would last until the group, in its early incarnation, disbanded in 1985: Fiala, Chmelař, Mikuš, and new members Jiří Fiala (bass) and Jiří Dohnal (saxophone).

In 1985, Slepé střevo recorded an 80-minute tape titled Nečum a tleskej!, which included their entire musical repertoire up to that time. They distributed it independently, and shortly after, split up. In June, Petr and Jiří Fiala, Martin Knor (Koroze), and Herbert Ullrich formed a new band, called Happyend. The Fiala brothers played bass guitars, Knor and Ullrich played guitars, and they were joined by drummer Jiří "Čeči" Čierňava. In May 1986, Happyend recorded their first and only album, ...Happyend! In June, they performed at the first Rockfest in Prague.

=== Mňága a Žďorp launch: 1987–89 ===
At the beginning of 1987, Petr Fiala met singer and songwriter Jindra Spilka and, together with guitarist Roman Mórocz and drummer Jiří Čierňava, they founded the punk band Smrt mladého sebevraha. They played a number of concerts and recorded seven songs (one of which, "Pankáči pankáči", was later recorded by Mňága a Ždorp) for a demo tape titled Veselý hřbitov. Happyend broke up in the spring, and the former members of Slepé střevo soon agreed to reunite as Mňága and Ždorp. At this point, the group consisted of Petr Fiala, Ivo Chmelař, bassist Radek Odstrčil, drummer Karel Mikuš, and saxophonists Lukáš Filip and Jarek Pernický, though Pernický left shortly after.

In 1988, Mňága a Ždorp performed at Rockfest. Later that year, they were joined by a third guitarist, former Happyend member Martin Knor. Radek Odstrčil emigrated to the United States and was replaced on bass guitar by Herbert Ullrich, also formerly of Happyend. In the fall, Ivo Chmelař had to go perform military service, while Jiří Fiala returned from his own stint in the army. He took over the bass from Ullrich, who then ended up playing guitar.

In March 1989, Mňága a Žďorp recorded their first demo, consisting of five tracks, four of which went on to be released a year later on the Panton Records series Rock Debut. In April, Petr Fiala unveiled his solo project Jonáš Hvězda at Rockfest.

=== Early albums and hiatus: 1990–94 ===
In the spring of 1990, Mňága a Žďorp appeared on television for the first time and in November, they recorded their debut album, Made in Valmez. In December, Ullrich left the band and was replaced by Radek Koutný. Made in Valmez came out in June 1991, and Jiří Fiala departed shortly after, to be replaced by Petr Nekuža. In November, the band toured Belgium and the UK.

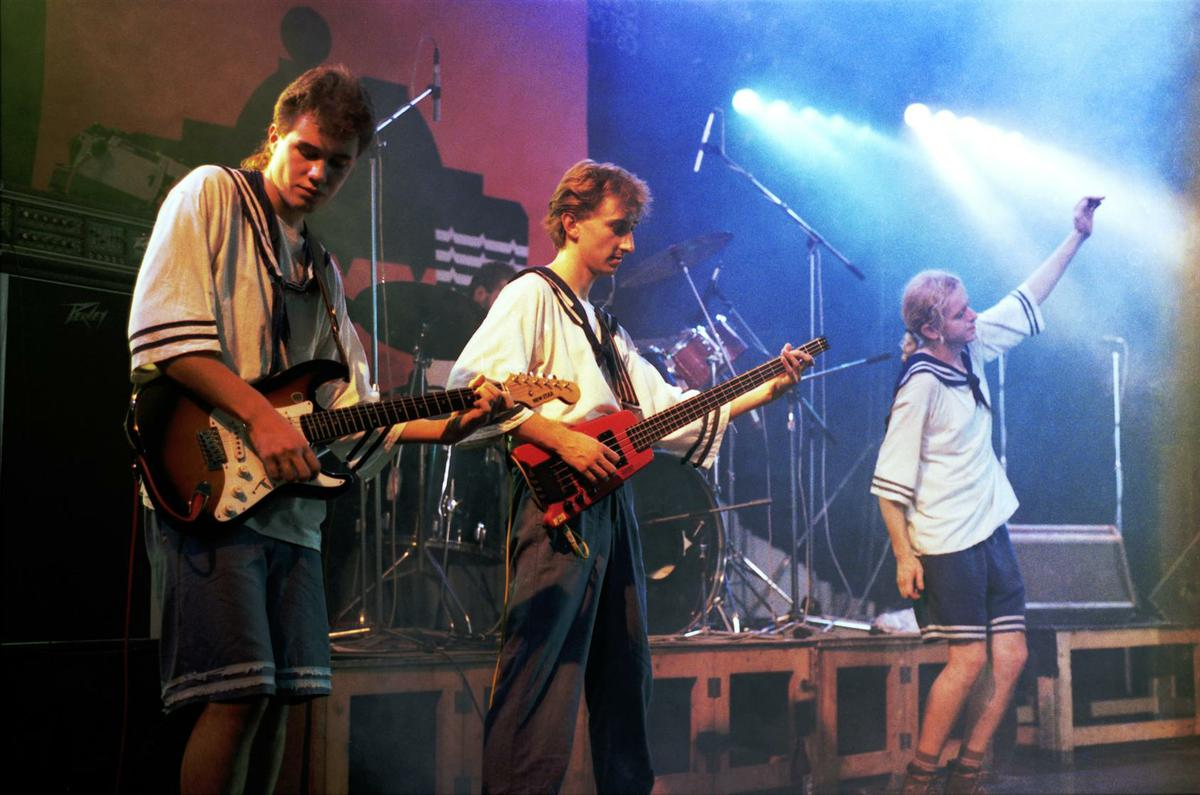
Mňága a Žďorp in 1992. From left: Koutný, Nekuža, Fiala

In July 1992, Mňága a Žďorp recorded their second album, Furt rovně. They invited a number of guest musicians to take part in the project, including Mikoláš Chadima, Miroslav Wanek, and members of the group Zuby Nehty. The album was released in October and the band went on an intensive tour to promote it.

In 1993, they returned to the studio to record their third album, Radost až na kost. They hired Ladislav Lučenič to produce the album, which was released in September.

In May 1994, Mňága a Žďorp released the album Valmez rock city, consisting of three songs that did not fit on Radost až na kost, five new songs, and the Katapult cover "Stovky hotelů". Instead of another concert tour, however, the band announced a break of several months and Petr Fiala began recording a solo album with the help of Karel Plíhal. Titled Nečum a tleskej! (vol. 2), the record was released in September, after which Mňága a Žďorp reunited and began playing shows again.

=== Return to music, film: 1995–99 ===
In July 1995, the band recorded the album Ryzí zlato, which was produced by Ivan Král. In the same year, together with director Petr Zelenka, they filmed the mockumentary Mňága – Happy end for Czech Television, to be released the following year.The film was accompanied by the soundtrack album Mňága: Happyend, which included songs originally written by Slepé střevo and Happyend. It was screened at several international film festivals, including the East Europe International Film Festival in Cottbus, Germany, the San Remo Film Festival, and the International Film Festival Rotterdam. It won an award at the Finále Plzeň Film Festival.

The band's next album, Bajkonur, was recorded in 1997 with the help of Buty's Petr Vavřík, and issued in September. Shortly after the release, guitarist Radek Koutný left to form his own band. He was soon replaced by Jaromír Mikel. Karel Mikuš fell ill the same year and was temporarily replaced by Pavel Fadrný, who eventually became the band's new drummer. 1999 saw the release of Chceš mě? Chci tě!, the band's seventh studio album, and the group followed it with another promotional tour.

=== New millennium, new releases: 2000–08 ===
Mňága a Žďorp began the new millennium with another album, this one titled Nic složitýho, followed a year later by their first retrospective record, The Best Of: Jen pro vlastní potřebu! They completed a domestic tour, then travelled to the United States to play a few shows to fans and Czech expats in Chicago, Denver, and Los Angeles.

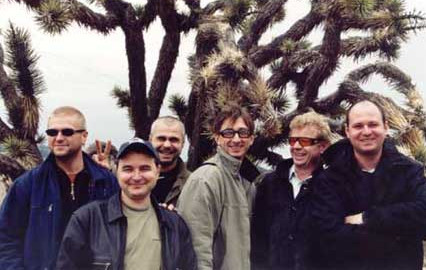
Mňága a Žďorp in the US, 2001

During their 2002 spring tour, drummer Pavel Fadrný was seriously injured and had to be temporarily replaced by Pavel Koudelka (Dunaj), who, in a repeat of Fadrný's previous situation, ended up staying with the band. At the beginning of July, the band lost another longtime member, saxophonist Lukáš Filip. He was later replaced by Roman Volný, who also played keyboards.

In 2003, the band, already without Volný, released the album Web site story, which was followed by a few shows in London. A year later, they hired a new saxophone player, Jiří Tibitanzl.

Petr Fiala released his second solo album in the spring of 2005, titled Je čas! In 2006, Mňága a Žďorp came out with their tenth record, Dutý, ale free, and two years later, their eleventh, Na stanici polární. The 3-disc compilation Platinum collection came out in 2008.

=== 25th anniversary and onward: 2010–present ===
In 2010, Mňága a Žďorp released their twelfth studio album, titled Takže dobrý, and the same year, they recorded their first live DVD at Prague's Lucerna, which they released under the name Mňága & Žďorp on stage. The second part of the video album includes the film Mňága – Happy end as well as all the band's music videos up to that point.

In 2012, on the 25th anniversary of the group's formation, they released the double CD Dáreček, which consisted of Mňága a Žďorp songs performed by various Czech and Slovak artists. Later the same year, the band issued the limited-edition Dáreček 2, consisting of songs that didn't fit on the first part. The album was a gift to fans who attended the band's sold-out show at Lucerna. Additionally, 2012 saw the release of another compilation, titled Výhledově (Best of 25 let), and a year later, Dáreček Live, a recording of the Lucerna show, was released on CD and DVD.

In 2014, Mňága a Žďorp launched a successful crowdfunding campaign to finance their next project, the album Made in China. They travelled to China to record it, and they also played several shows there.

In August 2016, drummer Pavel Koudelka left and was replaced by Marcel Gabriel. A year later, the band released the album Třínohý pes, followed by Třecí plochy in 2019.

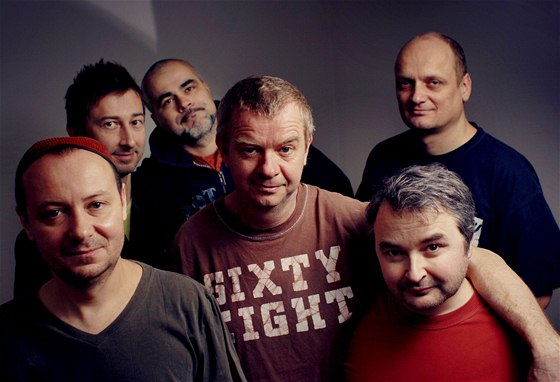
Mňága a Žďorp in 2016. From left: Tibitanzl, Nekuža, Mikel, Fiala, Knor, Koudelka

In 2020, due to the COVID-19 pandemic, Mňága a Žďorp were unable to tour, so instead they livestreamed an acoustic show from the Přístav pub in Valašské Meziříčí, and the recording was released as Přístav Unplugged.

In January 2024, the band announced that founding member Martin Knor had left.

The band won the award for Best Group at the 2025 Anděl Awards.

== Band members ==
Current

- Petr Fiala – vocals, guitar
- Petr Nekuža – bass, vocals
- Jaromír Mikel – guitar, vocals
- Jiří Tibitanzl – saxophone, keyboards, percussion, vocals
- Marcel Gabriel – drums

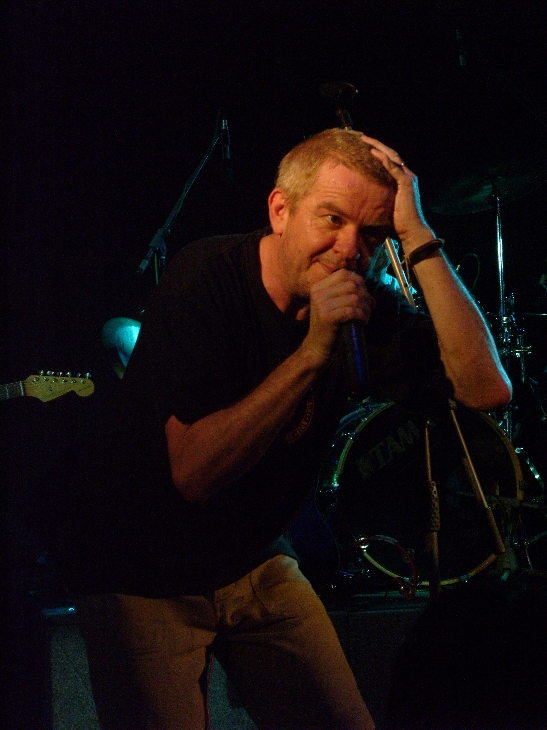
Petr Fiala in 2008

Past

- Ivo Chmelař – guitar, clarinet
- Radek Odstrčil – bass
- Karel Mikuš – drums
- Lukáš Filip – saxophone
- Jarek Pernický – saxophone
- Herbert Ullrich – bass, guitar
- Jiří Fiala – guitar
- Radek Koutný – guitar
- Pavel Fadrný – drums
- Pavel Koudelka – drums
- Roman Volný – saxophone, keyboards
- Martin Knor – guitar, mandolin

== Discography ==
Studio albums

- Made in Valmez (1991)
- Furt rovně (1992)
- Radost až na kost (1993)
- Valmez rock city (1994)
- Ryzí zlato (1995)
- Bajkonur (1997)
- Chceš mě? Chci Tě! (1999)
- Nic složitýho (2000)
- Web site story (2003)
- Dutý, ale free (2006)
- Na stanici polární (2008)
- Takže dobrý (2010)
- Dáreček (2012)
- Dáreček 2 (2012)
- Made in China (2014)
- Třínohý pes (2017)
- Třecí plochy (2019)

EPs

- Rock debut č. 8 (1990)

Soundtracks

- Mňága: Happyend (1996)

Compilations

- The Best Of: Jen pro vlastní potřebu! (2001)
- Platinum collection (2008)
- Výhledově (Best of 25 let) (2012)

Live albums

- Mňága & Žďorp on stage (2010)
- Přístav Unplugged (2020)

DVDs

- Mňága & Žďorp on stage (2010)
- Dáreček Live! (2013)
