= Zuby Nehty =

Czech rock band

- Origin: Prague, Czechoslovakia
- Genres: Rock; alternative rock; punk rock
- Years active: 1980–1986; 1987–2000; 2010–present
- Labels: Panton Records; Punc; Bonton; Indies Records
- Spinoffs: Malé Zuby
- Spinoff of: Plyn; Dybbuk
- Members: Pavla Jonssonová; Marka Míková; Kateřina Jirčíková; Alice Flesarová; Jana Modráčková
- Past members: Hana Řepová; Renata Špičanová; Dáša Seidlová; Vendula Kašpárková; Eva Trnková; Naděžda Bilincová; Tomáš Mika; Michal Pokorný; Jan Lorenc; Michal Lang; Klára Valentová; Petr Svoboda; Jana Modráčková; Martin Černý; Jarda Svoboda
- Website: zubynehty.cz

Zuby nehty (Czech: [ˈzubɪ ˈnɛxtɪ]) is a Czech alternative rock band formed in Prague in 1987 as continuation of the groups Plyn and Dybbuk. They have released eight studio albums over their career, as well as producing videos, theatre soundtracks, and three books of lyrics.

== History ==
=== Early years ===
==== Plyn (1980–1983) ====
The band Plyn was formed in Prague, Czechoslovakia, in 1980, by university students Pavla Fediuková (later Slabá, now Jonssonová), Hana Kubíčková (later Řepová), and Marka Horáková (later Míková). The group began rehearsing in their parents' apartments, with Horáková on piano, Fediuková on guitar, and Kubíčková using cardboard boxes as improvised drums. Horáková occasionally switched from piano to bass. They first performed in 1981, at the student clubs Eurydika and Strahov 007. Invitations to alternative festivals outside of Prague followed, including Ostrov nad Ohří, in 1983.

In 1983, the band attempted to pass the state-mandated examination required for public performance. The local cultural committee rejected them, describing their lyrics as depressive and "unsuitable for socialist youth". Plyn was subsequently blacklisted after its name appeared—alongside dozens of other new wave groups—on Radio Free Europe and Voice of America.

During this period, the band recorded with keyboardist Vendula Kašpárková at her family home in Milevsko. With this lineup, Plyn performed at Vokalíza, a major festival held in the Great Hall of Prague's Lucerna Palace.

==== Dybbuk (1984–1988) ====
In 1984, the band changed its name to Dybbuk—taken from Joseph Heller's novel Good as Gold. That year, they expanded, with the arrival of singer, flutist, and saxophonist Kateřina Nejepsová (later Jirčíková). In 1985, keyboardist Kašpárková left, and the group was rounded out by guitarist Eva Trnková, forming what became the band's most stable lineup. As a five-member ensemble, Dybbuk passed the state examinations for public performance, and they began performing regularly across Czechoslovakia.

Dissident musician Mikoláš Chadima circulated the band's recordings to activists associated with the Italian label Old Europa Cafe, who included Dybbuk's song "Kilgore Trout" on the 1984 compilation album Czech! Till Now You Were Alone. Three performances filmed at the Prague club Chmelnice were later included in the samizdat anthology Hudba 85, released on DVD in 2005. Dybbuk also performed at Rockfest, a major annual event held at the Palace of Culture and attended by roughly 35,000 people.

In 1987, music journalist Vojtěch Lindaur arranged for the band to record five tracks for Panton Records, released as Rock Debut 1 – Dybbuk. The EP featured the songs "Petr a Jan", "Mouchy", "Ve škole", "Panenství", and "Hadi". Later in 1987, Nejepsová, Kubíčková, and Trnková joined the women's band Panika, a move that brought Dybbuk to an end.

Communist-era surveillance of Plyn and Dybbuk is examined in Pavla Jonssonová's study "Punk – ženy – socialismus", published in the magazine Paměť a dějiny in 2025.

== Zuby nehty (1988–present) ==
Zuby nehty emerged in 1988, when Míková and Jonssonová began weekly rehearsals at Míková's home in Chodov, Prague. They were joined by poet and guitarist Naděžda Bilincová (Karfíková). During this period, Míková focused on piano, while Jonssonová switched to bass guitar. Poet Tomáš Míka, who also played saxophone, proposed the name Zuby nehty ("tooth and nail"). Later in 1988, the lineup expanded, with the addition of drummer Jan Lorenc and saxophonist Michal Pokorný.

The band made its public debut on 5 May 1989 at a FAMU student festival in the Great Hall of Lucerna Palace.

After the fall of communism, Miroslav Wanek of Už jsme doma produced an album of older Dybbuk material in the studio for the label Punc, releasing it as Ale čert to vem in 1991. Czech Television simultaneously produced a music video for the album, directed by Václav Kučera and filmed by Marek Jícha. During these sessions, the original Dybbuk members decided to continue performing under the name Zuby nehty.

=== 1990s: Touring and studio work ===
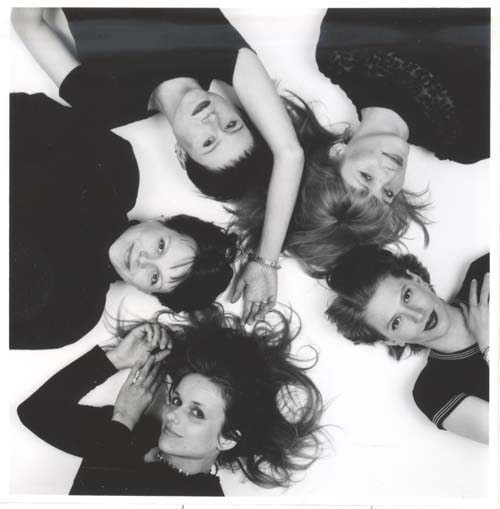
Král vysílá své vojsko album cover

With new opportunities to perform abroad, the band toured in Copenhagen, Amsterdam, Vienna, and Berlin. A second saxophonist, Alice Kalousková (later Flesarová), formerly of Už jsme doma, joined the group, helping establish Zuby nehty's distinctive two-saxophone sound.

The band signed with the Bonton label, which released the album Utíkej in 1993. Czech Television's Čestmír Kopecký produced the half-hour film Utíkej, všechny cesty vedou ven, directed by Václav Kučera, with cinematography by Marek Jícha. From 1993 to 1999, the German cultural organizer Gerhard Busse arranged regular international tours for the band, particularly in Germany, Austria, Switzerland, and Slovenia.

In 1995, Zuby nehty released what several critics described as their "magnum opus", Král vysílá své vojsko, which began their longterm collaboration with Indies Records. Dítkám followed in 1997

=== Late 1990s: Lineup changes and Loď odplouvá ===
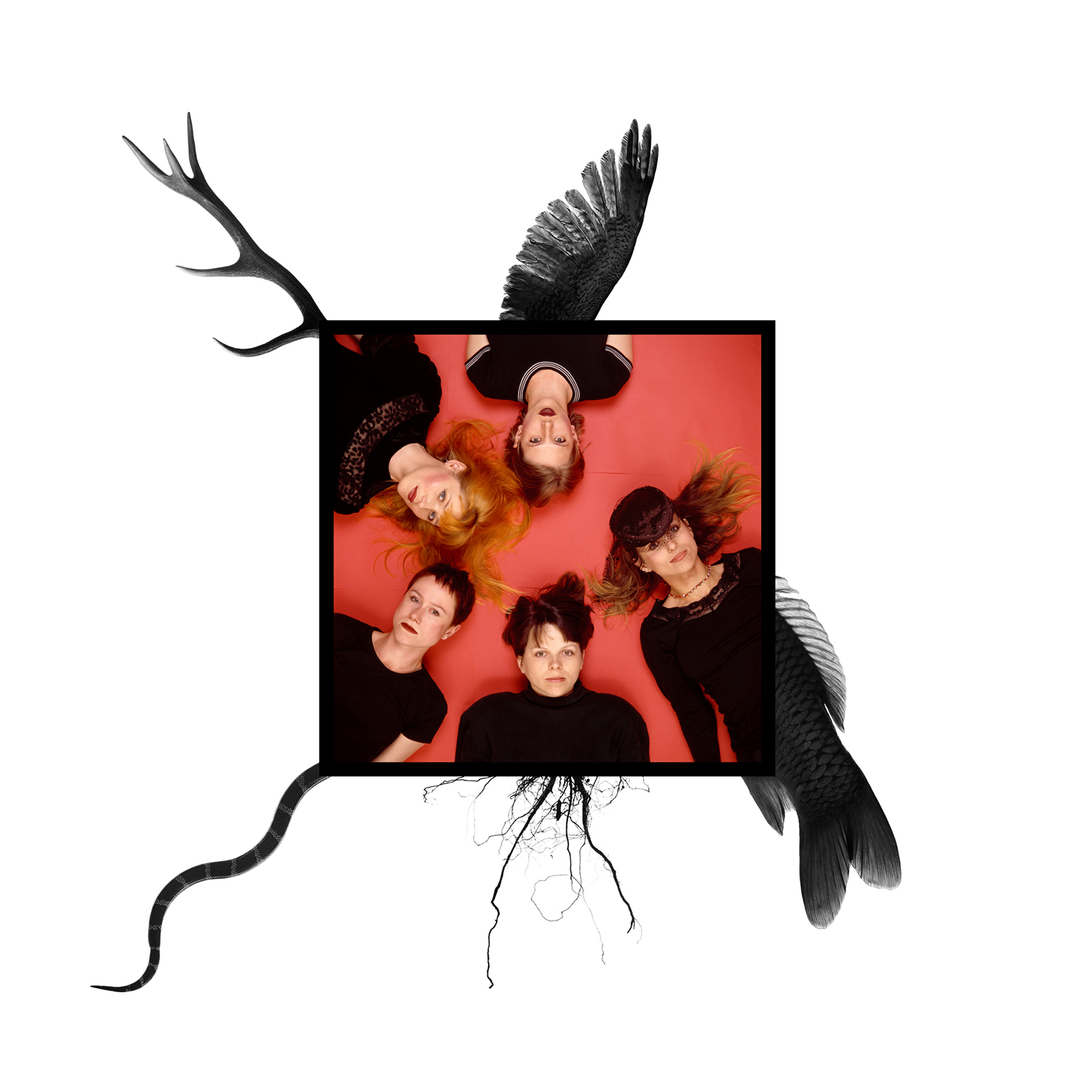
Loď odplouvá album cover

In 1998, Jonssonová received a Fulbright scholarship to the University of California, Santa Cruz, to research women and rock music; sound engineer Martin Černý substituted for her on bass during her stay in the United States. Guitarist Jarda Svoboda and drummer/trumpeter Jana Modráčková worked with the group on the album Loď odplouvá, released in 1999. A music video for the song "Kabelka" was filmed for Czech Television by Petr Slabý and Marek Jícha.

=== 2000–2009: Hiatus and occasional work ===
In 2000, the band ceased regular rehearsals and live performances, although its members continued to collaborate sporadically, particularly on soundtracks for Míková's children's theatre productions (Aisha, Bajaja, and others). Míková and Jonssonová continued occasional rehearsals. Several songs ("Zas", "Ale") were recorded for a B-side on Best of ... & Rarity (2003), alongside early live recordings from 1988 and theatre soundtracks.

=== 2010–present: Reunion and new recordings ===
Zuby nehty reunited in 2010 and were invited to the Czech Center in New York, performing alongside Už jsme doma. Patrick O'Donnell of Skoda Records filmed their concerts both in Czechia and the United States. A small U.S. tour followed, organized by Bryan Swirski, with appearances on local radio stations and clubs in New York, Washington, D.C., and New Jersey. A live session titled "White Birds" ("Bílí ptáci") was recorded at New Jersey's WFMU Radio in 2010 and later circulated online.

In New York City, Swirsky introduced the band to Vivien Goldman, who included a chapter on Zuby nehty in her book Revenge of the She-Punks (A Feminist Music History from Poly Styrene to Pussy Riot.

In 2011, Jonssonová temporarily left the group to complete her PhD, which she defended in 2013. Jan Maxa took over on bass, and the band released the album Kusy in 2014, going on to perform across Czechia as well as the Netherlands and Israel.

In 2015, they appeared at "Sbohem a řetěz", a memorial concert for Filip Topol, at the Archa Theatre in Prague.

In 2017, Míková and Jonssonová founded the small offshoot project Malé Zuby; drummer Jana Modráčková joined in 2020. The trio released the album Pouta with Indies in 2023.

In 2018, Zuby nehty performed at the anniversary concert "Starci na Chmelnici", celebrating groups associated with the 1980s Junior Club Na Chmelnici scene.

In 2021, the band recorded the album Srdce ven, with Jonssonová returning on guitar. As of 2025, they continue to perform, with Jonssonová on bass and Modráčková on drums.

Zuby nehty have been described as "one of the most distinctive women's bands on the Czech alternative scene".

== Band members ==
=== Zuby nehty core members (2025) ===
- Pavla Jonssonová – bass, vocals (1980–1998; 2010–present)
- Marka Míková – keyboards, vocals (1980–2000; 2010–present)
- Kateřina Jirčíková – saxophone, flute, vocals (1983–1988; 1991–1997; 2010–present)
- Alice Flesarová – saxophone, vocals (1991–1996; 2011–present)
- Jana Modráčková – drums, vocals (1997–2000; 2020–present)

=== Plyn ===
- Pavla Jonssonová
- Hanka Řepová
- Marka Míková

=== Dybbuk ===
- Pavla Jonssonová
- Hanka Řepová
- Marka Míková
- Kateřina Jirčíková
- Eva Trnková

=== Malé Zuby ===
- Marka Míková
- Pavla Jonssonová
- Jana Modráčková

=== Other past members ===
- Hanka Řepová – drums, vocals (1980–1997; 2010–2019)
- Renata Špičanová – saxophone (1980–1981)
- Dáša Seidlová – drums (1980–1981)
- Vendula Kašpárková – keyboards (1981–1983)
- Eva Trnková – guitar (1985–1988)
- Naděžda Bilincová – guitar (1988–1990)
- Tomáš Míka – saxophone (1988–1990)
- Michal Pokorný – saxophone (1988–1990)
- Jan Lorenc – drums (1988–1990)
- Michal Lang – drums (1988–1990)
- Klára Valentová – violin (1994–1997)
- Petr Svoboda – drums (1997)
- Martin Černý – bass (1998–2000)
- Jarda Svoboda – guitar (1998–2000)
- Jan Maxa – bass (2011–2024)

== Discography ==
=== Albums ===
- Ale čert to vem (as Dybbuk, 1991; reissued as Poletíme, 1998)
- Utíkej (1993)
- Král vysílá své vojsko (1995)
- Dítkám (1997)
- Loď odplouvá (1999) reissued in 2016 with Král vysílá své vojsko
- Best of ... & Rarity (compilation; 2003)
- Kusy (2014)
- Srdce ven (2021)

=== Compilation appearances ===
- Czech Alternative Music Vol. IV – "Ven paca" (from Dítkám, 1998)
- Indies Records 2004: Best of 15 Years – "Kobylka" (from Král vysílá své vojsko, 2004)

=== Other releases ===
- Live 85 Volume 1 (as Plyn/Dybbuk, 1985)
- Rock Debut 1 – Dybbuk (1986)
- Dybbuk – Live Na Chmelnici 1984 (as Dybbuk, 2023)
- Pouta (Malé Zuby; 2023)
