= Už jsme doma =

Czech progressive rock band

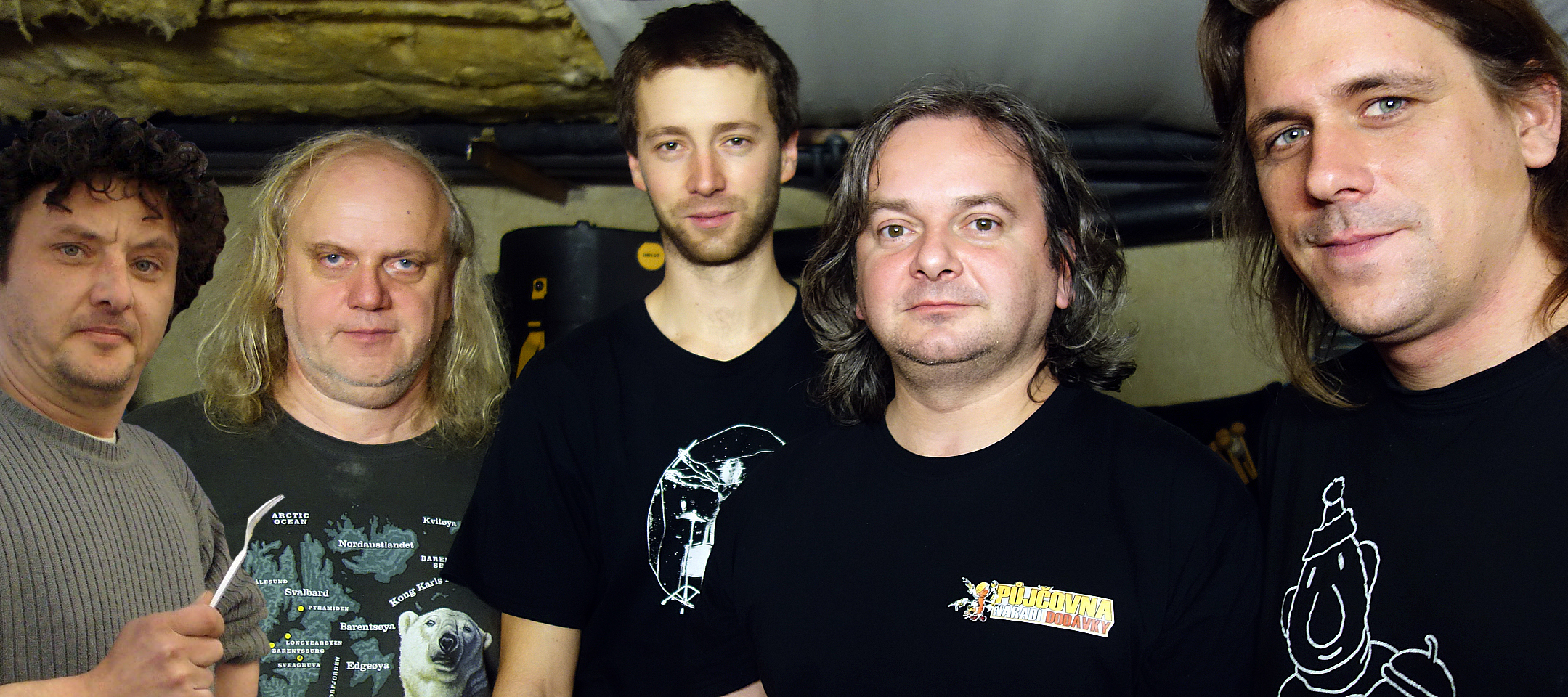
- Už jsme doma in 2016

Background information
- Origin: Teplice, Czechoslovakia
- Genres: Progressive rock; avant-garde; punk rock
- Years active: 1985–present
- Labels: Indies Records; Cuneiform; Skoda Records; Globus Int.; Panton
- Spinoff of: FPB
- Members: Miroslav Wanek; Martin Velíšek; Pepa Červinka; Adam Tomášek; Vojtěch Bořil
- Past members: See List of Už jsme doma members
- Website: uzjsmedoma.com

Už jsme doma (Czech pronunciation: [ˈuʃɪsmɛ ˈdoma], /ʊʃmeɪ ˈdoʊmə/) are a Czech progressive rock band from Prague who originally formed in Teplice in 1985. The Prague Post has termed them one of "the two great bastions of the Czech alternative scene" (along with Psí vojáci).

Cited musical influences include the Residents, the Damned, Ebba Grön, Pere Ubu, Uriah Heep, Omega, and the Rock in Opposition movement. Rolling Stone's David Fricke referred to them as "an amazing Czech quintet ... that rattled like a combination of Hot Rats-aphonic Frank Zappa and John Zorn's hyperjazz." Critics have also compared the band to Fugazi and Men at Work.

As of 2022, Už jsme doma has released eleven studio albums, two EPs, three live albums, one compilation album, as well as several video albums with documentary footage, and a pop-up book. The band's name literally translates to "we're home now" but idiomatically means "well, there you go" in Czech conversation.

Until the Velvet Revolution in Czechoslovakia in 1990, the band was considered illegal by the Communist state and was forced to hold secret concerts and risk arrest if caught.

== History ==
=== Early years (1985–1990) ===
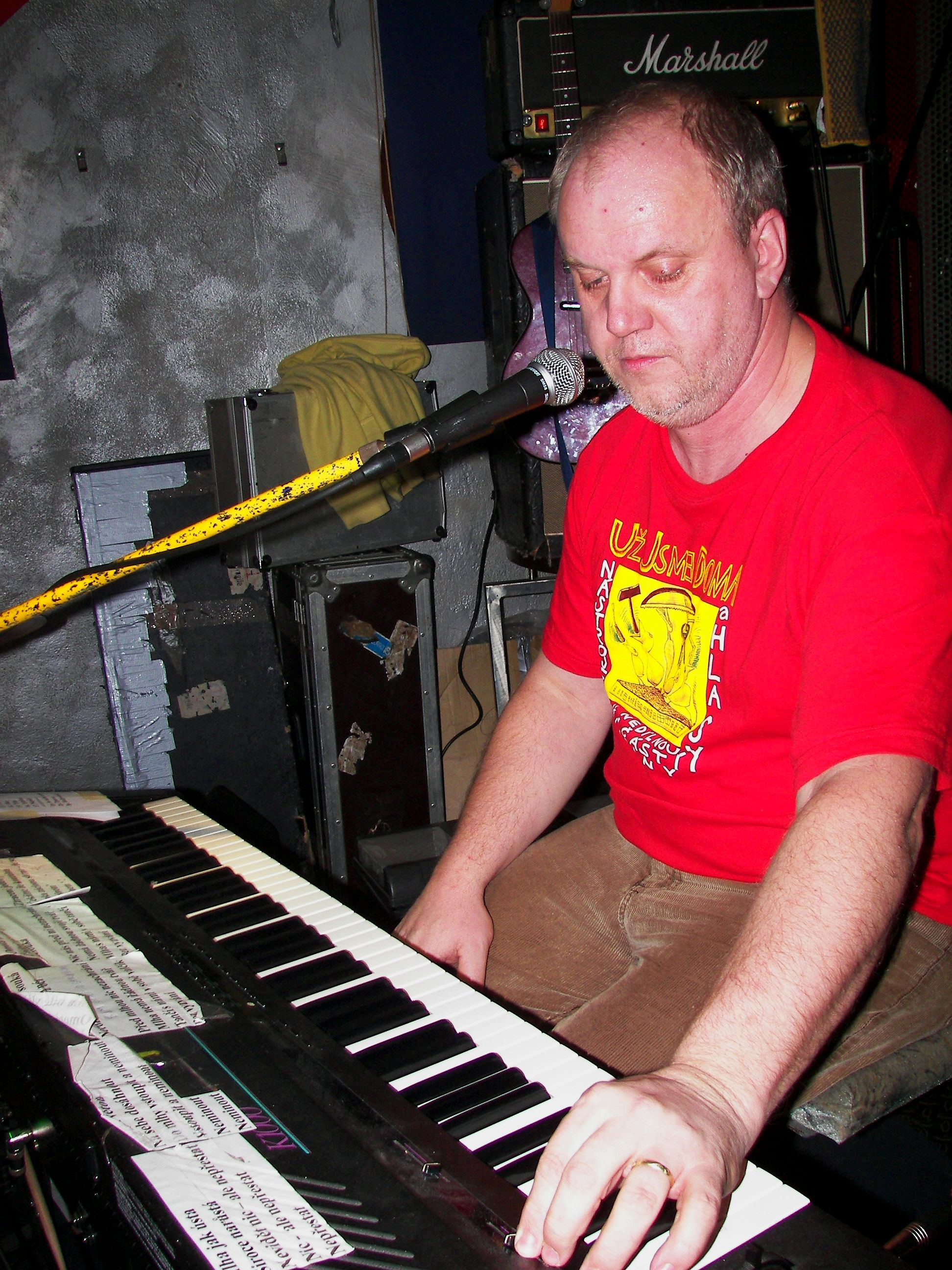
Primary composer Miroslav Wanek joined the group in 1986, initially as a guest member.

Už jsme doma was founded in 1985 in Teplice by saxophonists Jindra Dolanský and Milan Nový, drummer Jula Horváth, keyboardist Jiří Závodný, bassist Petr Keřka, and guitarists Ota Chlupsa and Jiří Solar. At the time, during the Communist era in Czechoslovakia, they were not legally permitted to play, as most types of music considered "Western" were banned. They played their first of several illegal concerts on a riverboat on 6 July 1985, with the punk bands FPB (which featured Nový on drums and several future members of Už jsme doma) and Plexis. By 1986, vocalist Miroslav Wanek and guitarist Romek Hanzlík, both from FPB, had joined, initially simply as guest members.

After a dissolution of the original incarnation in 1986, the group settled as a four-piece, featuring Wanek (bass and vocals), Hanzlík (guitar), Horváth (drums), and Dolanský (saxophone). The same year, the band first worked with painter Martin Velíšek, who designed a poster for them. Velíšek would go on to design all of the band's album art, as well as their posters and T-shirts.

By 1989, Horváth had been replaced by a returning Milan Nový. The band had also added saxophonists Alice Kolousková and Martina Fialová, the latter of whom only played with them for a short time, and shortly thereafter bassist Pavel Keřka (also formerly of FPB), which allowed Wanek to concentrate on singing and composing. This lineup, without Fialová, recorded the band's only pre-Velvet Revolution record, the three-song Rock Debut No. 7 EP, released by Panton Records. By the end of the year, Nový had left the band, emigrating to West Germany, and had been replaced by Pavel Pavlíček.

=== First three albums (1990–1995) ===
The band's first album, Uprostřed slov, was recorded in May 1990 and released on the Globus Int. label. Their second, Nemilovaný svět, was recorded in June 1992 and released on Panton Records. The first album included songs that owed a fair-sized debt to punk rock, while the second stood as the group's most orchestral and compositionally experimental album for years, featuring a host of guest musicians.

The early years of Václav Havel's regime marked a major change for the band in that they were able to not only play concerts legally, but also make a living off their music and thus involve themselves in a wide array of outside projects, including work with theatre groups.

In 1991, Kalousková left (she would later join the all-female group Zuby Nehty), and Wanek had begun playing second guitar and piano during live concerts. In 1993, Už jsme doma recorded Hollywood, their third album, which began to stray back towards harder-edged rock, while still incorporating progressive compositions. The band made its first appearance in North America in 1992. They continued to tour extensively, playing over eighty concerts in 1993 alone.

Hollywood marked the band's first record deal with a major Western label, BMG. Relations were short-lived, however, and the group, dissatisfied with BMG's distribution setup, began working with the Czech label Indies Records, whom they have remained with ever since.

In late 1993, Keřka and Pavlíček left and were replaced by Jan Cerha and a once-again returning Milan Nový, respectively. Under new management, Už jsme doma continued touring and began working on a new album. They also re-recorded the vocal tracks to Nemilovaný svět in English and released the reworked album on the American label Memphis Records, under the translated name Unloved World.

=== Pohádky ze Zapotřebí, collaborations with the Residents, Uši (1995–2000) ===
Už jsme doma released their fourth album, Pohádky ze Zapotřebí, in 1995. With Wanek receiving production credit, this record drifted deeper into the hard rock realm. Then band also recorded a soundtrack album to a 1995 documentary called Jaro, Peklo, Podzim, Zima. The film was based around the life and work of painter Martin Velíšek. Around this time Velíšek had been granted full membership in Už Jsme Doma. Still in 1995, Už jsme doma held a tenth-anniversary concert, which featured their new drummer, Petr Böhm. He would serve as the group's drummer for the next decade. The opening act of this performance came in the form of a reunion of the Wanek–Dolanský–Hanzlík–Horváth lineup who, calling themselves the UJD Revival Band, played a set of early Už Jsme Doma material while disguised in wigs and sunglasses.

Later in the year, another change in the rhythm section occurred, ushering in bassist Kamil Krůta to replace Cerha. Krůta was a notable fixture of the Teplice scene, having been in the post-Wanek/Hanzlík lineup of FPB that Nový and manager Petr Růžička put together in 1986. Krůta and Nový also played in the two-piece group Pseudo Pseudo.

In 1995, American avant-garde collective The Residents picked Už jsme doma as the backing band for a musical play based around their 1990 album, Freak Show. Wanek arranged live band versions for their complex, unique compositions, and Už jsme doma, along with other Czech musicians, performed these arrangements in the Freak Show theatre piece, with Wanek acting as conductor. The musical was performed twenty times at Prague's Archa theatre. The Residents later released selections from these performances on CD and DVD.

In 1996, Už jsme doma began working with American label Skoda Records, who issued Hollywood and, later, the rest of their back catalog. In Europe, Indies Records began re-releasing the four albums, which had fallen out of print. Hanzlík, the band's guitarist for ten years, left this same year to pursue a career in the business end of music with his agency AMP. He was replaced by young guitarist Radek Podveský. 1996 also saw the release of 11, a pop-up book with illustrations by Velíšek and prose by Wanek, detailing the band's career up to that point.

In 1997, Jan Čejka joined the group, replacing Krůta. This lineup toured extensively for three years. One live set was released as a live album, Vancouver 1997.

Už jsme doma's fifth studio record, Uši

In 1999, Už jsme doma released Uši, their fifth album. It was produced by Dan Rathbun, known for performing with the bands Idiot Flesh and Sleepytime Gorilla Museum, as well as production work on punk rock and experimental records.

=== No brass, Rybí tuk (2000–2005) ===
Už jsme doma began the twentieth century with the release of Patnáct Kapek Vody, a fifteen-track retrospective featuring three songs from each of their five albums. As a bonus, the disc included a track from the Jaro, Peklo, Podzim, Zima soundtrack and a live recording of the song "Jó Nebo Nebo", from their very first concert, in 1985.

In late 2001, after sixteen years in the band, Dolanský, saxophonist and only original member, left Už jsme doma. This left the band without their distinct saxophone sound, and new arrangements of old material used keyboard, guitar lines, and vocal melodies to replace it. Čejka also left the group at this time and was replaced by Jaroslav Cvach. His tenure was brief, however—after two years, he was followed by bassist Miloš Albrecht.

The band's next album was released in late 2003 under the name Rybí tuk. With Rathbun again recording but with production credit going to Wanek, the new material incorporated guest instrumentation and choir vocal layers, including appearances by members of Sleepytime Gorilla Museum, Tin Hat Trio, and Faun Fables.

Už jsme doma continued their hefty touring schedule. A live DVD, filmed during a 2003 Tokyo performance, was released as Uz jsme doma v Tokiu.

=== Commemorative releases, return of brass (2005–2010) ===
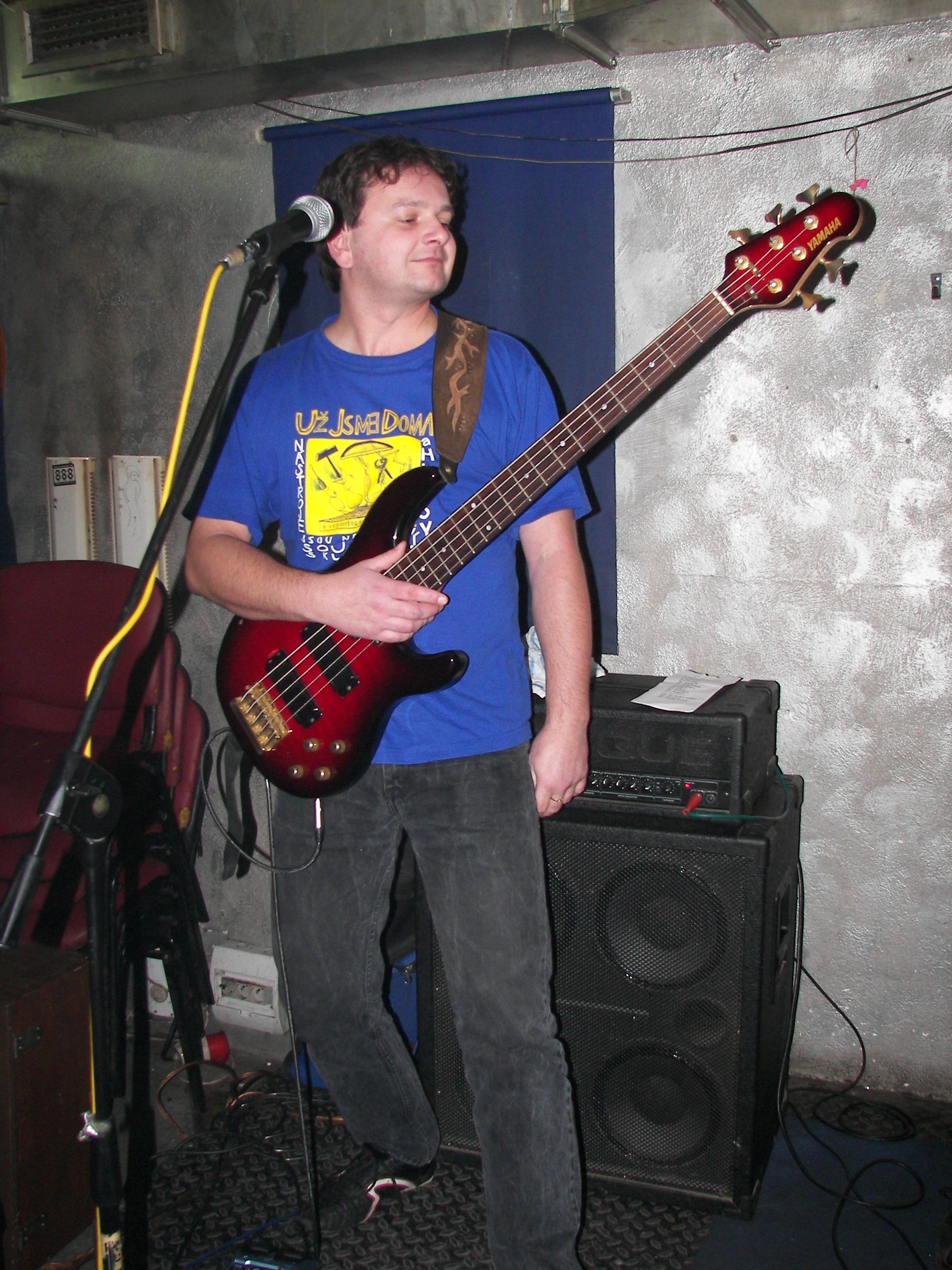
The ninth musician to play the instrument in the band, Pepa Červinka is Už jsme doma's longest-serving bassist.

In 2005, things took a surprising turn when Böhm, Podveský, and Albrecht all left the band simultaneously. Wanek was forced to fire the latter two, which led to the departure of Böhm, for financial reasons. After briefly questioning the future of the band, Wanek hired all new replacements —Pepa Červinka on bass, Petr Židel on guitar, and Tomáš Paleta on drums.

In October 2005, they performed a twenty-year anniversary set at the Archa theatre. The first half of this performance was a forty-minute medley of songs from 1985 to 1999, with guest appearances by various former members, including Dolanský, Alice Flesarová (née Kalousková), Závodný, early xylophonist Roman Kolařík, Čejka, Cvach, Hanzlík, and Böhm. The second half was performed by the then-current lineup, accompanied by a twenty-piece choir, Mikrochor. The performance was recorded and released as a live CD and DVD, titled 20 Letů.

In late 2006, Židel left after a short tenure, due to family obligations. The band was then rounded out by trumpet player Adam Tomášek, the first horn player in the band since Dolanský's departure. This also marked the first time the band had only one guitar player since the early 1990s. This new incarnation of the group debuted with a Polish tour, where they were met with "packed venues and enthusiastic responses from Polish audiences".

In October 2007, the band embarked on their fifteenth US tour, their first since 2001. Later in the year, Wanek collaborated with Czech drummer Pavel Fajt (of Pluto and Dunaj) on a sixty-page poem Wanek had written. The same year, Už jsme doma published the compilation Brno – město básníků.

In the latter half of 2008, Už jsme doma, consisting of Wanek, Hanzlík, Pepa Červinka (bass), Tomáš Paleta (drums), and Adam Tomášek (trumpet), began playing live sets of FPB songs under the name Už jsme doma a Romek Hanzlík hrají písně FPB (UJD and Romek Hanzlik play FPB songs), coinciding with the release of a 3-CD set of FPB material called Kniha přání a stížností.

Original drummer Jula Horvath died on 26 July 2009, and the group performed several tribute concerts in his honour. In November 2009, they embarked on their first tour of Australia and New Zealand. Late in the year, a live compilation DVD entitled Czech Music on the Road – 10 Days That Shook Japan was released, featuring material recorded on the group's 2008 tour of Japan with several other Czech groups.

=== Pohádky ze Zapotřebí remake and new releases (2010–present) ===
Už jsme doma released Jeskyně, their seventh studio album, in May 2010 and followed it up with a tour of the US. The band shared several dates on their touring bill with Zuby Nehty, marking the latter's first American shows.

Jaroslav Noga replaced Paleta on drums in September 2011 and a year later, Už jsme doma re-recorded and released the album Pohádky ze Zapotřebí under the name Pohádek ze Zapotřebí znovuudělání fortelné, with new arrangements and an expanded lineup.

The group celebrated its thirtieth anniversary in 2015 and released the album Tři křížky. The following year, Vojtěch Bořil replaced Noga on drums. The album Kry followed in 2018. Longtime member Romek Hanzlík died a year later.

== Band members ==
Current members

- Miroslav Wanek – lead vocals, guitar, keyboards, bass (1986–present)
- Pepa Červinka – bass, vocals (2005–present)
- Adam Tomášek – trumpet, vocals (2007–present)
- Vojtěch Bořil – drums (2016–present)
- Martin Velíšek – illustrations (1994–present)

== Discography ==
Studio albums

- Uprostřed slov (1990)
- Nemilovaný svět (1992)
- Hollywood (1993)
- Pohádky ze Zapotřebí (1995)
- Jaro, Peklo, Podzim, Zima (1996)
- Uši (1999)
- Rybí tuk (2003)
- Jeskyně (2010)
- Pohádek ze Zapotřebí znovuudělání fortelné (2012)
- Tři křížky (2015)
- Kry (2018)

EPs

- Rock Debut no. 7 (1989)
- Tříska split with ZZZZ (2004)

Live albums

- Vancouver 1997 (1997)
- 20 Letů (2006)
- Moravian Meeting (Už jsme doma & Randy – 2020)

Compilations

- Patnáct Kapek Vody (2000)

Video

- Už jsme doma v Tokiu (DVD – 2006)
- 20 Letů / Puding (2 DVDs – 2006)
- Czech Music on the Road – 10 Days That Shook Japan (DVD compilation – 2009)
- Jaro, peklo, podzim, zima (DVD – 2011)

Other

- 11 (pop-up book created by Miroslav Wanek, illustrated by Martin Velíšek, about the band – 1996)

Compilation appearances

- Roll Over Teplice (1990)
- Czeching In (1996)
- KFJC 89.7 FM: Live from the Devil's Triangle (1998)
- East Timor Benefit Album (1999)
- Brno – město básníků (2007)
