= Jindřich Dolanský =

Czech musician (born 1964)

- Born: 14 January 1964 (age 62); Czechoslovakia
- Genres: Avant garde, punk rock, rock
- Instruments: Saxophone, clarinet, vocals
- Years active: 1985–2001
- Labels: Škoda Records, Indies Records
- Formerly of: Už jsme doma

Jindřich "Jindra" Dolanský (born 14 January 1964) is a Czech musician. He was the saxophone player, backup vocalist and co-composer for the Czech avant garde punk rock group Už jsme doma from 1985 to 2010.

== Career ==
In the early 1980s, Dolanský became a fixture in the music scene in Teplice, Czech Republic. He was trained on the clarinet in his youth, making him the only trained member of the original Už jsme doma lineup, which he formed with six friends in 1985. By the end of 1988, he was the only original member remaining. From 1985, he played in the band led by Miroslav Wanek, until he decided to leave the exhausting lifestyle to focus on his family in 2010. He has since performed with the band on special occasions, most notably their 20th anniversary set, which was released as a live CD and DVD, although only one track featuring Dolanský appears on the former.

Dolanský also performs on the album Fancy, by the Oakland, California, avant garde/rock act Idiot Flesh. He plays saxophone on the religious snack-food commercial spoof track "Cheezus."'

In early 1990s, he collaborated with the band "Veselé plavkyně z Miami Beach", found by former UJD bassplayer Pavel Keřka and younger Dolanký's brother Ivo Dolanský on guitar (former FPB player). There are two recordings left, one is the album Roll Over Teplice, where Dolanský (Jindřich) performs on sax in four songs, and demo recording of several songs (approx. 12), which was never released.
