= Martina Trchová =

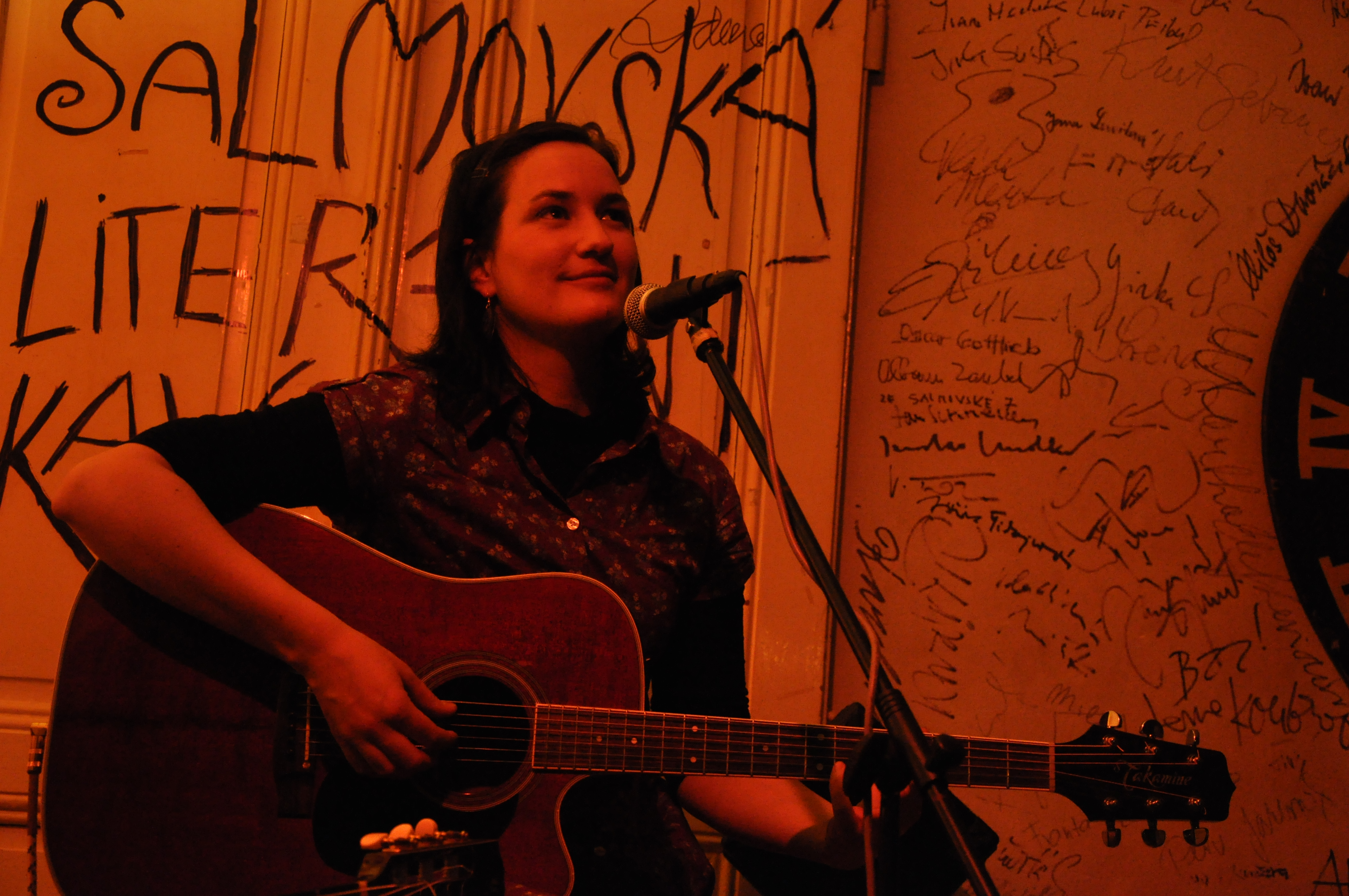
- Trchová performing in 2010

Background information
- Birth name: Martina Trchová
- Born: 14 February 1983 (age 42); Prague, Czechoslovakia
- Occupation: Singer
- Years active: 2000–present
- Labels: Indies Records

Martina Trchová (born 14 February 1983) is a Czech singer. Her 2016 album Holobyt, which can be translated into English as Unfurnished Flat, won the Folk & Country category at the 2016 Anděl Awards.

== Discography ==
=== Studio albums ===
- 2005: Čerstvě Natřeno
- 2010: Takhle ve mně vyjou vlci
- 2016: Holobyt
