= Věra Bílá =

Czech vocalist and musician (1954–2019)

- Born: 22 May 1954; Rokycany, Czechoslovakia
- Died: 12 March 2019 (aged 64) Plzeň, Czech Republic
- Occupation: Musician
- Years active: 1970–2019

Věra Bílá (22 May 1954 – 12 March 2019) was a Czech vocalist and musician of Romani ethnicity. She initially gained acclaim performing Romani folk and pop songs and was the lead singer of the Czech recording act Kale with whom she performed songs in Romani, Czech, and Slovak. She was highly acclaimed, toured internationally and was often called the "Ella Fitzgerald of Gypsy music" or the "Queen of Romany"

== Biography ==
Bílá, a Rokycany native, was the daughter of singer Karol Giňa. She lived and worked in the Czech Republic. In 1999 director Mira Erdevicki-Charap portrayed Bílá in the documentary Black and White in Colour.

Bílá died on 12 March 2019, aged 64 of a heart attack.

== Recordings ==
- Věra Bílá & Kale – C'est comme ca
- Věra Bílá – Queen Of Romany
- Věra Bílá & Kale – Rovava
- Věra Bílá & Kale – Kale Kalore
- Věra Bílá & Kale – Rom-Pop (produced by Zuzana Navarová)
