= Uši =

1999 studio album by Už jsme doma

Studio album by Uz jsme doma
- Released: 9 November 1999
- Genre: Progressive rock; avant-garde; punk rock
- Label: Skoda
- Producer: Dan Rathbun

Uz jsme doma chronology
Vancouver 1997 (1997)	Uši (1999)	Rybí tuk (Codliver Oil) (2003)

Uši is the sixth studio album by the Czech progressive rock band Už jsme doma. It was released in 1999 via Skoda Records.

The record was an American breakthrough for the band and also marked the first time that they had worked with an American producer. A 2000 tour in support of the album coincided with the band's fifteenth anniversary.

== Production ==
Uši was produced by Dan Rathburn, of the band Idiot Flesh.

== Critical reception ==
Professional ratings
Review scores
Source	Rating
AllMusic	3/5 stars
The Province	2.5/5 stars

Francois Couture, in an AllMusic review, wrote that producer "Dan Rathbun captured the band members' live energy while allowing them an ample sound for their more symphonic inclinations." CMJ New Music Monthly stated that "a studied roughness continues to creep into the kinetic art-rock/jazz/ethnic/punk/chamber pop fusion theorized by key personnel Miroslav Wanek and Jindra Dolansky."

The San Diego Union-Tribune wrote that the album "features noodling guitars ("Oko"), thick bass riffs ("Bosi") and epic jams (Usi") —all of which the band delivers with its own distinct style." The Province opined that "the band rocks like almost no other artist since Frank Zappa or Soft Machine."

== Track listing ==
All lyrics are written by Miroslav Wanek.

No.	Title	Length
1.	"Bosí"	2:24
2.	"Tenký Led"	3:46
3.	"Kovbojská"	4:12
4.	"Oko"	3:58
5.	"Uši"	8:27
6.	"Strach"	3:18
7.	"Pot"	5:13
8.	"Řeka"	4:03
9.	"Ticho"	5:09
