= Bonton Group =

Czech media and entertainment company

Bonton Group is a media and entertainment holding company in the Czech Republic established in 1990 by co-Presidents Zdenek Kozak and Mick Hawk. The company's first product was Czech President Václav Havel reading one of his own plays. Bonton Group grew from the Bonton Music record label established in May 1989 by Czech jazzman Martin Kratochvíl, who became chairman.

By the late 1990s group sales reached US$50 million, and Bonton had established itself as a market leader in the Czech Republic in film, music, broadcasting and video. It operated the largest music retailer, was exclusive film distributor of major Hollywood films, and even produced the first privately made Czech film Tank Brigade (1991) which set box office records.

Sales reached US$200 million before the company was largely deconsolidated in 2012. In 2014 Hawk led a group which reacquired Bonton's film production and distribution business.

== Holdings ==
- Albatros nakladatelství, a.s. – book publisher
- Ateliéry Bonton Zlín a.s. – filmateliérs
- AZ Rádio, s.r.o. – regional radio (now Rock Max)
- Bonton Music a.s. – music label; merged with Sony Music into Sony Music / Bonton. In 2003 Sony Music bought out the shares of Bonton
- Bontonfilm a.s. – film production and distribution, later divided into Alfa a Beta
- Bonton Home Entertainment
- Bonton Home Video, a.s. – video distributor
- Centrum Českého Videa, a.s. – distribuce českých filmů
- Bontonland, a.s. – prodejny médií
- Bonton Promotions, a.s.– propagace
- Bonton Plus a.s. – podpůrná společnost
- Bonton Online a.s. – internet company (dříve Bonton TV, dnes Supraphon)
- Cinema – film magazine
- Hybernia a.s. – theatre company
- Panther, akciová společnost – distribution media
- Radio Bonton akciová společnost – Prague, later multiregional radio station, after the collapse of the holding company was renamed new Italian owner on Radio DeeJay, now, after another ownership change again Radio Bonton
- Supraphon a.s. – record label; also labels Panton and Ultraphon
