= Dunaj (band) =

Czech rock band

- Also known as: Kolektiv, Iva Bittová a Dunaj, Pustit musíš
- Origin: Brno, Czechoslovakia
- Genres: Alternative rock; avant-garde; art rock; rock
- Years active: 1986–1991, 1992–1998, 2002, 2018–present
- Labels: Indies Records; Rachot; Bonton Records; Panton Records
- Members: Josef Ostřanský; Vladimír Václavek; Pavel Koudelka
- Past members: Jiří Kolšovský; Pavel Fajt; Iva Bittová; Pavel Richter; Zdeněk Plachý; Václav Bartoš

Dunaj are a Czech alternative/art rock band from Brno active initially between 1986 and 1998 and reformed in 2018. The band has included such musicians as Iva Bittová and Pavel Fajt and influenced many Czech artists, with AllMusic critic François Couture calling their 1991 sophomore album, Rosol, "the blueprint for the future music of [...] most of the Czech avant rock scene". The band's name translates in English to "Danube", referring to the river of this name.

== History ==
=== Early years, first two albums (1986–1991) ===
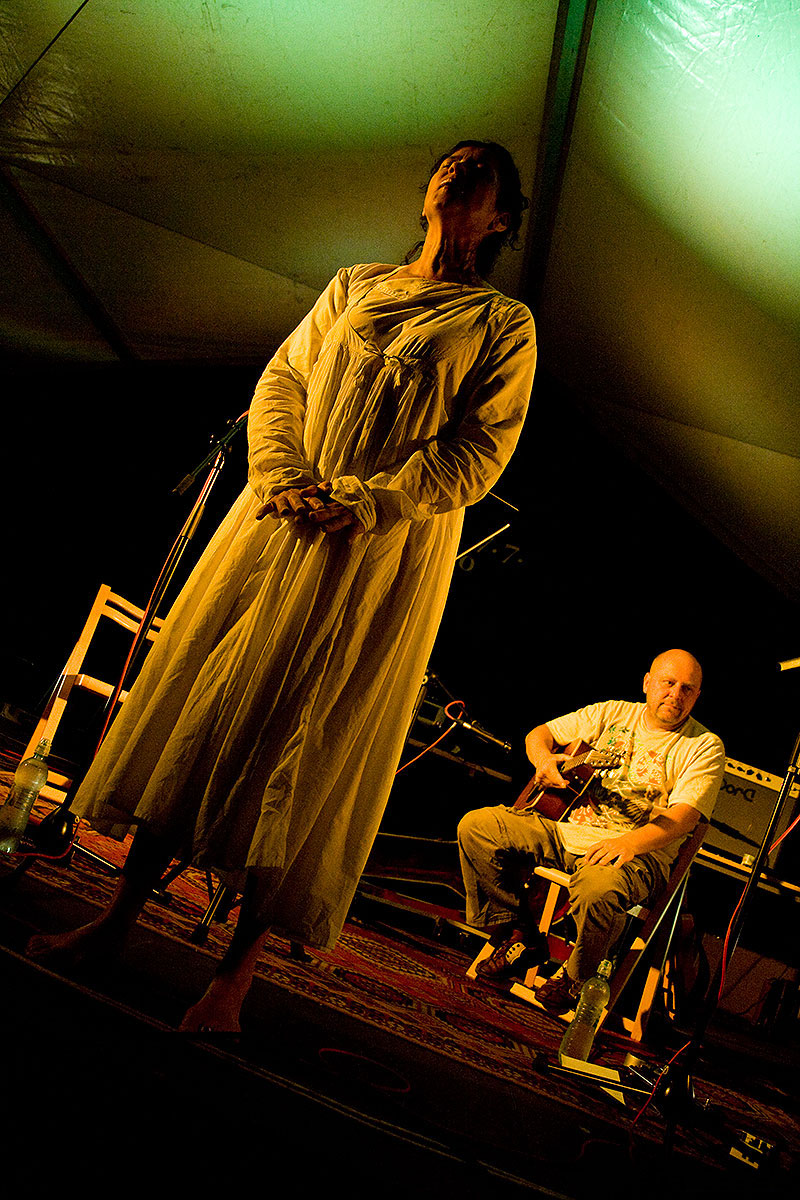
Iva Bittová and Vladimír Václavek (shown here) are among Dunaj members with active solo careers.

Initially known as Kolektiv, the group began performing in 1986. The lineup included vocalists Bittová and Jiří Kolšovský, guitarists Josef Ostřanský and Pavel Richter, bassist Vladimír Václavek, and drummer Fajt. The group, all members of which were active in other projects, performed only sporadically at the time.

Fajt and Bittová collaborated on the Svatba (The Wedding) album in 1987, which was successful internationally. This led to the international re-release of their first collaborative LP from 1985. Following this, the band decided to record their material. They changed their name to Dunaj in 1989, released their debut record Dunaj a Bittová, and performed a handful of well-received concerts.

Bittová and Richter left shortly after this period, with Kolšovský becoming the band's lead vocalist. Zdeněk Plachý also briefly joined as the group's keyboardist, performing on the group's second album, Rosol (Jelly). This album was released in 1991 on the Pavian Records label, shortly after the Velvet Revolution. Couture called the album "one of the band's most powerful achievements" and "a collection of memorable avant prog rock anthems" that is "an essential". They temporarily disbanded after the album's release.

=== Dudlay through La La Lai, breakup (1992–1998) ===
In 1992, the band reformed in its third and longest-lasting incarnation, including Kolšovský, Václavek, Ostřanský, and new drummer Pavel Koudelka (Mňága a Žďorp). They recorded and released their third record, Dudlay, in 1993. The following year, they issued their next record, IV.

The four members were briefly rejoined by Bittová and Fajt in 1995. This lineup re-recorded their debut album and released it, along with new material, as Pustit musíš. The band toured in this incarnation prior to returning to the four-piece lineup and recording La La Lai in 1996. The group disbanded in 1998, shortly before Kolšovský's death. All surviving members remained active in the Czech music scene.

=== Later activity and reunions (2001–present) ===
Indies Records re-released Rosol in 2001 with bonus live material. In 2002, the group played a series of reunion concerts featuring participation from most members. Václav Bartoš, singer of Fajt's group Pluto, replaced Kolšovský for these performances.

Beginning in 2015, Ostřanský and Václavek began performing Dunaj material together live in the group Dunajská vlna with drummer Michaela Antalová. Later that year, Dunajská vlna released the album Jednou, featuring new recordings of songs from all five Dunaj LPs. Critics praised the album's clean, minimalist sound.

In 2018, Ostřanský, Václavek, and Koudelka officially reformed Dunaj. The trio began performing old material and writing new songs, while a film about the band also began production. Later that year, Plachý died unexpectedly after a prolific career in music and theater. In the years that followed, both Fajt and Bittova returned as guests.

== Discography ==
- Dunaj a Bittová (1989)
- Rosol (1991) (re-released in 2001)
- Dudlay (1993)
- IV (1994)
- Pustit musíš (1995)
- La La Lai (1996)
- Za Vodou (2022)

== Band members ==
Current

- Josef Ostřanský – guitar, vocals (1986–1991, 1992–1998, 2002, 2018–present)
- Vladimír Václavek – bass, guitar, vocals (1986–1991, 1992–1998, 2002, 2018–present)
- Pavel Koudelka – drums (1992–1998, 2002, 2018–present)

Former

- Jiří Kolšovský – vocals, guitar (1986–1991, 1992–1998; died 1998)
- Pavel Fajt – drums, percussion (1986–1991, 1995, 2002; 2019 as guest)
- Iva Bittová – vocals, violin (1986–1989, 1995, 2002; 2022 as guest)
- Pavel Richter – guitar (1986–1989)
- Zdeněk Plachý – keyboards (1991; died 2018)
- Václav Bartoš – vocals (2002)

Timeline
