= FPB (band) =

Czech punk rock band

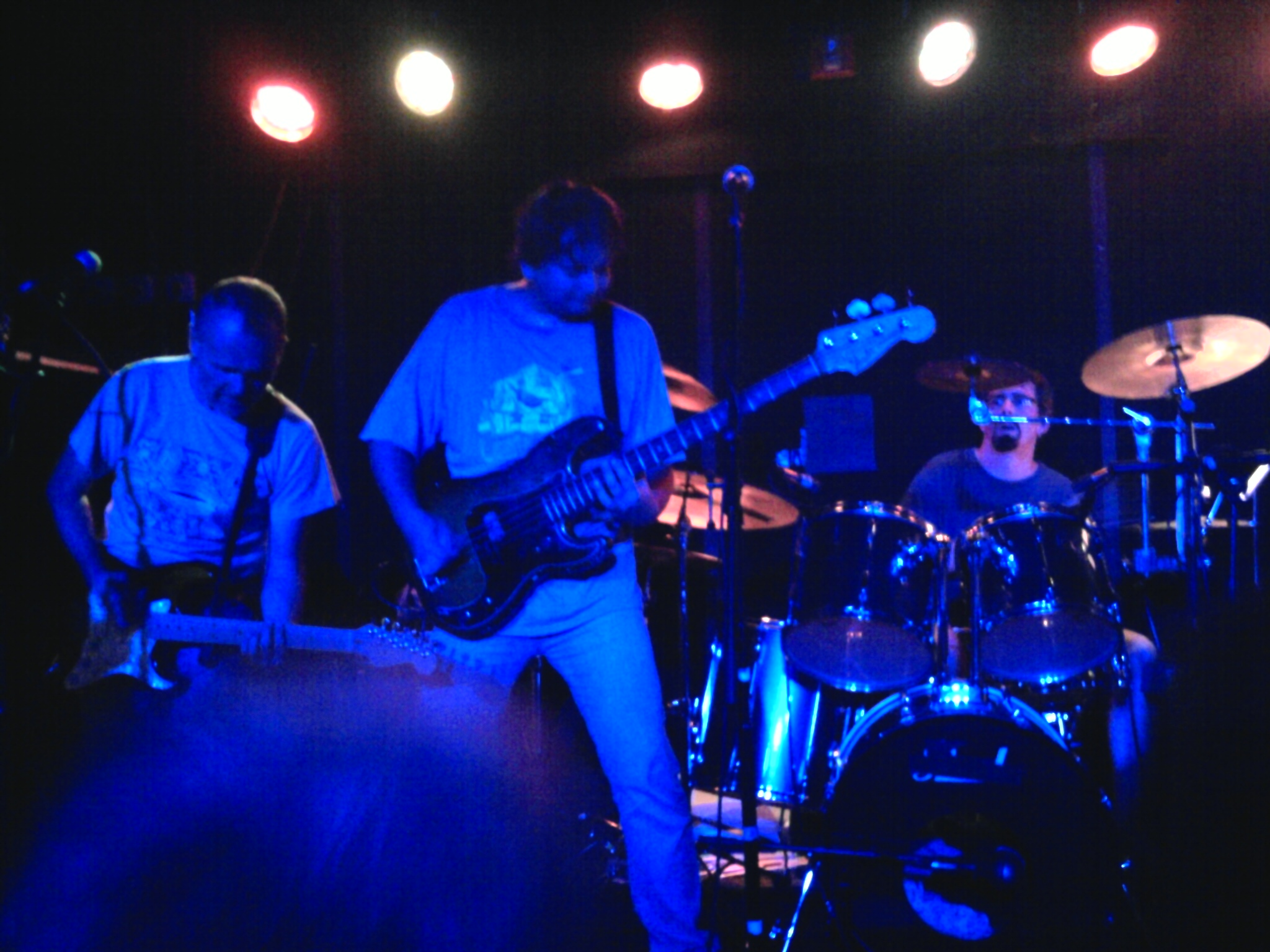
- FPB performing in 2010

Background information
- Also known as: Fourth Price Band; Čtvrtá cenová skupina; Čtverecjeď; New FPB
- Origin: Teplice, Czechoslovakia
- Genres: Punk rock
- Years active: 1980–1987, 1990, 2008–present
- Spinoffs: Už Jsme Doma, Pseudo Pseudo
- Members: Miroslav Wanek; Pepa Červinka; Adam Tomášek; Vojtěch Bořil
- Past members: Jaroslav Machovský; Jan Knap; Petr Kuranda; Petr Růžička; Milan Nový; Romek Hanzlík; Ota Chlupsa; Ivo Dolanský; Pavel Keřka; Kamil Krůta; Radek Uhlíř; Jaroslav Noga

FPB, short for Fourth Price Band, is a Czech punk rock band formed in 1980 in Teplice by bassist, singer, and poet Miroslav Wanek and his friend Petr Růžička, who acted as the band's manager. The two were joined by drummer Milan Nový and later, guitarist Romek Hanzlík. The group moved through several lineups before splitting up in 1987. The fact of playing punk rock in the early 1980s in a Communist nation drew much attention to the band, but the group was also notable for integrating musical complexity and poetry into a traditional punk style. They often used different monikers to confuse the police, including FPB, Fourth Price Band, Čtvrtá cenová skupina, and Čtverecjeď. FPB briefly reformed in 1990 and again in 2008. They are sporadically active to this day.

== History ==
=== Formation and early lineups (1980) ===
The band was formed in 1980 by Wanek and his neighbor Růžička, an organizer of illegal concerts who had done minor jail time for his involvement in the underground music scene. They named themselves Fourth Price Band, or FPB, for short. A "fourth price group" was a term used in socialist Czechoslovakia for the lowest of four pub levels. The idea behind the name was that the band wasn't first- or second-rate, but rather at the bottom, or underground. The Communist Czech government at the time was very strict about which musical artists were allowed to perform, and starting a group without government sanction was a complicated procedure. The duo found drummer Milan Nový, who invited several bandmates from his group Mikron. This lineup lasted for a few months and played one show, before most members were intimidated by government pressure, and the band was reduced to Wanek, Nový, and Růžička.

=== Classic lineup (1981–1985) ===
After several months as essentially a two-piece, Wanek invited his former schoolmate Romek Hanzlík to join FPB. This became the core lineup for the band during the years 1981–1985. Despite the complicated logistics, the band played frequently and gained popularity in the Czech punk scene.

In 1985, Nový had co-founded a more experimental seven-piece band called Už Jsme Doma, in which he played saxophone. Wanek took an immediate liking to the group, who frequently shared illegal concert bills with FPB. In 1986, Wanek and Hanzlík were invited to join UJD, at first as guests, while UJD were experiencing personnel problems. When a four-piece lineup of UJD, with Wanek and Hanzlík but without Nový, solidified at the end of the year, Wanek and Hanzlík decided to focus on the new band and quit FPB.

=== New FPB (1986–1987) ===
Růžička opposed retiring the FPB moniker, so he and Nový put together a new lineup, featuring Kamil Krůta (guitar) and Radek Uhlíř (bass and vocals), both of whom were involved with the Czech punk band Šanov 1 and mere teenagers at the time. This incarnation, commonly known as New FPB and playing a mix of Wanek's FPB songs and new material, lasted for two years before dissolving.

=== Reformations and subsequent activity (1990, 2008–present) ===
In 1990, after the Velvet Revolution, Wanek, Hanzlík, and Nový reunited as FPB to record seventeen songs from their 1981–85 repertoire, which were released on the album Kdo z koho, ten toho. The band also played one show at Lucerna in Prague.

After New FPB broke up in 1987, Nový and Krůta put together a two-piece group called Pseudo Pseudo, which was active for a number of years. Hanzlík played in UJD from 1986 to 1997, before retiring from performing to work as a manager and band promoter. Wanek continued to play in UJD. Nový had three stints in UJD—as sax player from 1985 to 1986, drummer from 1988 to 1989, and again from 1995 to 1996. Krůta briefly played bass with UJD, from 1996 to 1997.

In 2008, a concert of classic FPB material was performed by Wanek, Hanzlík, and members of UJD—bassist Pepa Červinka, drummer Tomáš Paleta, and trumpet player Adam Tomášek. This performance coincided with the release of Kniha přání a stížností, a 3-CD set of FPB material. Although this concert, called Už jsme doma a Romek Hanzlík hrají písně FPB (UJD and Romek Hanzlik play FPB songs), was originally intended as a one-off, the five-piece band (with Jaroslav Noga on drums) performed occasional festival gigs and other special events thereafter. Romek Hanzlík died in 2019.

== Band members ==
Current

- Miroslav Wanek – bass, vocals (1981–1985, 1990); guitar, vocals (2008–present)
- Pepa Červinka – bass, vocals (2008–present)
- Adam Tomášek – trumpet, vocals (2008–present)
- Vojtěch Bořil – drums (2016–present)

Past

- Jaroslav Machovský – guitar (1980)
- Jan Knap – bass (1980)
- Petr Kuranda – bass (1981)
- Petr Růžička – manager (1981–1987)
- Milan Nový – drums (1981–1987, 1990)
- Romek Hanzlík – guitar, vocals (1981–1985, 1990, 2008–2019)
- Ota Chlupsa – guitar (1983)
- Ivo Dolanský – guitar (1983–85)
- Pavel Keřka – bass (1983–85)
- Kamil Krůta – guitar (1986–1987)
- Radek Uhlíř – bass, vocals (1986–1987)
- Jaroslav Noga – drums (2011–2016)

== Discography ==
Studio albums

- Raná léta (1987)
- Jedem v punku jako v tanku (1984, 1987)
- Kdo z koho, ten toho (1990)
- Kniha prani a stiznosti (3CD – 2008)

Live albums

- Live v Gongu (1984)
- Opatov – live (1985)

Compilations

- 1984 třetí (1987)
- Razie (1987)
- Hrubý punkový hláska (1987)
- Československo (deset československých let 1978–1988) (1989)
