= Mikoláš Chadima =

Czech musician and composer (born 1952)

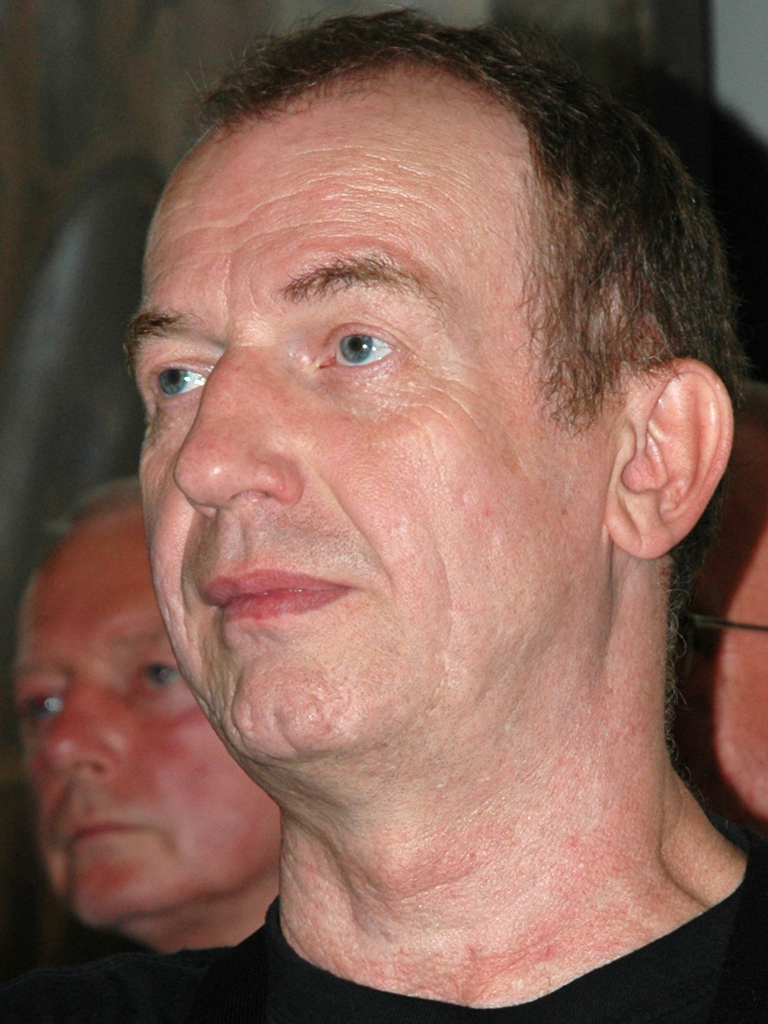
- Mikoláš Chadima in 2013

Background information
- Born: 9 September 1952 (age 73); Cheb, Czechoslovakia
- Occupations: Musician, composer
- Instruments: Vocals, saxophone, guitar, flute
- Years active: 1969–present

Mikoláš Chadima (born 9 September 1952 in Cheb) is a Czech musician and composer.

== Life and career ==
Besides singing he plays saxophone, guitar, flute and harmonica. His early bands include The Three Fellows, Purple Fleas, Petroleum Company, Yellow Defect, Inrou and Elektrobus. In 1976, he joined JJ Neduha's band Extempore. He became a leader of the band after Neduha's leaving two years later. He founded his own band MCH Band in 1982. He also collaborated with Pavel Fajt and Mňága a Žďorp. In 1985, he wrote a book called Alternativa which was originally published in samizdat.

In 1979, he signed Charter 77.

His father Jiří Chadima (1923) is a painter.
