= Jarda Svoboda =

Czech musician (born 1966)

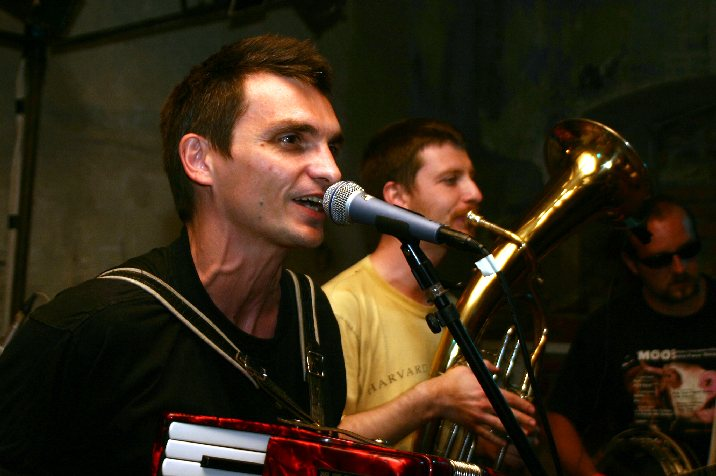
Traband from left: Jarda Svoboda, Jakub Schmid and Evžen Kredenc

Jaroslav "Jarda" Svoboda (born 31 May 1966 in Kolín) is a Czech singer, guitarist, lyricist and composer best known as the frontman of the bands Otcovy děti and Traband.

== Biography ==
A self-taught musician, he studied art and Czech language at Charles University in Prague and worked as an elementary school teacher. He has worked many other various jobs such as bartender, stoker, director of a music club, Teletext editor and social worker. In 1988, together with the priest and musician Svatopluk Karásek, he founded the band "Otcovy děti" ("Father's Children"), an ensemble dealing with primarily Christian and Jewish spiritual themes, although Svoboda himself belongs to no specific church.

After leaving Otcovy děti, in 1995 he founded the current band, Traband, in which he plays multiple instruments (guitar, accordion, clarinet, keyboards) and is the lead singer. He also writes lyrics for and composes most of the band's repertoire. In recent years three of Traband's albums Hyjé! ("Giddy-up!"), Přítel člověka ("Friend of Man") and Domasa won the annual Anděl Award" of the Czech Academy of Popular Music in the "world music" and "folk and country" category.
