= Zuzana Navarová =

Czech singer and composer

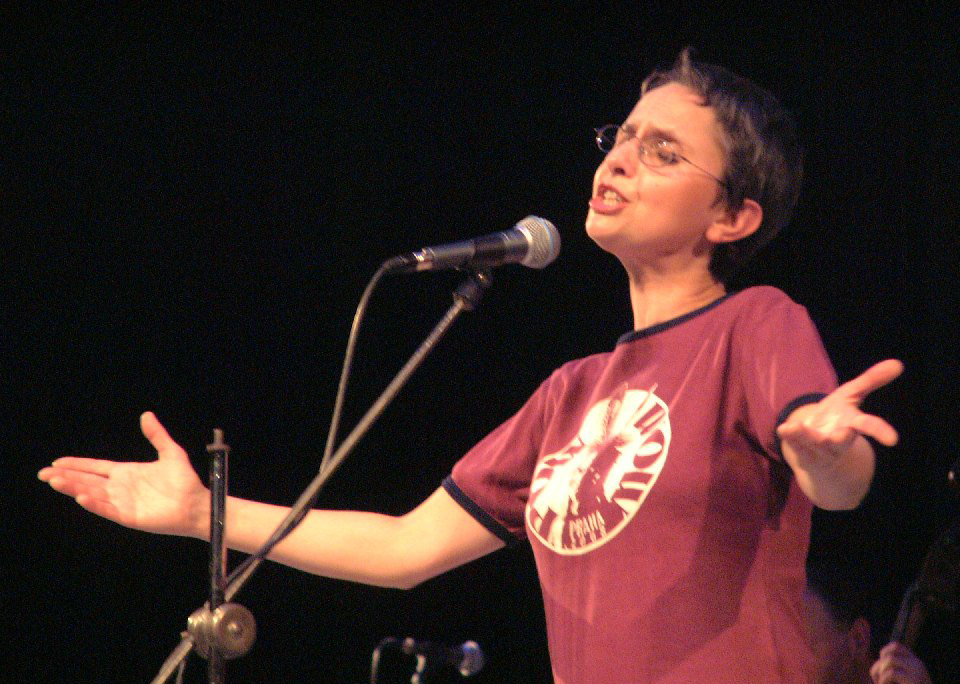
- Zuzana Navarová in 2003 in Vsetín.

Background information
- Born: 18 June 1959; Hradec Králové, Czechoslovakia
- Died: 7 December 2004 (aged 45) Prague
- Genres: Folk music World music
- Occupation: Singer

Zuzana Navarová de Tejada (18 June 1959 – 7 December 2004) was a Czech singer and songwriter. She began her career in the early 1980s as a member of Nerez, and gradually became one of the most significant personalities of the Czech folk and world music scene. Her style was partially inspired by Latin American music.

== Biography ==
Navarová studied Spanish and Czech language at the Faculty of Arts and Philosophy of the Charles University in Prague. A part of her studies Navarová spent in Havana, Cuba where she took music inspiration for her later career. Following her studies she began to work as a teacher. At the end of the 1980s, together with fellow musicians from Nerez, she studied also at the Prague Conservatory. Although she began her music career as a student, with the band Výlety, her breakthrough only came in early 1980s, when she joined Nerez. She met co-founding members of Nerez, Zdeněk Vřešťál and Vít Sázavský, during her studies in Prague. The performances with the band brought her first critical acclaim and popularity. In 1982, she won the best singer award at the festival Vokalíza in Prague.

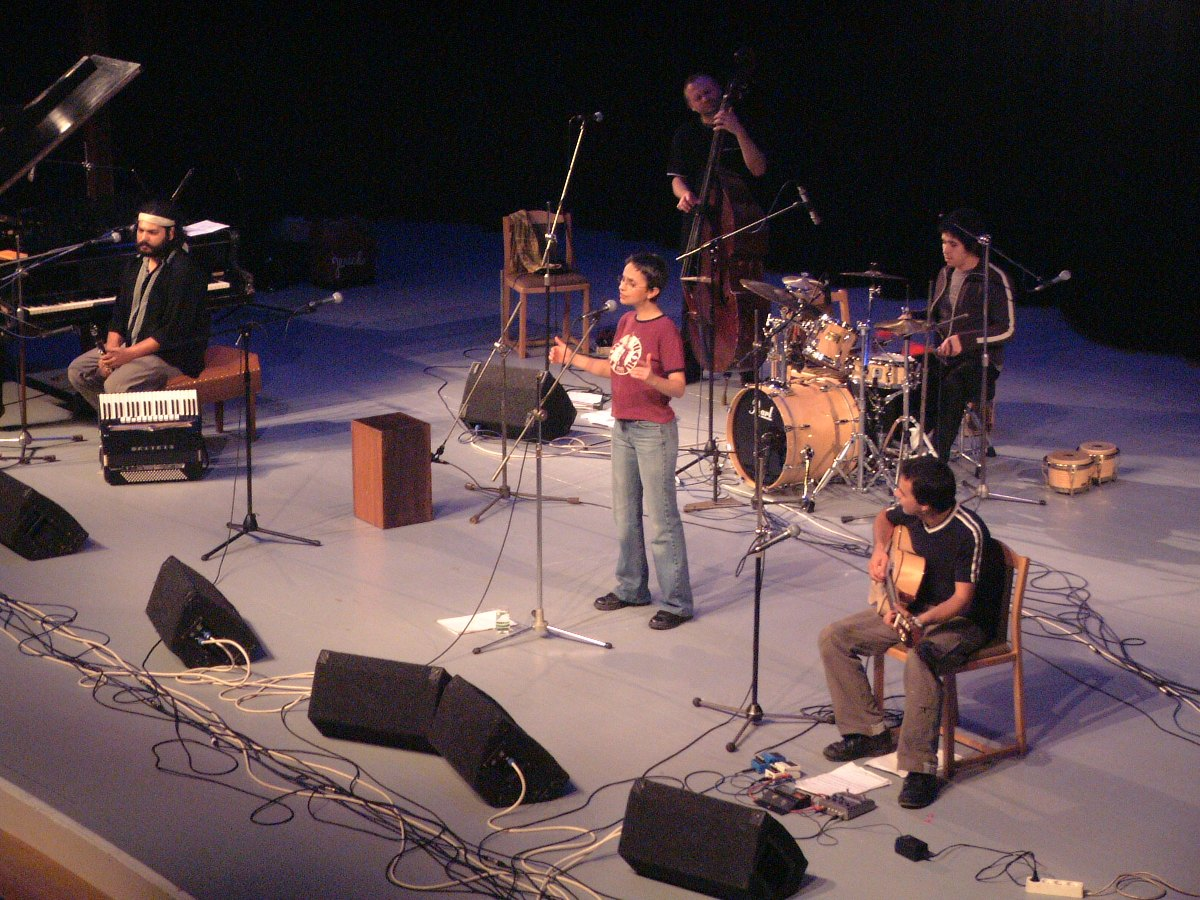
Navarová and Koa in Vsetín

In the 1990s, she began her brief solo career. Her only solo album Caribe she released with Caribe Jazz Quintet in 1992. It was sung in Spanish, in a Latin American musical style, using songs by Pablo Milanés and José Antonio Méndez. Shortly after that, she started a long-lasting collaboration with Colombian songwriter and guitarist Iván Gutiérrez. In 1991, the Czech Music Foundation awarded her as the best librettist of 1990. Nerez ended its activities in 1993, following the recording of the album Nerez v Betlémě. In 1994 she recorded another album with the band Tres, and since 1998 she began collaboration with the band Koa. In 2000, Gutiérrez moved to Madrid and Koa engaged a Romani musician Mário Bihári, with whom Navarová collaborated for the rest of her career.

She composed music for theatre plays and participated also in other musical activities. At the beginning of the 1990s she helped establishing the foundation Nadace Život umělce. As a producer, she collaborated with Věra Bílá and Kale) and helped at the beginning of the career of singer and accordionist Radůza.

In the early 2000s she became ill with cancer, but attempted to conceal her health condition from public and secretly underwent treatment. Navarová died of cancer in December 2004. She was 45. She performed at the stage with Koa even in the last days of her life; her last concert with the band took place in Prague, on 14 November 2004.

During her stay in Cuba, Navarová married Luís de Tejada, whose name she later adopted. However, in later years she severed contacts with her husband. Iván Gutiérrez later indicated that Navarová married for the purpose of helping de Tejada to emigrate from Cuba.

The lyrics by Navarová from 1998 to 2004 were published in 2009, under the title Andělská počta.

== Discography ==
=== Nerez ===
- Porta '83 (various artists, 1984)
- Dostavník 21: Tisíc dnů mezi námi / Za poledne (7-inch EP, 1984)
- Imaginární hospoda (7-inch EP; with Karel Plíhal a Slávek Janoušek) (1986)
- Masopust (1986)
- Na vařený nudli (1988)
- Ke zdi (1990)
- Co se nevešlo (Nerez a Vy) (1991)
- Stará láska Nerez a vy (1993)
- Nerez v Betlémě (1993)
- Nerez antologie (1995)
- Co se nevešlo (pozdní sběr) (2001)
- Nej nej nej (2001)
- Smutkům na kabát (2005)
- Do posledního dechu (2006)
- …a bastafidli! (2007)

=== Solo project Caribe ===
- Caribe (1992)

=== Tres ===
- Tres (1995)

=== Koa ===
- Skleněná vrba (1999)
- Zelené album (2000)
- Barvy všecky (2001)
- Jako Šántidéví (2003)
- Koa (2006)

=== Other ===
- Vánoční písně a koledy (Christmas Songs and Carols, 1992)
- Morytáty a balady (1993)
- Sloni v porcelánu I. (1999) – sampler
- Nebe počká (2004) – Zuzana Navarová sings five songs on the album by Karel Plíhal with lyrics by Josef Kainar
- Smutkům na kabát (2005) – compilation

In 2001, Navarová participated on the album Andělové z nebe by Radůza; Marie Rottrová included two songs by Navarová on her album Podívej (2001).

== Awards ==
- Award of the folk festival PORTA (1982).
- The best vocal performance at the Vokalíza in Prague (1982)
- The main award from the festival PORTA and Vokalíza (1982)
- The librettist of the Year (1990) – awarded by the Czech music Foundation (1991)
- Critics'nomination in the category female singers (Czech Grammy Awards) (1993)
- Žlutá ponorka (1999)
- Czech Academy of Music awarded her Anděl in the category folk music (2001)
- Inducted into Hall of Fame of the Czech Academy of Pop Music (2005)

== Literature ==
- Vřešťál, Zdeněk (2009). Ne, Nerez nerezne (in Czech). Prague: Galén. ISBN 978-80-7262-611-3.
- Navarová, Zuzana (2009). Svanovská, Hana (ed.). Andělská počta (in Czech). Brno: Host. ISBN 978-80-7294-267-1.
