= Karel Plíhal =

Czech musician (born 1958)

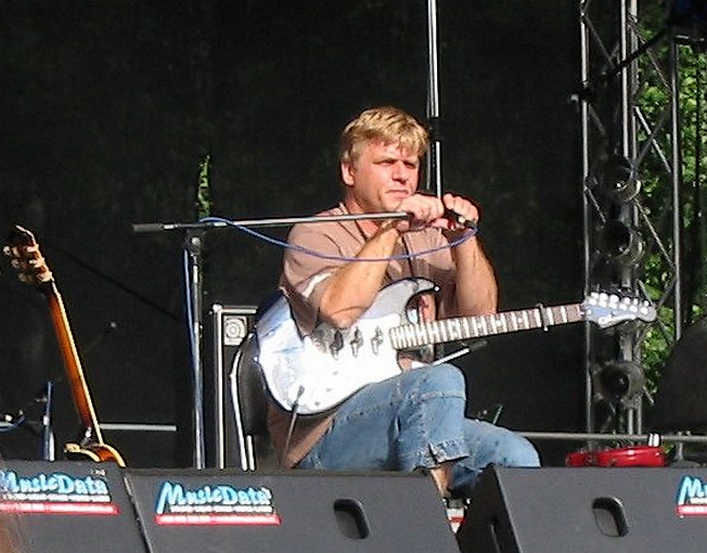
- Plíhal at Okoř Festival 2004

Background information
- Born: 23 April 1958 (age 68); Přerov, Czechoslovakia
- Genres: Jazz, folk
- Occupations: Jazz musician, lyricist, poet, record producer
- Instrument: Guitar
- Website: karelplihal.cz

Karel Plíhal (born 23 August 1958) is a Czech folk and jazz musician, singer, songwriter and record producer.

== Life ==
Plíhal was born on 23 August 1958 in Přerov. He graduated from the Industrial College of Engineering and then worked as a designer and boilerman in the Olomouc theatre, finally becoming a singer (even though he had no formal musical education). He has played the guitar since he was 15 years old. First, he played in various underground country-swing bands in Olomouc: Hučka, Falešní hráči and Plíharmonyje. He produced his first solo album in 1983. Between 1985 and 1993, Plíhal worked with Emil Pospíšil, and from 1995 to 1999 he produced music with Petr Freund. He has also won four Porta folk music awards as of 2006. His 2005 album Karel Plíhal in Olomouc was recorded in his home town in Moravia in a 2004 concert.

Plíhal has composed music for numerous productions at the Moravian Theatre in Olomouc, among others Zlatovláska, Sluha dvou pánů, Utrpení Dona Perlimplína, Manon Lescaut, Cyrano, Zimní pohádka, Pašije and Giroflé-Giroflá. He has set music to a few of Josef Kainar's poems, and he has directed recording for albums by artists such as Jarek Nohavica, Petr Fiala, Eben brothers and Bokomara band.

He starred as himself in Petr Zelenka's mockumentary Year of the Devil (Rok ďábla).

== Discography ==
- Karel Plíhal (1985)
- Karel Plíhal...Emil Pospíšil... (1989)
- Karel Plíhal 1985-89 (1992) – summary edition of the two previous albums with added song Žlutí sokoli
- Takhle nějak to bylo... (1994)
- Králíci, ptáci a hvězdy (1996)
- Napadl Sníh (Sova Sněžná) (2000) – a single released as a Christmas CD of Česká spořitelna
- Kluziště (2000) – album with new arrangements of old songs
- Rok ďábla (2002) – music for the movie of the same name
- Nebe počká (2004) – poems of Josef Kainar, in collaboration with Zuzana Navarová
- Karel Plíhal v Telči (2005) – DVD recording of a concert in Telč
- Karel Plíhal v Olomouci (2005) – two CD recording of a concert in Olomouc
- Vzduchoprázdniny (2012)
- Plíharmonyje – concert bootleg
- Mávej, mávej – concert bootleg
