= Martin Velíšek =

Czech artist and musician (born 1963)

Martin Velíšek (born 21 October 1963 in Duchcov, Czechoslovakia) is a Czech artist whose work spans the media of glass and canvas, animated film, album covers, book covers, restaurant menus, napkin packaging, TV packaging, photography, sculpture, and interiors.

Academically, Velíšek's work is commonly referred as grotesque, gothic, or absurdist. Velíšek himself avows a self-conceived school of "Parealism", and indeed the peculiarity of his artistic style eludes easy definition.

== Life and work ==
Martin Velíšek graduated from the School of Industrial Art in Kamenický Šenov in 1983 and then from the glass-working department of the College of Industrial Art, Prague in 1989. While his exhibitions drew attention even in communist-era Czechoslovakia, it was his association with the popular avant-punk band Už Jsme Doma (where he holds the honorary title of “court painter“ and since 1994 he is regular member of band) in the 1990s that brought him broad public acclaim. Other wide-ranging projects in that decade contributed to making his work widely recognisable, such as: award-winning book cover for the Czech classic Babička (The Grandmother) by Božena Němcová, his contribution to Aurel Klimt‘s animated film version of Jan Werich’s Fimfárum, and his embellishment of Prague-Žižkov’s famed tavern “At the Shot Out Eye” (U vystřelenýho oka), where his conceptions adorn everything from the tables to the head-rests he invented for the urinals.

== Interpretation ==
A dominant theme in Velíšek's work is man, or better put, the body of man, generally closed in a space in his nakedness or before a horizon, and treated with a specific kind of crooked, or comical, baseness, that creates a distinctly black sense of humour. The pictures always have a clear composition which, along with abundant use of writing, leads to a sort of Gothicism applied with equal measure to religion or pub scenes.

In 1992, however, his very human heroes provoked scandal: members of the local Catholic Church demanded that certain canvases on exhibition in the town of Znojmo be taken down or covered up. This new precedent in the post-communist world of Czech art, and the publicity that accompanied it, became a main factor in Matin Velíšek's speedy and unsought-after celebrity.

Velíšek has since been the subject of two documentary films for Czech Television, Spring, Hell, Autumn, Winter (Jaro, peklo, podzim, zima, 1994) and The Civilian Parealist's Studio (Ateliér civilistního parealisty, 1996). He lives in Prague.

== Books ==
Books by/about:

- Lyžaři, Argo, 1996
- Už jsme doma 11+4, Argo, 2000 (pop-up book)

Selected book covers:

- A uzřela oslice anděla, by Nick Cave, Argo, 1995
- Farma zvířat, Argo, 2000
- Babička (The Grandmother), by Božena Němcová, Prostor, 2006
