= Indies Records =

Czech independent record label

Indies Records is a record label based in Brno, Czech Republic. The label was founded in 1990 by Milan Páleš and Miloš Gruber and has since released over 200 titles, working under the label motto "We only release music that we like". Starting out releasing different types of alternative music, the label has gradually shifted its focus to become more folk-oriented. The largest Czech folk music festival, Zahrada, has also had a stage dedicated to the label.

Some of the more well-known artists with releases on Indies are Iva Bittová, Hradišťan, Zuzana Navarová, Radůza, Jablkoň, Traband, Jiří Dědeček, Jan Burian and Sestry Steinovy. The label has also released numerous albums by debuting artists, usually winners from various competitions or festivals (Koňaboj, Žofie Kabelková, Martina Trchová, Žamboši, Hromosvod, Disneyband), and put together compilations from old vinyl records (Dagmar Andrtová-Voňková, Čp.8). They also published the book Encylopedie československého rocku (Encyclopedia of Czechoslovak rock) by authors Miroslav Balák and Josef Kytnar.

In 2007, Indies split into three independent sub-labels. However, distribution has remained shared.

- Indies Scope Records
- Indies MG Records
- Indies Happy Trails
