= Miroslav Wanek =

Czech musician and poet (born 1962)

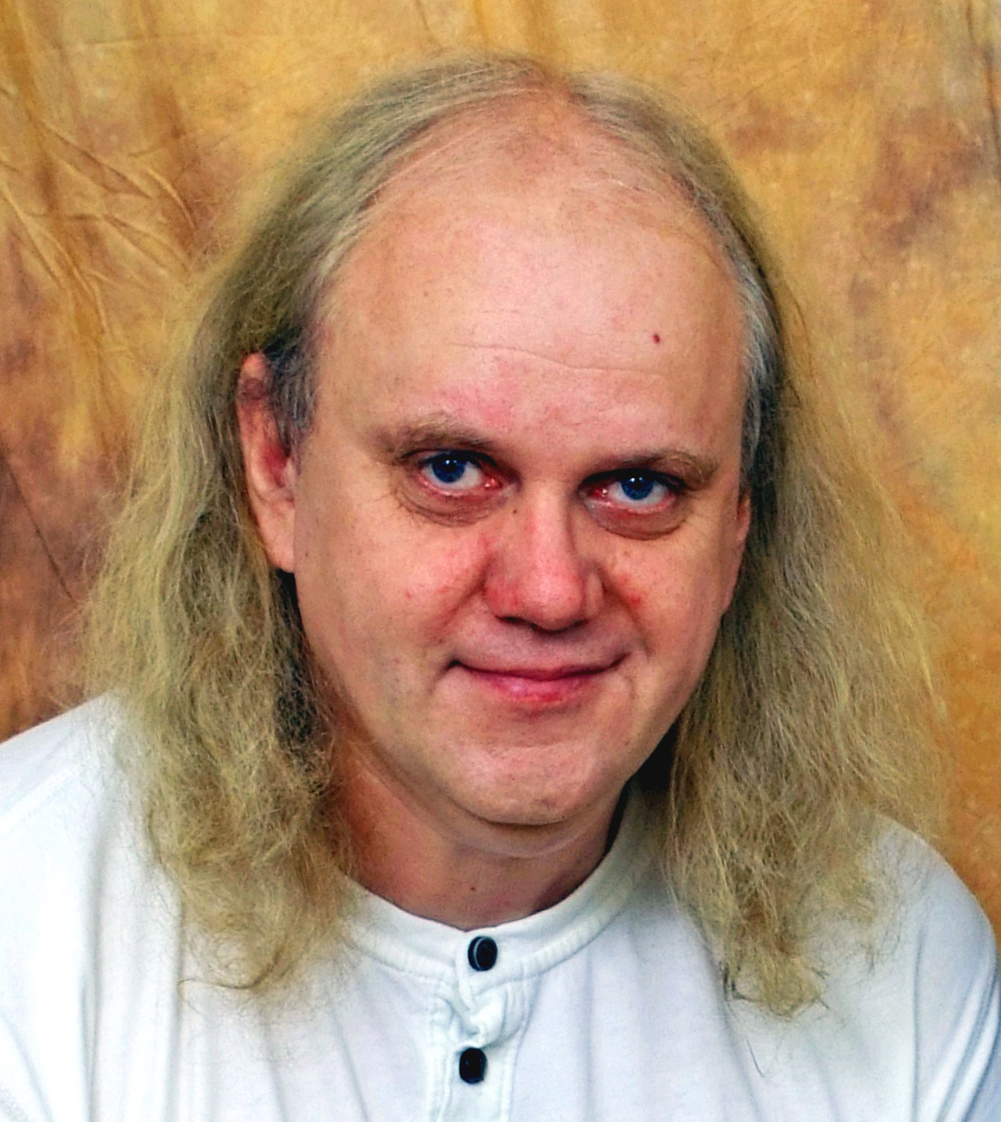
- Wanek in 2011

Background information
- Born: 7 April 1962 (age 64); Teplice, Czechoslovakia
- Genres: Avant-garde; punk rock; rock
- Occupations: Musician; composer; poet
- Instruments: Guitar; keyboard; bass; vocals
- Years active: 1981–present
- Labels: Skoda Records; Poseidon Records; Indies; Cuneiform
- Member of: FPB, Už Jsme Doma
- Website: uzjsmedoma.com

Miroslav Wanek ([ˈmɪroslav ˈvanɛk], born 7 April 1962) is a Czech musician, poet, and lyricist. He is the frontman for the avant-garde punk rock group Už jsme doma, in which he has served as lead vocalist since 1986, bassist from 1986 to 1988, guitarist and keyboardist since 1988, major composer and co-composer from 1986 to 2001, and sole composer since 2001. Prior to Už jsme doma, he played bass and sang in the punk group FPB (Fourth Price Band), from 1980 to 1985. His musical background includes two years of classical piano training and conservatory. Wanek's lyrics have earned him a reputation as a respected Czech poet.

== Career ==
=== FPB and Už jsme doma ===
In 1980, Wanek helped found the punk rock group FPB (Fourth Price Band). He played with them until 1986, at which point he was invited to join Už jsme doma, another punk band, formed by FPB drummer Milan Nový. To date, the group has released eleven studio albums, all of them with Wanek on lead vocals. They have toured internationally and collaborated with various punk and avant-garde artists.

In 1990, Wanek reformed FPB, which had split up in 1987, and they released the album Kdo z koho, ten toho, their third. After another hiatus, the band reunited in 2008 and issued the triple album Kniha prani a stiznosti. They remain intermittently active.

=== Other work ===
Wanek has produced music for various bands, including Dybbuk, Zuby Nehty, Ženy, Činna, and his own FPB and Už jsme doma. He has also scored a number of Czech films, including Fimfárum, for which he received a Czech Lion nomination. Between 2008 and 2009, he composed music for the children's television series Krysáci, produced by Czech Television.

He has published two books: Eyeball to Eyeball, about the American avant-garde group the Residents, which he co-authored with Karel Císař, and 11, a pop-up book illustrated by Martin Velíšek, intended to be a companion piece to the music of Už jsme doma. He also released a book with all his lyrics and archive photos, titled Vylov suplika, in 2012.

In addition, Wanek has taught music theory and dramaturgy of film scores at FAMU, in Prague.
