= Freak Show/Freak Show Soundtrack =

Freak Show

Soundtrack album by the Residents
- Released: 1990
- Recorded: 1989
- Length: 52:53 (Special Edition)
- Labels: The Voyager Company (CD-ROM); Mute/EMI

The Residents chronology
The King & Eye (1989)	Freak Show (1990)	Our Finest Flowers (1992)

Freak Show is a studio album by American art rock band the Residents, released in 1990. It marked the beginning of the Residents' obsession with emerging computer technology in the 1990s, and much of the music was made with various MIDI devices.

The interactive Freak Show CD-ROM was released in 1994. A Freak Show stage performance by a theater company at the Archa Theater in Prague premiered on November 1, 1995. Kyle Baker worked on a graphic novel, The Residents: Freak Show, which was released in 1992 by Dark Horse.

Several of the songs were also performed live during the 1997 25th anniversary concerts at the Fillmore in San Francisco. After the CD-ROM's success, the album was re-released as The Freak Show Soundtrack with a different cover. A limited edition, The Freak Show Special Edition, was released in 2002 to mark the band's 30th anniversary.

== Critical reception ==
Professional ratings
Review scores
Source	Rating
AllMusic	3/5 stars
The Encyclopedia of Popular Music	3/5 stars
MusicHound Rock: The Essential Album Guide	2.5/5 stars
Spin Alternative Record Guide	4/10

Trouser Press called the album "relatively accessible" as well as "often unnerving," writing that "there are more than enough lyrical twists and turns to avoid mere gross-out overkill, and the music shifts textures and tempos ... to follow suit."

== Track listing ==
=== Original album ===
1. "Everyone Comes to the Freak Show"
2. "Harry the Head"
3. "Herman the Human Mole"
4. "Wanda the Worm Woman"
5. "Jelly Jack the Boneless Boy"
6. "Benny the Bouncing Bump"
7. "Mickey the Mumbling Midget"
8. "Lillie"
9. "Nobody Laughs When They Leave"

=== Special edition ===
Disc 1

1. "Everyone Comes to the Freak Show"
2. "Harry's Introduction"
3. "Harry, the Head"
4. "Herman Watches TV (Mexican Porn)"
5. "Herman, the Human Mole"
6. "Wanda Does Her Act"
7. "Wanda, the Worm Woman"
8. "Jack Amuses the Crowd"
9. "Jack, the Boneless Boy"
10. "Benny Bounces"
11. "Benny, the Bouncing Bump"
12. "Mickey, the Mumbling Midget"
13. "Lillie"
14. "Nobody Laughs When They Leave"
- Disc 1 was eventually re-released in late 2007.

Disc 2 aka Freak Show Live (Prague 1995)

1. "Everyone Comes to the Freak Show"
2. "Wanda"
3. "Mickey"
4. "Bridge"
5. "Herman"
6. "Harry"
7. "Jack"
8. "Benny"
9. "Wanda's Letters (Part 17)"
10. "Nobody Laughs When They Leave"
11. "Freak Show Remix (2001)"
12. "Benny Live-Icky Flix Tour (2001)"
