= Panton Records =

Former Czech record label

Panton Records or PANTON was a Czechoslovak and later Czech record label and music publishing house of the Czech Music Fund, founded in 1968. In Czechoslovakia, it was one of the three major state-owned labels, the other two being Supraphon and Opus.

Panton specialized primarily in publishing contemporary classical sheet music. The company was active until the mid-1990s, after which its musical catalogue moved to Supraphon.
