= Tamizdat =

Tamizdat may refer to:

- Tamizdat, literature of the Soviet Union published abroad (see Samizdat)
- Tamizdat Incorporated, an American cultural exchange organization
