= Tamizdat Incorporated =

- Formation: 1998; 28 years ago
- Founder: "Skulpey"
- Type: Nonprofit organization
- Legal status: Tax-exempt 501(c)(3)
- Purpose: Facilitating international cultural exchange
- Headquarters: Brooklyn, New York
- Website: Official website

Tamizdat Incorporated is a tax-exempt 501(c)(3) nonprofit organization with the mission of facilitating international cultural exchange. It was founded in 1998 by a group of musicians and is currently based in Brooklyn, New York.

== History ==
Founded in 1998 by the members of the musical group, "Skulpey", Tamizdat has been involved with a wide range of activities aimed at encouraging the international dissemination of culture. Initially, Tamizdat was primarily engaged in helping independent musicians from Central and Eastern Europe reach broader audiences. Tamizdat organized showcases at music festivals including the South By Southwest festival and the College Music Journal Marathon. It organized tours, including tours for the Czech ensembles The Plastic People of the Universe and Metamorphosis.

Between 2000 and 2005, Tamizdat ran a music shop and CD distribution coalition based in Prague, Czech Republic. In 2000, Tamizdat's board recognized that the U.S. visa system posed a significant impediment to presenters of foreign culture in the U.S. and launched Tamizdat Visa Services to provide non-legal assistance to the international arts community. In 2009, Tamizdat Artist Services LLC was launched to streamline operations and allow the organization to serve the needs of an increasingly broad client base.
