= List of Czech musical groups =

This list contains an incomplete enumeration of Czech bands, not including classical ensembles.

== 0–9 ==
- 5Angels

== A ==
- Abraxas
- Alia Tempora
- Arakain
- Ars Rediviva
- Asonance
- Autopsia

== B ==
- Banjo Band
- Blue Effect
- Bluesquare
- Boni Pueri, the Czech Boys Choir
- Brontosauři
- Brutus
- Buty

== C ==
- Carnal Diafragma
- Cartonnage
- Čechomor
- Chaozz
- Charlie Straight
- Chinaski
- Citron
- Clarinet Factory
- Clou

== D ==
- The Desperate Mind
- DG 307
- Diamond Cats
- Divokej Bill
- Doctor Victor
- Druhá Tráva
- Dunaj
- DVA
- Dymytry

== E ==
- E
- The Ecstasy of Saint Theresa
- E!E
- Energit
- Etc

== F ==
- Flamengo
- Forgotten Silence
- FPB
- Framus Five

== G ==
- Garage
- George & Beatovens
- Gipsy.cz

== H ==
- Hudba Praha
- Hypnos

== I ==
- Insania

== J ==
- J.A.R.
- Jasná Páka
- Jazz Q
- Jelen

== K ==
- Kabát
- Krabathor
- Kreyson
- Krucipüsk
- Kryštof

== L ==
- Lake Malawi
- Laura a její tygři
- Lucie

== M ==
- Malignant Tumour
- Mandrage
- Master (American-Czech since the mid-2000s)
- Master's Hammer
- The Matadors
- Maxim Turbulenc
- Midi lidi
- Mirai
- Mňága a Žďorp
- Monkey Business

== N ==
- Naše Věc

== O ==
- Oceán
- Olympic
- Ondřej Havelka a jeho Melody Makers
- Original Prague Syncopated Orchestra
- Ortel

== P ==
- Patrola Šlapeto
- Pipes and Pints
- The Plastic People of the Universe
- Poutníci
- Prago Union
- Pražský výběr
- Priessnitz
- Progres 2
- The Prostitutes
- Psí vojáci
- Public Relations
- Půlnoc
- Pusa

== R ==
- Rangers – Plavci
- Root

== S ==
- The Sads
- Salamandra
- Sebastien
- Shalom
- Silent Stream of Godless Elegy
- Škwor
- Slza
- Spirituál kvintet
- Sto zvířat
- Support Lesbiens

== T ==
- Tata Bojs
- Tichá dohoda
- Törr
- The Tower of Dudes
- Toxique
- Trollech
- Tři sestry
- Turbo

== U ==
- Umbrtka
- Už jsme doma

== V ==
- Verona
- Visací zámek
- Vitacit

== W ==
- Wanastowi Vjecy
- We Are Domi
- Wohnout

== X ==
- XIII. Století

== Y ==
- Yellow Sisters
- Yo Yo Band

== Z ==
- Žentour
- Žlutý pes
- Zrní
- Zuby Nehty

== See also ==
- List of Czech musicians
