= Sázavafest =

Multicultural festival in Czech Republic

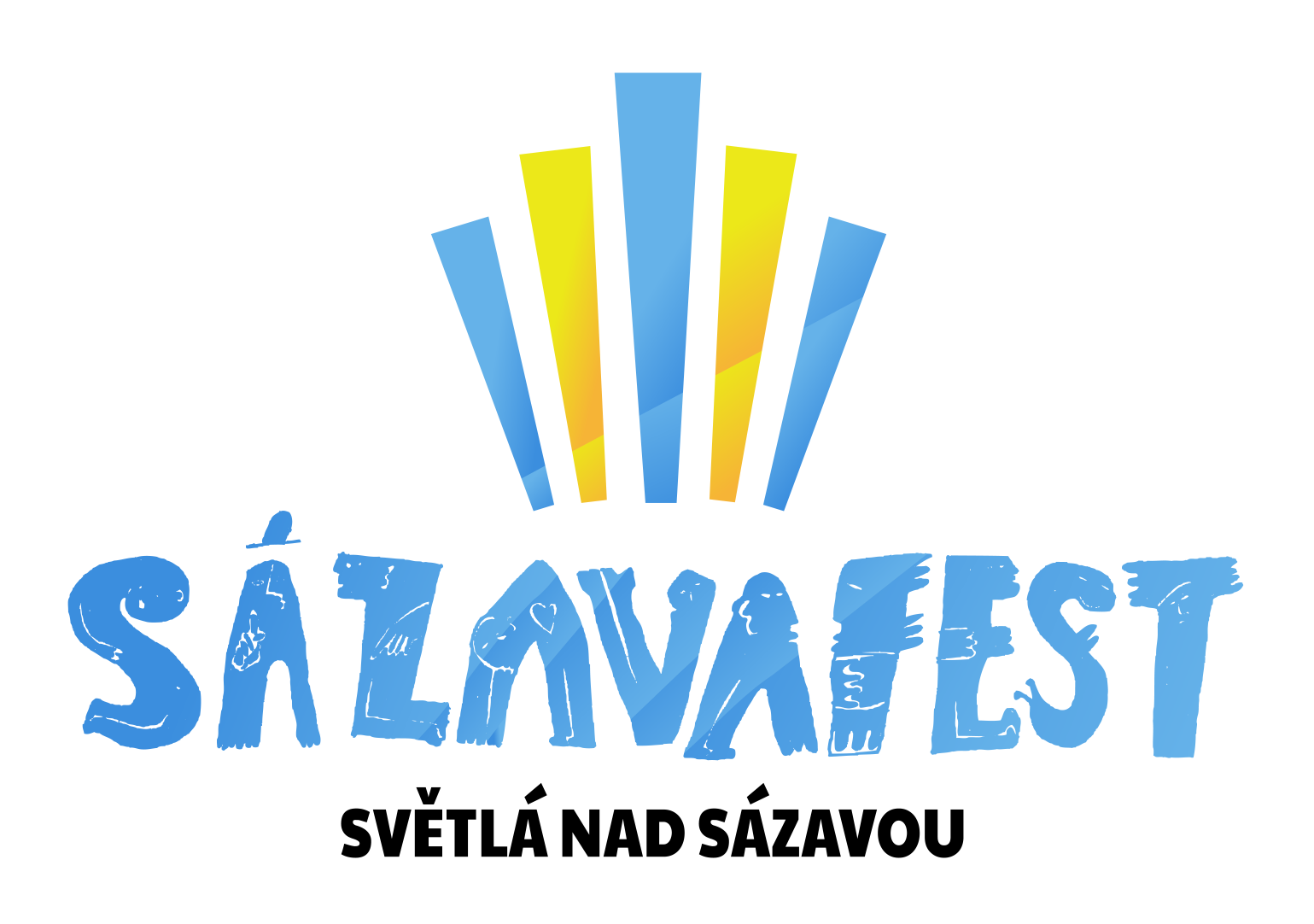
- New festival logo since 2016
- Genre: Rock, pop rock, electronic, hip hop
- Dates: End of July or beginning of August; 3 days
- Locations: Czech Republic: Týnec nad Sázavou (2001); Sázava (2002–2006); Kácov (2007–2010); Benešov (2011–2012); Světlá nad Sázavou (2013–present)
- Years active: 2001–present
- Founders: In promotion, s.r.o.
- Website: Official website

Sázavafest is a multicultural, mostly music festival held in the Czech Republic each year around the river Sázava. The first year of the festival was held in 2001 on a single platform. Over time, the event has grown and at the sixth year was performed on seven stages with a large number of well-known Czech interpreters and many foreign guests. In addition to the musical performances there are held readings, e.g. Michal Viewegh or Mardoša. In 2015 became company XANADU-Catering major investor and the festival has expanded the number of performing bands. In previous years the festival consisted of bands including: Alphaville, Kosheen, Sinplus, Support Lesbiens, Ewa Farna, Wohnout, Rytmus, Voxel, UDG or Škwor.

== External links and references ==
- Official website in English
- Official Facebook in English
- Official YouTube site
