= Modrá je dobrá =

1998 song by Žlutý pes

Single by Žlutý pes

from the album Poslední lžíce
- Released: 1998
- Recorded: 1998
- Genre: Rock
- Length: 2:52
- Songwriter: Ondřej Hejma

Modrá je dobrá (in English Blue is Good) is a song by the Czech rock band Žlutý pes, from their 1998 album, Poslední lžíce. The song was released during the 1998 legislative election and was frequently used during the campaign of the Civic Democratic Party (ODS). It became the party's anthem. A video for the song was released the same year. The song was composed by Ondřej Hejma.

"Modrá je dobrá" was later re-released in 2001 on the album Čínská otázka (Chinese Question). This version was recorded in Chinese.

== Political use of the song ==
"Modrá je dobrá" was inspired by the Donovan song "Colours". Hejma didn't intend it to be a political song even though he was upset about the Sarajevo assassination; he did predict it would become the anthem of the Civic Democratic Party. The song became popular after its release and some prominent members of the Civic Democratic Party asked Hejma if they could use it during their campaign. Hejma himself supported the Civic Democratic Party at the time.

In 2017, Žlutý pes performed at the meeting of the Realists. "Modrá je dobrá" was one of the songs they performed.

== Text ==
Czech version:

Modrá je planeta, kde můžeme žít

Modrá je voda, kterou musíme pít

Modrá je obloha, když vodejde mrak

Modrá je dobrá, už je to tak.

Modrá je Milka – ta naše kráva

Modrá je prej v Americe tráva

Modrá je údajně i polární liška

Senzačně modrá je moje vojenská knížka.

Jako nálada když zahrajou poslední kus

Modrá je naděje láska i moje blues

Je to barva, kterou mám prostě rád

Modrá je dobrá, už je to tak.

Modrá je Raketa – ta moje holka

modrá je vzpomínka na Mikiho Volka

velká rána je modrej přeliv modrý voko má i černej šerif

Jako nálada když zahrajou poslední kus

Modrá je naděje láska i moje blues

je to barva kterou mám prostě rád

modrá je dobrá – už je to tak

Jako nálada když zahrajou poslední kus

Modrá je naděje láska i moje blues

je to barva kterou mám prostě rád

modrá je dobrá – už je to tak

English translation:

Blue is the planet where we can live

Blue is the water we have to drink

Blue is the sky when the cloud leaves

Blue is good and that's just how it is

Blue is Milka – the cow of ours

Blue is the grass in America, apparently

Blue is also supposedly polar fox

Sensantinally blue is my military book

Like the mood when they play the last piece

Blue is hope, love and my blues

It's the colour I just like

Blue is good and that's just how it is

Blue is Rocket – the girl of mine

Blue is the memory of Miki Volek

Big blow is the blue spillway

Blue eye has even black sheriff

Like the mood when they play the last piece

Blue is hope, love and my blues

It's the colour I just like

Blue is good and that's just how it is

Like the mood when they play the last piece

Blue is hope, love and my blues

It's the colour I just like

Blue is good and that's just how it is
