= Clou =

Czech rock band

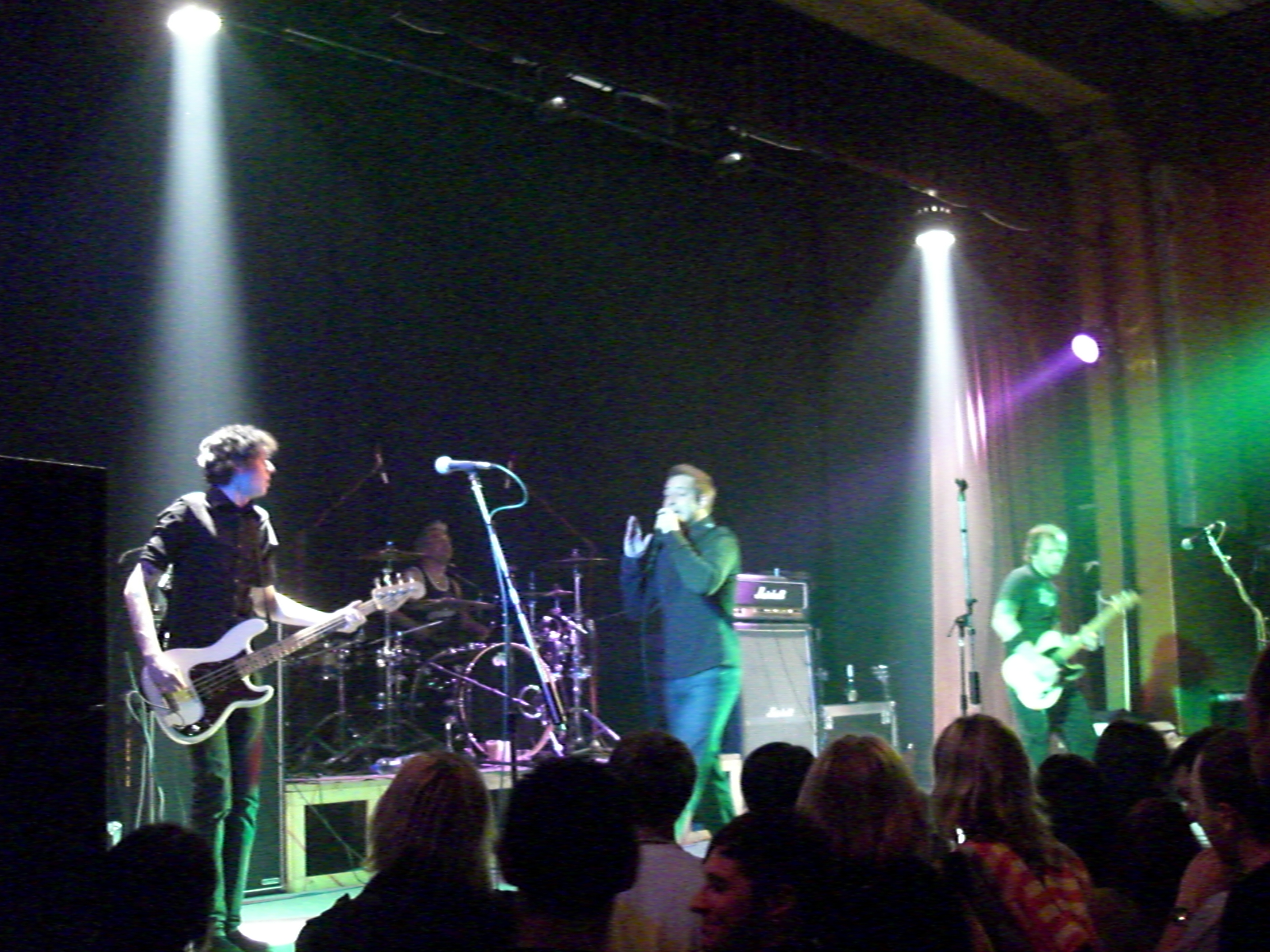
- Clou in 2007

Background information
- Origin: Prague, Czech Republic
- Genres: Hardcore punk (early); emo (early); alternative rock; pop punk
- Years active: 2001–2014
- Labels: Sony BMG
- Past members: Lukáš Vyhnal; Petr Vaško; Radek Tomášek; Hubert Topinka; Brian B.; Pavel Bureš; Štěpán Farkaš

Clou was a Czech rock band from Prague formed in 2001, who sang in English. They released their debut EP, First, in 2004, and a studio album titled Postcards in 2005. They went on to release three more albums before breaking up in 2014.

== History ==
=== Beginnings: 2001–05 ===
Clou, initially composed of Lukáš Vyhnal (vocals), Radek Tomášek Jr. (drums), Petr Vaško (guitar), Hubert Topinka (guitar), and Brian Yamato (bass), formed in 2001 and began playing hardcore punk, emo, and mainstream punk rock. They played at various club concerts, skateboarding events, and have appeared at the Rock for People festival several times since 2004.

In 2004, they released the three-track EP First. At the turn of 2004–05, Clou went into the studio to record their debut full-length album, Postcards.

=== Peak of success: 2005–06 ===
On 21 March 2005, Clou released the album Postcards, which proved to be a great success, especially on the Czech music scene. It included elements of melodic hardcore, punk rock, and pop punk. Thanks to good production, the single "Island Sun" went not only to the top of the Czech charts, but was also played on MTV, where it reached the Top 10 music videos. The album included contributions from Slovak singer Dara Rolins and Kryštof Michal, then-vocalist of Support Lesbiens. Postcards won two Anděl Awards in 2006. Clou's popularity grew rapidly, and they became one of the most sought-after Czech bands, as evidenced by the countless club concerts and open-air festivals they played.

A critical moment in the band's history came in the summer of 2006, when in the middle of a festival tour, bassist Brian B. decided to leave the band. Clou then played several acoustic performances and considered whether to continue or quit. They eventually added bassist Štěpán Farkaš (Měhrot, Jaksi taksi) to their lineup.

At the end of the summer of 2006, Clou was given the opportunity to compose and record several songs for the film Prachy dělaj člověka. Towards the end of the year, the band reentered the studio to record their second album.

=== Clou, For Tonight, Old Dogs New Tricks; breakup: 2007–14 ===
Clou's sophomore, self-titled album, was released in 2007. American musician Austin Lucas, who lives in the Czech Republic, helped write the album's lyrics. The band conducted a tour titled Ghosts of November to promote the record, on which they were joined by the bands Selfish, The Prostitutes, and 5 April.

In July 2008, Clou added guitarist Pavel (Rocky) Bureš of 5 April to their roster, and began recording their next album. For Tonight was released in 2008.

In 2012, Clou released their final album, Old Dogs New Tricks, and broke up two years later.

== Band members ==
- Lukáš "Lukemo" Vyhnal – vocals
- Petr "Petrock" Vaško – guitar
- Radek "Rae" Tomášek Jr. – drums
- Hubert "Hube" Topinka – guitar
- Brian B. (Bugsy) – bass
- Pavel "Rocky" Bureš – guitar
- Štěpán "Steph" Farkaš – bass

== Discography ==
Studio albums

- Postcards (2005)
- Clou (2007)
- For Tonight (2008)
- Old Dogs New Tricks (2012)

EPs

- First (2004)

Soundtracks

- Prachy dělaj člověka OST (2006)
