= Zprdeleklika =

Studio album by Chaozz
- Released: 6 October 1997
- Recorded: 1997
- Genre: Rap
- Length: 57:46
- Language: Czech
- Label: Polygram/Universal
- Producer: Flavamatic, Sewer Klika, Bass, Deph

Chaozz chronology
...a nastal chaos (1996)	Zprdeleklika (1997)	P.E.S. (1999)

Zprdeleklika (literally meaning "Luck from the arse", in more free translation "Big fucking luck") is the second album by Czech hip hop group Chaozz, released on 6 October 1997. It was certified gold in both Slovakia and the Czech Republic. Music videos were made for "Chaozz veci", "Hej lidi" and "Zprdeleklika", as well as for non-album single "Sorry" with Slovak punk band No Gravity, which is the bonus track to the 1998 reissue of this album. The album was also released on vinyl in early October 1997, under the title Zprdelevinyl.

== Track listing ==
#	Title	Performer(s)	Samples	Producers(s)
1	"Fstup" Entrance	Intro – Fugaz, live show fragments & samples from previous songs		Bass
2	"Čím dál tím stejně (Odkud sem)" The more the same (Where I am from)	Verse 1 – Fugaz; Verse 2 – Bass; Verse 3 – Deph	Self-sample of "R.O.Z.D.Í.L."	Bass
3	"Chaozz věci" Chaozz stuff	Verses – Bass, Deph; Chorus – entire group	Samples of "Groove Me" by King Floyd and "You Can Make It if You Try" by Sly and the Family Stone	Deph, Bass
4	"Hej lidi" Hey, people	Chorus – entire group; Verse 1 – Deph; Verse 2 – Rusty; Verse 3 – Fugaz; Verse 4 – Bass	Samples of "Upside Down" by Diana Ross, "Flavor Flav" by Public Enemy and self-sample of "1,2,3" and "Televize"	Deph
5	"Z klece do hrobu" From the cage to the grave	Verses and Chorus – Deph, Fugaz, Rusty	Sample of "My Secret Fantasy" by The Controllers	Deph
6	"Zpomal!"; Slow down!	Verse 1 – Deph; Verse 2 – Rusty, Fugaz; Verse 3 – Bass	Sample of drums from "Sing a Simple Song" by Sly and the Family Stone	Deph, Bass
7	"7 čili 7 tahů (interlude)" 7 aka 7 moves	Improvisation		–
8	"Z prdele klika" Handle out of the arse	Verses – Deph, Chorus – Deph & Rusty	Samples of "Get Out of My Life, Woman" by Lee Dorsey, "Chinaman Blues" by Originální Pražský Synkopický Orchestr and "I'm still #1" by Boogie Down Productions	Deph, Fugaz
9	"Zelený peklo" Green hell	Verse 1 – Fugaz; Verse 2 – Rusty; Verse 3 – Bass		Bass
10	"Sobotage aneb óóó růžičko voňavááá" Sobotage, or 'Ó růžičko voňavá' (traditional folklore Czech song)	Luděk Sobota	Lyrics are samples of "Ze Soboty na Šimka 2" by Miloslav Šimek and Luděk Sobota	Bass, Fugaz, Rusty
11	"Všude dobře" [It is] good everywhere	Verse 1 – Deph; Verse 2 – Fugaz, Rusty; Verse 3 – Bass	Samples of "4 O'Clock in the Morning" by The Hassles and "Spinning Wheel" by Dr. Lonnie Smith	Deph
12	"Sny a realita" Dreams and reality	Verse 1 – Rusty; Chorus – Deph; Verse 2 – Fugaz; Verse 3 – Deph	Samples of "Sexual Healing" by Marvin Gaye, "What You Need" by Main Source and "Hydra" by Grover Washington Jr.	Deph, Fugaz
13	"9 minut poezie" 9 minutes of poetry	Freestyle; Verse 1 – Afro; Verse 2 – Kosa; Verse 3 – Mike-T; Verse 4 – Hafi; Verse 5 – Patrick aka Cak-P; Verse 6 – Bizzy B.; Verse 7 – Marimba; Verse 8 – Rusty; Verse 9 – Fugaz; Verse 10 – Bass; Verse 11 – Deph	Samples of "Hard to Handle" by Otis Redding, "Rychlík Jede do Prahy" by Ivan Mládek's Banjo Band and Luděk Sobota, "Sing a Simple Song" by Sly and the Family Stone, "Jakýpak Vokolky, Jdeme Balit Holky" by J.A.R. and Michael Viktořík, "AJ Scratch" by Kurtis Blow, and "It's a New Day" by Skull Snaps	Bass, Deph
14	"Výstub"; Outpud	Fugaz	Sample of Vinnetou Melodie by Martin Bötcher	Fugaz
15	"Brána (bonus)" Gate (bonus)	Verse 1 – Deph; Refrain sampled from Bob Dylan's text; Verse 2 – Rusty; Verse 3 – Fugaz	Sample of "Knockin' on Heaven's Door" by Bob Dylan	Deph, Fugaz

== Zprdelevinyl ==
In 1997, the band released a 12" vinyl including most of the tracks from the album, including a bonus track called "41200 - Homicide". The track is considered to be the first diss track released in the Czech Republic, targeting music critic Rodriguez (real name Luděk Staněk), who wrote a negative review of the band's previous album ...a nastal chaos in the music magazine Rock Pop.
