= Yo Yo Band =

Czech musical band

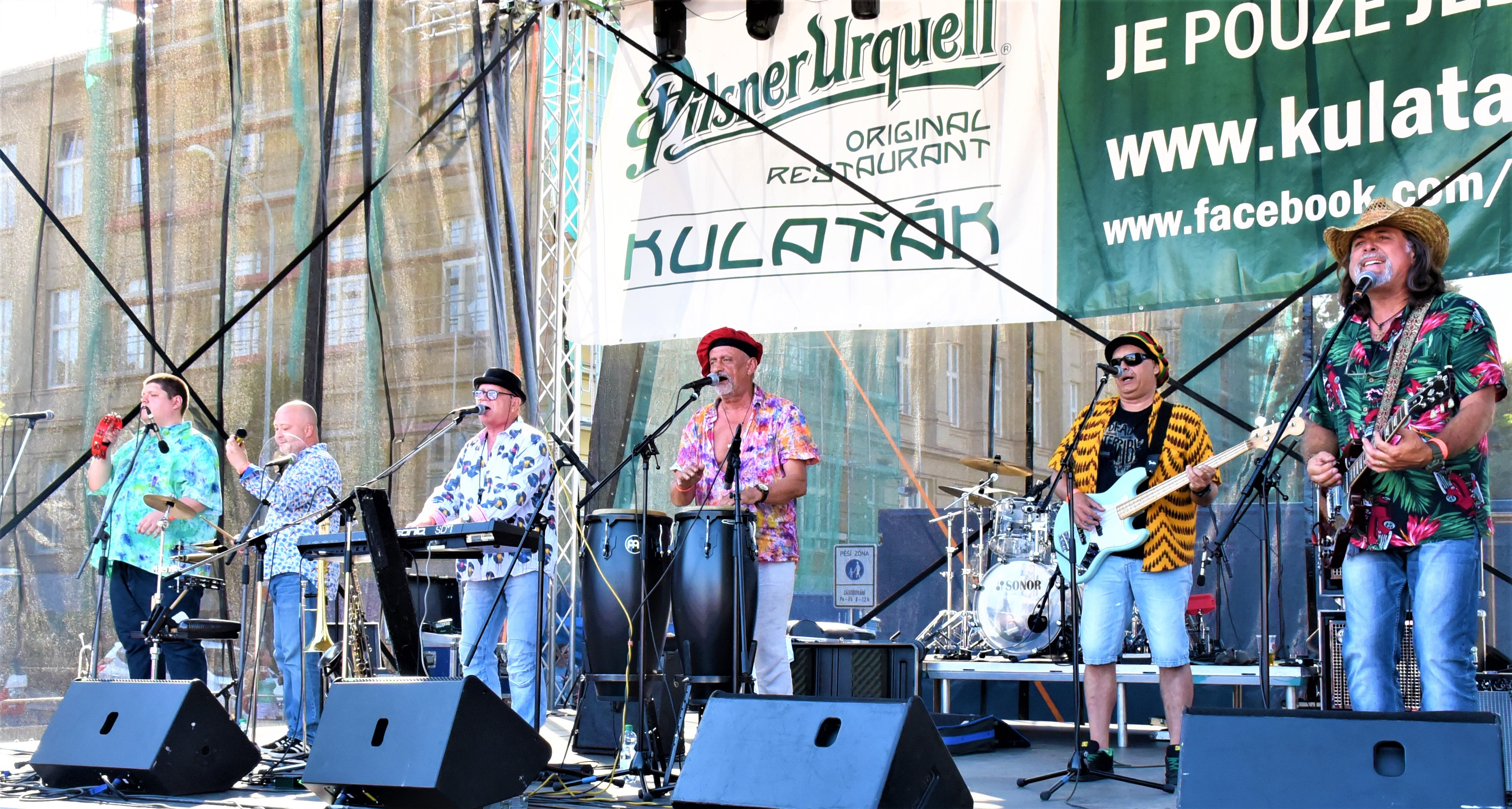
- Yo Yo Band performing in 2019

Background information
- Origin: Prague, Czechoslovakia
- Genres: Reggae; jazz; Latin; calypso; pop
- Years active: 1975–present
- Members: Miroslav Linhart; Jiří Šíma; Pavel Razím; Jan Šatra; Václav Venor Novotný; Roman Němec; Lukáš Pelikán; Filip Jiskra
- Past members: Vladimír Tesařík; Richard Tesařík; Ondřej Hejma; Julius Novotný-Kuzma; Jindřich Malík; Luděk Walter; Roman Bobík Kubát; Imran Musa Zangi; Jan Mann; Peter Pavlík; Jiří Chlumecký; Antonín Smrčka
- Website: yoyoband.cz

Yo Yo Band is a Czech band from Prague formed in 1975 by Richard Tesařík, Vladimír Tesařík, Ondřej Hejma, and Julius Novotný Kuzma. The group achieved the peak of its success in the 1990s, with such hits as "Karviná", "Jedem do Afriky", "Rybitví", and "Kladno".

== History ==
=== Formation, early years: 1975–83 ===
In 1975, brothers Richard and Vladimír Tesařík, together with Ondřej Hejma and Julius Novotný-Kuzma, formed Yo Yo Band as a vocal quartet in Prague, and began by playing soul and gospel songs. They remained in this formation until 1980, when Novotný-Kuzma was replaced by Jindřich Malík and Luděk Walter took the place of Hejma. They had an accompanying band for a while, which included Miroslav Linhart on guitar, and they adopted a reggae style into their musical repertoire. Yo Yo Band's collaboration with their backing ensemble ended in 1983, though Linhart remained as a new member, making the group a quintet.

=== Reshaping the band: 1984–87 ===
In 1984, Yo Yo Band became a trio consisting of the Tesařík brothers and Miroslav Linhart. They began to write more original songs, with reggae and Latin influences. They soon added trumpeter Roman Bobík Kubát. In 1986, Iranian-born physician-cum-musician Imran Musa Zangi joined the band as percussionist. They recorded their debut album, Velbloud, ten se má..., and released it the following year. New members were added, in the form of Jan Mann (congas, percussion) and Jiří Šíma (saxophone, keyboards, vocals).

=== Height of success: 1988–95 ===
Yo Yo Band released their second album, Do bačkor ne..., in 1988, and opened for English reggae-pop band UB40 at their concert in Prague the same year. In 1989, they toured Czechoslovakia with Danish reggae band Bushbeater, and travelled with them to a music festival in Aalborg, Denmark, the following year. Also in 1990, they released their third album, titled Lehkou chůzí, which spawned one of their most popular singles, "Kladno", a song with a distinctly Latin flavour. The band's fourth album, Karviná, released in 1993, became their most successful, and gained a large amount of airplay in the Czech Republic. Karviná was nominated in four categories at the 1994 Anděl Awards and won three of them – Composition of the Year ("Rybitví"), Album of the Year, and Band of the Year. The album was also certified Platinum for the sale of 130,000 copies. At this point, Zangi and Mann left the band. In 1995, Yo Yo Band added drummer Pavel Razím and bass player Peter Pavlík, and released their fifth album, Jenom kouř, which included another big hit, "Jedem do Afriky".

=== Gejza, book, and other projects: 1997–2000 ===
In 1997, Yo Yo Band released their next album, Gejza. Additionally, a book about the band, titled Yo Yo Band: národní umělci s černou muzikou, was published by author Kazi Jůzová. In 1999, the Tesařík brothers took a break from Yo Yo Band to focus on other projects. They released an album as a duo, titled Plavu si, ani nevím jak, made guest appearances on a number of albums by other artists, including Laura a její tygři, Sto zvířat, and Lucie, and performed as gravediggers in the Janek Ledecký opera Hamlet. A year later, as a trio with Jindřich Malík, they released the album Soul.

=== New album, tragedy, lineup changes: 2001–present ===
In 2001, Yo Yo Band released the record Souboj na kuchyňský nože, their latest album of original material to date. Two years later, founding member Vladimír Tesařík died from injuries sustained after a bicycle collision, at the age of 55. Trombonist and percussionist Jan Šatra joined the band in 2004. Two years later, bassist Peter Pavlík left and was replaced by Václav Venor Novotný. In 2018, trumpeter Roman Bobík Kubát left to join the Czech National Symphony Orchestra, and was replaced by Roman Němec.

Richard Tesařík died on 6 September 2026, at the age of 80.

== Band members ==
Current

- Miroslav Linhart – guitar, vocals
- Jiří Šíma – saxophone, keyboards, vocals
- Pavel Razím – drums
- Jan Šatra – trombone, percussion
- Václav Venor Novotný – bass guitar, vocals
- Roman Němec – trumpet
- Lukáš Pelikán – guitar
- Filip Jiskra – trombone, percussion

Past

- Vladimír Tesařík – vocals, keyboards (died 2003)
- Richard Tesařík – vocals, percussion (died 2026)
- Ondřej Hejma – vocals, guitar
- Julius Novotný-Kuzma – vocals
- Jindřich Malík – vocals
- Luděk Walter – vocals
- Roman Bobík Kubát – trumpet
- Imran Musa Zangi – congas, percussion
- Jan Mann – drums, percussion
- Peter Pavlík – double bass
- Jiří Chlumecký – vocals, keyboards, drums
- Antonín Smrčka – bass guitar

== Discography ==
Studio albums

- Velbloud, ten se má... (1987)
- Do bačkor ne... (1988)
- Lehkou chůzí (1990)
- Karviná (1993)
- Jenom kouř (1995)
- Gejza (1997)
- Souboj na kuchyňský nože (2001)

Compilations

- Best of Yo Yo Band (1994)
- Dej mi prachy na klobouk (1994)
- Trocha z nejlepšího a ještě něco... (2004)
- Singly (2017)

Other albums

- Plavu si, ani nevím jak – Bratři Tesaříci (1999)
- Soul – Vladimír Tesařík, Richard Tesařík, and Jindřich Malík (2000)
