= Martin Přikryl =

Martin Přikryl may refer to:

- Martin Přikryl (developer), author of WinSCP
- Martin Přikryl (tennis), (born 10 June 1992), Czech ATP player
- Martin Přikryl (musician), member of Czech band The Prostitutes
