= False Flag (disambiguation) =

A false flag operation is an act committed with the intent of disguising the actual source of responsibility and pinning blame on another party.

False Flag may also refer to:

- False Flag (film), 2017 Nigerian film
- False Flag (TV series), 2015 Israeli television series
- "False Flag" (Burn Notice), a 2007 television episode
- "False Flag" (The Copenhagen Test), a 2025 television episode
- "False Flag" (Waking the Dead), a 2004 television episode
- False Flag (EP), 2016 EP by The Desperate Mind
