= Chcete být milionářem? =

2000 Czech TV game show

- Logo of Chcete být milionářem?
- Created by: David Briggs; Steven Knight; Mike Whitehill
- Presented by: Vladimír Čech (2000–2003); Martin Preiss (2003–2004); Ondřej Hejma (2005); Marek Vašut (2016–2017)
- Country of origin: Czech Republic

Production
- Running time: 30 minutes, after 22nd episode part 50 minutes, the new version 80 minutes
- Production companies: CET 21 (2000–2005); Endemol Shine Group (2016–2017)

Original release
- Network: TV Nova
- Release: 16 October 2000 – 23 August 2017

Chcete být milionářem? (English translation: Do you want to be a millionaire?) is a Czech game show based on the original British format of Who Wants to Be a Millionaire?. The show was hosted by Vladimír Čech, Martin Preiss, Ondřej Hejma, and Marek Vašut (consecutively). The main goal of the game is to win 10 million Kč by answering 15 multiple-choice questions correctly. There were 3 lifelines, in the new version, a 4th lifeline was added - fifty fifty (50:50), phone a friend (přítel na telefonu), ask the audience (rada publika) and help of the one from audience (pomoc diváka z publika). The game show was broadcast on TV Nova. When a contestant correctly answered the fifth question, they could leave with at least 10,000 Kč. When a contestant got the tenth question correct, they could leave with at least 320,000 Kč. Nobody won the main prize. The format was briefly adopted by another TV station under the name Milionář. The show was on from 2000 to 2005, before returning in March 2016 with new Risk format, which eliminates the second safety net after the tenth question. The 2016 episodes were recorded Gravity Media in Hürth, where German and Austrian versions were shot as well. In June 2017, the show returned to air.

== Money tree ==
Question number	Value
1	1,000 Kč
2	2,000 Kč
3	3,000 Kč
4	5,000 Kč
5	10,000 Kč
6	20,000 Kč
7	40,000 Kč
8	80,000 Kč
9	160,000 Kč
10	320,000 Kč
11	640,000 Kč
12	1,250,000 Kč
13	2,500,000 Kč
14	5,000,000 Kč
15	10,000,000 Kč
