= Czech hip-hop =

Subculture in the Czech Republic

Hip-hop subculture emerged in the Czech Republic after the Velvet Revolution in 1989. Since then, various groups, clubs, and festivals have appeared across the country. Notable hip-hop artists include Chaozz, Gipsy.cz, Naše Věc, Prago Union, Řezník, and DJ Wich.

== History ==
=== 1980s and 1990s ===
Hip-hop culture, or rapping as a vocal component of hip-hop, has been developing in Czechoslovakia since the 1980s, mainly in large cities such as Prague, Brno, and Plzeň. The first instance of what can be called hip-hop in the country is attributed to Lesík Hajdovský and his band Manželé, with their 1985 hit song "Jižák". The track gained renewed popularity in the mid-1990s, when it was remixed by the hip-hop group Peneři strýčka Homeboye.

Among early adopters of the genre were Piráti, a band from Hradec Králové, active from 1988 to 1991, who combined hip-hop with rock. Following the 1989 Velvet Revolution, the Prague-based award-winning group J.A.R. performed a blend of hip-hop, rock, and funk, remaining active to the present day. The trio Rapmasters, active for a decade starting in 1989, fused hip-hop with dance, releasing five studio albums during their career. The group WWW issued their first demo in 1993, and they have remained active to this day.

One of the most popular groups of the genre are Chaozz, active from 1995 until 2002 and again since 2017, who spun off the duo Prago Union in 2002. The group Syndrom Snopp formed in 1997 and disbanded in 2006. The duo Indy & Wich formed in 1998 and remained active until 2006, putting out two studio albums. 1998 also saw the creation of Pio Squad, a hip-hop group based in the city of Jihlava. Naše Věc, a group based in Brno, released two studio albums between 1997 and 2006. The eastern city of Zlín saw the birth of DeFuckTo, active from 1999 to 2016.

=== 2000s–present ===
The Prague-based hip-hop duo Supercrooo formed in 2004 and released several albums before disbanding in 2007. 2004 witnessed the formation of the Romani hip-hop group Gipsy.cz, active to the present, as well as initial activity by the rapper Řezník.

== Festivals ==
- Hip Hop Kemp is a former annual international hip-hop festival held in Hradec Králové. Established in 2002, it was considered one of the largest events of its kind in Europe. The last edition took place in 2019.
- Urban Rapublic was a Czech and German hip hop and reggae festival held annually in June.

== Notable artists ==
- Benny Cristo
- Cashanova Bulhar
- Chaozz
- DeFuckTo
- DJ Wich
- Ektor
- Fosco Alma
- Gipsy.cz
- Hugo Toxxx
- Idea
- Indy & Wich
- James Cole
- LA4
- Labello
- Lvcas Dope
- Marpo
- MC Gey
- Michajlov
- Naše Věc
- Nik Tendo
- Orion
- Paulie Garand
- Peneři strýčka Homeboye
- Pio Squad
- Prago Union
- Rapmasters
- Rest
- Řezník
- Rigor Mortiz
- Schyzo
- Sergei Barracuda
- Sharlota
- Smack One
- Supercrooo
- Syndrom Snopp
- Tyler Durden
- Viktor Sheen
- Vladimir 518
- WWW
- Yzomandias
