= E!E =

Czech punk rock band

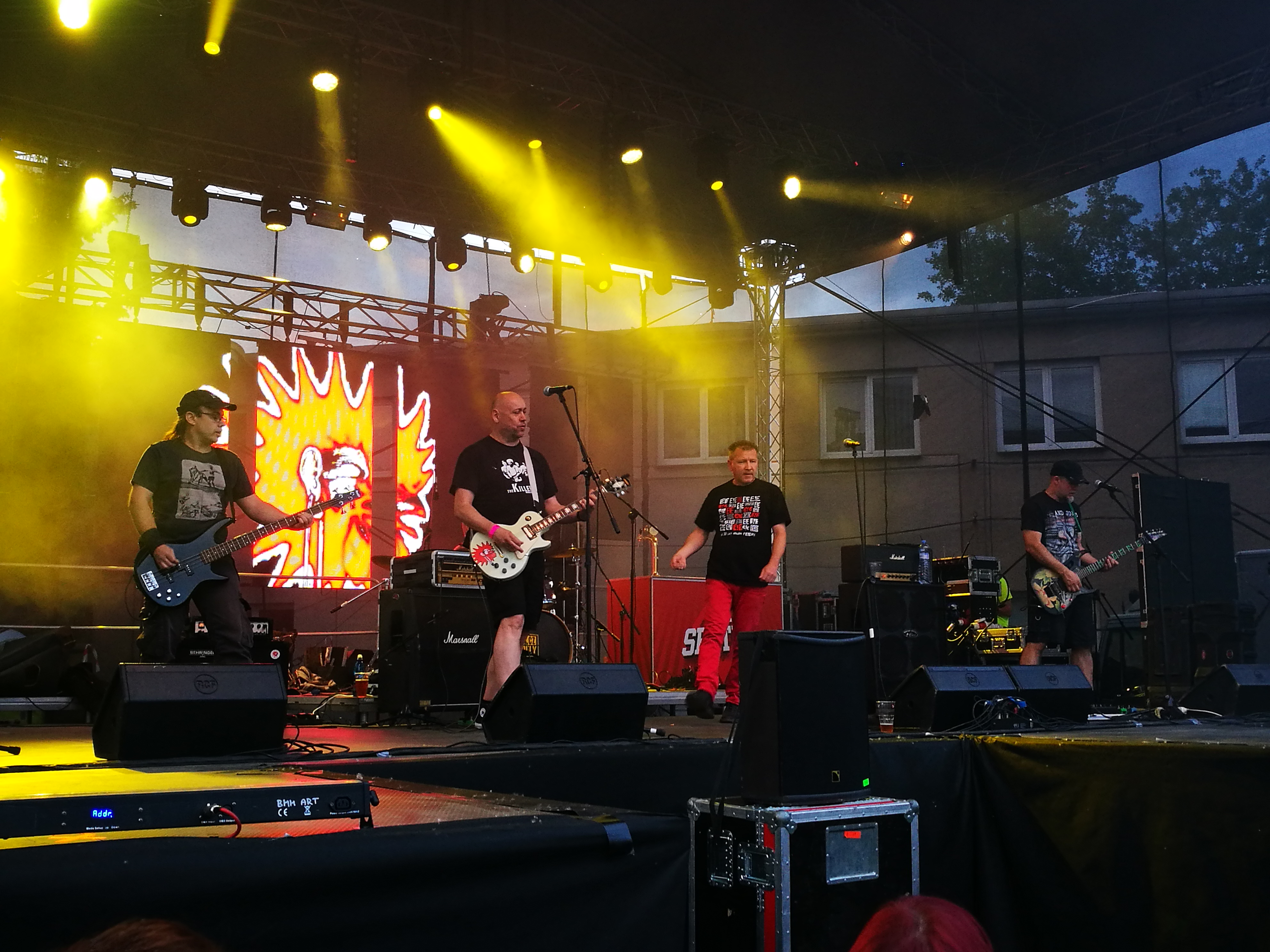
- E!E in 2017. L–R: Mottl, Stawarz, Řehoř, Davídek

Background information
- Also known as: Eečka, Éčka
- Origin: Příbram, Czechoslovakia
- Genres: Punk rock
- Years active: 1987–present
- Members: Bořivoj Řehoř; Petr Stawarz; Petr Mottl; Roman Vojtíšek
- Past members: Vilda Řapek; Miroslav Berger; Robert Kyselo; Petr Bakalerov; Ladislav Havlík
- Website: eecka.eu

E!E is a Czech punk rock band from Příbram, founded in 1987. The band consists of Bořivoj Řehoř (vocals), Petr Bakalerov (lead guitar and vocals), Petr Stawarz (guitar), Petr Mottl (bass), and Roman Vojtíšek (drums).

== History ==
E!E was formed at the end of 1987 in Příbram, Czechoslovakia. It was originally made up of Robert Kyselo on drums, Vilda Řapek on bass guitar and vocals, Petr "Bakča" Bakalerov on guitar and vocals, and Miroslav Bergerstein on accordion and vocals. The band held their first performance in 1988. The same year, Řapek and Bergerstein left and Bořivoj "Bořek" Řehoř joined on bass. He passed bass duties to Petr "Motlík" Mottl shortly after and took over on vocals full-time.

E!E recorded their first cassette, titled Obyčejní poserové, in 1988. After this release, Bakalerov, the only remaining founding member, moved to Písek, and Ladislav Havlík was hired to take over guitar duties. The group continued to perform as E!E with him, while playing as Hilfe Schule with Bakalerov, though the two entities eventually merged, retaining both guitarists and their original name. Havlík was replaced by Petr Stawarz in 1991. The group's lineup stabilized in 1992 after the arrival of drummer Roman Vojtíšek.

E!E went on to release a number of albums, starting with 0001 in 1992 and followed by Poslouchej (1993), Mrtvák (1995), and Deska (1996). On 7 July 1996, they opened for the Sex Pistols at Prague's Sportovní hala.

Bořivoj Řehoř subsequently left the band, leaving Bakalerov as the sole vocalist. In 1998, E!E released the album Děláme co můžem. A year later, the band, together with Řehoř, re-recorded 26 older tracks and released them as a compilation, under the name Dvacet pe!ecek + bonus, after which Řehoř rejoined on vocals. Two albums followed: Lepší už to nebude in 2006 and 2012 in its eponymous year.

On 15 December 2013, E!E founding member Petr Bakalerov died. Several well-known Czech punk bands took part in a commemorative concert, including Visací zámek and Tři sestry. Guitarist Robin Davídek plays with the band as a guest to this day.

In 2017, the group celebrated thirty years of existence with the release of their second compilation, titled E!E 30 let panknrolu a chlastu.

== Band members ==
Current

- Bořivoj "Bořek" Řehoř – vocals (1988–present)
- Petr "Motlík" Mottl – bass (1988–present)
- Petr "Stawy" Stawarz – guitar (1991–present)
- Roman "Spejbl" Vojtíšek – drums (1992–present)

Past

- Vilda Řapek – bass (1987–1988)
- Miroslav Bergerstein – accordion, vocals (1987–1988)
- Robert Kyselo – drums (1987–1992)
- Petr "Bakča" Bakalerov – lead guitar, vocals (1987–2013)
- Ladislav Havlík – guitar (1989–1991)

Guest musicians

- Robin Davídek – guitar (2013–present)

== Discography ==
Studio albums

- Obyčejní poserové (1988)
- 0001 (1992)
- Poslouchej (1993)
- Mrtvák (1995)
- Deska (1996)
- Děláme co můžem (1998)
- Lepší už to nebude - 2006
- 2012 (2012)

Live albums

- Mrtvák + DVD (1995)
- Rock Kafe Live (2003)
- Furt živjE!E (2020)

Compilations

- Dvacet pe!ecek + bonus (2000)
- E!E 30 let panknrolu a chlastu (2017)
