= Sto zvířat =

Czech ska and reggae band

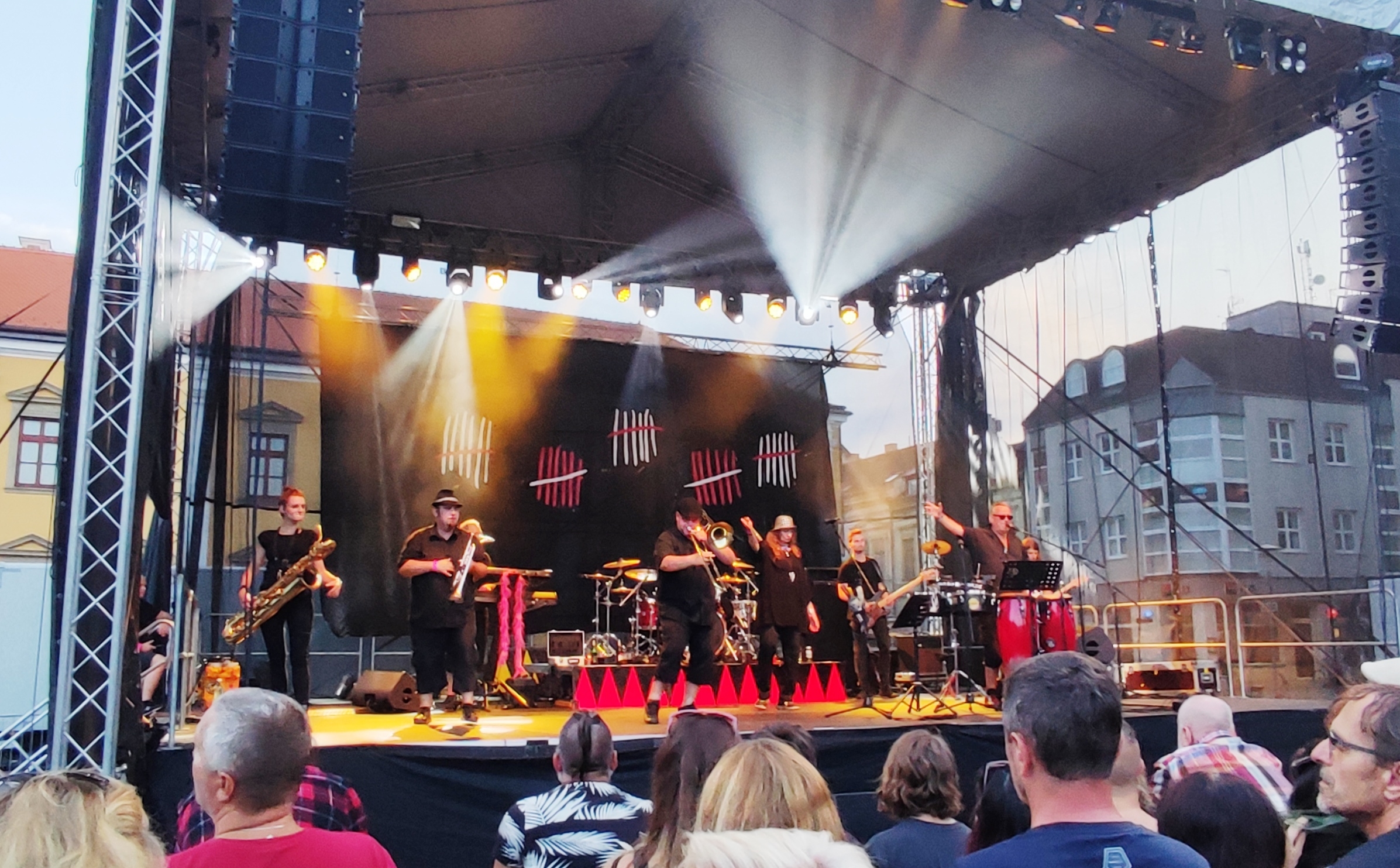
Sto zvířat performing in Uherské Hradiště.

Sto zvířat is a Czech club band which plays ska and reggae music. The band was formed in 1990 in Prague on the base of rock 'n' roll band Matěj Čech. The band has performed at many festivals including, for example, Zámostí, Rock for People, Sázavafest, United Islands of Prague, Mezi ploty, and Colours of Ostrava.

== History ==
Drummer Kalina and saxophone player Belko began to compose music during their student's years in Matěj Čech rock 'n' roll band (founded in 1983). The group combined rock 'n' roll music with playful lyrics typical for their future band Sto zvířat. They split up in 1988. Belko joined Garáž (later Garage) for a brief time. Belko and Kalina reunited in 1990 and formed Sto zvířat. The band's initial concert was held in Malostranská beseda in the autumn of 1990. From the very beginning, the band members were also involved in many artistic activities outside the music, for example in the series of fine arts happenings Pavilon pro Sto zvířat (Pavilion for Sto zvířat). The first album Sto zvířat came out in 1991. It was followed by a series of concerts outside the Czech Republic (France, Germany, Switzerland) and few appearances in television. Despite the status of mainly domestic festival group, Sto zvířat also departed for two American tours in 1996 and 1997. Some of the members became active in theatre during the second half of the 1990s. After a series of personal changes (which continue up to these days) Sto zvířat achieved noticeable success in the mainstream with their album Ty vole, na základní škole... for a major label Sony Music in 2002. An interesting moment in the band's career came with a set of 2 DVDs Jste normální?, which includes parts of two concerts in Palác Akropolis where the band performed together with several well-known Czech and Slovak musicians (e.g. David Koller, Wohnout, Miroslav Žbirka, etc.) and many bonuses mapping their history. Lead singer and author of many songs Petr Ostrouchov left Sto Zvířat in 2006. The band got awarded with the Czech music award Anděl in category ska and reggae in 2008. Sto zvířat remains one of the most popular ska bands in the country. Tomáš Belko, one of the founding members of the band, left Sto zvířat in 2014 but remains the author of the band's lyrics. In 2021, 3 members left the band at once to start their own project, but were immediately replaced by new members.

== Members ==
- Jana Jelínková – lead vocals (since 1990)
- Jan Kalina – percussion, lead vocals, graphic design, production (1990–2023)
- Jakub Červinka – guitar (since 2021)
- Jan Neruda – bass guitar (since 2021)
- Petr Hostinský – keyboards, vocals (since 2004)
- Jiří Hanzlík – baritone saxophone (since 1999)
- Martin Líska – trombone (since 2001)
- Pavel Herzog – trumpet (since 2006)
- Jakub Nývlt – drums (since 2021)

== Former members ==
- Petr Pivoňka – guitar (1990–1991)
- Josef Doubrava – bass guitar, vocals (1990–1994)
- Arnošt Hanf – keyboards, vocals (1990–2001)
- Vlastimil Bičík – keyboards (2001–2004)
- Tomáš Belko – tenor saxophone, vocals, lyrics (1990–2014)
- Jiří Tvrdík – guitar (1991–1993)
- Petr Ostrouchov – guitar, lead vocals, bass guitar, keyboards, percussion, production (1993–2006)
- Ladislav Přitasil – bass guitar (1994–2003)
- Luboš Krtička – trumpet (2000–2003)
- Tomáš Krček – drums (2001–2007)
- Michal Lamač – trumpet (2003–2006)

== Discography ==
- Sto zvířat, 1993
- Druhá brada, 1996
- Bambule, 1998
- Krok stranou, 1999
- Ty vole, na základní škole..., 2002 (with John Harle)
- Nikdy nic nebylo, 2004
- Jste normální?, 2006
- Rozptýlení pro pozůstalé, 2007
- Postelový scény, 2009
- Sto dvacet, 2011
- Hraju na klavír v bordelu, 2012
- Tlustej chlapeček se včelou v kalhotách, 2013
- Ministerstvo mýho nitra, 2015
- Dáma s čápem, 2017
