= Prago Union =

Czech hip-hop group

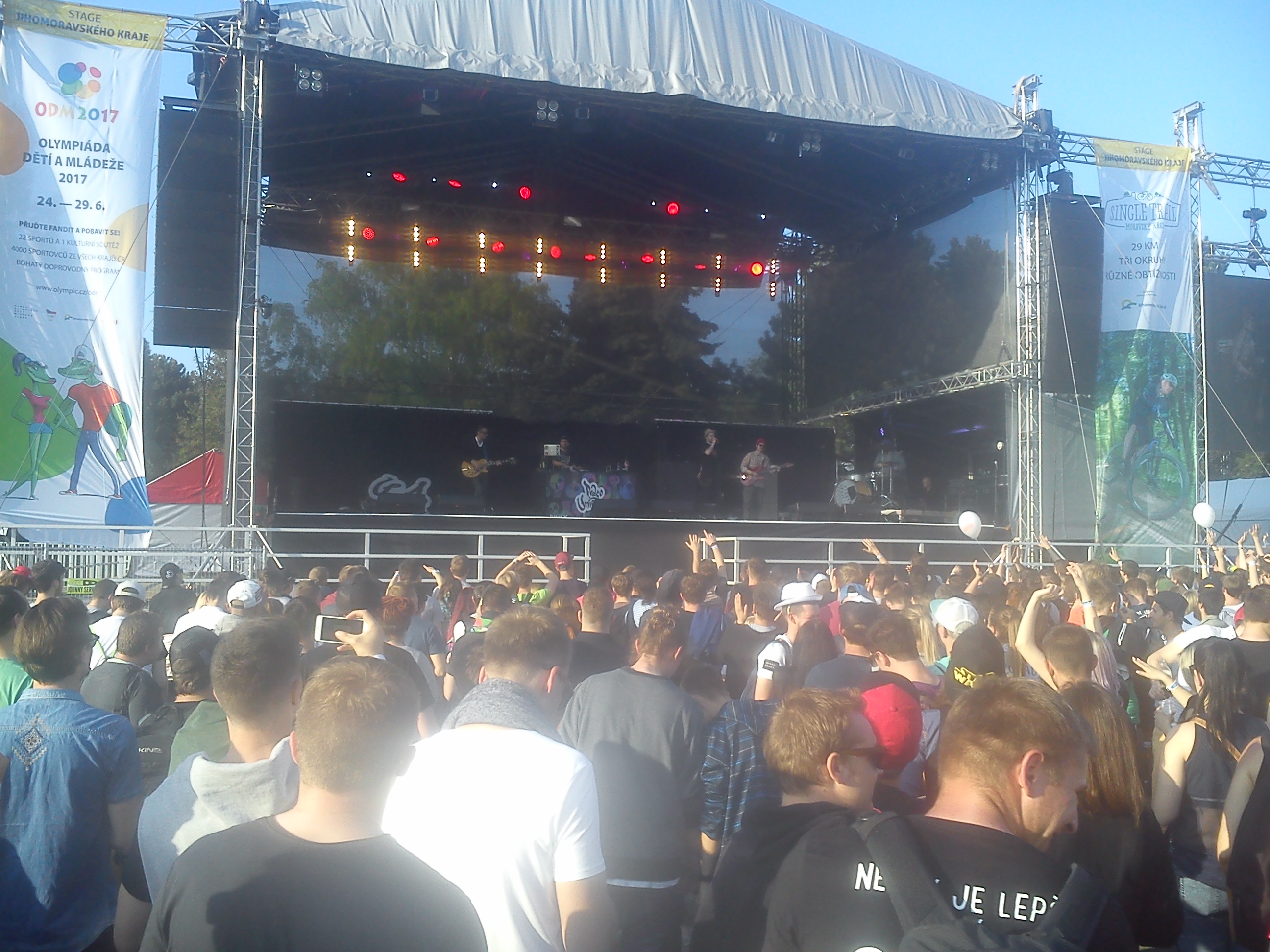
- Prago Union performing in 2017

Background information
- Origin: Prague, Czech Republic
- Genres: Hip-hop
- Years active: 2002–present
- Spinoff of: Chaozz
- Awards: 2010 Anděl Award for Hip-hop & R'n'b Album of the Year; 2011 Anděl Award for Hip-hop Album of the Year
- Members: MC Kato; DJ Maro
- Past members: DJ Skupla
- Website: pragounion.cz

Prago Union is a Czech hip-hop group established in 2002 in Prague. It consists of MC Kato and DJ Maro. As of 2026, they have released nine studio albums.

== History ==
Prago Union was formed in 2002 by MC Kato (formerly known as Deph) and DJ Skupla, both of whom were previously members of the hip-hop group Chaozz. Their live performances were supplemented by rapper Dědek and DJ Büphe. Their first album was HDP (Hrubej domácí produkt), released in 2005, which included contributions from American producer Kutmasta Kurt and rappers Masta Ace, Ed O.G., Dendemann, and Planet Asia.

Skupla left in 2008 and was replaced by DJ Maro. Prago Union's second record, Dezorient Express, came out in 2010 and was immediately praised by both fans and critics. It won that year's Anděl Award in the category Hip-hop & R'n'b. The same year, Prago Union also premiered their backing band, named Livě Band and consisting of Radimo, El Boogie Man, Watcha, and Mraky Mrak. In addition, they gave away a set of free tracks collected under the title Metronom.

Prago Union's third album, V Barvách, released in 2011, won another Anděl Award, in the Hip-hop category. They went on to publish Vážná hudba (2013), Smrt žije (2016), and Perpetum promile (2019). Their 2021 record, Made in Strašnice, earned them an Anděl nomination for group of the year. In 2022, Prago Union released Příduhned, followed by Zvukoloď in 2024.

== Band members ==
Current

- MC Kato
- DJ Maro

Past

- DJ Skupla

Touring members

- Dědek
- DJ Büphe
- Livě Band: Radimo, El Boogie Man, Watcha, Mraky Mrak

== Discography ==
Studio albums

- HDP (Hrubej domácí produkt) (2005)
- Dezorient Express (2010)
- V Barvách (2011)
- Vážná hudba (2013)
- Smrt žije (2016)
- Perpetum promile (2019)
- Made in Strašnice (2021)
- Příduhned (2022)
- Zvukoloď (2024)

EPs

- Gold Chain Mew-Zick II / Verbální Atentát / Uprchlík with Dědek (2005)
- Drummond meets Prago Union (2014)

Live albums

- Bezdrátová Šňůra (G2 Acoustic Stage Live) (2016)

Compilations

- Metronom (2010)
- V Barvách instrumental (Metronom 3) (2011)
- Odložené chlebíčky (Metronom 2) (2013)
- MTRNM IV (2016)
- Mimo jiné (2022)
- Metronom 5.0: Zvuky z podpalubí (2024)

Other albums

- Pohřební hlídka split with Rigor Mortiz (2023)
- A)TÝM – A)TÝM, Rest, and Prago Union (2024)

== Awards and recognition ==
- 2010 Anděl Award for Hip-hop & R'n'b Album of the Year
- 2011 Anděl Award for Hip-hop Album of the Year
- 2021 Anděl Award nomination for Group of the Year
