= The Sads =

Czech indie rock band

- Origin: Prague, Czech Republic
- Genres: Indie rock
- Years active: 1998–present
- Labels: none
- Members: Steven Rusling; Matt Ford; Nick Jennings; Mark Tierney; Marc Cram
- Past members: James Babson

The Sads are an indie-rock band based in Prague, Czech Republic, with five members from Canada, America, and Scotland.

== Overview ==
The Sads' first release was the 1998 single, "On The Back Of A Billygoat" and two EPs titled Our Lives Abide In Heaven and The Sads which were released on a small indie label, Fairly Good Records. Following these releases, in 2008, The Sads signed briefly to Free Records, in the UK, resulting in their debut album Pregnancy Scare on October 17, 2008, a dual-album release party with The Tower of Dudes at Palac Akropolis in Prague.

Pregnancy Scare was produced by The Sads themselves (with mastering by Ron Synovitz). Mojo magazine gave the album four stars in a review that dubbed the disc "an album that exudes stark hollow originality, without the burden of personal narrative". The production has been described as baroque, “using a many layers, piano, organs, strings and so on, at or just below the volume at which they can be distinguished."

The Sads have many festivals around the world including the 2007 Glastonbury Festival, Electric Picnic (Ireland), Love City (Czech Republic), and Alt (Germany).

== Discography ==
=== Albums ===
- Pregnancy Scare (2008)

=== EPs ===
- Our Lives Abide In Heaven (EP) (2002)
- The Sads (EP) (2004)

=== Singles ===
- "On The Back Of A Billygoat" (July, 1998)
- "I Am The Beach Boy Who Died In The Ocean" (July, 2002)
- "Phoebe Cates" (October, 2004)

=== Compilation appearances ===
- "Songs For František Skála" ("Prague Presents...", 2007)
- PIMC "Prague Independent Music collective Plan 1A" (2007)
- "Kenspiracy: A tribute to the music of Ken Nash" (2009)
