= Umbrtka =

Czech metal band

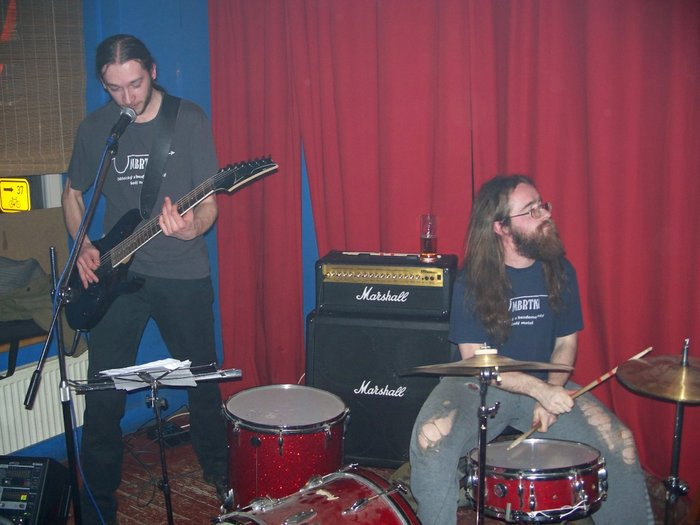
- A rare concert of Umbrtka

Background information
- Origin: Plzeň, Czech Republic
- Genres: Black metal, industrial metal, underground, doom metal
- Years active: 1999 – present
- Labels: Metalswamp
- Members: Morbivod; Strastinen; Well; Karl

Umbrtka is a metal band from Plzeň, Czech Republic. The band describe their music, which incorporates black, doom, industrial metal elements and is influenced by Czech underground, as 'grey' metal. The main themes of their lyrics are deserted industrial areas, factories, power plants, railways, dirty streets, trains, and other industrial elements.

'Umbrtka' is a name for a 'deity' which rules the grey industrial world. It is based on a working-class man called Ivo Krátký, formerly employed in Skart, Plzeň's scrapyard which, within the band's lyrics, is considered a 'temple of labor'.

== Discography ==
=== Full albums ===
- Zašpinit slunce (To Pollute the Sun) (2000)
- Dělnický a bezdomovecký šedý metal (Worker's and Homeless Gray Metal ) (2001)
- Kladivo pracuje na 110% (The Hammer Works at 110%) (2001)
- Kovostroj plzeňských pánů práce (Metalmachine of Plzeň's Labour Lords) (2001)
- Hymny šedé síly (Hymns of the Grey Force) (2002)
- Ozvěny špíny (Echoes of Dirt) (2002)
- Betonová opona (The Concrete Curtain) (2002)
- Nad propastí dne (Above the Abyss of the Day) (2003)
- Melša - Frank Zappa meets Darkthrone (2003)
- Paměti špinavé lávky (Memories of the Dirty Footbridge) (2004)
- Lití podzimního asfaltu (The Casting of Autumn Asphalt) (2005)
- Páně & Uhelná pánev (The Lord & The Coal Basin) (2 cd, 2008)
- Úplná demontáž lidstva (The Complete Disassembly of Mankind) (2009)
- Kovový háj (The Metal Grove) (2010)
- IVO - Industriální Velké Obrození (The Great Industrial Renaissance) (2010)
- Spočinutí (Resting) (2011)
- KKW (2012)
- Selement (2012)
- V dešti mech (Moss in the Rain) (2014)
- Hlavní stroj (The Master Machine) (2016)
- Komíny Smrti (The Chimneys of Death) (2019)
- Přesazování strejců (The Reseating of Uncles) (2022)

=== EPs ===
- Jaro nevidět (2011, digital download)

=== LPs ===
- Kovový háj (2012)
- Úplná demontáž lidstva (2013)

=== Demos ===
- The Hand of Nothingness (2003)
