= Chaozz =

Czech hip hop group

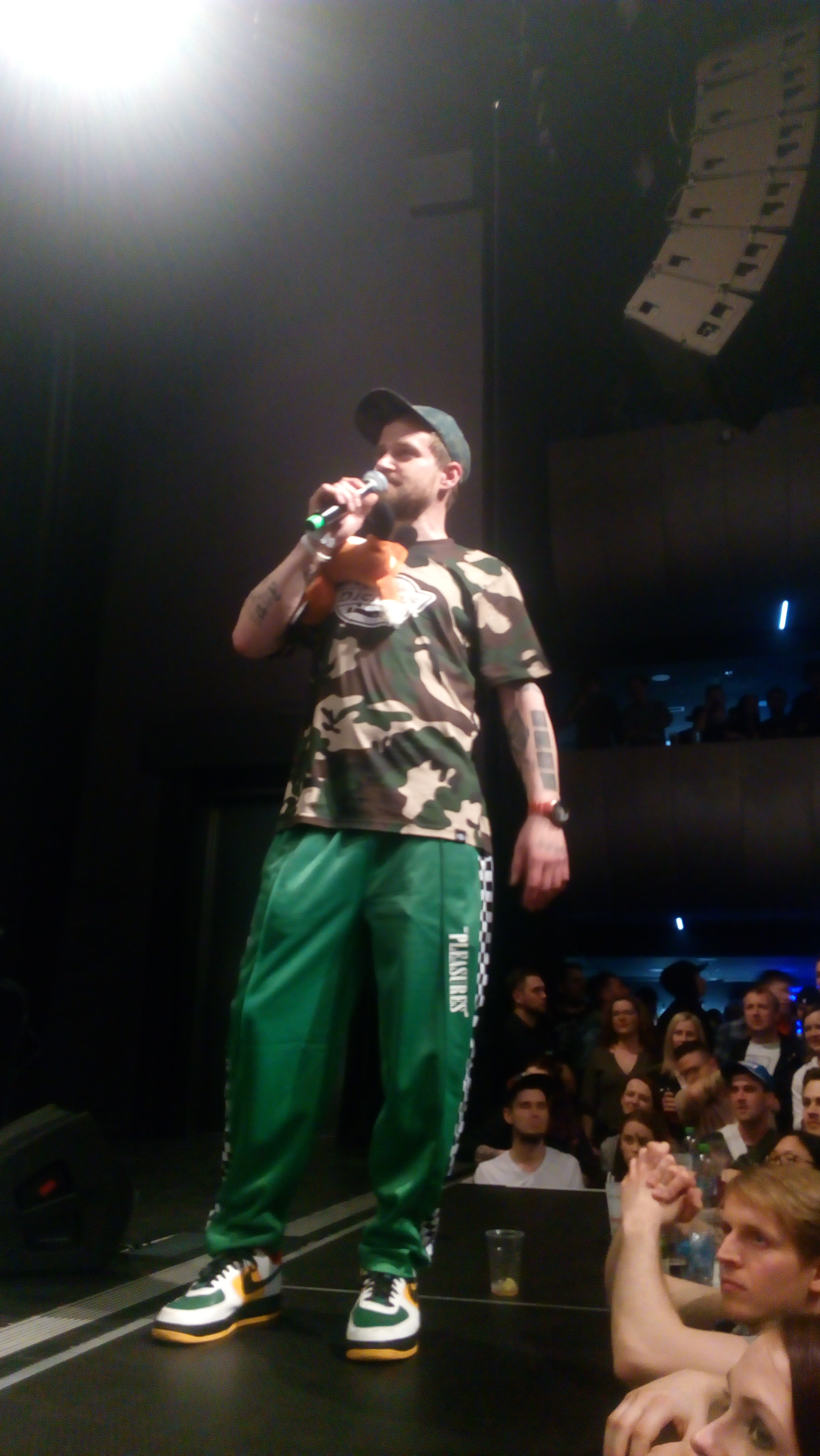
- MC Kato performing with Chaozz in 2018

Background information
- Origin: Prague, Czech Republic
- Genres: Hip-hop
- Years active: 1995–2002; 2017–present
- Labels: Polygram; Universal
- Spinoffs: Prago Union
- Members: Bass; MC Kato; Rusty; Fugaz; DJ Skupla
- Past members: DJ Smog
- Website: chaozz.cz

Chaozz is a Czech hip-hop group active from 1995 to 2002, during which time they released four studio albums. They reformed in 2017 and have since published one single.

== History ==
Chaozz was formed in 1995 by musicians Bass, MC Deph, Rusty, Fugaz, and DJ Smog. Bass and Rusty had previously been members of another hip hop group, UNIT, established in 1993, and MC Deph had released a solo record before working with Fugaz on a project called Flavamatic. UNIT disbanded in 1994, with Bass and Rusty joining DJ Smog to form the group Chaozz. Shortly afterward, the two groups merged under the name Chaozz.

The group began to achieve success after meeting Ivo Pospíšil, a record store owner who had contacts at PolyGram. In 1996, they released their first album, ...a nastal chaos. Following this, they worked with Slovak group No Gravity on the track "Chaozz věci", which was used in several commercials and received airplay on TV Nova as well as on radio.

In 2002, after four albums, the group disbanded. Deph joined former UNIT colleague DJ Skupla to form another group, Prago Union, and Bass is a DJ who performs under the name Ba2s. In 2017, Chaozz got back together. A year later, they released the single "Průvan", their first original material since reforming.

== Band members ==
Current

- Bass, aka Ba2s – rap
- MC Deph, aka MC Kato – rap
- Rusty – rap
- Fugaz – rap
- DJ Skupla – DJ

Past

- DJ Smog – DJ (1994–97)

== Discography ==
=== Studio albums ===
- ...a nastal chaos (1996)
- Zprdeleklika (1997)
- P.E.S. (1999)
- Sakum prdum (2001)

=== EPs ===
- Planeta Opic (1996)
- Zprdelevinyl (1997)
- Sekec Mazec (2001)

=== Compilations ===
- Inventura (2002)
- 20 Let Chaozzu (2013)
