= Maxim Turbulenc =

Czech pop group

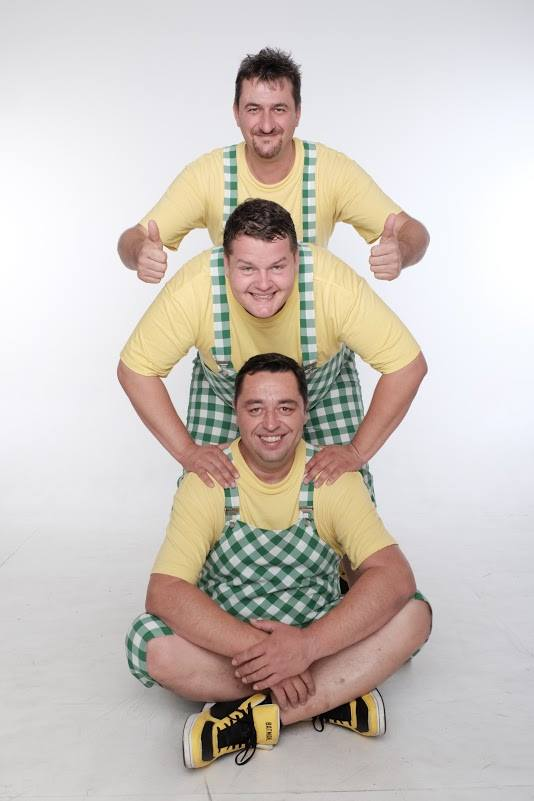
- Maxim Turbulenc in 2015

Background information
- Origin: Prague, Czech Republic
- Genres: Children's music; comedy music; remixes
- Years active: 1994–present
- Spinoffs: Maxíci
- Members: Petr Novák; Tomáš Báča
- Past members: Petr Panocha; Pavel Vohnout; Dan Vali
- Website: maximturbulenc.cz

Maxim Turbulenc is a Czech pop group from Prague, established in 1994 by Pavel "Kyklop" Vohnout, Daniel "Dan" Vali (died 2024), and Petr "Pancha" Panocha. They mostly produce music for children, humorous songs, and dance remixes of old folk hits. In November 2005, Panocha left the group and was replaced by Petr "Ajfel" Novák. In 2015, Tomáš "Timi" Báča took the place of Vohnout. Panocha and Vohnout, together with Přemysl Stoklasa, later formed the group Maxíci, which was joined by Oskar Palecek Kowalski in 2024.

== Band members ==
Current

- Tomáš "Timi" Báča – vocals
- Petr "Ajfel" Novák – vocals, keyboards

Past

- Petr "Pancha" Panocha – vocals (1994–2005)
- Pavel "Kyklop" Vohnout – vocals (1994–2015)
- Daniel "Dan" Vali – vocals (1994–2024 [died])

== Discography ==
Albums

- Turbulence dance (1995)
- Zpívánky s Maxim Turbulenc (1996)
- Ententýci (1997)
- Nové zpívánky (1998)
- Mejdan století jenom (nejen) pro děti (1999)
- Veselé zpívánky (2000)
- Maxíci na divokém západě (2001)
- Rozpustilé zpívánky (2002)
- Maxíci na indiánské stezce (2003)
- Sakum Prdum (compilation, 2004)
- Maxim Turbulenc od A do Z (2005)
- Máme rádi zvířata (2005)
- Suprový zpívánky (2006)
- Maxim Turbulenc 2008 (2007)
- Dopravní zpívánky (2008)
- Antiethanol párty No .1 (2009)
- Sakum Prdum 2 (2010)
- Čecho Decho (2009)
- Česko Disko (2010)
- Trempo Kempo (2010)
- Hospoda je naše příroda (2010)
- Vánoční zpívánky (2011)
- Zpívá celá rodina (2012)
- Sakum Prdum 3 (2012)
- Umbaj (2015)
- Raketou na Mars (2019)
- 25 let Turbulencí (compilation, 2019)

DVDs

- Jede jede mašinka a další legrační videoklipy (2003)
- Čecho Decho (2010)
- Trempo Kempo (2010)
