= The Tower of Dudes =

Czech musical group

- Origin: Prague, Czech Republic
- Genres: Cowpunk; Gypsy punk
- Years active: 2007–present
- Label: Velvet Rut Records
- Members: Johnny Feelings; Tarah Masu; Nick Jennings (aka Silver Bucket, Nick Nack); Urban Su; Joel Fernandes; Johnny Friendly; DIRT MD; Holy Fanda
- Past members: Captain Tim Darlings; Steve Cautious; Bekr Ali (aka Tony Park, Urine Spritzer)

The Tower of Dudes is a cowpunk band. The band was formerly based in Prague, Czech Republic, and has since moved to Canada. It has members from Canada, the United States of America and England. Its musical style has been likened to folk rock and Gypsy punk.

== History ==
The Tower of Dudes was formed in 2007 by a group of expatriates living in Prague, Czech Republic. Prague has a large community of English-speaking expatriates, estimated at 30,000 in 1993. Like many of these expatriates, members of The Tower of Dudes cite various reasons for leaving their home country for the Czech Republic. In answer to an interview question from Spin TV, the English bass guitar player Steve Cautious said, "It's a small pretty city [that is] much easier to get around in than London." When asked the same question, Urine Spritzer sarcastically answered that he came for "the smiling faces". "

The Tower of Dudes' sound has been described as "punky folk", combining "punk, flamenco, folk roots, western twang, and other sounds generated by gypsies and rebels from across the globe", and as punk-folk that "benefit[s from] the hard-core mandolin of Tony Parker and the pumping thrash of Tarah Masu’s accordion. Throw in some of Parker’s edgy banjo and Nick Jennings’ extended drum kit, and it's hard keeping your feet still when the Dudes play."

In their extensive touring in the Czech Republic and Germany, the band has shared a stage with notable bands such as Frog Eyes, Immaculate Machine, O'Death, Mammasweed, Plastic People of the Universe and The Sads.

The Tower of Dudes have been based in Victoria, British Columbia, Canada since the beginning of 2011. During the latter half of 2013, they worked on their third full-length album, Make Your Own Culture. The album was released on March 1, 2014, and the band held a record-release party on March 14 in Victoria. The Tower of Dudes played their last show on June 6, 2026 at LanaLou's in Vancouver, BC "

== Appearances ==
=== Music festivals ===
- Laly Fest, Czech Republic (September 29, 2007)
- ZELIFEST, Czech Republic (April 26, 2008)
- Habrovka, Czech Republic (June 6, 2008)
- Dance Valley, Netherlands (July 12, 2008)
- Hobo Fest, Czech Republic (May 9, 2009)
- Mighty Sounds, Czech Republic (July 18, 2009)
- Trutnov Music Festival, Czech Republic (August 22, 2009)
- Skautsk Open Air Festival, Czech Republic (May 29, 2010)
- Hobo Fest, Czech Republic (August 14, 2010)
- Trutnov Music Festival, Czech Republic (August 21, 2010)
- Nahorany Festival, Czech Republic (August 28, 2010)
- Rifflandia Festival, Victoria, BC, Canada (September 22, 2011)
- FarmFest, Cowichan, BC (September 8, 2012)
- Salmon Arm Roots and Blues Festival, Salmon Arm, BC (August 18, 2013)
- Quadrapalooza, Quadra Island, BC (August 31, 2013)
- Kispiox Music Festival, Kispiox, BC (July 26, 2014)
- Artswells, Wells, BC (August 1–3, 2014)

=== Radio ===
- KenFM LIVE, Germany (February 9, 2009)

== Discography ==
=== Albums ===
- A Plan (2008)
- Earl (2010)
- Make Your Own Culture (2014)
- Boring Country Songs (2018)
- Genre Rock (2019)
- Resignation (2026)

=== EPs ===
- Reheat and Serve (2011)
- Split 45 with Black Valley Gospel (2013 - released by Velvet Rut Records)

=== Singles ===
- "Jr. High School Man" (July 2008)
- "Hibernation" (June 2010)
- "Make Your Own Culture" (June 2013)
- "We Never Learn Anything" (March 2014)

=== Music videos ===
- "Jr. High School Man" (March 2009)
- "A Plan" (July 2009)
- "Hibernation" (October 2010)
- "We Never Learn Anything" (September 2014)

=== Compilation appearances ===
- Prague Independent Music collective Plan 1A (2007)
- The interNASHional KENspiracy: A tribute to the music of Ken Nash (2009)

=== Film ===
- "Drink, Fuck, Drive Truck" and "A Clean-Living Life" were to be in the movie Onward, Amazing People!
