= Cartonnage (band) =

Czech electronic music duo

- Origin: Prague, Czech Republic
- Genres: Electronic music
- Years active: 2001—present
- Members: Vanda Choco; Armin Effenberger

Cartonnage is a Czech electronic music band formed in 2001 in Prague. It is made up of Vanda Choco (vocals/synthesizers) and Armin Effenberger (production/programming/synthesizers).

== Work ==
Their debut album, CD1, released in 2004, was nominated by Express Radio for the Golden Ear award and by Óčko for the Discovery of the Year award. Four songs from the album were used in the soundtrack to Dan Svátek's movie Close to Heaven.

Their musical success continued with the 2007 single "Patisserie" and their second album, the critically acclaimed Curiously Connected, which was released in 2008. Cartonnage were once again nominated for the TV Óčko awards as well as an Anděl Award.

In 2008, Cartonnage collaborated with Moby on a vocal edit of the track "257.zero" from his album Last Night.

Their third album, I'm Not Your Computer, was released in 2011.

In 2012, Cartonnage supported Duran Duran on their All You Need Is Now world tour.

== Discography ==
=== Albums ===
- CD1 (2004)
- Curiously Connected (2008)
- I'm Not Your Computer (2011)

=== Singles ===
- "Patisserie" (2007)
