= Ondřej Hejma =

Czech musician and writer (born 1951)

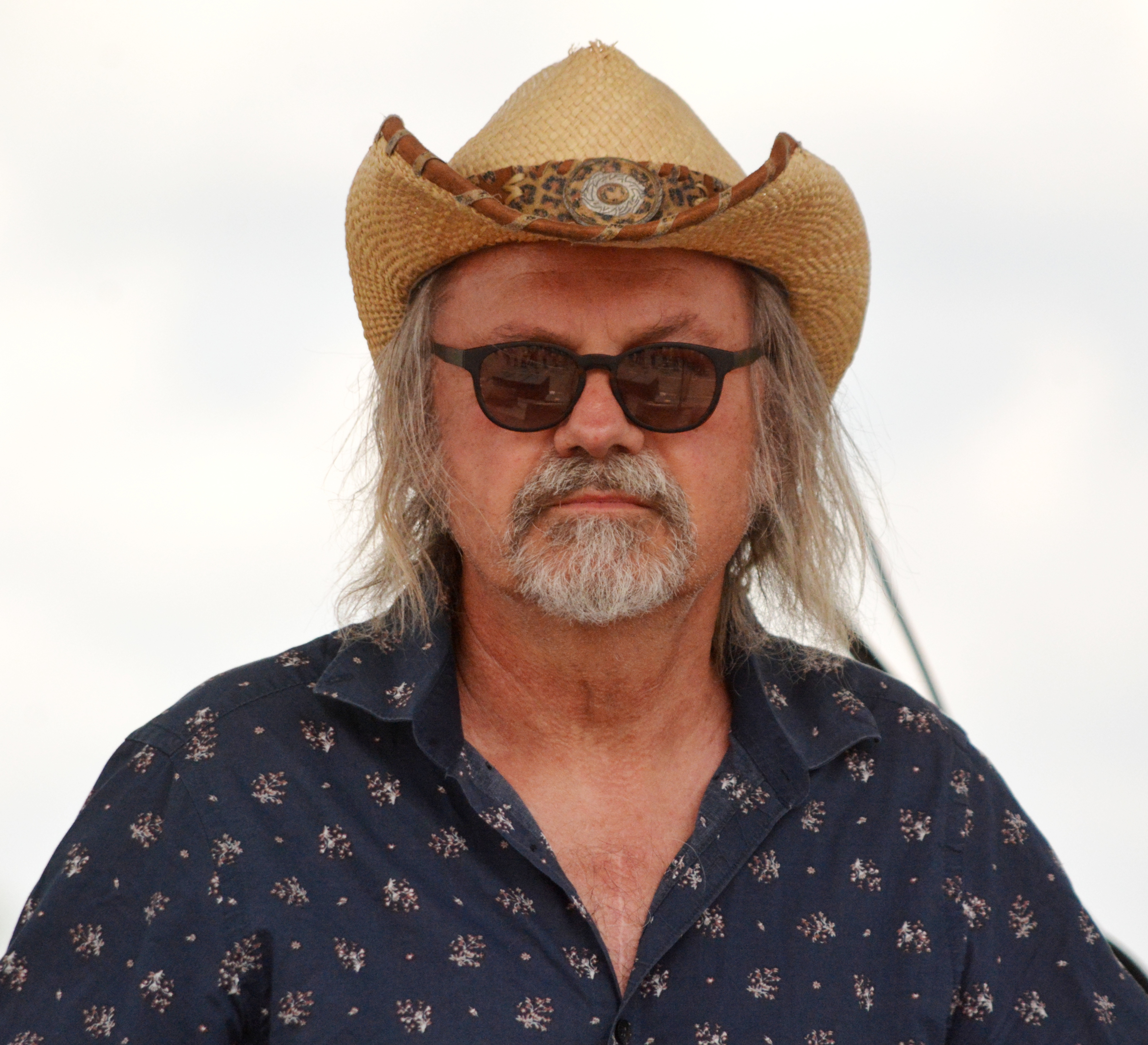
- Hejma in 2017

Background information
- Born: 3 February 1951 (age 75); Prague, Czechoslovakia
- Genres: Rock; folk
- Occupations: Singer; composer; journalist
- Instruments: Vocals; guitar
- Years active: 1971–present
- Member of: Žlutý pes
- Formerly of: Yo Yo Band

Ondřej Hejma (born 3 February 1951) is a Czech singer and songwriter, vocalist of the band Žlutý pes. After graduating, he worked as an interpreter and translator. From 1987, he worked as a correspondent for the Associated Press in Czechoslovakia and later also contributed to other Czech media. He has written three books, and is known for hosting television competitions such as Chcete být milionářem? and Česko hledá SuperStar.

== Biography ==
=== Writing and journalism ===
After high school, Hejma studied English and Chinese philology at the Faculty of Arts at Charles University in Prague, and he worked briefly in an advertising agency. In the 1970s, together with Štefan Rybár, he published the travelogue Autostopem do Nepálu (Hitchhiking to Nepal). In the 1980s, he worked as a freelance interpreter and translator, providing English-language films with Czech subtitles. He later became part of a samizdat network of film enthusiasts, for whom he provided dubbing of videotapes imported from abroad. In 1987, he became the Prague correspondent for AP. At the time, he covered key moments of the Velvet Revolution and the initial period of economic transformation. He left the agency in 2009. Hejma also wrote the "Psí život" section for Reflex magazine.

In 2012, Hejma began writing and gradually publishing the autobiographical trilogy Fejsbuk, Americký Blues, and Srdce Zlomený.

=== Music ===
In the 1960s, while still in his teens, Hejma played in the blues band Žízeň; he was also a member of Yo Yo Band and Combo FH. In 1978, he founded the group Žlutý pes. He has written most of the band's lyrics, as well as writing texts for other Czech musicians. Žlutý pes have recorded more than a dozen albums and scored a number of radio hits. In 1996, they won the Music Academy Award as Band of the Year. Hejma has also performed with the alternative project LL Jetel with Radim Hladík and Ernouš Šedivý. Since 2016, he has been a member of the acoustic group Marush.

=== Television and radio ===
Hejma has been active on TV3, hosting the show Bez kravaty, and in radio, hosting the program Press klub on Frekvence 1. On TV Nova, he hosted the Czech version of Who Wants to Be a Millionaire? called Chcete být milionářem? He was also a juror in the first and third series of Česko hledá SuperStar, the Czech version of the Idol series.

== Personal life ==
Ondřej is married, his wife Vladimíra Hejmová is a doctor. They have two children, son Jan and daughter Tereza. He lives in Řevnice.

== Discography ==
Žlutý pes

- Ondřej Hejma – Žlutý pes (1988)
- Hoši z východního bloku (1992)
- Yellow Dog (1994)
- Šala-hů, Blbej den (1996)
- Trsátko (1996)
- Poslední lžíce (1998)
- Himálaje (1999)
- Fotbalová (2000)
- Čínská otázka (2001)
- Psí kusy (ty nejlepší kousky) (2002 - compilation album)
- Rok psa (2006)
- Mellow Yellow (2008)
- Modrá je dobrá (2011)
- Stroj času (2014)

Ondřej Hejma & L.L. Jetel

- Ondřej Hejma & L.L. Jetel (2004)

Solo

- Rockin' the Blues (1987)

== Bibliography ==
- Autostopem do Nepálu (1978) with Štefan Rybár
- Fejsbuk (2012)
- Americký blues (2013)
- Srdce zlomený (2017)
