= Trollech =

Czech metal band

- Origin: Plzeň, Czech Republic
- Genres: Black metal, pagan metal
- Years active: 1999–present
- Label: Ketzer Records
- Members: Asura G.G. Ray; Lord Morbivod; Throllmas; Sheafraidh
- Website: trollech.com

Trollech is a Czech band from Plzeň that plays black metal (Viking metal) music. The band was formed by Lord Morbivod and Asura Godwar Gorgon's Ray in 1999 and started performing live but did not release its first album until 2001. This album's genre has been labelled as "forest pagan black metal". The lyrics throughout are in Czech and apparently follow set themes revolving around the love of forests, trees, castles, trolls, dwarfs, weather (thunderstorms, rain) and other natural entities in the mystical realm of Trollech, of which the musicians act as guardians. The song "Ve Stinu Starych Dubu" became a hit among forest metalhead, and in the video even showed them hugging trees and protecting the forest.

Trollech's music is considered to be old-school pagan metal, especially their earlier albums. Their simple, yet melodic music provides support to the lyrics, the main quality of the band. Trollech uses Czech in a playful way, including frequent usage of archaic-sounding and unusual words.

== Band members ==
- Morbivod – guitar, screams
- Asura Godwar Gorgon's Ray – bass, shrieks, jaw harp
- Throllmas – guitar, vocals
- Sheafraidh – drums

=== Former members ===
- Johannes – guitar (2001–2006)

== Discography ==
Main releases

- Ve hvozdech... (2001)
- Synové lesů (2002)
- V rachotu hromů (2003)
- Skryti v mlze (2006)
- Jasmuz (2010)
- Vnitřní tma (2012)
- Každý strom má svůj stín (2017)

Live albums

- Svatoboj (Metal Swamp no. 22) (2006)

Compilation albums

- Ve hvozdech & Synové lesů (2010)

EPs

- Tváře stromů (2003)

Demos

- Dech pohanských větrů (1999)
