= Bluesquare =

Czech blues rock band

- Origin: Fulnek, Moravian-Silesian Region, Czech Republic
- Genres: Blues rock; blues; Southern rock; psychedelic rock
- Years active: 2007–present
- Labels: TTRec.
- Members: Štěpán Gruchala; René Gockert; Petr Hrubiš; Jiří Zelinka
- Website: bluesquareband.cz

Bluesquare are a Czech four-member blues rock band originating in Fulnek. Their music draws inspiration from blues, Southern rock, psychedelic rock, among others.

== History ==
Bluesquare formed in 2007 and consists of Štěpán "Cowboy" Gruchala (guitar, vocals), René "GOGO" Gockert (bass), Jiří "Zelí" Zelinka (drums), and Peťusek Hrubiš (saxophone). In 2010, they won the Zajíc music award as the best jazz/blues band in the Moravian-Silesian Region.

The band released their debut album, Sychravé ráno, in 2014.

== Band members ==
- Štěpán Gruchala – guitar, vocals
- René Gockert – bass
- Jiří Zelinka – drums
- Petr Hrubiš – saxophone

== Discography ==
- Sychravé ráno (2014)
