= Turbo (Czech band) =

Czech rock band

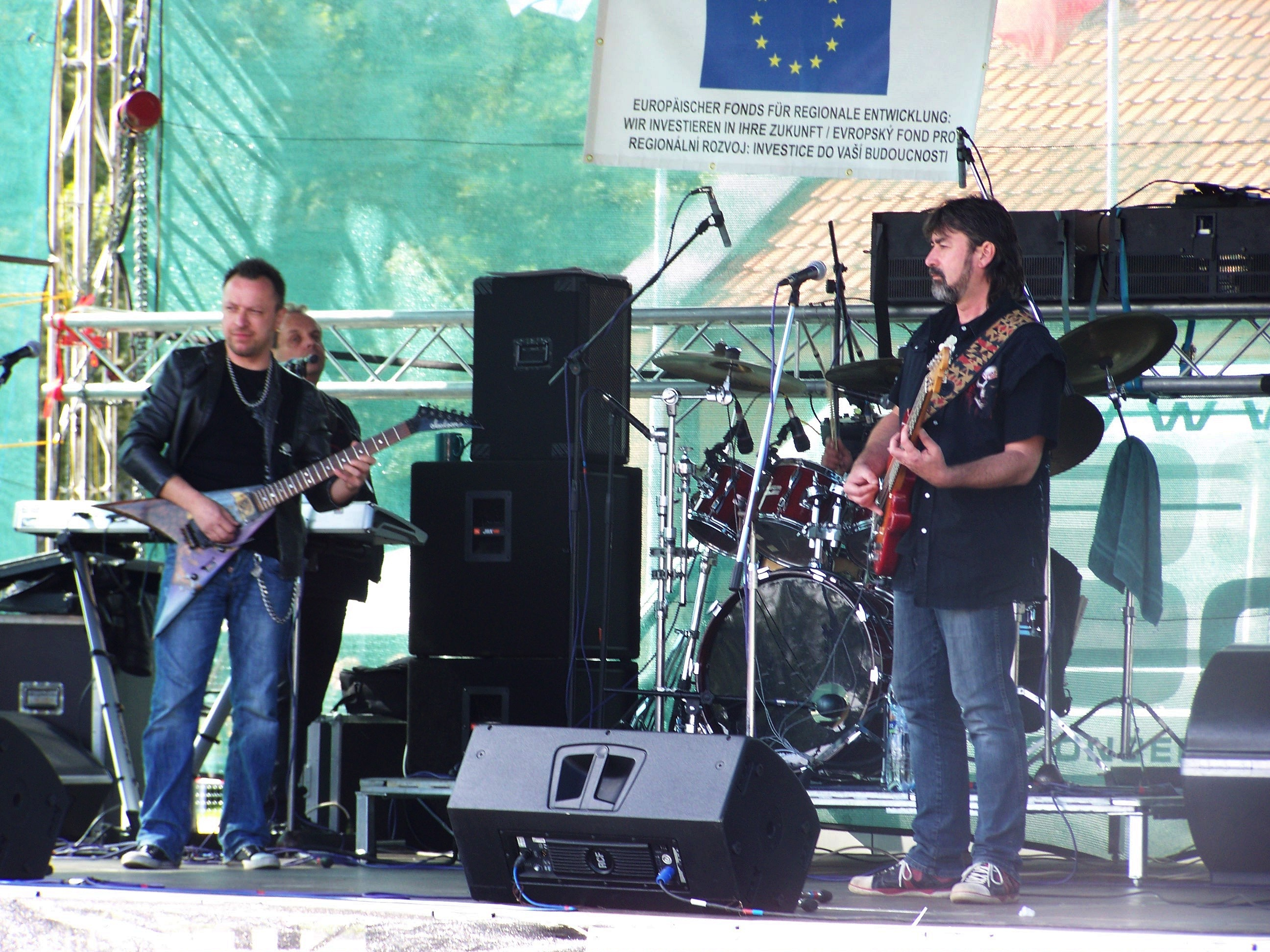
The band Turbo at the Aš Summer Festival 2010

Turbo is a Czech rock band founded in 1981, which has been described as "legends of Czech rock". Their most popular songs are: „Hráč“, „Chtěl jsem mít“, „Je to jízda“, „Krásným dívkám“, „Přestáváš snít“, „Láska z pasáží“.

== Members ==
=== Members in 2013 ===
- Mirek Chrástka
- Martin Laul
- Jirka Lang
- Petr „Bob“ Šťastný

=== Former members ===
- Richard Kybic
- Jiří Vondráček
- Jiří Lang
- Ladislav Rýdl
- Martin Laul
- Pavel Bady Zbořil
- Jiří "Bavr" Lokajíček
- Jaroslav Želínský
- Miloslav Orcígr

== Discography ==
=== Albums ===
- Turbo (1984)
- Heavy Waters (1985)
- To bude pánové jízda (1985)
- Hráč (1987)
- Turbo 88 (1988)
- Parta (1989)
- Jsou stále v nás (2001)
- Návrat králů (2005)

=== Singles ===
- Sedm dni / Divka s modryma ocima (1981)
- Tak co čekáš / Takhle se k výškám jde (1982)
- Přestáváš snít / Amore, při mě stůj (1982)
- Další ráno / Měsíc (1983)
- Díky, já jdu dál / Růžový kavalír (1983)
- Chtěl jsem mít / Tak jsem byl zase jednou druhej (1985)
- Hráč / Komu se nelení (1987)
- Vodopád prázdných slov / Navždy "Goodbye" (1988)
- Láska z pasáží / Sáro (1989)
- Kdo z nás je vinný / Andrománie (1989)
