= Yellow Sisters =

Czech female vocal quartet

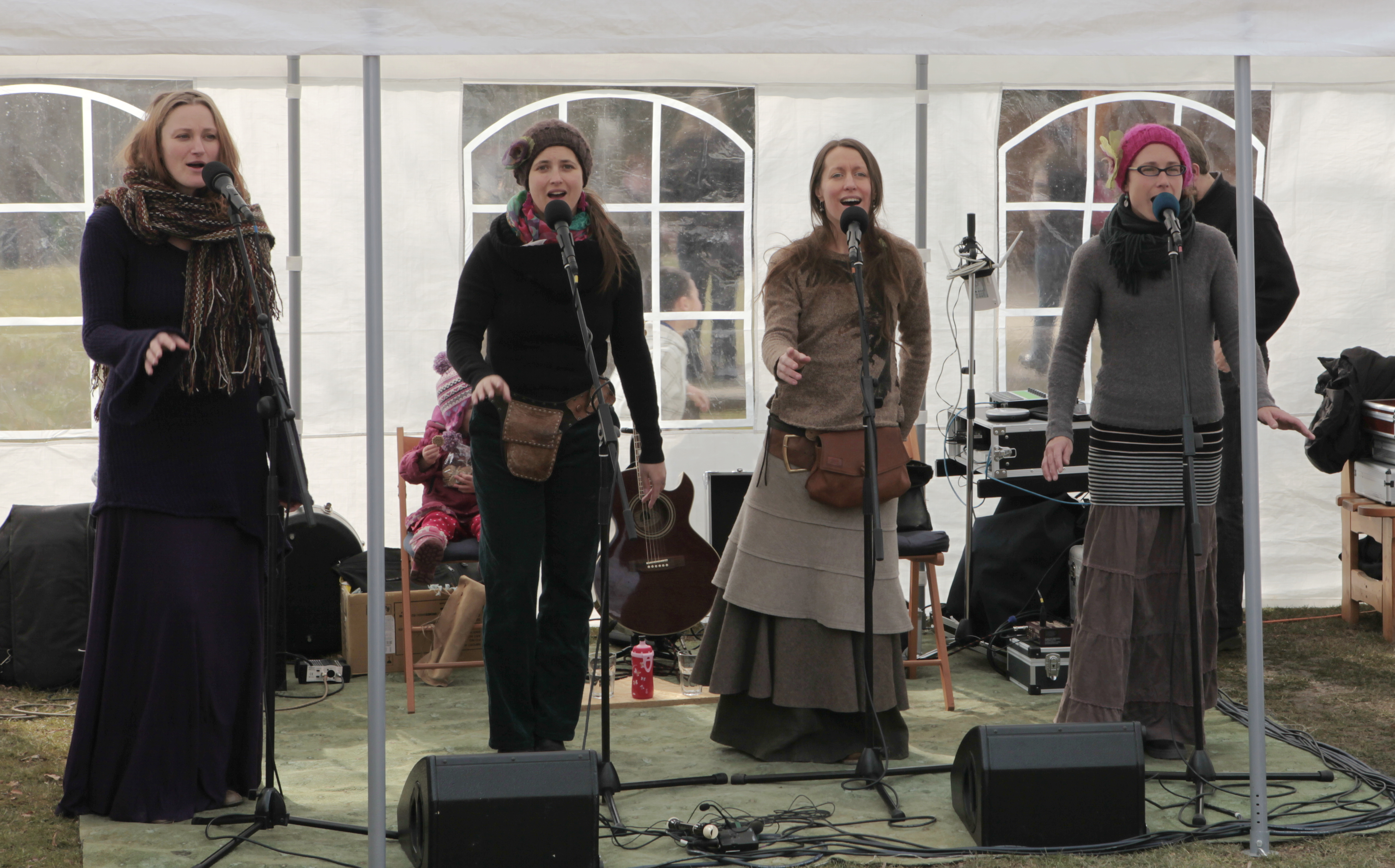
Yellow Sisters in Vlašimi, 2013

The Yellow Sisters are a Czech female vocal quartet, known for singing a cappella. Its members are Antonia Tereza Nyass, Barbora Vaculíková, Lucie Hawa Goldin and Léňa Yellow – Lenka Jankovská. Their singing is inspired by many musical styles and regions (from African traditional to American gospel, reggae, jazz or funk). They call themselves "sound illusionists" and their repertoire is purely self-composed. Their sound is quite experimental and playful, based on the rhythms of the Czech language.

They have been performing since 2005 – their first demo CD was produced in that year.

They are known for their strong support for human rights.

== Members ==
- Antonia Tereza Nyass
- Barbora Vaculíková
- Lucie Hawa Goldin
- Léňa Yellow – Lenka Jankovská

== Discography ==
- CD Demo Yellow Sisters 2005
- CD Singalana, Indies Records, 2006
- DVD Yellow Sisters Live at Retro Music Hall, Prague
- Tubab Woman – single, 2009
- CD Tubab Woman, Indies Scope, 2010
- CD Zvěřinec (Menagerie), Indies Scope, 2012
- CD 2013 REMIXED, 2013
- CD Yellow Sisters LIVE & Petr Wajsar (Club Kino Černošice), 2014
- CD Zvěřinec 2, Indies Scope, 2017
- Diva – single, 2018

== Links ==
- Official homepage
- Indies records portal
- Musicserver.cz
- FreeMusic – Polí5
