= Laura a její tygři =

Czech musical band

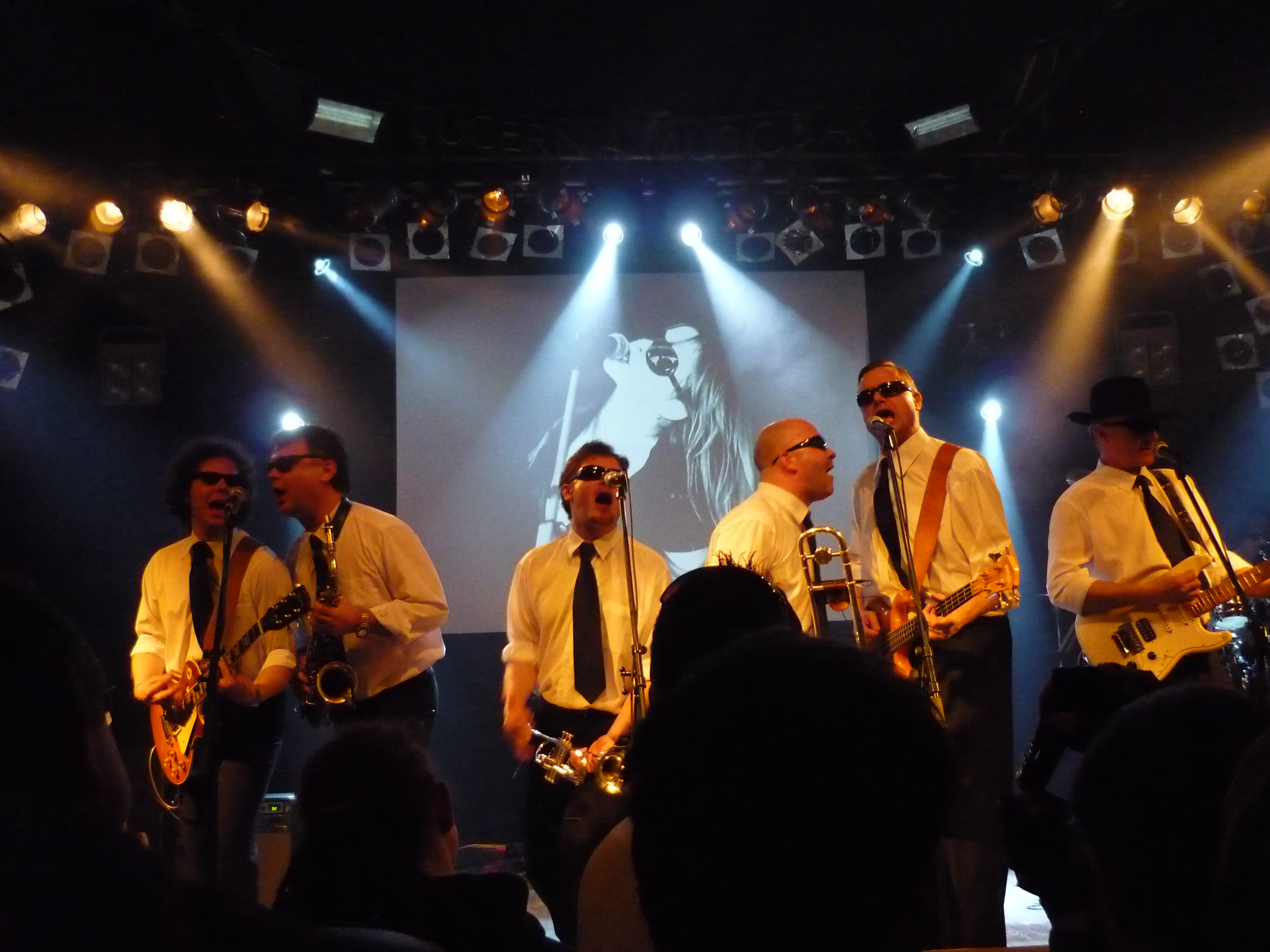
- Laura a její tygři performing in 2009

Background information
- Origin: Most, Czech Republic
- Genres: Funk; soul; jazz; rock
- Years active: 1985–present
- Labels: Bonton; EMI; Supraphon
- Members: Karel Šůcha; Lucie Bakešová; Miroslav Návrat; Kamil Jánský; Milan Král; Radek Němec; Ondřej Fišer; Tomislav Zvardoň
- Past members: See Band members section
- Website: lauranet.cz

Laura a její tygři is a Czech musical group founded in Most in 1985 by Karel Šůcha. They play funk, soul, jazz, and rock. As of 2023, the group has released ten studio albums and two compilations.

== Career ==
In 1985, Karel Šůcha founded the group in the northwestern Czech city of Most. The name, which in English means "Laura and her tigers", was inspired by the novel Tracy's Tiger, by American author William Saroyan. Since their founding, the band distinguished themselves by always wearing black pants, neckties, and sunglasses, and white dress shirts while performing. At present, the only remaining original member of Laura is Šůcha himself. Notable past members include singer Ilona Csáková.

== Band members ==
Current

- Karel Šůcha – vocals bass guitar
- Lucie Bakešová – vocals
- Miroslav Návrat – percussion
- Tomislav Zvardoň – guitar
- Kamil Janský – saxophone, vocals
- Milan Král – trombone, vocals
- Radek Němec – trumpet, vocals

Past

- Jana Amrichová
- Martin Pošta
- Ilona Csáková
- Daniel Nekonečný
- Miloš Vacík
- Ivan Myslikovjan
- Tereza Hálová
- Lenka Nová
- Vladěna Svobodová
- Jiří Ryvola
- Bohumil Vitásek
- Miroslav Saidl
- Roman Pašek
- Tomáš König
- Michal Rudolf
- Dan Masar
- Martin Miškovský
- Jaroslav Drápala
- Jiří Janouch

== Discography ==
Studio albums

- Žár trvá (1988)
- Nebudeme (1990)
- Síla v nás (1992)
- Rituál 199x (1995)
- Vyklátíme modly (1996)
- Rytmus (2001)
- Vyškrábu ti oči (2004)
- Nejsou malý věci (2009)
- Big Bang! (2011)
- Žár trvá / Továrna na sny (2016)

Compilations

- The Best Of (1994)
- Jsme tady! (2005)
