= The Desperate Mind =

Czech punk rock band

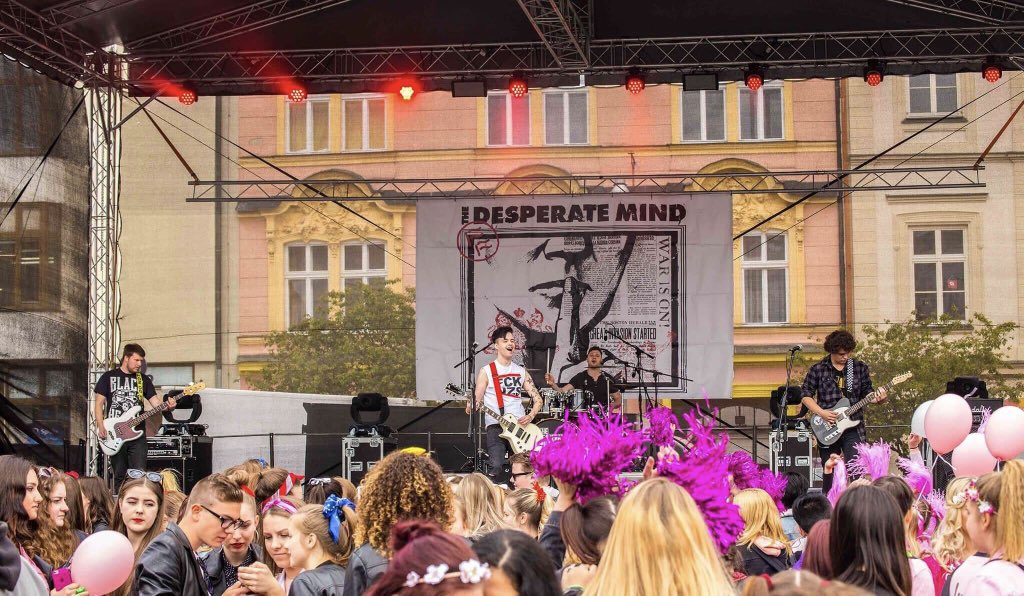
- The Desperate Mind in 2019

Background information
- Origin: Blansko, Czechia
- Genres: Post-hardcore; melodic hardcore; emo; punk rock (early)
- Years active: 2011–present
- Label: Independent
- Members: Martin J. Polák; Filip Buršík; Lucas Shishowski; Winc Janeček
- Past members: Tomáš Ondra; Dominik Zavadil; Dominik Kubík; David Havelka

The Desperate Mind is a Czech punk rock band from Blansko, formed in 2011. It consists of singer and rhythm guitarist Martin J. Polák, lead guitarist Filip Buršík, bassist Lucas Shishowski, and drummer Winc Janeček. Without being signed to any label, the band gained a significant following with their 2015 debut album, Amassed Sickness, and the following grew bigger with their 2016 release, an EP called False Flag. In 2024, they issued their third album, Scars.

== History ==
=== Early years (2011–13) ===
In 2011, two high school friends, Martin J. Polák and Tomáš Ondra, then aged 15 and 16, started the band under the name Green Talent, inspired by their two favorite bands, Green Day and Billy Talent. They began playing covers of various punk songs. At this time, they were joined by drummer Dominik Kubík, and as they began writing their own material, they changed their name to These Days, and shortly after to Dangers! With this lineup, they started playing small shows around their town, and in February 2013, they recorded a very short demo consisting of two songs, "Described in the Shadows" and "Drop Dead". This demo was never released and the songs were later re-recorded for their debut album.

=== The Desperate Mind and Symptoms of the Ignition EP (2014–15) ===
In late 2013 and early 2014, the band, still under the name Dangers!, began writing songs for their debut EP. In June 2014, they performed a set of five new songs at the charity festival You Dream, We Run, in their hometown of Blansko. Later that month, they were joined by Dominik Zavadil, who filled in the empty bass guitar spot, and the band changed their name for the final time to the Desperate Mind. In July 2014, they began planning a tour with Reservoar Dogz, a hard rock band from Brno. The tour, named To Hell and Back Tour 2014–2015, was set to launch in September 2014, starting in Brno and continuing in other major cities of the Czech Republic, until March 2015. The start of the tour was delayed by a month due to the departure of Kubík, who left because the tour time conflicted with his personal life. He was replaced by Winc Janeček in September 2014, and the tour kicked off on 4 October 2014. On 31 October 2014, the Desperate Mind entered the studio to record their debut EP, titled Symptoms of the Ignition, which came out on 2 November 2014 and consisted of three songs. The band spent the rest of the year on tour.

=== Brief hiatus and Amassed Sickness (2015) ===
After the end of the To Hell and Back Tour, in March 2015, the Desperate Mind went on a six-month hiatus to finish their graduation year in high school. In July, Polák announced via Facebook that the hiatus was over, and that the band would play a show in Prague on 5 August. After the show, the band have announced that they were entering the studio again, this time to record their debut full-length album, Amassed Sickness. The record, consisting of eleven songs (including re-recorded versions of the debut EP songs), came out on 15 September 2015 and was one of the best-rated debut albums of the year, with Punknews.org giving it a rating of 7/10 and Sputnikmusic giving it 4.5/5. In November 2015, the band parted ways with Dominik Zavadil, citing musical differences, and replaced him with David Havelka. They then played a few shows in support of their debut album from fall 2015 to mid-2016, with their first shows outside Czechia in 2016 in Austria and Germany.

=== False Flag EP and tour, "The Great Delusion" single and tour (2016–19) ===
In February 2016, the band members announced that they were working on new material via their social media accounts, with Polák stating that the band was changing their sound to "NOFX and Anti-Flag influenced melodic hardcore punk rock". In the summer of 2016, the Desperate Mind announced that they were recording a new EP, titled False Flag, which was released on 17 December 2016. The material saw the band move towards a more melodic hardcore punk rock sound, with the lyrics focusing on political and social issues. They teamed up with Pennsylvania-based artist Douglas Dean (who had previously designed the album art for Anti-Flag and Less Than Jake) for the album art. In January 2017, the band went on their first European tour, called "False Flag Tour 2017", starting in Cologne, Germany on 28 January and ending on 6 October in Prague. This tour saw them play their first bigger open-air festivals, such as Seefest in Stuttgart, Germany. The Desperate Mind also appeared in numerous magazines and music compilations, including Ox Fanzines Ox Compilation #131, with their song "The Syringe", and in the July issue of the biggest Czech music magazine, Rock&Pop. On 6 October 2017, the band finished the tour. In January 2018, Filip Buršík replaced Tomáš Ondra and the band began working on new material for their second studio album.

In February 2018, they announced that a new tour, titled "The Great Delusion 2018", would begin on 3 March 2018, with a double show in Brno with Booze & Glory and Death on Arrival.. On 19 August 2018, their new single "The Great Delusion" was released. In September 2018, the band announced that they would be filming a music video for "The Great Delusion". The filming started on 24 October 2018 and the music video was released on 19 December. On 29 December, Polák revealed that "The Great Delusion Tour" would continue into 2019. The 2019 part of the tour saw the band perform in the Czech Republic, Germany, and Slovakia, beginning on 5 January in Prague and ending on 22 November in Brno.

=== All Walls Will Fall (2020–2023) ===
On 17 April 2019, the Desperate Mind announced that they would be entering the recording studio to work on their second full-length album, titled All Walls Will Fall. Once again, the band teamed up with Douglas Dean, who designed the album and merchandise art. The record was released on 28 February 2020 and the band announced that a tour, titled 2020 All Walls Will Fall Tour, would begin on 14 March 2020. However, due to the COVID-19 pandemic, the tour was postponed to 12 June 2020. On 15 March 2021, in an interview with Canadian magazine Brutal Reality Digest, Polák confirmed that the band will resume their postponed European tour once COVID-19 restrictions are lifted, and that they are working on new material. On 29 March 2021, Martin J. Polák was interviewed by American music magazine Vinyl Writer, where he revealed that the next Desperate Mind record was going to be a concept album and would feature their new post-hardcore and melodic hardcore sound. On 5 June 2021, the band has resumed its postponed tour and announced a set of new tour dates for 2021 and beyond.

=== Scars, Acoustic (2024–present) ===
On 9 January 2024 the band announced the upcoming release of their third studio album, Scars, which came out on 31 May 2024.

On 6 November 2024, they announced the upcoming release of their third EP, Acoustic, featuring reimagined versions of songs from All Walls Will Fall and Scars, set to be released on 11 November 2024.

== Band members ==
Current members

- Martin J. Polák – lead vocals, rhythm guitar (2011–present)
- Filip Buršík – lead guitar, backing vocals (2018–present)
- Lucas Shishowski – bass guitar (2024–present)
- Winc Janeček – drums, backing vocals (2014–present)

Former members

- Dominik Kubík – drums (2011–2014)
- Dominik Zavadil – bass guitar (2014–2015)
- Tomáš Ondra – lead guitar (2011–2018)
- David Havelka – bass guitar (2015–2024)

== Discography ==
Studio albums

- Amassed Sickness (2015)
- Amassed Sickness – Record Store Day Edition (2016)
- All Walls Will Fall (2020)
- Scars (2024)

EPs

- Symptoms of the Ignition (2014)
- False Flag (2016)
- Acoustic (2024)

Singles

- "Andy's Diary (2017 Re-Recorded Version)" (2017)
- "The Great Delusion" (2018)

Demos

- Described in the Shadows/Drop Dead (2013, Unreleased)

Compilation appearances

- Ox Compilation #131 (Various Punk/HC/Ska Artists) – The Syringe (2017)
