= Škwor =

Czech metal band

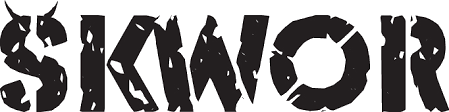
- Band logo

Background information
- Also known as: Skwar
- Origin: Prague, Czech Republic
- Genres: Heavy metal; nu metal; alternative metal; hard rock; thrash metal
- Years active: 1998–present
- Labels: Warner
- Members: Petr Hrdlička; Martin Pelc; Tomáš Kmec; Jan Chudan
- Past members: Leo Holan; František Vadlejch; Herr Miler; Martin Volák
- Website: skwor.cz

Škwor (stylized as ŠkWor) is a Czech rock and heavy metal band from Prague, formed in 1998. It consists of Petr Hrdlička (vocals, guitar), Tomáš Kmec (bass), Martin Pelc (drums), and Jan Chudan (guitar). As of 2026, the band has released eleven studio albums, one compilation, and two live albums. They are known for their crude, often vulgar lyrics in which they critique society, denounce social inequality, criticize the police, and promote traditional gender roles.

== History ==
In 1998, Petr Hrdlička (vocals, guitar), Tomáš Kmec (bass), and František Vadlejch (drums) formed the thrash metal/punk band Skwar, with guitarist Leo Holan joining soon after. They released their debut album, Mayday, in 2000. Vadlejch left in 2001 and was replaced by Herr Miler (Debustrol). The same year, the band changed their name to ŠkWor (a play on the word "škvor", meaning "earworm" or "earwig") and released the album Vyhlašuju boj!, whose style was a departure from their debut and was compared to nu metal bands such as Linkin Park and Clawfinger.

In 2004, ŠkWor issued their third studio record, Vyvolenej, which was their breakthrough in Czechia. It sold over 10,000 copies and was certified gold. The album was followed a year later by Amerika, which they promoted with their first headlining tour. 2007 saw the release of Loutky and in 2008, they published 5. A year later, the band released their first compilation album, Sečteno podtrženo. Their next studio record, titled Drsnej kraj, came out in 2011.

In 2012, ŠkWor released their first official DVD, titled Natvrdo, which also included a bonus live CD and backstage footage. Their eighth studio album, Sliby & lži, came out in 2013. That year, the band celebrated their 15th anniversary with a concert at Prague's Incheba arena, a DVD/CD live recording of which was released a year later under the title 15 let – Praha Incheba arena.

In 2015, the band published their ninth studio album, Hledání IDentity. In 2017, they announced the departure of longtime guitarist Leo Holan, who was subsequently replaced by Martin Volák (Debustrol, Harlej). The same year, the band issued the album Uzavřenej kruh. A year later, they celebrated their twentieth anniversary with a concert at Prague's O2 Arena. In 2020, the album Tváře smutnejch hrdinů came out.

In 2022, guitarist Martin Volák left Škwor and was replaced by Jan Chudan. A year later, the band celebrated their 25th anniversary with a concert at the O2 Universum convention centre in Prague. Their next album, titled Sobě věrnej, was released in 2023. As part of the record's promotional tour, the band announced three shows at O2 Universum in December 2024.

== Band members ==
Current

- Petr Hrdlička – vocals, guitar (1998–present)
- Tomáš Kmec – bass (1998–present)
- Martin Pelc – drums (2001–present)
- Jan Chudan – guitar (2022–present)

Past

- František Vadlejch – drums (1998–2001)
- Herr Miler – drums (2001)
- Leo Holan – guitar (1998–2017)
- Martin Volák – guitar (2017–2022)

== Discography ==
Studio albums

- Mayday (as Skwar, 2000)
- Vyhlašuju boj! (2001)
- Vyvolenej (2004)
- Amerika (2005)
- Loutky (2007)
- 5 (2008)
- Drsnej kraj (2011)
- Sliby & lži (2013)
- Hledání IDentity (2015)
- Uzavřenej kruh (2017)
- Tváře smutnejch hrdinů (2020)
- Sobě věrnej (2023)

Compilations

- Sečteno podtrženo – The Best of (2009)

Live albums

- Natvrdo (2012)
- 15 let – Praha Incheba arena (2014)
