= Naše Věc =

Czech hip hop band

- Genres: Hip hop
- Years active: 1997–2006
- Past members: Dup X; Scissal; Plgál; Číňan; Kaluža; Psicho; 2Jay; Apoka; Drone; DJ Opia
- Website: nasevec.cz

Naše Věc was a Czech hip hop band from Brno, active between 1997 and 2006. They released two studio albums and several demos.

== History ==
Naše Věc was formed in Brno in 1997 by Dup X, Scissal, Plgál, and Číňan. A year later, the latter two had left, and Dup X and Scissal began work on a demo with Kaluža, a young female MC. After she also departed the group, in 1999, Naše Věc saw several lineup changes, with members including Psicho, 2Jay, Apoka, Drone, and DJ Opia. They released their debut studio album, titled Blázni jsou ti..., in 2001, and followed it with Hořký menu in 2003. The group split up in 2006.

== Discography ==
Demos

- Demo (1997)
- Demoapůl (1998)
- Trust No One (1998)

Studio albums

- Blázni jsou ti...' (2001)
- Hořký menu' (2003)
