= Visací zámek =

Czech punk rock band

- Origin: Prague, Czech Republic
- Genres: Punk rock
- Years active: 1982–present
- Members: Jan Haubert; Michal Pixa; Ivan Rut; Vladimír Šťástka; Jiří Pátek
- Website: Official website

Visací zámek (English: Padlock) is a Czech punk-rock band. Formed by five students at the Czech Technical University in Prague in 1982, the band has a line-up which has remained unchanged for over 41 years.

== History ==
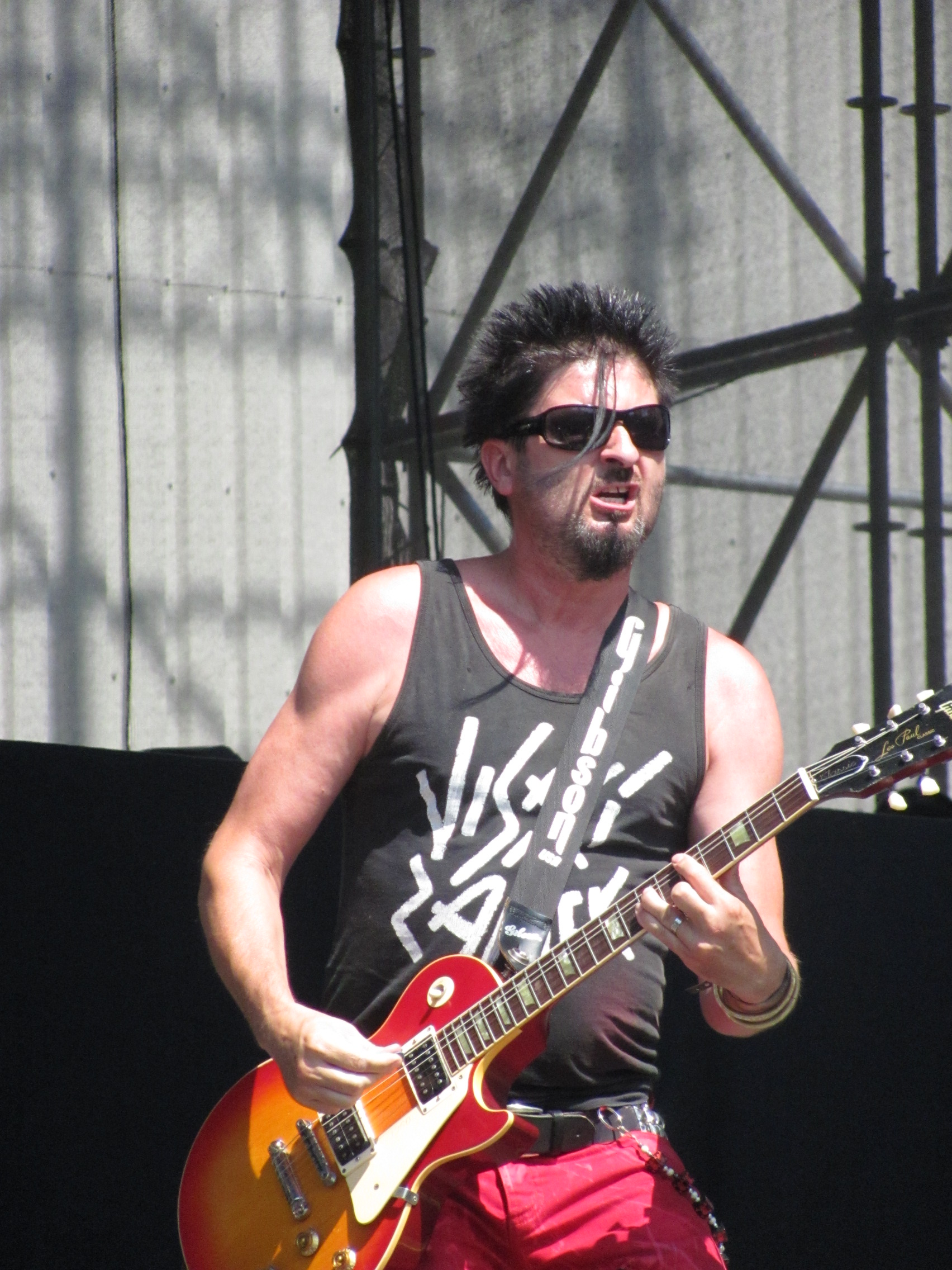
Michal Pixa

The members of the band met as students studying civil engineering at the Czech Technical University in Prague. Upon forming the band, their plan was to perform one gig only for other students, which took place on 7 December 1982 in a student club, 007. However, they decided to continue as a band. They sold out a concert at Chmelnice club. However, their music did not correspond to the communist authorities' conception of official art, and the band changed its name to Traktor, named after one of their biggest hits, to avoid possible problems. However, some members of the band were called up to complete compulsory military service. Pixa, Šťástka and Pátek were placed in the same army unit and formed a new band called Sedum vostrejch. The remaining band members joined other bands (e.g. Plexis) and later played in a different lineup as V.Z. (V zastoupení - on behalf of).

The original lineup reformed in 1987. In 1988 they released their first single (under the name V.Z.) and in 1990 recorded their first, self-titled, album. In 1992, film director Petr Zelenka made a mockumentary about the band entitled Visací zámek 1982 - 2007. Most of their original material was released during the first half of the 1990s with one album recorded every year. In the second half of the 1990s, the band reduced their songwriting activities and focused mainly on touring, also releasing several live recordings. However, this approach reduced the band's profile in the mainstream media. In 2005 their music video Známka punku became successful and revived their popularity. After this success, Jan Haubert began publishing books of poetry that he used to recite during their concerts. The band continues to tour and occasionally releases new material.

== Members ==
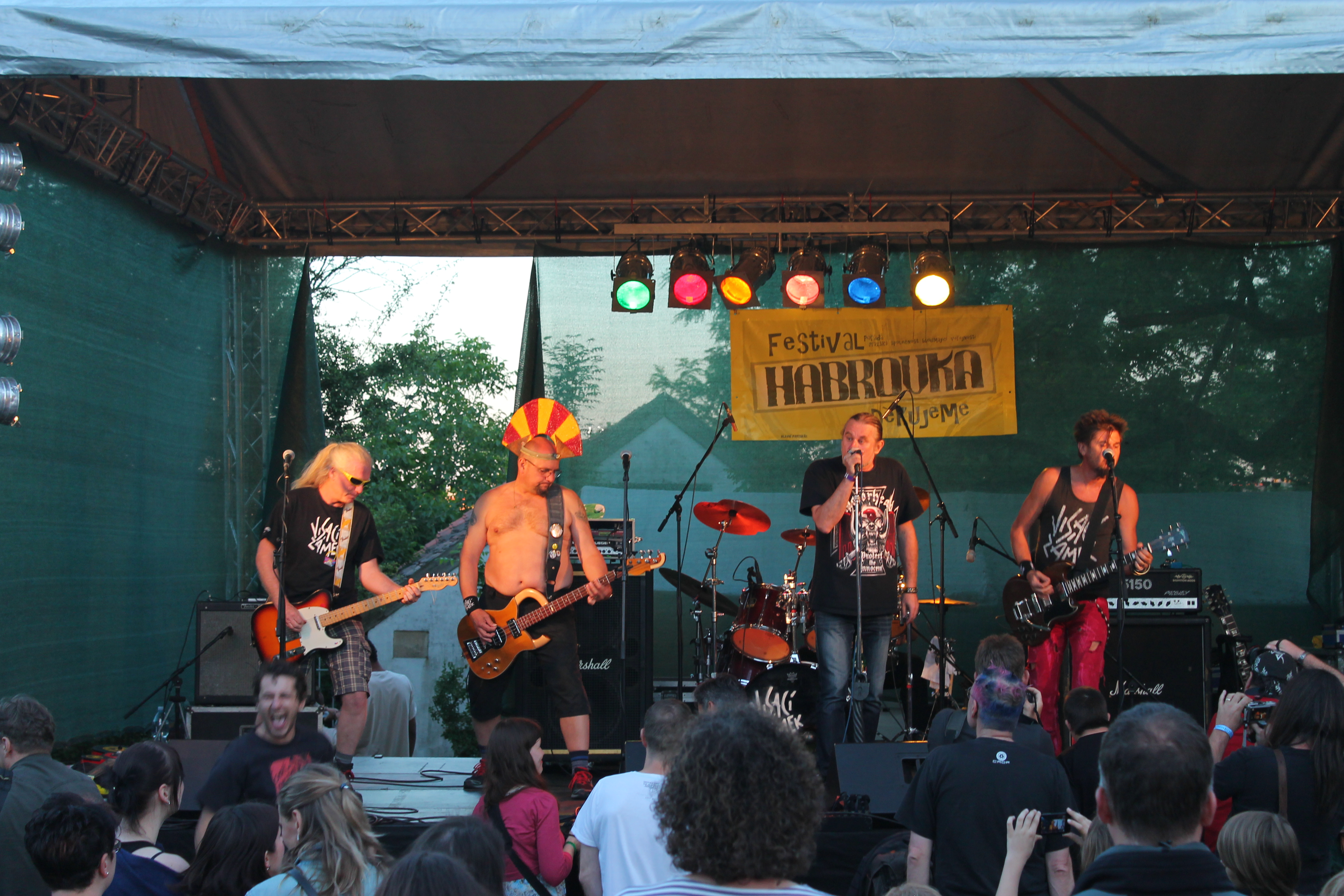
Visací zámek in 2014. From left: Ivan Rut, Vladimír Šťástka, Jan Haubert, Michal Pixa

- Jan "Hony" Haubert – lead vocals
- Michal "Pixies" Pixa – guitar, backing vocals
- Vladimír "Savec" Šťástka – bass guitar, backing vocals
- Ivan "Hroch" Rut – guitar, backing vocals
- Jiří "Sweet P" Pátek – drums

== Discography ==
- Visací zámek (1990)
- Start 02 (1991)
- Three Locks (1992)
- Traktor (1993)
- Jako vždycky (1994)
- Sex (1996)
- Visací zámek znovu zasahuje (2000)
- Punk! (2005)
- Klasika (2010)
- Punkový království (2015)
- Anarchie a Total Chaos (2020)
