= Žlutý pes =

Czech rock band

- Also known as: Tomahawk; Hudebně-zábavná skupina Ondřeje Hejmy
- Origin: Prague, Czechoslovakia
- Genres: Boogie rock; blues rock; southern rock
- Years active: 1978—present
- Members: Ondřej Hejma; Jan Martínek; Petr Roškaňuk; Richard Böhm; Kateřina Pelíšková; Jiří Plech Novotný; Richard Dvořák
- Past members: Zdeněk Juračka; Jiří Hrubeš; Eduard Kuhn; Jiří Zelenka; Hugo Kohl; Antonín Smrčka; František Kotva

Žlutý pes is a Czech rock band active since 1978. Its founder and frontman, Ondřej Hejma, is also the band's primary songwriter. They have sometimes performed under the pseudonyms "Tomahawk" and "Hudebně-zábavná skupina Ondřeje Hejmy" in the past. Žlutý pes have recorded more than a dozen albums and scored a number of radio hits.

== History ==
Ondřej Hejma came up with the idea of forming a band in 1978 while visiting a friend in Los Angeles. When he returned to Czechoslovakia, he invited a number of musician friends to join him, and Žlutý pes was born. They began to play at bars and slowly gained a following. In the 1980s, after the publication of the Tribuna article "Nová vlna se starým obsahem" (New Wave with Old Content) about up-and-coming Prague bands, Žlutý pes began to be noticed by music critics and listeners alike. This didn't last long, however, and in 1984, the band went on hiatus due to a lack of interest among fans. In 1986, Hejma was approached by the record label Artia with the offer of a publishing deal, if he gave them an album sung entirely in English, targeting international audiences. At the time, Hejma worked as a freelance interpreter and translator, so his command of the language was good. The label wanted the record to be released under Hejma's name only, however, so the album, titled Rockin' the Blues, which came out in 1987, was attributed solely to their lead singer, even though the entire band was present, as well as various guest musicians such as David Koller, Vladimír Tesařík, and Emil Viklický.

In 1988, Žlutý pes were officially back together and they released their debut album under the title Ondřej Hejma – Žlutý pes. This was followed by Hoši z východního bloku in 1992, with guest vocals from Karel Gott and Lucie Bílá. The band's next album, 1994's Yellow Dog, was a commercial success, and it received Gold certification. Šala-hů, Blbej den and Trsátko were released in 1996, the year that Žlutý pes won the Czech Music Academy Award as Band of the Year. Poslední lžíce and Himálaje followed in 1998 and 1999, respectively. Their latest album, titled Stroj času, came out in 2014.

== Band members ==
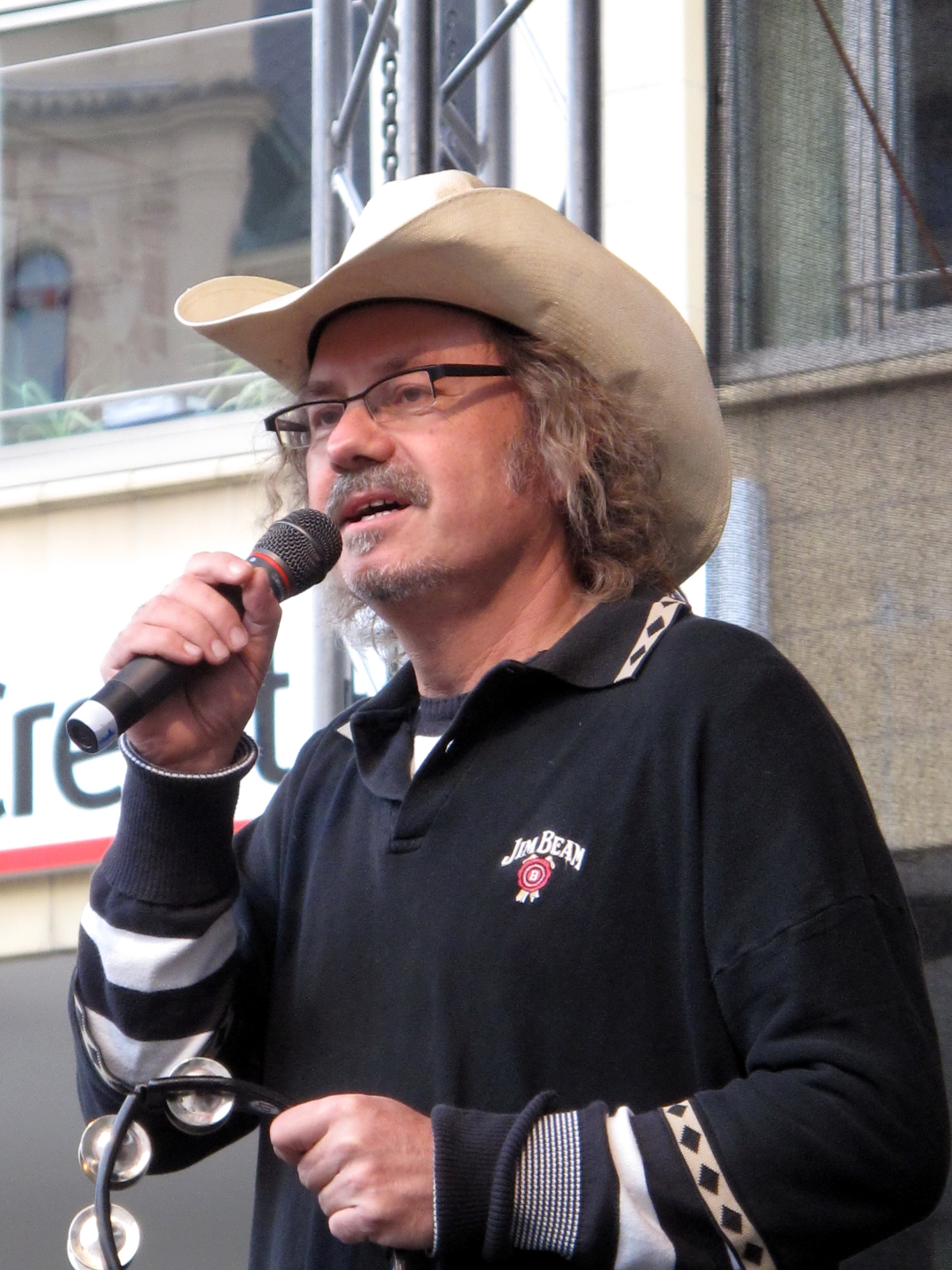
Ondřej Hejma in 2009

Current

- Ondřej Hejma – vocals
- Jan Martínek – guitar
- Petr Roškaňuk – guitar
- Kateřina Pelíšková – guitar
- Jiří Plech Novotný – bass
- Richard Böhm – drums
- Richard Dvořák – keyboards

Previous

- Zdeněk Juračka – guitar
- Jiří Hrubeš – drums
- Eduard Kuhn – saxophone
- Jiří Zelenka – saxophone
- Hugo Kohl – guitar
- Antonín Smrčka – bass
- František Kotva – guitar

== Discography ==
- Rockin' the Blues (credited to Ondřej Hejma)
- Ondřej Hejma – Žlutý pes (1988)
- Hoši z východního bloku (1992)
- Yellow Dog (1994)
- Šala-hů, Blbej den (1996)
- Trsátko (1996)
- Poslední lžíce (1998)
- Himálaje (1999)
- Fotbalová (2000)
- Čínská otázka (2001)
- Psí kusy (ty nejlepší kousky) (compilation album, 2002)
- Rok psa (2006)
- Mellow Yellow (2008)
- Modrá je dobrá (2011)
- Stroj času (2014)
