= Wohnout =

Czech rock band

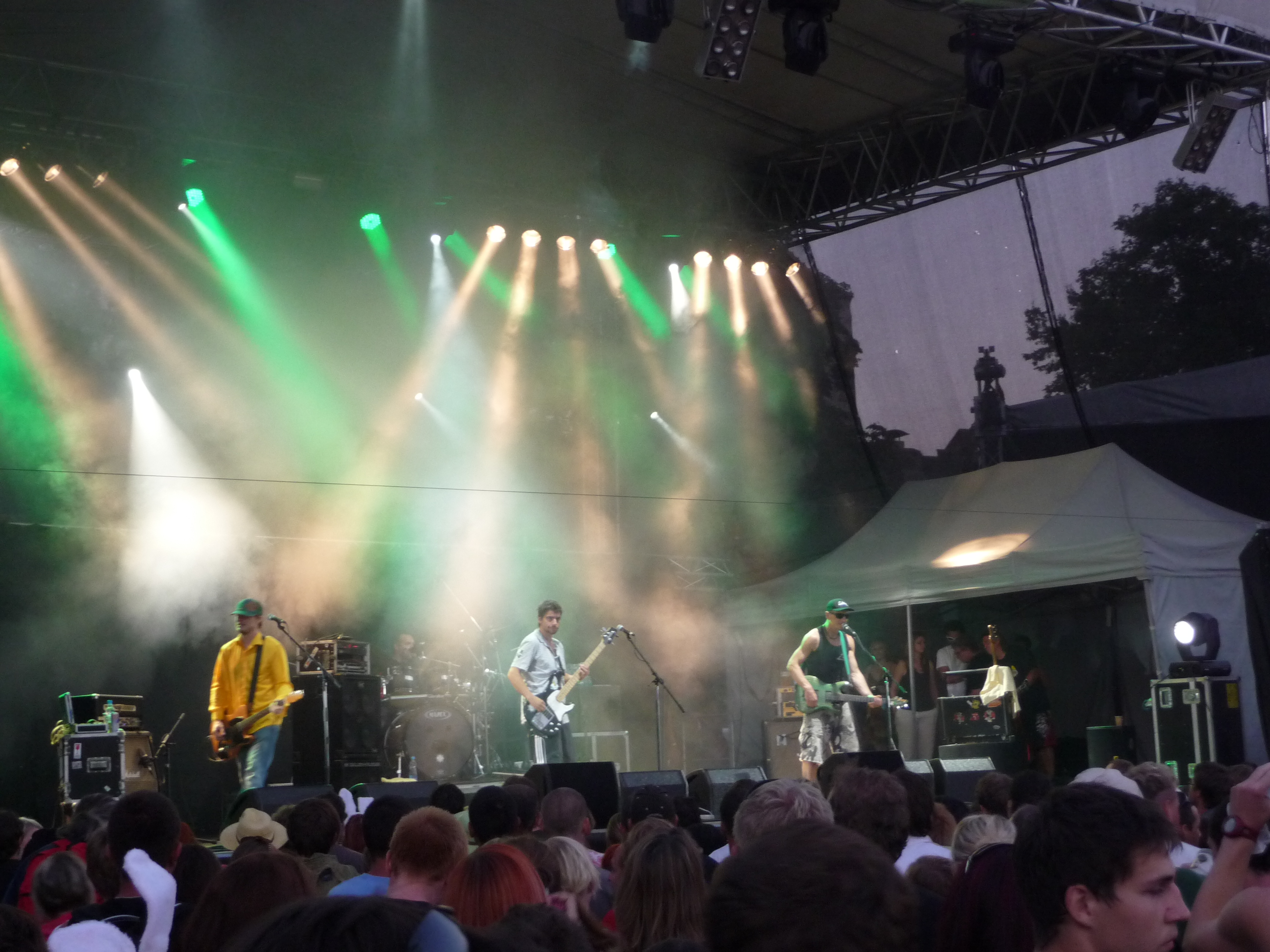

Background information
- Origin: Prague, Czech Republic
- Genres: Punk rock, alternative rock funk rock
- Years active: 1988–1990, 1995 onward
- Labels: Sony BMG
- Members: Matěj Homola; Jan Homola; Zdeněk Steiner; Jiří Zemánek
- Website: wohnout.cz

Wohnout is a Czech alternative rock band formed in Prague in 1988. The group comprises guitarists/vocalists Matěj Homola and Jan Homola, bassist Jiří Zemánek and drummer Zdeněk Steiner. Wohnout is among the most popular bands in the Czech Republic and released ten studio albums since formation.

== History ==
Wohnout was formed in Prague in 1988, one year prior to the Velvet Revolution. The lineup consisted of brothers Matěj Homola and Jan Homola, both on guitars and vocals, along with a bassist and a drummer. In 1990, however, Wohnout disbanded.

Brothers Homola reformed in 1995 with new bassist Jiří Zemánek (born Zeman) and a new drummer Zdeněk Steiner. Their first show was in 1996, and their debut album, Cundalla, was recorded in 1998 and released in 1999 by Sony Music/Bonton. Wohnout's popularity started to rise after the release of 2001's Zlý noty na večeři. This album hinted their typical melodic rock style.

The next album Pedro se vrací was released in 2002 and Rande s panem Bendou in 2004. Wohnout became one of the main rock bands in Czech Republic, and went on several tours Czech Republic and music festivals in Europe. They also recorded music videos. In 2006 Wohnout released Polib si dědu (special guest for the song "Činely" was Finnish band Waltari) and in 2007 was Ahoj Dědo Tour. In March 2009, the band released a new album Karton veverek.

== Members ==
- Matěj Homola – lead & rhythm guitars, vocals
- Jan Homola – lead & rhythm guitars, vocals
- Jiří Zemánek – bass guitar
- Zdeněk Steiner – drums

== Discography ==
Studio albums

- Cundalla (1999)
- Zlý noty na večeři (2001)
- Pedro se vrací (2002)
- Rande s panem Bendou (2004)
- Polib si Dědu (2006)
- Karton Veverek (2009)
- Našim klientům (2011)
- Laskonky a kremrole (2014)
- Miss maringotka (2018)
- HUH! (2021)

Compilations

- Nevydáno (2005) (rare and unreleased songs)
