= Support Lesbiens =

Czech rock band

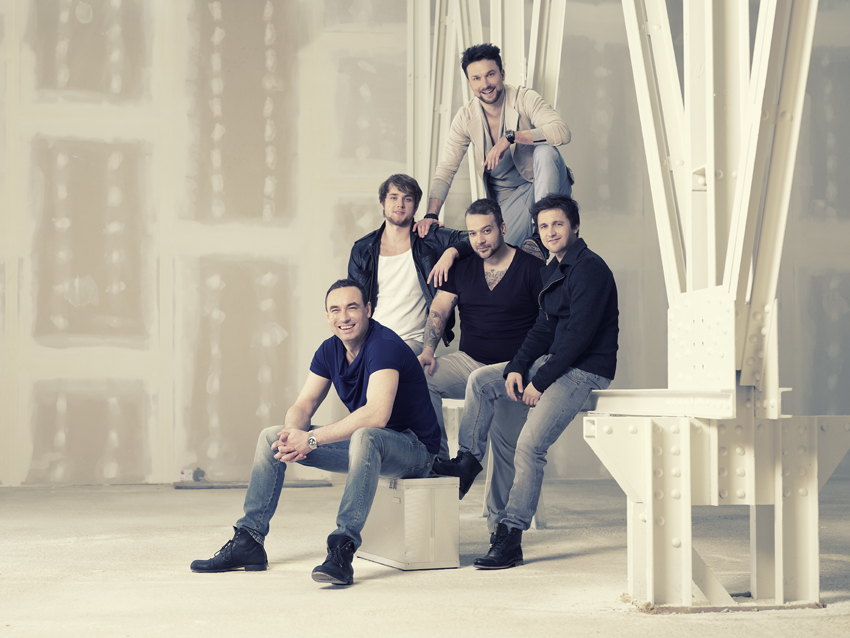
- Support Lesbiens, 2013

Background information
- Origin: Prague, Czech Republic
- Genres: Rock; pop rock
- Years active: 1992–present
- Members: Czenda Urbánek; Hynek Toman; Jan Andr; Radek Tomášek; Filip Fendrych
- Past members: Kryštof Michal
- Website: supportlesbiens.cz

Support Lesbiens is a Czech musical group from Prague. It was founded in 1992. Their single "Cliché" was the first single by a Czech English-singing group to reach number one in an official radio chart IFPI.

== Musical career ==
Support Lesbiens experienced a tough start in the Czech musical scene due to a general skepticism against Czech bands singing in English. The breakthrough came with the third album Regeneration?, further solidified with the fourth album Tune Da Radio certified platinum in Czechia (15 000 sold records).

In 2003, the band's lead guitarist and writer Jaromír Helešic left the band. In 2013, the band released a new single Changes, followed by the album Leave A Message.

== Band members ==
Current members

- Dušan Marko - vocals
- Hynek Toman - guitar
- Jan Andr - keyboards
- Filip Fendrych - bass
- Radek Tomášek - drums

Past members

- Josef Czenda Urbánek - vocals
- Kryštof Michal - vocals

== Discography ==
- So, What? (1993)
- Medicine Man (1994)
- Regeneration? (2001)
- Tune Da Radio (2002)
- Midlife (2004)
- Euphony and Other Adventures (2006)
- Greatest Hits 1993-2007 (2007)
- Lick It (2008)
- Soft Collection (2009)
- Homobot (2011)
- Changes (2013) - new band members
- K.I.D. (2015)
- Glow (2018)
