= The Prostitutes =

Czech rock band

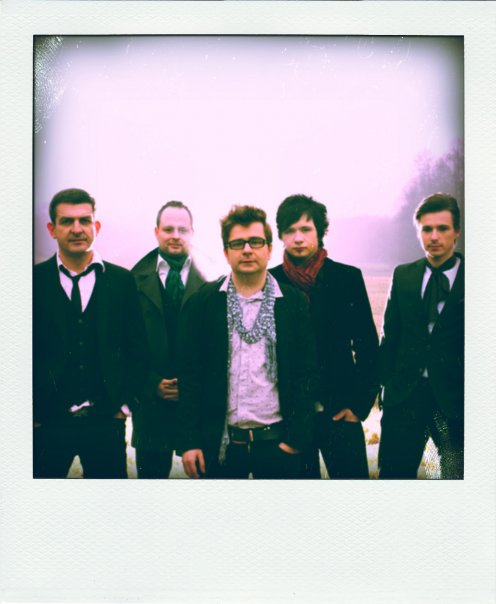
- The Prostitutes in 2009; L–R: Adrian T. Bell, Stevie LFO, Martin Destroyer, Adam Piaf, Luk Santiago

Background information
- Origin: Prague, Czechia
- Genres: Indie rock; post-punk
- Years active: 2004–present
- Labels: Pale Music International; Championship Records; p
- Members: Adrian T. Bell; Martin Destroyer; Stevie LFO; Luk Santiago; Vegy; eLTea
- Past members: Mark Jukebox; Šmity; Adam Piaf; Tuzex
- Website: theprostitutes.org

The Prostitutes is a Czech indie rock band formed in 2004 in Prague. It consists of Adrian T. Bell (vocals), Martin "Destroyer" Přikryl (guitar), Martin "Stevie LFO" Převrátil (keyboards), Lukáš "Luk Santiago" Přikryl (drums), Jan "Vegy" Táborský (guitar), and Ladislav "eLTea" Tobiášek (bass). They have released five studio albums, one EP, and a live record.

== History ==
The Prostitutes was formed in 2004 in Prague, Czechia, by vocalist Adrian T. Bell, guitarist Martin "Destroyer" Přikryl, keyboardist Martin "Stevie LFO" Převrátil, bass guitarist Marek "Mark Jukebox" Dziuba, and drummer Lukáš "Luk Santiago" Přikryl. They released their debut, self-titled EP in 2005, and the full-length album Get Me Out of Here followed in September 2006. Mark Jukebox left in December of that year and was replaced by Martin "Šmity" Chmátal.

The Prostitutes issued their second album, Hometown Zombies, in 2009, and Šmity left the same year. He was replaced by Adam Piaf. The band released the live record One Two Three Four in 2011 and two more studio albums, before splitting up in 2017. They regrouped in 2024, with new bassist Ladislav "eLTea" Tobiášek. In 2025, they issued the album Inevitably Delayed, which received positive reviews from critics.

In February 2026, the Prostitutes were nominated in the Group of the Year category at the Anděl Awards.

== Band members ==
Current

- Adrian T. Bell – vocals (2004–present)
- Martin "Destroyer" Přikryl – guitar (2004–present)
- Martin "Stevie LFO" Převrátil – keyboards (2004–present)
- Lukáš "Luk Santiago" Přikryl – drums (2004–present)
- Jan "Vegy" Táborský – guitar (2016–present)
- Ladislav "eLTea" Tobiášek – bass (2024–present)

Past

- Marek "Mark Jukebox" Dziuba – bass (2004–2006)
- Šmity – bass (2006–2009)
- Adam Piaf – bass (2009–2015)
- Tuzex – bass (2015–2016)

== Discography ==
- The Prostitutes (EP, 2005)
- Get Me Out of Here (2006)
- Hometown Zombies (2009)
- One Two Three Four (live, 2011)
- Deaf to the Call (2012)
- Zum Passer (2015)
- Inevitably Delayed (2025)
