= Colours of Ostrava =

Annual international music festival in Czechia

Coordinates: 49°49′50″N 18°18′0″E

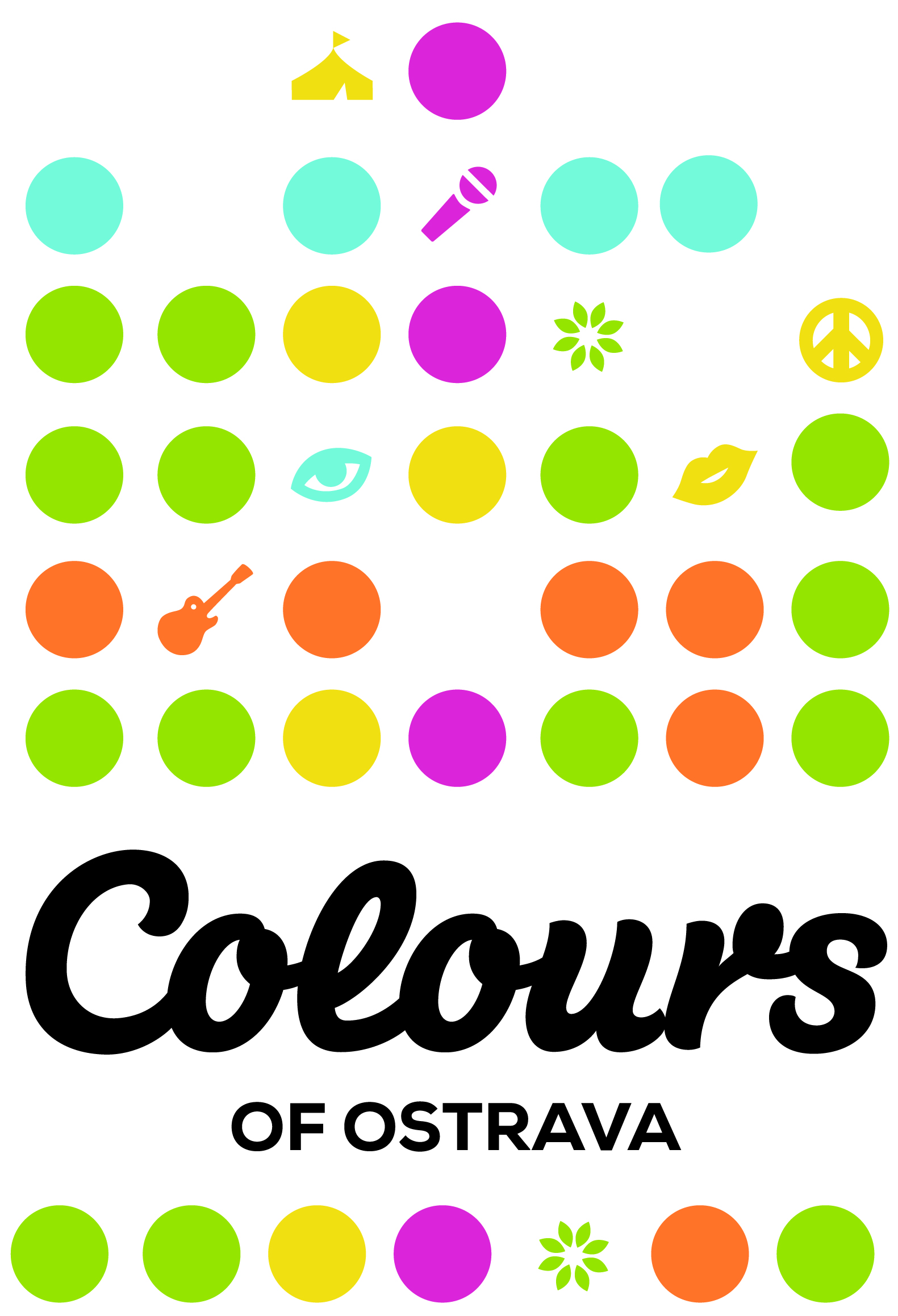
- Genre: Various
- Dates: Second or third weekend in July (4 days)
- Locations: Ostrava, Czechia
- Years active: 2002–present
- Founders: Zlata Holušová
- Website: colours.cz

Colours of Ostrava, or simply Colours, a multi-genre event, is the biggest international music festival in Czechia and one of the largest in Central Europe, held every summer since 2002 in Ostrava, the third largest city in the country. Colours features 16 stages, including 4 big open-air stages (the main one with a capacity of 15,000), 6 indoor stages, a theatre stage, a workshop stage, a kids' stage, a cinema, and live discussions. It features performers from all major popular music genres as well as avant-garde music and world music.

== Background ==
Until 2012, Colours took place in the Silesian Ostrava Castle entertainment district and on the Černá louka fairgrounds, as well as at other places in the city centre. Since 2012, the festival takes place on recultivated brownfields in the Vítkovice city district.

Since 2016, the event has taken place concurrently with the international discussion forum Meltingpot.

2017 was the first year that all tickets to Colours were sold out.

== COVID-19 pandemic ==
In 2020, while the event was cancelled due to the COVID-19 pandemic, a four-day, indoor event was organized on the festival grounds, with a limited capacity of 1,000 attendees, titled NeFestival. It included performances by the Czech bands Tata Bojs and Voxel. The Bosnian rock group Dubioza kolektiv was also slated to perform, but due to restrictions on international travel, they were unable to attend. NeFestival was called off after only two days, as restrictions on gatherings were tightened by the local government.

Colours of Ostrava did not take place in 2021, again for reasons related to the ongoing pandemic.

== Awards and recognition ==
Among other awards, in 2005 and 2006, Colours won the Musical Event of the Year prize at the Anděl Awards. In 2016, The Guardian ranked it among the top ten music festivals in Europe.

== Transportation ==
Due to the popularity of Colours and the electronic music festival Beats for Love, both of which take place in Ostrava in July, several trains are added to regular rail schedules by České dráhy.

== Controversy ==
In 2023, visitors were denied entry by security if they wore rainbow-colored articles of clothing. In a recording, security personnel referred to the festival's official policy of prohibiting the propagation of ideology and likened the LGBT flag to the Hakenkreuz—a Nazi symbol.

== Partial lineups, by year ==
- 2002: Monkey Business, Kryštof, Buty, Tata Bojs, Floex, and Oldřich Janota
- 2003: Goran Bregović, Geoffrey Oryema, Kosheen, Support Lesbiens, The Ecstasy of Saint Theresa, Te Vaka, Kryštof, and Divokej Bill
- 2004: Natacha Atlas, Bob Geldof, Rachid Taha, Zion Train, Oysterband, Urban Trad, Elliott Murphy, Monkey Business, Tata Bojs, and Buty
- 2005: George Clinton with Parliament/Funkadelic featuring Bernie Worrell, Asian Dub Foundation, Alabama 3, Fun-Da-Mental, Transglobal Underground, Mariza, Daara J, Septeto Nacional, Kryštof, The Klezmatics, Dan Bárta, Monkey Business, and Čechomor
- 2006: Salif Keita, Robert Plant & Strange Sensation, Gogol Bordello, The Frames, Delirious?, Woven Hand, Cheikh Lo, Zakopower, Stephan Micus, Monkey Business, Chinaski, and Lenka Dusilová
- 2007: Marianne Faithfull, Mando Diao, Bajofondo Tango Club, Gipsy Kings, Coldcut, Yungchen Lhamo, Vinicio Capossela, Orange Blossom, The Idan Raichel Project, Goran Bregović, Richard Bona, Balkan Beat Box, Djivan Gasparyan, Salsa Celtica, and CocoRosie

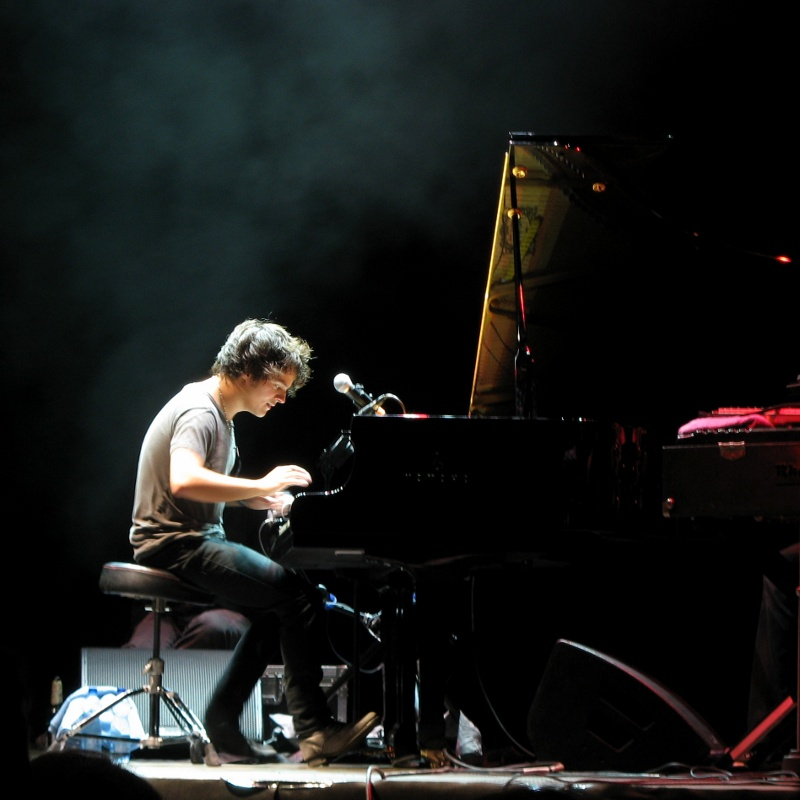
Jamie Cullum at Colours of Ostrava, 2009

- 2008: Sinéad O'Connor, Goldfrapp, Happy Mondays, Jan Garbarek, Habib Koité, Koop, Shantel & Bucovina Club, Hawkwind, Gogol Bordello, The Dandy Warhols, Lou Rhodes, Noa, Tanya Tagaq, and Deva Premal & Miten
- 2009: Ahn Trio, Asian Dub Foundation, David Byrne, Jamie Cullum, Jape, Johnny Clegg, Jon Anderson, KTU, Maceo Parker, Michael Nyman Band, Morcheeba, Mamady Keïta, Mercury Rev, Stereo MC's, Glenn Kaiser Band, The Violet Burning, and Tata Bojs
- 2010: Iggy Pop & the Stooges, The Cranberries, Regina Spektor, Afro Celt Sound System, Jaga Jazzist, El Gran Silencio, Erik Truffaz Paris Project, Porcupine Tree, Mor Karbasi, Alejandro Toledo and the Magic Tombolinos, The Proclaimers, Sophie Hunger, and Zion Train
- 2011: Grinderman, Salif Keita, Public Image Ltd, Yann Tiersen, Clannad, Balkan Brass Battle, Swans, Apollo 440, Brendan Perry, Santigold, The Horrors, Semi Precious Weapons, The Herbaliser, Blackfield, Lisa Hannigan, Joan As Police Woman, Mono, Dubioza kolektiv, La Shica, and Frank Yamma
- 2012: Alanis Morissette, Bobby McFerrin, The Flaming Lips, ZAZ, Janelle Monáe, Antony and the Johnsons, Rufus Wainwright and His Band, Animal Collective, Infected Mushroom, Mogwai, Parov Stelar Band, Kronos Quartet / Kimmo Pohjonen / Samuli Kosminen, Ibrahim Maalouf, Staff Benda Bilili, Fink, Hjaltalín, Portico Quartet, Katzenjammer, Bassekou Kouyate & Ngoni Ba, and Hugh Masekela
- 2013: Sigur Rós, Jamie Cullum, The xx, The Knife, Tomahawk, Damien Rice, Bonobo, Asaf Avidan, Woodkid, Russkaja, Devendra Banhart, Tiken Jah Fakoly, Maria Peszek, Kumbia Queers, Dub FX, Rokia Traoré & Inspiral Carpets, Jon Hassell, Sara Tavares, Balkan Beat Box, Aziz Sahmaoui & University of Gnawa, Irie Révoltés, Tata Bojs, Markéta Irglová, Pražský výběr, Aneta Langerová, Xindl X, and Wanastowi Vjecy

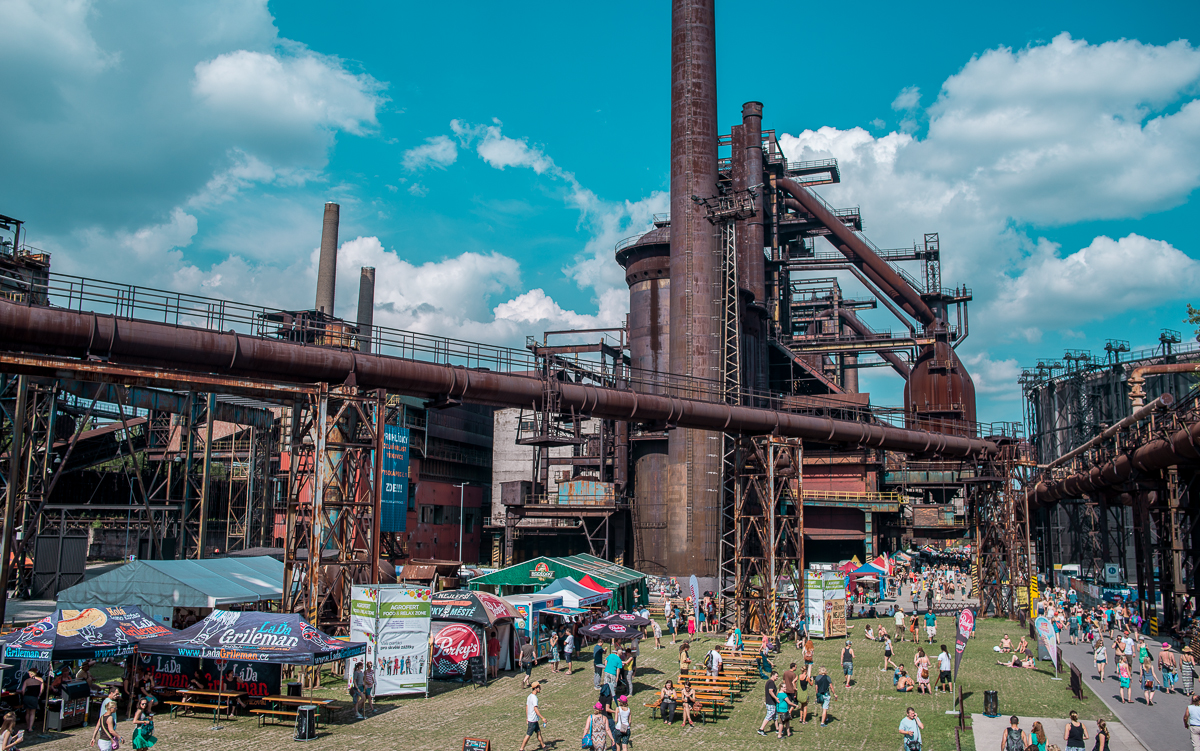
Colours of Ostrava 2014 in Dolní oblast Vítkovice

- 2014: Robert Plant and the Sensational Space Shifters, The National, ZAZ, MGMT, Bastille, John Newman, John Butler Trio, MØ, Angélique Kidjo, Chet Faker, Emilíana Torrini, Trentemøller, Seasick Steve, The Asteroids Galaxy Tour, Les Tambours du Bronx, Hidden Orchestra, Jamie Woon, Ólafur Arnalds, Shaka Ponk, Charles Bradley and His Extraordinaires, Korben Dallas, A Tribe Called Red, Dan Bárta & Illustratosphere, Monkey Business, Chinaski, Bára Hrzánová & Condurango, Anna K, 5P Luboše Pospíšila, Lake Malawi, and Gipsy.cz
- 2015: Björk, Kasabian, Rudimental, St. Vincent, Mika, Clean Bandit, José González, The Cinematic Orchestra, Rodrigo y Gabriela, Caribou, Roni Size & Reprazent, Avishai Cohen's New York Division, Klangkarussell, HVOB, William Fitzsimmons, Michal Hrůza a kapela Hrůzy, Vladimír Mišík & Etc, Lenny, Floex, Xindl X, Aneta Langerová, Lenka Dusilová a Baromantika, Vladimír Merta Trio, and Telefon Tel Aviv
- 2016: Tame Impala, Of Monsters and Men, M83, Passenger, Thievery Corporation, Kodaline, The Vaccines, Caro Emerald, Underworld, Sharon Kovacs, Monkey Business, Lake Malawi, Barbora Poláková, DVA, Už jsme doma, Korben Dallas, and 2Cellos
- 2017: Imagine Dragons, alt-J, Norah Jones, Jamiroquai, Midnight Oil, Moderat, Birdy, LP, Laura Mvula, Benjamin Clementine, Unkle, Michael Kiwanuka, Justice, Zrní, Michal Hrůza, Tata Bojs, Aneta Langerová, Nouvelle Vague, Walking on Cars, and Faada Freddy
- 2018: N.E.R.D. with Pharrell Williams, Kygo, Jessie J, Grace Jones, George Ezra, Paul Kalkbrenner, Joss Stone, Cigarettes After Sex, Kaleo, London Grammar, Future Islands, Beth Ditto, Ziggy Marley, Mura Masa, Aurora, Oumou Sangaré, Dobet Gnahoré, Calexico, Jon Hopkins, GusGus, and Slaves
- 2019: Florence and the Machine, Rag'n'Bone Man, The Cure, Mariza, Zaz, MØ, Years & Years, Tom Walker, Mogwai, Shaka Ponk, The John Butler Trio, Hiromi Uehara, Xavier Rudd, Lewis Capaldi, Rosalía, Richie Hawtin, and Calypso Rose
- 2022: Twenty One Pilots, The Killers, Martin Garrix, LP, Princess Nokia, Wardruna, Meduza, Larkin Poe, Phoebe Bridgers, Hiromi Uehara, Marina Satti & Fonés, Darkstar, Tindersticks, Sam Ryder, Franz Ferdinand, Kings of Convenience, Voice of Baceprot, Inhaler, and Modest Mouse
- 2023: OneRepublic, Macklemore, Interpol, Jacob Collier, Purple Disco Machine, Niall Horan, Tom Grennan, Gilberto Gil, Ewa Farna, Monkey Business, Benny Cristo, and Chinaski
