= Václav Havel Tribute Concert =

2011 memorial event for former Czech president

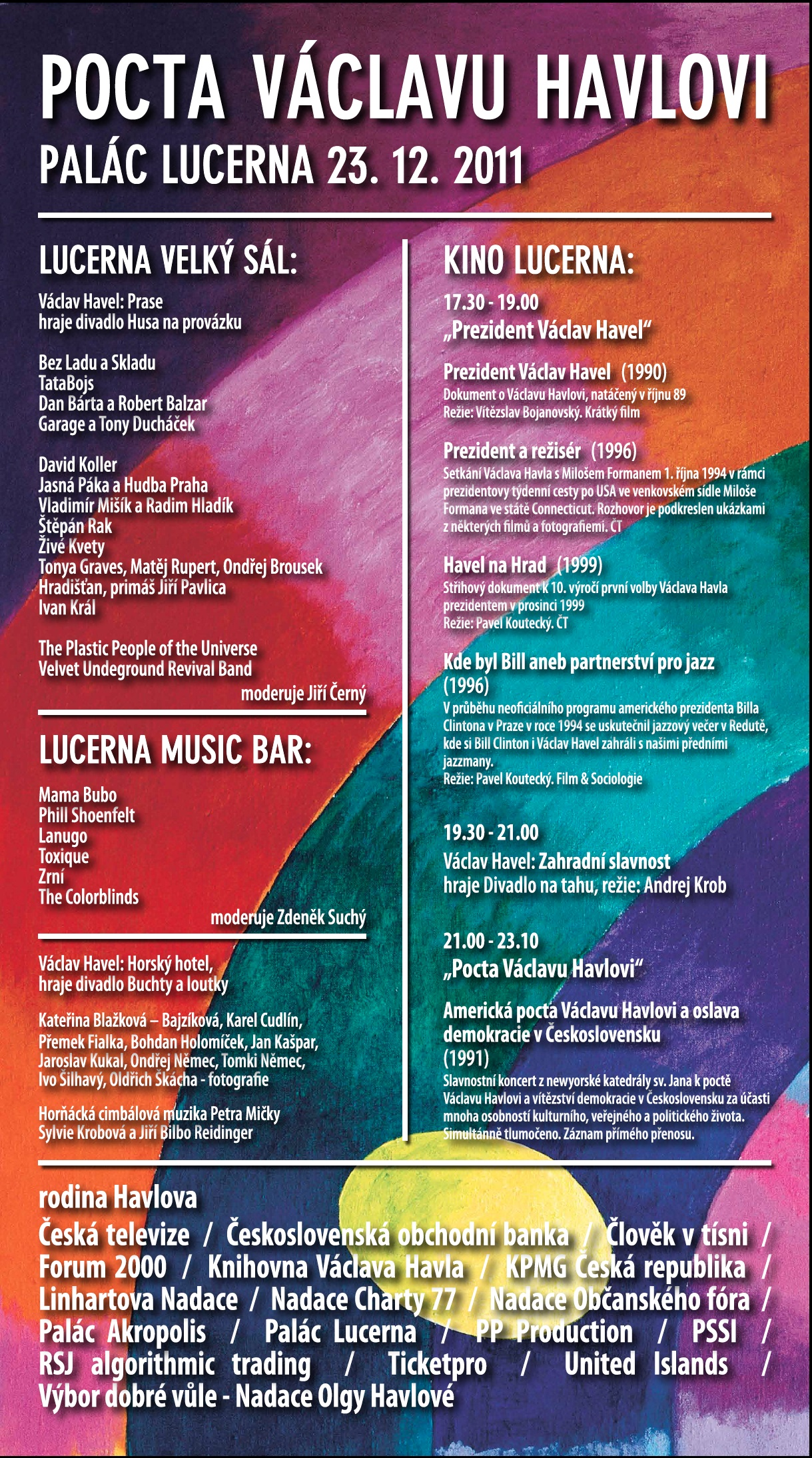
The poster.

Tribute to Václav Havel (Czech: Pocta Václavu Havlovi) was an event held in memory of Václav Havel, the last Czechoslovak and the first Czech President, writer, playwright and human rights activist. The concert took place in Lucerna Music Bar in Prague on 23 December 2011, five days after the death of Havel.

== Main organisers of the event ==
- David Gaydečka (Manager of the Goe's Garage)
- Vladimír Hanzel (Former Secretary to President Václav Havel)
- Jakub Mejdřický (PP Production)
- Lubomír Schmidtmayer (Director of the Palace Akropolis)
- Jindra Zemanová (Meet Factory)

== Stages ==
=== Lucerna Great Hall ===
Moderator: Jiří Černý

- 5:30 pm - Bez ladu a skladu
- 6:30 pm - Tata Bojs
- 6:50 pm - Dan Bárta and Robert Balzar
- 7:00 pm - Garage & Tony Ducháček
- 7:45 pm - David Koller and Ivan Král
- 8:10 pm - Jasná Páka and Hudba Praha
- 8:40 pm - Radim Hladík and Vladimír Mišík
- 8:50 pm - Štěpán Rak
- 8:55 pm - Živé kvety
- 9:15 pm - Tonya Graves, Matěj Ruppert and Ondřej Brousek
- 9:30 pm - Hradišťan (Jiří Pavlica)
- 9:45 pm - Suzanne Vega
- 9:50 pm - Ivan Král and Jan Ponocný
- 10:30 pm - The Plastic People of the Universe
- 11:10 pm - The Velvet Underground Revival Band
- 11:30 pm - End of concert

=== Lucerna Music Bar ===
Moderator: Zdeněk Suchý

- 6:00 pm - Máma Bubo
- 6:40 pm - Phil Shoenfelt & Southern Cross
- 7:30 pm - Lanugo
- 8:30 pm - Toxique
- 9:35 pm - Zrní
- 10:35 pm - The Colorblinds

=== Lucerna Cinema ===
Documentary films:

- President Václav Havel (Dir. V. Bojanovský, 1990)
- President and Director (1996)
- Havel to the Castle (Dir. P. Koutecký, 1998)
- American in Prague or Partnership for Jazz (Dir. P. Koutecký, 1994)
- "An American Tribute to Vaclav Havel and a Celebration of Democracy in Czechoslovakia" held in St. John the Divine, New York (Dir. Caroline Stoessinger, 1990)

Live performance

- Václav Havel: Garden Party - Theatre Divadlo na tahu, Dir. Andrej Krob

=== Lucerna Cinema Café ===
Photographs of Václav Havel
Curator: Kateřina Blažková-Bajzíková
Photographers:

- Karel Cudlín
- Jiří Jírů
- Bohdan Holomíček
- Jaroslav Kukal
- Tomki Němec
- Oldřich Škácha
