= J.A.R. (band) =

Czech funk/rock/rap band

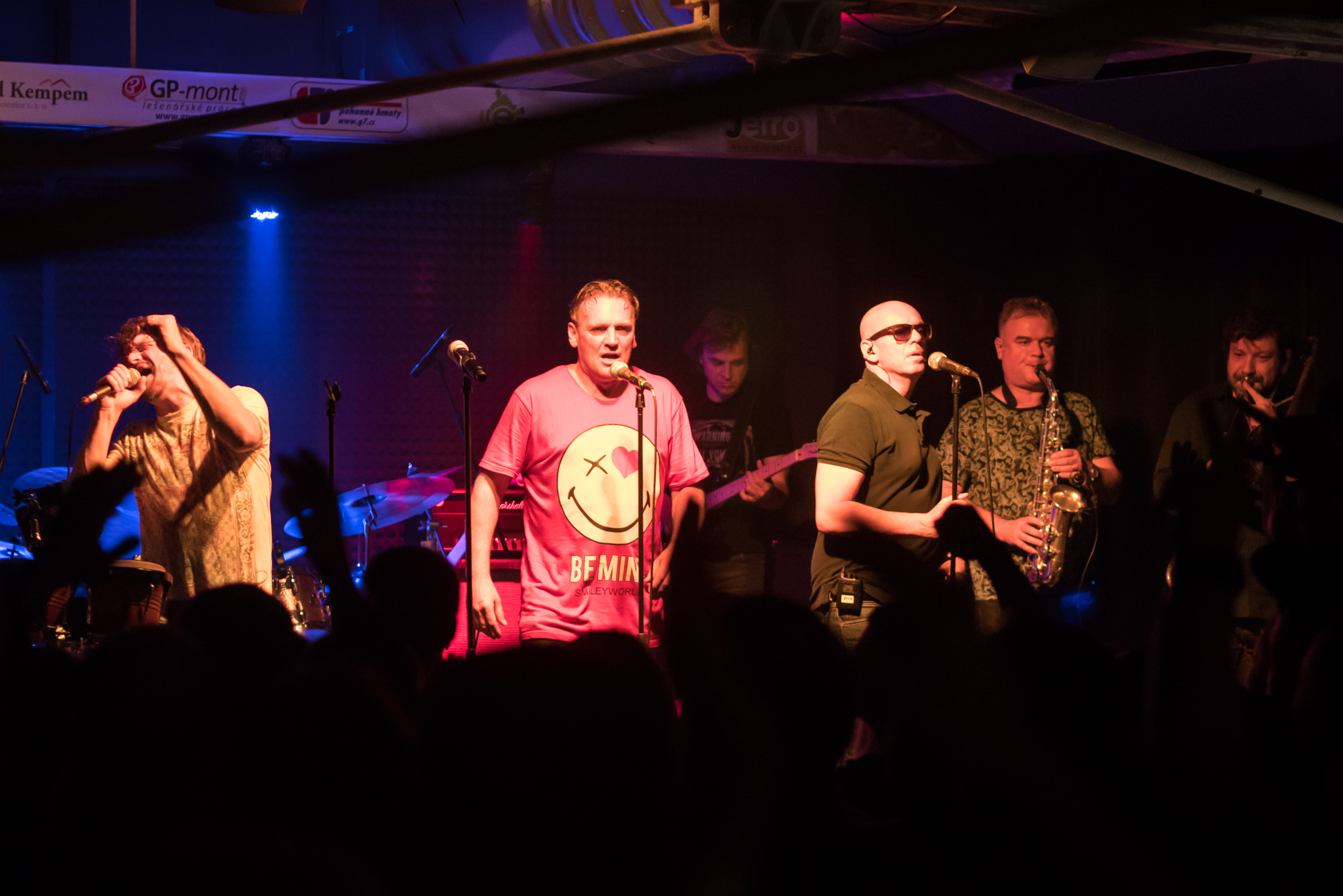
- J.A.R. performing in 2017

Background information
- Also known as: Jednotka Akademického Rapu; Jaromír a Radomír
- Origin: Prague, Czech Republic
- Genres: Funk; rock; hip hop
- Years active: 1989–present
- Labels: BMG; Bonton; Sony; Sony BMG; WMG
- Members: Roman Holý; Michael Viktořík; Dan Bárta; Miroslav Chyška; Pavel Bady Zbořil; Robert Balzar; Filip Jelínek; Radek Kašpar; František Kop
- Past members: Oto Klempíř; Vít Kučaj; Marek Minárik; Jiří Šíma; Karel Růžička mladší

J.A.R. (Jednotka Akademického Rapu or Jaromír a Radomír) is a Czech funk/rock/hip hop band formed in 1989 in Prague. It consists of musicians who are part of other bands and projects, including solo careers, who meet up periodically to record and perform together. They play an annual anniversary show at Prague's Lucerna Music Bar. As of 2026, they have released 11 studio albums, one compilation, one remix album, and one video album.

== Background and history ==
J.A.R. is a group of musicians who are involved in various other projects, including solo careers, who meet up periodically to record and perform together. They play an annual show at Prague's Lucerna Music Bar on 17 November to commemorate their founding.

J.A.R. started out in 1989 with vocalist and keyboardist Roman Holý (Monkey Business), together with rappers Oto Klempíř and Michael Viktořík. They released two rock albums, Frtka in 1992 and Mydli-to! in 1994, and on their third, Mein Kampfunk (1997), they were joined by singer Dan Bárta, which solidified the core of the band. The record included a brass section consisting of Filip Jelínek on trombone, with Radek Kašpar and František Kop on saxophone, as the band began incorporating funk into their sound.

By the time J.A.R. issued their fourth studio album, Homo Fonkianz, in 1999, the group comprised ten members: Holý, Klempíř, Viktořík, Bárta, Jelínek, Kašpar, and Kop, as well as Pavel Bady Zbořil on drums, Robert Balzar on bass, and Miroslav Chyška on guitar. The same year, they released a video album titled V deseti letí desetiletím.

J.A.R.'s subsequent record, Nervák, came out in 2002. They followed it with Armáda špásu in 2006 and Dlouhohrající děcka in 2011. In 2014, the band celebrated their 25th anniversary. In 2017, their eighth record, titled Eskalace dobra, came out, and J.A.R. followed up two years later with an album of covers of Czech songs, titled Eskalace bobra. It included tracks by such artists as Midi Lidi, František Štorm, Barbora Poláková, Mňága a Žďorp, and Monkey Business.

In 2023, J.A.R. released their latest record, titled Jesus Kristus neexistus?

In 2025, founding member Oto Klempíř was removed from the band after announcing his candidacy in the Czech parliamentary election, running as an independent under the banner of the right-wing populist Motorists for Themselves party. Having been the top list candidate on the party's slate in the Plzeň Region, Klempíř was elected to the Chamber of Deputies of the Czech Republic, with the party receiving 6.77% of the nationwide vote.

== Awards ==
- Anděl Award for Band of the Year (2017)
- Anděl Award for Album of the Year – Eskalace dobra (2017)
- Anděl Award for Song of the Year – "Zhublas" (2017)
- Anděl Award for Band of the Year (2023)

== Band members ==
Current

- Roman Holý – vocals, keyboards
- Michael Viktořík – rap
- Dan Bárta – vocals, rap
- Miroslav Chyška – guitar
- Pavel Bady Zbořil – drums
- Robert Balzar – bass
- Filip Jelínek – trombone
- Radek Kašpar – saxophone
- František Kop – saxophone

Past

- Oto Klempíř – rap (1989–2025)
- Vít Kučaj – guitar (1990)
- Marek Minárik – bass (1997)
- Jiří Šíma – saxophone (1990–91)
- Karel Růžička mladší – saxophone (1997)

== Discography ==
Studio albums

- Frtka (1992)
- Mydli-to! (1994)
- Mein Kampfunk (1997)
- Homo Fonkianz (1999)
- Nervák (2002)
- Armáda špásu (2006)
- Dlouhohrající děcka (2011)
- Eskalace dobra (2017)
- Eskalace bobra (2019)
- Jezus Kristus Neexistus? (2023)

Compilations

- 1989–2009 (2009)

Remix albums

- Ťo ti ťo jemixes (2000)

Video albums

- V deseti letí desetiletím (1999)
