= Oto Klempíř =

Czech politician (born 1963)

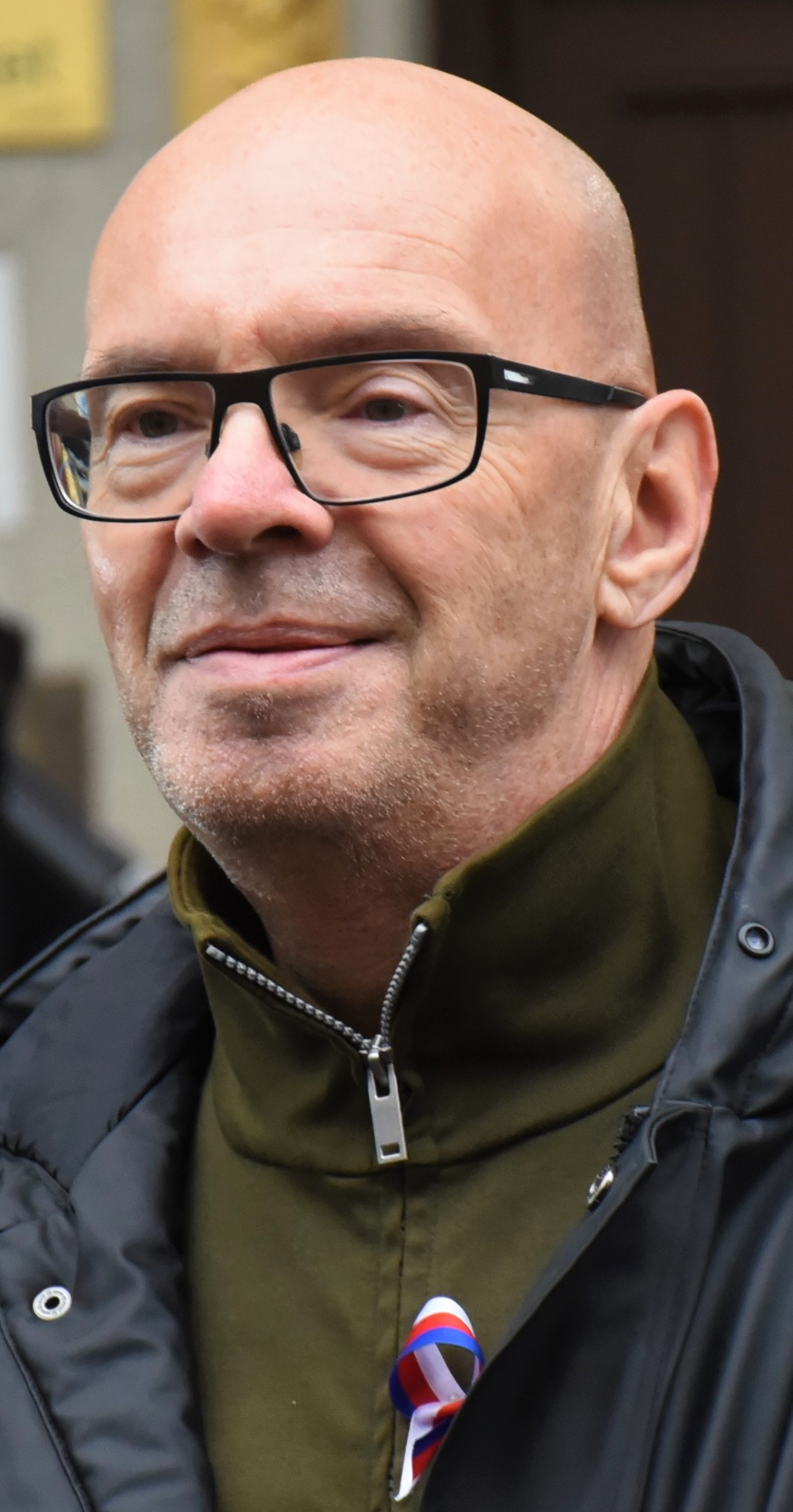
- Klempíř in 2022

Minister of Culture
- Incumbent
- Assumed office 15 December 2025
- Prime Minister: Andrej Babiš
- Preceded by: Martin Baxa

Member of the Chamber of Deputies
- Incumbent
- Assumed office 4 October 2025
- Constituency: Plzeň Region

Personal details
- Born: 20 May 1963 (age 62) Kyjov, Czechoslovakia
- Party: Independent (nominated by Motorists for Themselves) (2025–present)

Oto Klempíř (born 20 May 1963) is a Czech musician and politician, who has served as the Czech Minister of Culture in the third cabinet of Andrej Babiš since December 2025. He has been a member of the Chamber of Deputies for Motorists for Themselves since 2025. From 1989 to 2025, he was a frontman and lyricist for J.A.R. He has also written lyrics for Dan Bárta, Kamil Střihavka, Helena Vondráčková, Iveta Bartošová and Olympic.

From February 1984 to September 1985, Klempíř was registered as a secret collaborator (informant) for the Czechoslovak state security service (StB) under the code name 'Olda'.
