= VOB (disambiguation) =

VOB refers to a data structure on a DVD-video media. It may also refer to:

- Versioned Object Base in IBM DevOps Code ClearCase
- Voice over Broadband an application of Voice over Internet Protocol
- A Vision of Britain, a website
- Voice of Baceprot, Indonesian all-female rock trio

== See also ==
- Association of German Public Banks (VÖB)
