= Anděl Awards =

Czech annual music award ceremony

- Awarded for: Excellence in music
- Sponsored by: Coca-Cola
- Country: Czech Republic
- Presented by: Czech Academy of Popular Music
- Formerly called: Annual Czechoslovak Music Award; Gramy; Anděl Allianz
- First award: 1997
- Final award: 2025

Highlights
- Most wins: Lucie; Lucie Bílá
- Website: andelceny.cz

The Anděl Awards (Czech: Ceny Anděl) is a Czech music award ceremony organized by the Czech Academy of Popular Music.

== History ==
It is a successor to the Annual Czechoslovak Music Award (Czech: Výroční československé hudební ceny) established in 1991 in Czechoslovakia. Between 1992 and 1995, it was known as Gramy, with award categories matching the American Grammy Awards and the prize being represented by a ceramic gramophone statuette. Since 1997, it bears the current name, with the prize including a statuette of an angel with open wings playing a horn, designed by sculptor Jaroslav Róna.

== Name history ==
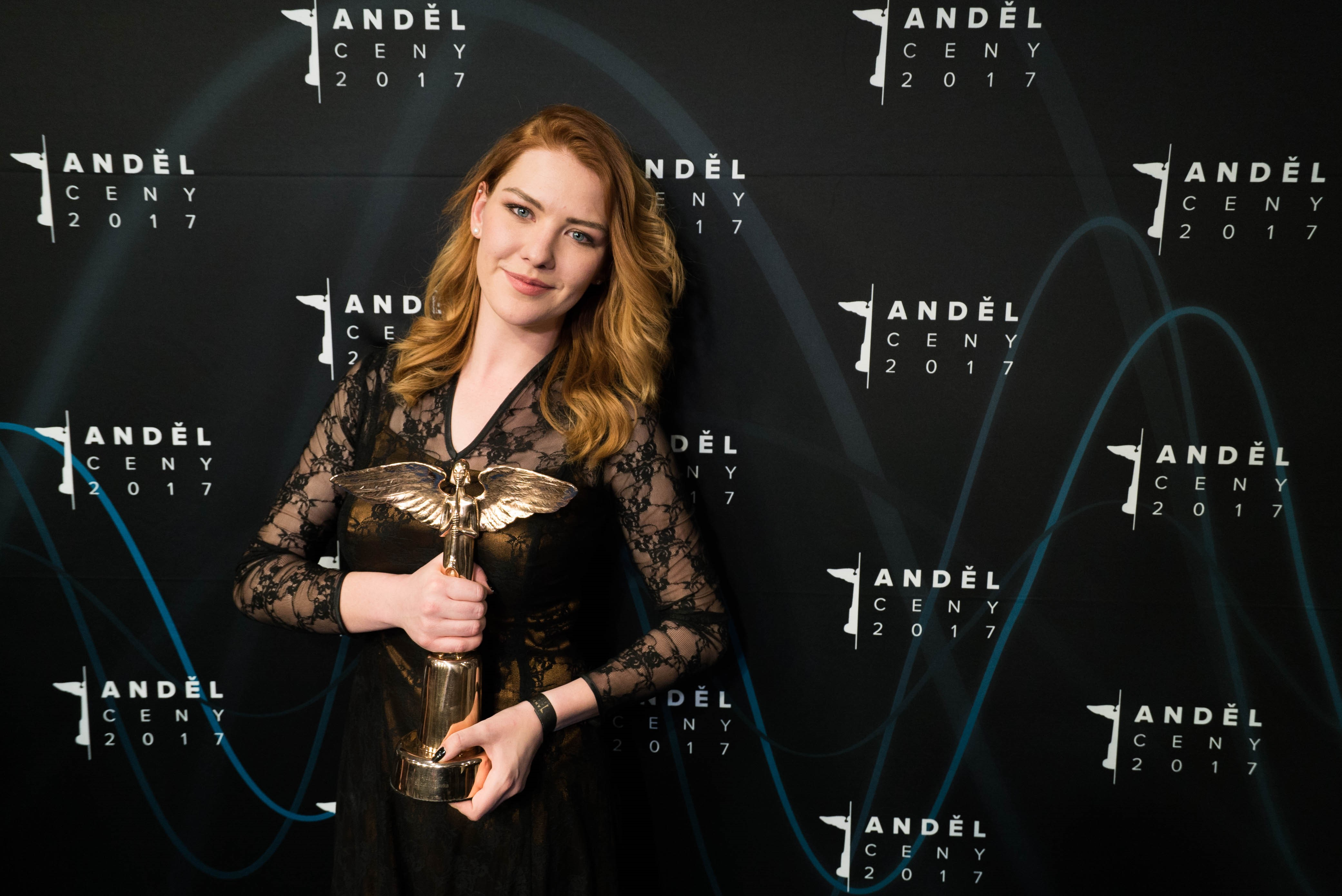
Debbi receiving an Anděl Award in 2017

- 1991: Annual Czechoslovak Music Award (Czech: Výroční československé hudební ceny)
- 1992–1995: Gramy
- 1996: Czech Grammys (Czech: Česká Gramy)
- 1997: Academy of Music Awards (Czech: Ceny Hudební akademie)
- 1998–2000: Academy of Popular Music Awards (Czech: Ceny Akademie populární hudby)
- 2001–2002: Anděl
- 2003–2007: Anděl Allianz
- 2008–2018: Anděl
- 2019–present: Anděl Coca-Cola

== Categories ==
=== Award categories ===
- Band of the Year
- Male Singer of the Year
- Female Singer of the Year
- Hall of Fame
- Discovery of the Year
- Composition of the Year
- Album of the Year
- Video of the Year
- Slovak Album of the Year

=== Genre awards as of 2020 ===
- Alternative & Electronic
- Folk
- Jazz
- Classical
- Rap
- Rock

== Most successful artists ==
Artist	Number of wins
Lucie	15
Lucie Bílá	15
Dan Bárta	13
Kryštof	13
Buty	11
Monkey Business	10
Aneta Langerová	10
Tata Bojs	8
Lenka Dusilová	6
Bratři Ebenové	6
Robert Křesťan	6
Vladimír Mišík	6
Jaromír Honzák	5
Iva Bittová	4
Anna K	4
Chinaski	4
Tomáš Klus	4
David Koller	4
Jaromír Nohavica	3
Support Lesbiens	3
Insania	3
Květy	3
Šlapeto	3

== Winners by year ==
Year	Male singer	Female singer	Band
1991	Pavol Habera	Bára Basiková	Lucie
1992	Petr Muk	Lucie Bílá	Shalom
1993	Ivan Hlas	Lucie Bílá	Yo Yo Band
1994	Dan Bárta	Lucie Bílá	Lucie
1995	Kamil Střihavka	Lucie Bílá	Buty
1996	Janek Ledecký	Iva Bittová	Žlutý pes
1997	Daniel Hůlka	Lucie Bílá	Buty
1998	Dan Bárta	Lucie Bílá	Lucie
1999	Dan Bárta	Anna K	Buty
2000	Dan Bárta	Lenka Dusilová	Monkey Business
2001	Dan Bárta	Helena Vondráčková	Čechomor
2002	Dan Bárta	Kateřina Winterová	Support Lesbiens
2003	Dan Bárta	Radůza	Kabát
2004	Dan Bárta	Aneta Langerová	Tata Bojs
2005	Petr Kolář	Lenka Dusilová	Chinaski
2006	Matěj Ruppert	Anna K	Kryštof
2007	Matěj Ruppert	Aneta Langerová	Chinaski
2008	Dan Bárta	Lenka Dusilová	Kryštof
2009	Tomáš Klus	Ewa Farna	Monkey Business
2010	David Koller	Lucie Bílá	Nightwork
2011	Tomáš Klus	Lenka Dusilová	Mandrage
2012	Vojtěch Dyk	Aneta Langerová	Kryštof
2013	Dan Bárta	Lenka Dusilová	Bratři Orffové
2014	Michal Hrůza	Aneta Langerová	Chinaski
2015	David Koller	Klara	Kryštof
2016	Thom Artway	Lenny	Jelen
2017	David Stypka	Debbi	J.A.R.
2018	Miro Žbirka	Barbora Poláková	Monkey Business
2019	Vladimír Mišík	Beata Hlavenková	Mirai
2020	7krát3	Lenka Dusilová	Tata Bojs
2021	David Stypka	Ewa Farna	Mirai
2022	Miro Žbirka	Lenny	Vypsaná fiXa
2023	David Koller	Pam Rabbit	J.A.R.
2024	Vladimír Mišík	Kateřina Marie Tichá	Monkey Business
2025	Michal Prokop	Klara	Mňága a Žďorp
