= Petr Muk =

Czech musician (1965–2010)

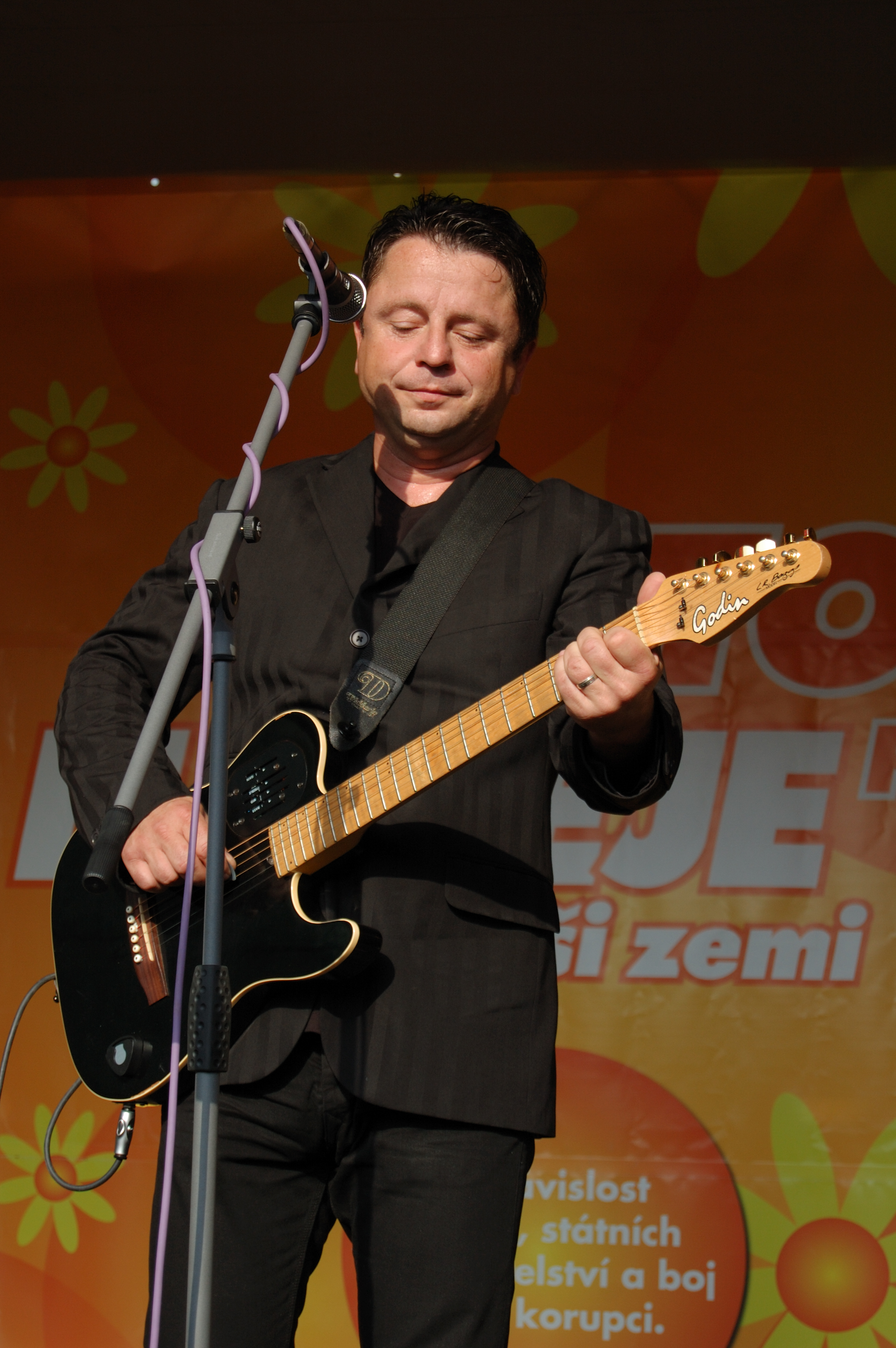
- Muk performing in 2009

Background information
- Born: 4 February 1965; Český Krumlov, Czechoslovakia
- Died: 24 May 2010 (aged 45) Prague, Czech Republic
- Genres: Pop; new wave; synth-pop
- Occupations: Singer; musician; songwriter; composer
- Instruments: Vocals; guitar; bass; keyboards
- Years active: 1985–2010
- Labels: EMI
- Formerly of: Oceán; Shalom
- Website: petrmuk.cz

Petr Muk (4 February 1965 – 24 May 2010) was a Czech pop musician, composer, and performer, famous in the Czech Republic and Slovakia. Muk began playing music at the age of fifteen, performing with various underground punk bands including Dural and Gas, together with classmate and later bandmate Petr Kučera. From 1985 until 1993, he led the Czech synth-pop group Oceán, after which he founded the synth-pop group Shalom (1992–1996). Both these ensembles were heavily influenced by the English synth-pop duo Erasure, a band whose UK tour Oceán had supported between 1989 and 1990. In 2004, Muk released a tribute EP to his idols.

Since 1997, when he released his first solo album, Muk performed as a solo artist, often in musicals and operas such as Rusalka, Joan of Arc (cs), Karel Svoboda's Golem (cs), and Janek Ledecký's Galileo. On his solo records he also covered songs by artists including Olympic, Václav Neckář, and Karel Černoch.

In 2010, Muk was found dead by his wife in their home in Prague. The official cause of death was asphyxia from vomit inhalation, and an autopsy and blood work revealed he had medical drugs and alcohol in his blood. Muk had bipolar disorder.

== Awards ==
- Český slavík – Silver (2002), (2003)
- Český slavík – Bronze (2004)
- TýTý television viewers' awards (2001), (2004)
- Anděl Awards, several nominations

== Discography ==
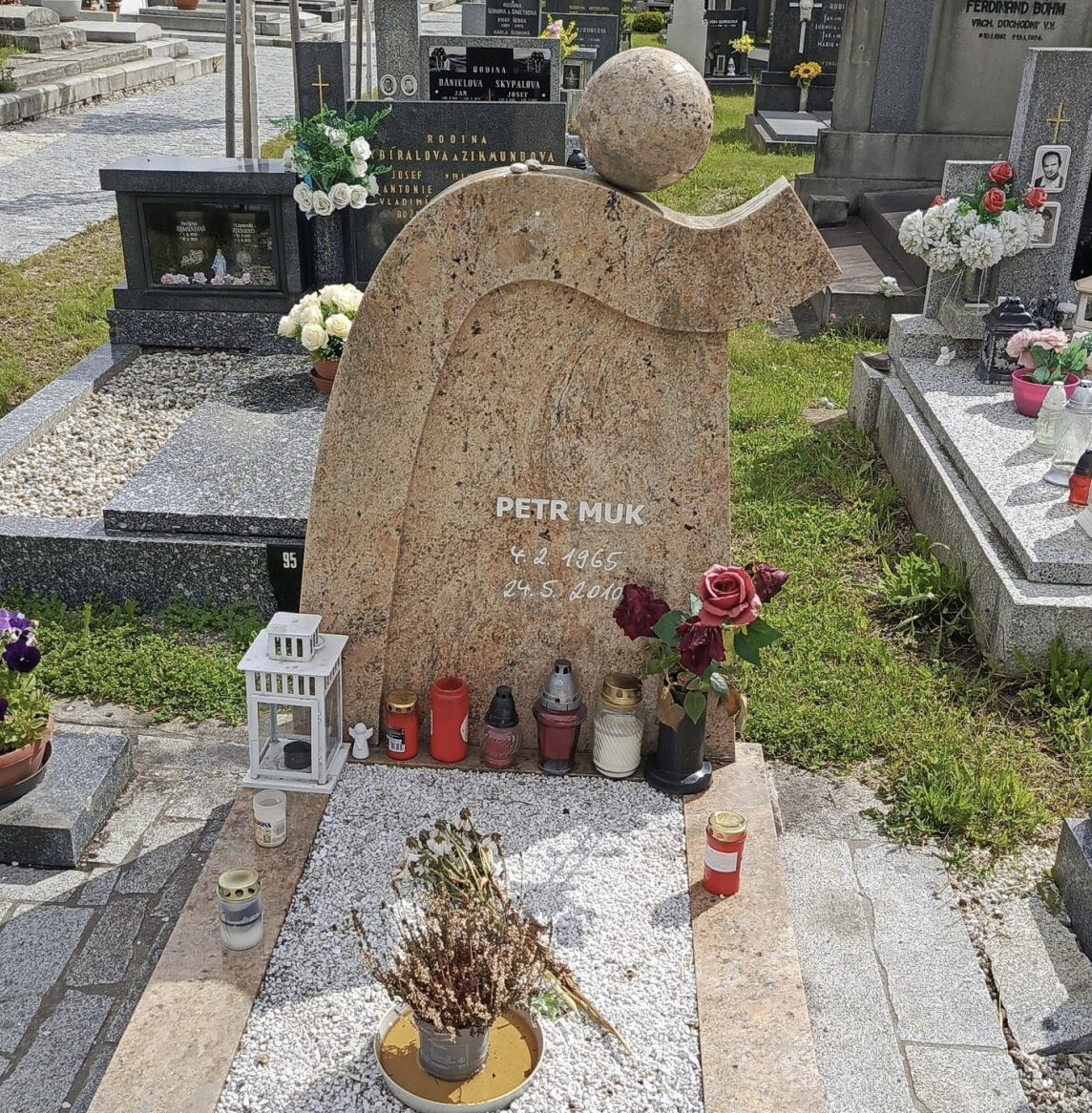
Petr Muk's grave in Český Krumlov

=== Solo ===
Studio albums

- Petr Muk (1997)
- Jizvy Lásky (2000)
- Dotyky Snu (2002)
- Osud Ve Dlaních (2005)
- Muzikál a Film (2009)
- V bludišti dnů (2010)

EPs

- Loď ke hvězdám (1997)
- Ona se brání/Zrcadlo (2000)
- Oh L'Amour (2004) – tribute to Erasure

Compilations

- Slunce / To Nejlepší (2007)
- Outro (2011) – posthumous release
- Od A do Z (2011) – posthumous release
- Předtím...A Potom (2017) – posthumous release
- Sny zůstanou (Definitive Best of) (to be released 24 January 2020)

DVDs

- Zrcadlo (Videoklipy 1992–2004) (2004) – collection of music videos
- L'Amour Tour 2004 (2005) – concert filmed in Prague on 12 December 2004

=== with Oceán ===
- Dávná zem (1990)
- Pyramida snů (1991)
- 2 1/2 (1992)

=== with Shalom ===
- Shalom (1992)
- Brány vzkazů (1994)
