= Klara (singer) =

Czech singer (born 1985)

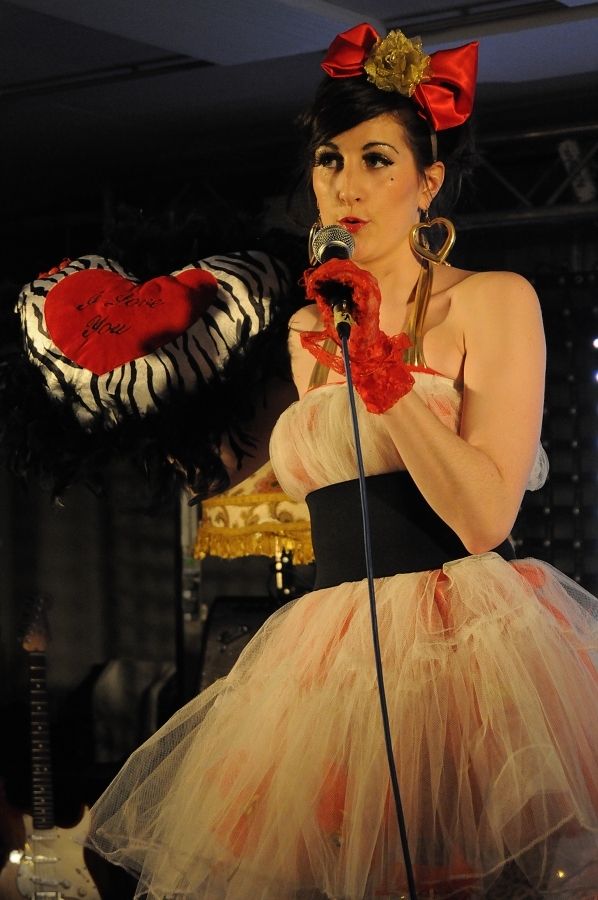
- Klara performing with Toxique in 2009.

Background information
- Born: Klára Vytisková; 3 May 1985 (age 41); Prague, Czechoslovakia
- Origin: Czech Republic
- Genres: Pop; rock
- Occupation: Singer
- Years active: 2008–present
- Label: Warner
- Website: www.klaravytiskova.cz

Klára Vytisková (born 3 May 1985), better known as Klara (stylized as KLARA.), is a Czech singer. She was named Female Singer of the Year at the 2015 and 2025 Anděl Awards. She is the daughter of bass guitarist Vladimír Vytiska. She was a judge on the fourth season of Czech and Slovak SuperStar and performed as part of band Toxique.

== Discography ==
=== Studio albums ===
- 2015: Home
- 2020: Love Is Gold
- 2025: VEGA
