= Zrní =

Czech alternative rock band

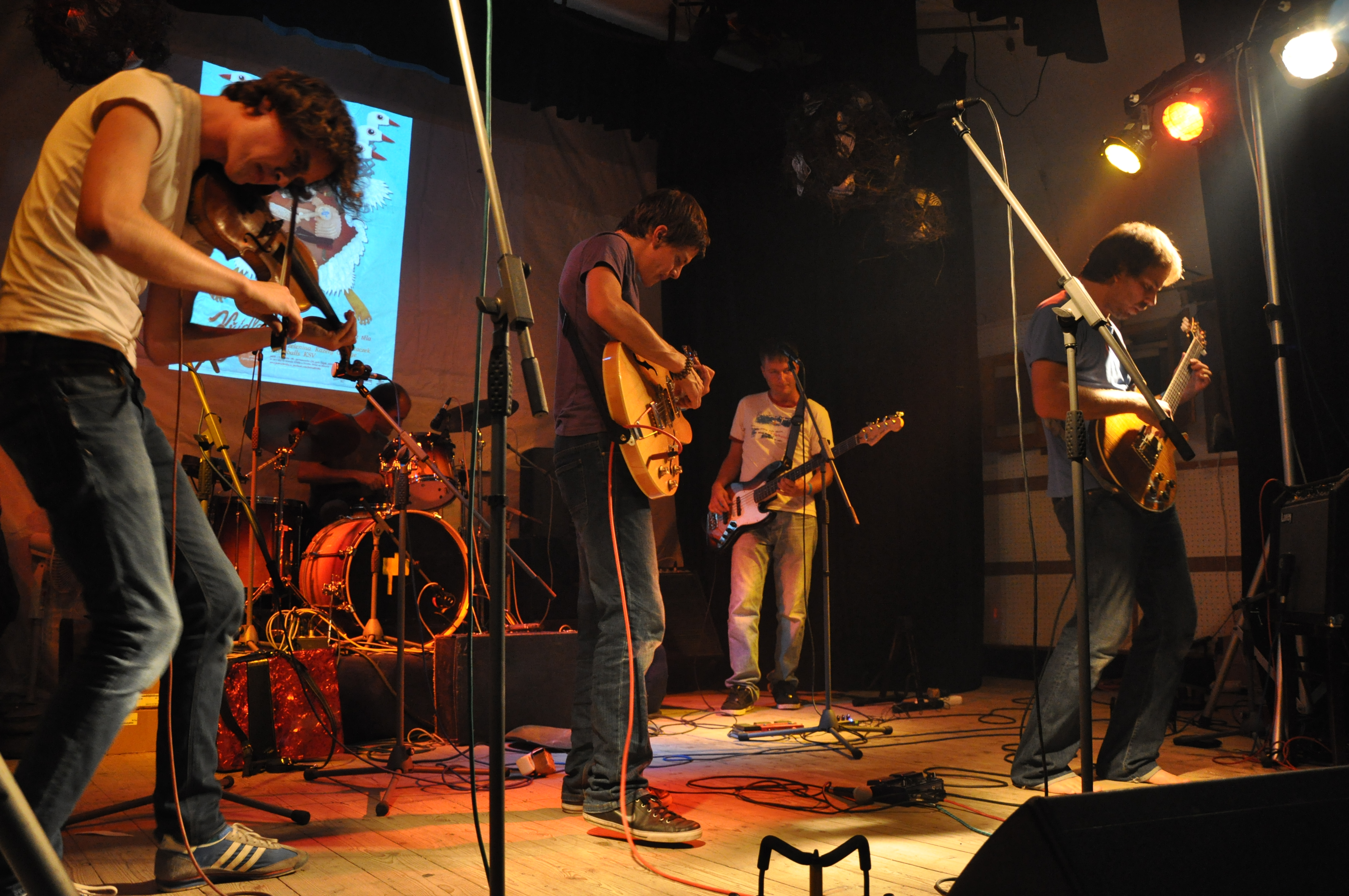
Zrní in 2011

Zrní is a Czech alternative rock band from Kladno.

Their first album, Voní, was released in 2009 after the band had already been together for eight years. Their second album, Hrdina počítačový hry jde do světa, was released in 2011 by the famous songwriter Radůza on her label Radůza Records. In 2012 the band released the album Soundtrack ke konci světa. It was nominated for both the 2012 Vinyla and Apollo awards for Album of the Year, and was also nominated in four categories at the 2012 Anděl Awards. It won the Anděl Award for Discovery of the Year. In September 2014, their album Následuj kojota was nominated for Album of the Year at the Apollo Awards, and it received three nominations at the 2014 Anděl Awards.

In 2015 the band gave a special concert at the Colours of Ostrava festival with the Janáček Philharmonic Orchestra and the Slovak violinist Stano Palúch.

== Band members ==
- Jan Unger / lead vocals, guitar, flute
- Jan Juklík / guitar, vocals
- Jan Fišer / violin, vocals
- Jan Caithaml / bass guitar, vocals
- Ondřej Slavík / drums, accordion, beatbox, vocals

== Discography ==
- Voní, 2009
- Hrdina počítačový hry jde do světa, 2011
- Soundtrack ke konci světa, 2012
- Kolik váží vaše touha, 2012
- Následuj kojota, 2014
- Čtyři Honzové a jeden Ondřej v severní části Střeleckého ostrova (Live), 2015
- Jiskřící, 2017
- Spící (EP), 2018
- Zrní a Filharmonie HK živě ve Foru Karlín (Live), 2019
- Nebeský klid, 2020
- Široko daleko, 2023
