= Toxique =

Czech musical group

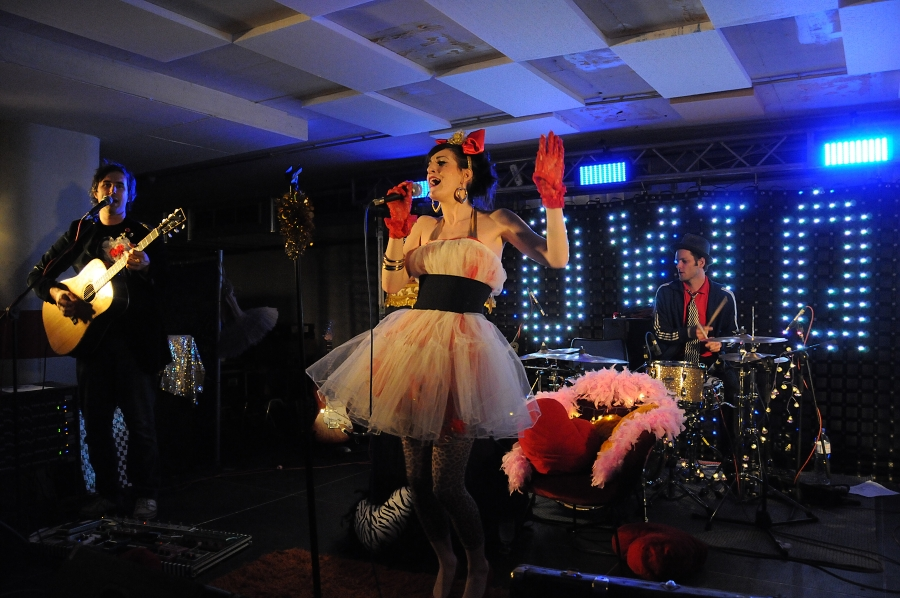
- Toxique at the Febiofest festival, 2009

Background information
- Origin: Czech Republic
- Genres: Pop, electronic
- Years active: 2007–present (hiatus from 2015)
- Members: Klára Vytisková; Patrick Karpentski; Viliam Béreš; Jan Lstibůrek; Roman Vícha
- Website: (archive)

Toxique are a Czech musical group performing electronic pop music.

== History ==
The group was founded by five graduates from Prague's Institute of Chemical Technology in early 2007, and the same year they played their first live show. Toxique's debut single, "Two Sides", took part in national selection for Czech's entry in the Eurovision Song Contest 2008. Although it didn't make it to the semi-finals, it became a considerable hit, reaching no. 35 in Czech national airplay chart Rádio Top 100. Their debut album, eponymously titled Toxique, was released in 2008 and peaked at no. 32 in the Czech Republic.

In 2009, they released singles "Honey" and "eBay", which did not match the success of their debut song. 2010 saw the release of their second album, Outlet People, preceded by the single "Shout" which made it to no. 52 in Rádio Top 100. The album itself proved to be more successful, debuting at no. 26 and meeting with favourable reviews. In November, the band toured the UK with Polish singer Kayah as part of O2's Your Country live concert series.

Toxique released their third album, Tips for Grown Up Kids, in 2012, promoted by the single "Toxique Girls", featuring Czech-Polish singer Ewa Farna. The song garnered considerable popularity, however, the album failed to chart. In 2013, the band's lead vocalist Klára Vytisková embarked on a solo career and released singles "Country Girl" and "Survival".

== Band members ==
- Klára Vytisková – vocals
- Patrick Karpentski – guitar
- Viliam Béreš – keyboard
- Jan Lstibůrek – bass guitar
- Roman Vícha – drums

== Discography ==
=== Albums ===
- 2008: Toxique
- 2010: Outlet People
- 2012: Tips for Grown Up Kids

=== Singles ===
- 2008: "Two Sides"
- 2009: "Honey"
- 2009: "eBay"
- 2010: "Shout"
- 2011: "Field Lines"
- 2012: "Toxique Girls" (feat. Ewa Farna)
- 2012: "Turn Me On"

== Awards and nominations ==
Year	Nominated work	Award	Category	Result	Ref
2008	Themselves	Anděl Awards	Discovery of the Year	Winner	
