= Shalom (band) =

Czech synth-pop band

- Genres: Synth-pop
- Years active: 1992–1994
- Labels: Monitor
- Spinoff of: Oceán
- Past members: Petr Muk; Petr Kučera; Petr Hons

Shalom was a Czech synth-pop band active from 1992 until 1994. The core of the project consisted of Petr Muk and Petr Kučera, with consistent support from Petr Hons, three musicians who were until 1993 also active in the popular Erasure-influenced band Oceán from České Budějovice. The trio was complemented by a number of rotating female vocalists including Jana Benetová, Jana Feriová, Jana Badurová, and later Jana Petrová, Linda Finková, Michaela Klímková, and Olina Mašková. Shalom released two studio albums and a number of hit singles before breaking up in 1994.

== History ==
During the Velvet Revolution in Czechoslovakia, the band Oceán, thanks to their manager Jiří Vatka, had the opportunity to open for the English duo Erasure in Prague. Following this, the trio of Kučera, Muk, and Hons came up with a number of song ideas which didn't appeal to the rest of the band, so they decided to create a side project, which they called Shalom. The project dabbled strongly in Jewish themes and symbolism, something Muk had been toying with for a while. In 1992, the self-titled debut album was released. Singers Jana Benetová, Jana Feriová, and Jana Badurová were invited to join the project. The first music videos were recorded in Slovakia, and later in Israel.

In 1992, Shalom were inspired to contribute to the album Give Me More ... Olympic, where thirteen bands paid tribute to legendary Czechoslovak rock band Olympic by choosing one of their songs each, which they edited and recorded in their own style. Shalom recorded the track "Pohřeb své vlastní duše", and a year later they released the single "Olympictures".

In 1994, the band released the single "Someday", which was filmed in London. This song was not included on the sophomore album, however. Vocalists who had worked with Oceán, among them Linda Finková and Michaela Klímková (Petr Muk's wife), participated in the second Shalom album, titled Brány vzkazů, which was released in 1994. This record proved less commercially successful than the previous one, and the group split up shortly after. Petr Muk continued being active in the music scene, with a number of successful solo albums, numerous roles in operas and musicals, until his unexpected death in 2010. Petr Kučera also released a number of solo albums following the demise of his two most successful bands, and in 2011 he returned with a new incarnation of Oceán, which also includes Petr Hons.

== Band members ==
Permanent members

- Petr Muk
- Petr Kučera

Contributing musicians

- Petr Hons
- Jana Benetová
- Jana Feriová
- Jana Badurová
- Linda Finková
- Michaela Klímková
- Olina Mašková
- Jana Petrová

== Discography ==
=== Studio albums ===
- Shalom (1992)
- Brány vzkazů (1994)

=== Compilations ===
- Bon Soir, Mademoiselle Paris (2001, singles collection)
- Shalom komplet (2008, 4-disc box set)

=== Live albums ===
- 5,4,3,2,1: Shalom! (1994)

=== Singles ===
- "Až jednou" (1992)
- "Léto měsíců" (1992)
- "Olympictures" (1993)
- "Ve větru" (1993)
- "Za láskou" (1994)
- "Someday" (1994)
- "Dech" (1994)

=== Other appearances ===
- Dekáda – Oceán, Shalom, Haifa, Déva, Eniel (Monitor-EMI compilation, 1995)

== Awards ==
- Melody Prize – Discovery of the year (1992)
- Anděl Awards – Petr Muk – Singer of the year (1992)
- Anděl Awards Band of the year (1992)
