= Oceán =

Czech synth-pop band

- Origin: České Budějovice, Czech Republic
- Genres: Synth-pop; new wave
- Years active: 1985–1993; 2011–present
- Labels: Opus; Supraphon
- Spinoffs: Shalom
- Members: Jitka Charvátová; Petr Kučera; Jan Vozáry; Petr Hons
- Past members: Petr Muk; Dušan Vozáry; Zdeněk Pavelec; Michaela Klimková
- Website: oceancz.cz

Oceán is a Czech musical group first active between the years 1985–1993, and again since reforming in 2011. The band's best-known incarnation consisted of Petr Muk on vocals, Petr Kučera on keyboards, Jan Vozáry on drums, and Dušan Vozáry on second keyboards. The band underwent a few personnel changes during their early period in the 1980s, and broke up in 1993. They returned in 2011 with a new lineup consisting of Jitka Charvátová (vocals), Petr Kučera (keyboards), Jan Vozáry (drums), and Petr Hons (guitars). The band plays synth-pop and new wave music, and was originally influenced by the British duo Erasure and the band Depeche Mode.

== History ==
Oceán was founded in August 1985. The band members met in high school and had already played together in various underground bands. Michaela Klimková, who went on to marry Petr Muk, was their original vocalist, and Muk played bass. Zdeněk Pavelec was the band's guitarist, but after keyboardist Dušan Vozáry, Jan's brother, joined in 1987, briefly making Oceán a five-piece, Pavelec left and the band's sound, now devoid of guitars, became more synth-oriented. Oceán also worked regularly with Petr Hons, who was unofficially part of the band and who wrote most of their song lyrics. Hons later became a full member after the band regrouped in 2011.

1988 saw the release of Oceán's first single "Ráchel / Dávná zem" on Supraphon Records. "Lék světu / Jeden den" followed in 1989, and the same year the band's idols, British synth-pop duo Erasure, visited Prague on their European tour. From December 1989 to January 1990, Oceán supported Erasure on their UK & Ireland tour, which turned out to be a big success for the Czech band.

In March 1990, they recorded their debut album Dávná zem (Ancient land) at the Opus Records studio in Bratislava. The album was a commercial success, and in the following year, Oceán recorded the follow-up album Pyramida snů (Pyramid of dreams). In July 1991, they performed at the Wallenstein Palace, and the performance was recorded by Czechoslovak Television. The band experienced a steep rise in popularity and went on to record several music videos in Greece. At the beginning of 1992, their maxi single "Haifa" came out, containing four remixes of songs from the album Pyramida snů, and in the same year, the compilation 2 1/2 was released, featuring unreleased demos and other tracks. In 1992, Petr Muk, Petr Kučera, and Oceán's lyricist Petr Hons created a new project, titled Shalom, which continued after the breakup of Oceán.

In 2011, Oceán reunited. The late Petr Muk was replaced by vocalist Jitka Charvátová. At the end of 2014, Dušan Vozáry left the group. They have since released two studio albums, Ve smíru in 2016 and Femme Fatale in 2018.

== Band members ==
Current

- Jitka Charvátová – vocals
- Petr Kučera – keyboards
- Jan Vozáry – drums
- Petr Hons – guitar, bass

Past

- Michaela Klimková – vocals
- Petr Muk – vocals, bass
- Dušan Vozáry – keyboards
- Zdeněk Pavelec – guitar

== Discography ==
=== Studio albums ===
- Dávná zem (1990)
- Pyramida snů (1991)
- Ve smíru (2016)
- Femme Fatale (2018)

=== Compilations ===
- 2 1/2 (1992)
- Dekáda (1995)
- Best of (2009)
- 2 3/4 (2011) (reissue of 2 1/2 + bonus tracks)

=== Live albums ===
- Roxy (2011)
- Pod pyramidou snů (2012)

=== Singles ===
- "Ráchel / Dávná zem" (1988)
- "Lék světu / Jeden den" (1989)
- "Čas / Sen o měděných jablkách" (1990)
- "Narcis / Večer na zámku" (1990)
- "Noc je jako... / Černé je nebe" (1991)
- "Haifa Remix" (Maxi Single, 1992)
- "Odlesk tvůj (Remixes)" (2011)
- "Doufám, že" (2013)
- "Dante" (2016)

=== DVDs ===
- Pod pyramidou snů / Oceán v Řecku (2012)

=== Other appearances ===
- Dekáda – Oceán, Shalom, Haifa, Déva, Eniel (Monitor-EMI compilation, 1995)
