= Monkey Business (band) =

Czech funk band

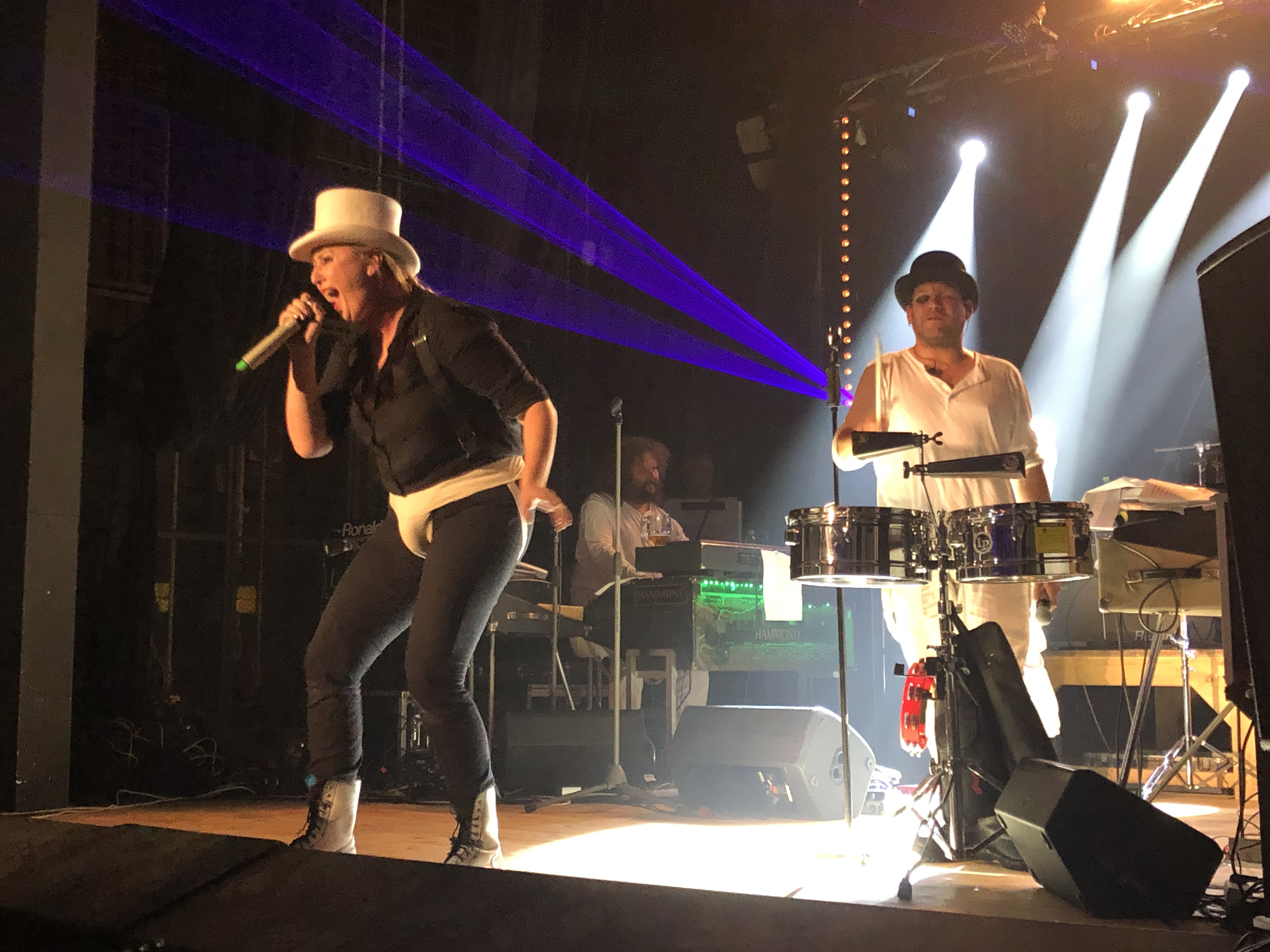
- Monkey Business performing in 2019

Background information
- Origin: Prague, Czech Republic
- Genres: Funk; pop
- Years active: 1999–present
- Labels: Columbia; Devil Inside Music Records; Supraphon
- Members: Matěj Ruppert; Oldřich Krejčoves; Ondřej Brousek; Roman Holý; Pavel Mrázek; Martin Houdek; Tereza Černochová
- Past members: Tonya Graves
- Website: monkeybusiness.cz

Monkey Business is a Czech funk and pop band formed in 1999 in Prague. It is one of the musical projects of multi-instrumentalist and producer Roman Holý, the others being J.A.R. and Sexy Dancers. The band also includes vocalist Matěj Ruppert, guitarist Oldřich Krejčoves, bassist Pavel Mrázek, drummer Martin Houdek, keyboardist Ondřej Brousek, and vocalist Tereza Černochová. As of 2026, they have released eleven studio albums.

== History ==
Monkey Business formed in Prague, Czech Republic, in 1999. The band initially consisted of vocalist Matěj Ruppert, guitarist Oldřich Krejčoves, bassist Pavel Mrázek, drummer Martin Houdek, and keyboardist Ondřej Brousek. Their debut album, Why Be in When You Could Be Out, was released in 2000 and included contributions from Iranian-Czech percussionist Imran Musa Zangi and American trombonist Fred Wesley. The group subsequently added a second vocalist, the American-Czech Tonya Graves, who had previously sung in the band Liquid Harmony.

Monkey Business released their second album, Save the Robots, in 2001, and it once again featured contributions from Fred Wesley as well as drummer Dennis Chambers, guitarist Hiram Bullock, and singer Dan Bárta.

The band's third record, Resistance Is Futile, came out in 2003 and included work by Iva Bittová, Jiří Stivín, Roman Dragoun, and Hiram Bullock.

In 2005, Monkey Business published their fourth album, titled Kiss Me on My Ego. It featured contributions from Imran Musa Zangi, Dan Bárta, Hiram Bullock, Glenn Hughes, and David Sanborn.

The album Objects of Desire and Other Complications followed in 2007, with input from guest musicians such as Imran Musa Zangi and Kamil Střihavka.

Monkey Business released Twilight of Jesters? in 2009, a record that again featured Glenn Hughes and Dan Bárta, as well as Vlastimil Třešňák and Ashley Slater.

Happiness of Postmodern Age followed in 2013, with contributions from Dan Bárta, Ivan Mládek, and Joan Baez. The band's eighth studio album, titled Sex and Sport? Never!, came out in 2015 and featured Mike Stern, Gábor Presser, and Marta Kubišová.

Tonya Graves left Monkey Business in 2016, and she was replaced on vocals by Tereza Černochová before the 2018 release of Bad Time for Gentlemen. The record, the band's ninth, included input from Fred Wesley and Ashley Slater. The band followed it in 2020 with Freedom on Sale, with help from Dan McCafferty and Ashley Slater.

The latest album by Monkey Business is Když Múzy Mlčí, issued in 2024.

== Band members ==
Current

- Matěj Ruppert – vocals (1999–present)
- Tereza Černochová – vocals (2018–present)
- Oldřich Krejčoves – guitar (1999–present)
- Ondřej Brousek – keyboards (1999–present)
- Roman Holý – keyboards, vocals (1999–present)
- Pavel Mrázek – bass guitar (1999–present)
- Martin Houdek – drums (1999–present)

Past

- Tonya Graves – vocals (2000–2016)

== Discography ==
Studio albums

- Why Be in When You Could Be Out (2000)
- Save the Robots (2001)
- Resistance Is Futile (2003)
- Kiss Me on My Ego (2005)
- Objects of Desire and Other Complications (2007)
- Twilight of Jesters? (2009)
- Happiness of Postmodern Age (2013)
- Sex and Sport? Never! (2015)
- Bad Time for Gentlemen (2018)
- Freedom on Sale (2020)
- Když Múzy Mlčí (2024)
- Jinej svět není k dispozici (2026)

EPs

- Nevydané tracky (2003)

Remix albums

- Why Be Out When You Could Be In (2001)
- Kavárna de Luxe (2017)

DVDs

- Lazy Youth Old Beggars (2004)
- Peeing with the Proletariat (2007)

== Awards and nominations ==
Year	Nominated work	Award	Category	Result	Ref
2000	Themselves	Anděl Awards	Group of the Year	Winner	
2000	Themselves	Anděl Awards	Discovery of the Year	Winner	
2003	Resistance Is Futile	Anděl Awards	Pop Album of the Year	Winner	
2004	Lazy Youth Old Beggars	Anděl Awards	DVD of the Year	Winner	
2005	Kiss Me on My Ego	Anděl Awards	Rock, Pop, and Dance Album of the Year	Winner	
2005	Kiss Me on My Ego	Anděl Awards	Best sound recording of the year	Winner	
2007	"Kit Bike"	Anděl Awards	Music Video of the Year	Winner	
2007	Objects of Desire and Other Complications	Anděl Awards	Rock, Pop, and Dance Album of the Year	Winner	
2007	Objects of Desire and Other Complications	Anděl Awards	Packaging of the Year	Winner	
2009	Twilight of Jesters	Anděl Awards	Group of the Year	Winner	
2009	Twilight of Jesters	Anděl Awards	Album of the Year	Nominated	
2018	Bad Time for Gentlemen	Anděl Awards	Group of the Year	Winner	
2018	Bad Time for Gentlemen	Anděl Awards	Album of the Year	Nominated	
2020	Freedom on Sale	Anděl Awards	Group of the Year	Nominated	
