= Ahn Trio =

South Korean-American classical piano trio

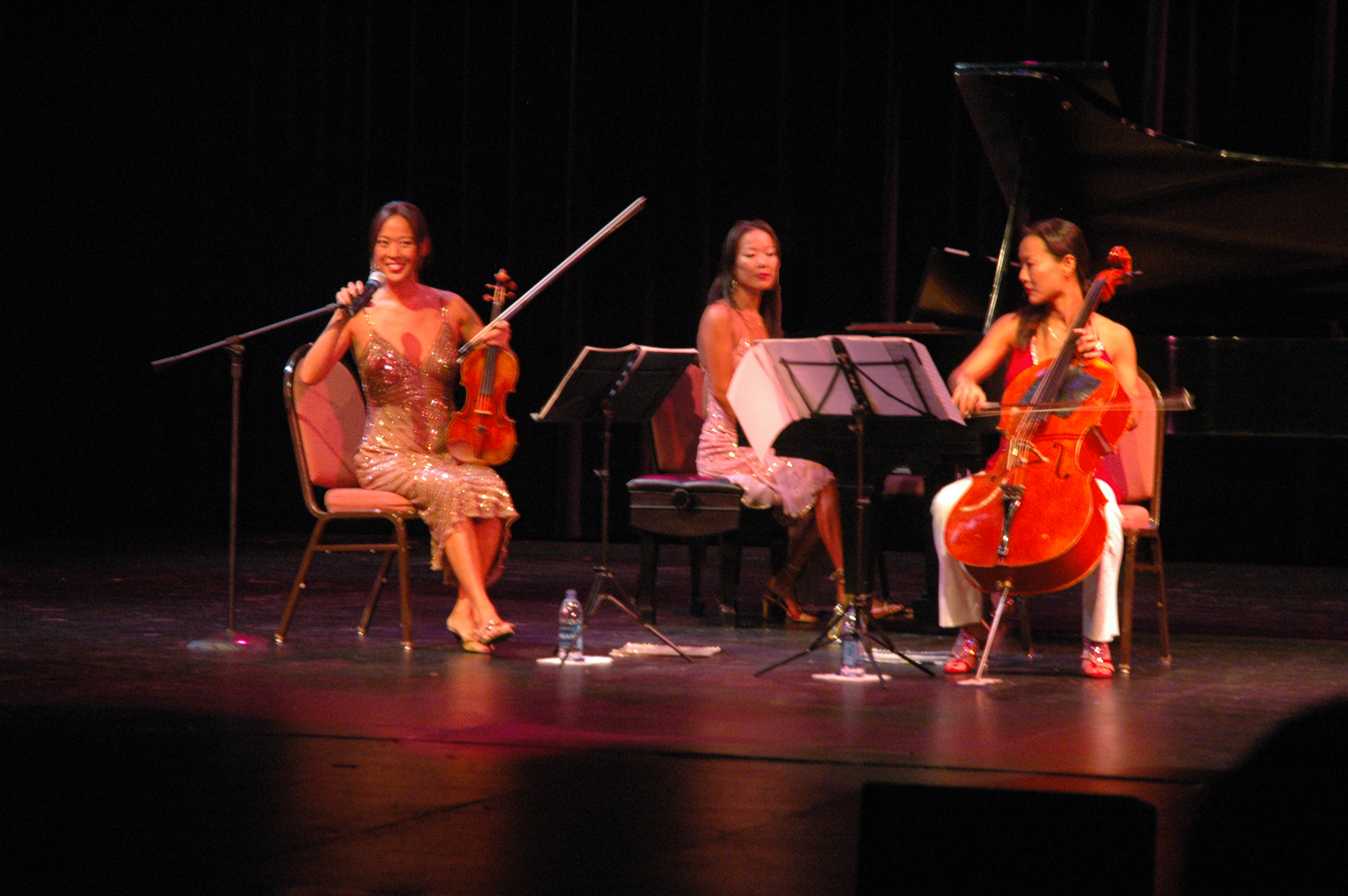

Background information
- Origin: New York City
- Genres: Classical, crossover, alternative rock
- Years active: 1989–present
- Labels: Sony Masterworks, EMI Classics
- Members: Maria Ahn; Lucia Ahn; Angella Ahn
- Website: www.ahntrio.com

The Ahn Trio is a classical piano trio composed of three sisters: Angella (violin), Lucia (piano), and Maria (cello) Ahn; Lucia and Maria are twins. Born in Seoul, Korea, they moved to New York City in 1981, and began their training at the Juilliard School. The sisters formed a trio while they were earning their master's degrees at Juilliard. The Ahn Trio is known for its performance of new classical music, genre-crossing programming, and collaborations with other artists.

== Media recognition ==
The trio achieved widespread recognition in the United States in 1987, when Time magazine featured them in a cover story about Asian-American "Whiz Kids". Since then, the trio has appeared in magazines multiple times, acknowledging that they seek to "get in the mainstream magazines as classical artists" in order to promote classical music's image. In 2003, they were selected by People magazine as three of the "50 Most Beautiful People" and have been featured in Vogue, GQ, and in ads for Gap and Anne Klein. They have been photographed by photographers Arthur Elgort, Ellen von Unwerth, and Walter Chin. The trio is often noted for their attractive appearance and fashion choices.

== Repertoire and collaborations ==
The Ahn Trio performs a diverse set of genres, ranging from new classical music to arrangements of popular songs. In addition to recognized works of the classical piano trio repertoire, such as that found on their first two albums (one of which, Dvořák, Suk, Shostakovich: Piano Trios, earned them a German Echo award) the sisters have performed arrangements of popular music (including songs by David Bowie and the Doors) and have commissioned works by composers including Michael Nyman, Mark O'Connor, Roberto Carnevale, and Ronn Yedidia.

The Ahn Trio's collaborations include an acoustic project with alternative rock band Tata Bojs, with whom they performed live at the Czech Grammys and recorded an album, smetana, and performances with the David Parsons Dance Company. They appeared on MTV's "Unplugged" with Bryan Adams, which inspired the title of their album Ahn-Plugged. "Ahn-Plugged" has also been used by the trio as a term for their commissioning and performing new works.

Lullaby For My Favorite Insomniac features collaborations with vocalists Susie Suh and Ema Brabcová and with DJs Tao of Sound, DJ Spooky, Superdrive, and Ra.D. for four remix tracks on the album.

== Performances and appearances ==
The Ahn Trio performs frequently throughout the United States, and also gives workshops and master classes at middle schools, high schools, and colleges, seeking to bring new audiences to classical music. Their performances often include visually appealing staging and programs that are announced and discussed from the stage by the trio.

Maria Ahn recorded guest cello parts for the album April Rain by Dutch symphonic metal band Delain. The record came out in March 2009.

In December 2010, the Ahn Trio appeared in the TED Conference as part of the TEDWomen series, performing Skylife by David Balakrishnan and Oblivion by Astor Piazzolla.

Their recording of "The Heart Asks Pleasure First" by Michael Nyman, from their album Lullaby For My Favorite Insomniac, appeared in So You Think You Can Dance in the show's final episode of season 8 on August 10, 2011.

The Ahn Trio performed at the White House State Dinner honoring South Korean President Lee Myung-bak on October 13, 2011.

== Discography ==
Year	Album details	Notes
1995	Paris Rio: Released: April 12, 1995; Label: Chesky	Villa-Lobos: Piano Trio in C Minor; Ravel: Piano Trio in A Minor
1999	Dvořák, Suk, Shostakovich: Piano Trios: Released: January 12, 1999; Label: EMI Classics	Won German ECHO award; Dvořák: Piano Trio in E Minor, Op. 90 ("Dumky"); Suk: Elegie in D-flat Major, Op. 23; Shostakovich: Piano Trio No. 2 in E Minor, Op. 67
2000	Ahn-Plugged: Released: August 15, 2000; Label: EMI Classics	Composers featured: Ástor Piazzolla, Michael Nyman, Kenji Bunch, Pat Metheny, Eric Ewazen, Leonard Bernstein, David Bowie.; Guest Performers: Matthew Gold (percussion) and Brian Resnick (percussion)
2002	Groovebox: Released: October 22, 2002; Label: EMI Classics	Composers featured: Ástor Piazzolla, Michael Nyman, Kenji Bunch, The Doors, Maurice Jarre, Ronn Yedidia
2008	Lullaby for My Favorite Insomniac: Released: April 1, 2008; Label: Sony Classical	Composers featured: Ástor Piazzolla, Michael Nyman, David Bowie, Pat Metheny, Richard Rodgers, Kenji Bunch, Ronn Yedidia, Terry Gilkyson, J.Y. Park, Susie Suh; Guest Artists: Susie Suh (vocals), Ema Brabcová (vocals), and remixes by Tao of Sound, DJ Spooky, Superdrive and Ra.D.; Self-produced by the Ahn Trio's production company, L.A.M.P. (Lucia Angella Maria Productions)
2008	smetana: Released: November 8, 2008; Label: Warner Bros.	Collaborative project with Czech band Tata Bojs
2017	Blue: Released: April 22, 2017; Label: Ahn Trio Music	
