= David Stypka =

Czech singer and journalist (1979–2021)

- Born: David Stypka; 21 July 1979; Frýdek-Místek, Czechoslovakia
- Died: 10 January 2021 (aged 41) Czech Republic
- Genres: pop rock; jazz rock
- Occupations: Singer, journalist
- Instruments: guitar; vocals
- Years active: 1995–2021
- Formerly of: David Stypka and Bandjeez
- Website: davidstypka.cz

David Stypka (21 July 1979 – 10 January 2021) was a Czech singer known for his performances in the band David Stypka and Bandjeez.

== Biography ==
Stypka came from Dobrá near Frýdek-Místek. After graduating from a grammar school in Frýdek, he was a journalist in the regional press, and also briefly worked at a candle shop and was a salesman at local festivals. After years of journalistic work, he became a graphic artist and typesetter. He had long collaborated with the magazine Pěstounství (single-parentship). He was single, with three children.

In the summer of 2019, Stypka was diagnosed with pancreatic cancer. He died on 10 January 2021, at the age of 41 from complications associated with COVID-19 during the COVID-19 pandemic in the Czech Republic.
