= Patrola Šlapeto =

Czech folk and cabaret band

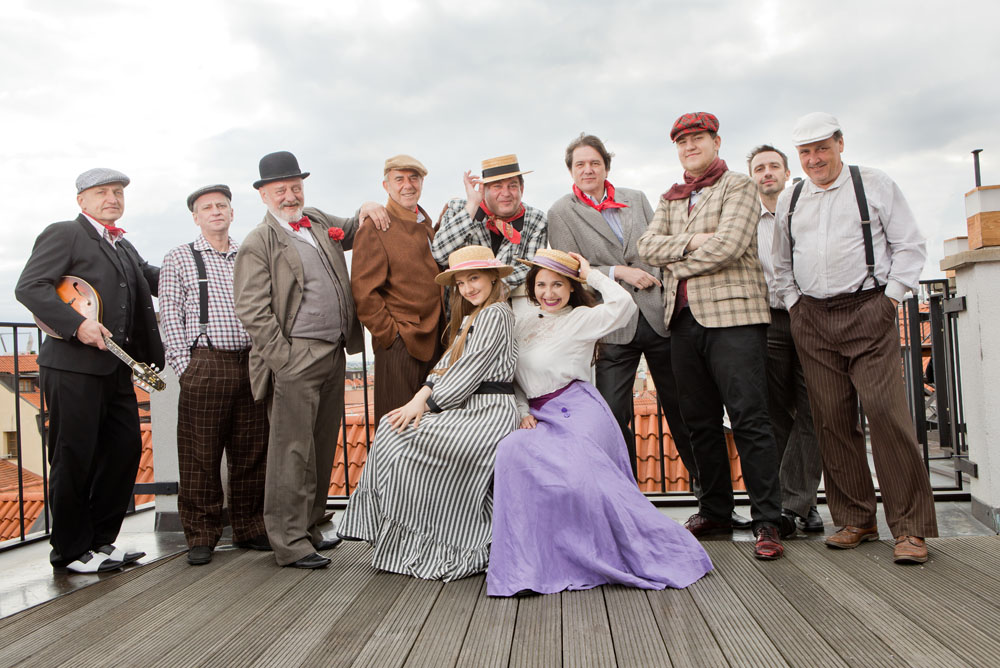
- Patrola Šlapeto in 2017

Background information
- Origin: Prague, Czechia
- Genres: Folk; cabaret; pub
- Years active: 2005–present
- Spinoff of: Šlapeto; Patrola
- Members: Radan Dolejš; Karel Hoza; Tomáš Jelínek; Pavel Fišar; Milan Černý; Milan Jakeš; Otakar Litomiský
- Website: patrola-slapeto.cz

Patrola Šlapeto is a Czech folk/cabaret/pub band formed in Prague in 2005 by Radan Dolejš and Karel Hoza as a merger of two previous bands, Šlapeto (Note: šlape to may be roughly translated as "it's going well".) (1989–2001) and Patrola (2004–2005).

== History ==
=== Šlapeto: 1989–2001 ===
In 1989, guitarist Radan Dolejš formed the band Šlapeto together with Jiří Pánek (double bass) and Ivo Zelenka (accordion), and they began playing "old Prague" (Note: "Old Prague song" (Czech: staropražská písnička, staropražská píseň) is a category of urban folk songs in the spirit of 19th-century Prague pubs, associated with the name of Karel Hašler, who wrote a large number of them.) folk and pub songs, soon adding violinist Jan Jarda Janecký, second accordionist Josef Horváth, and vocalist Otakar Litomiský. They regularly performed on Charles Bridge, where they were noticed by actor and writer Jiří Suchý, who invited them to play at his theatre, Semafor. The band then had the opportunity to perform abroad, travelling to Switzerland. They released their debut album, Ručičky nebojte se, in 1992, and were subsequently signed to Monitor. They followed up with Hašlerky in 1993, recorded in the Netherlands, and travelled to Western Europe, the UAE, Canada, and the United States, singing in Czech, English, and German. They also collaborated with other artists, including Zdeněk Svěrák, Pavlína Filipovská, Petr Nárožný, Dagmar Veškrnová, Jiřina Jirásková, Jiřina Bohdalová, Jiří Lábus, Viktor Preiss, and Helena Vondráčková, among others. The band went on to release one album each year until 2001, at which point, Dolejš left, complaining of a limited repertoire of songs to record.

=== Patrola and Patrola Šlapeto: 2004–present ===
Dolejš played with Robert Papoušek for some time, and the duo created the band Patrola in 2004, which was intended as a tribute to songwriter and lyricist Karel Hašler, upon the 125th anniversary of his birth. The two groups merged a year later, becoming Patrola Šlapeto.

== Band members ==
- Radan Dolejš – guitar, vocals
- Karel Hoza – accordion, vocals
- Tomáš Jelínek – mandolin, vocals
- Pavel Fišar
- Milan Černý – double bass
- Milan Jakeš – violin, vocals
- Otakar Litomiský – vocals

== Discography ==
Studio albums

- Máš-li kapičku štěstí... as Robert Papoušek a Patrola (2001)
- Zpráva o stavu pražských hospod as Patrola (2003)
- Všechny naše holky as Robert Papoušek & Patrola (2003)
- Karel Hašler 125 Patrola and guests (Double CD, 2004)
- Máme v kleci papouška (2005)
- Četnické (mini-album, 2007)
- Hašlerky (mini-album, 2010)
- Praha srdce Evropy (CD + DVD, 2013)
- Mým domovem ztichlá je putyka (2014)
- Hezká vzpomínka (2016)
- Chytila Patrola... (CD + DVD, 2017)

Live albums

- Patrola Šlapeto živě (2010)
- Živě v Semaforu (DVD, 2010)
- Koncert pro Patrika Patrola Šlapeto and guests (2014)

Compilations

- Ta naše písnička česká as Šlapeto, Patrola (Double CD, 2008)
- Ručičky nebojte se (CD + DVD, 2009)
