= Lucerna Music Bar =

Music club in Prague, Czech Republic

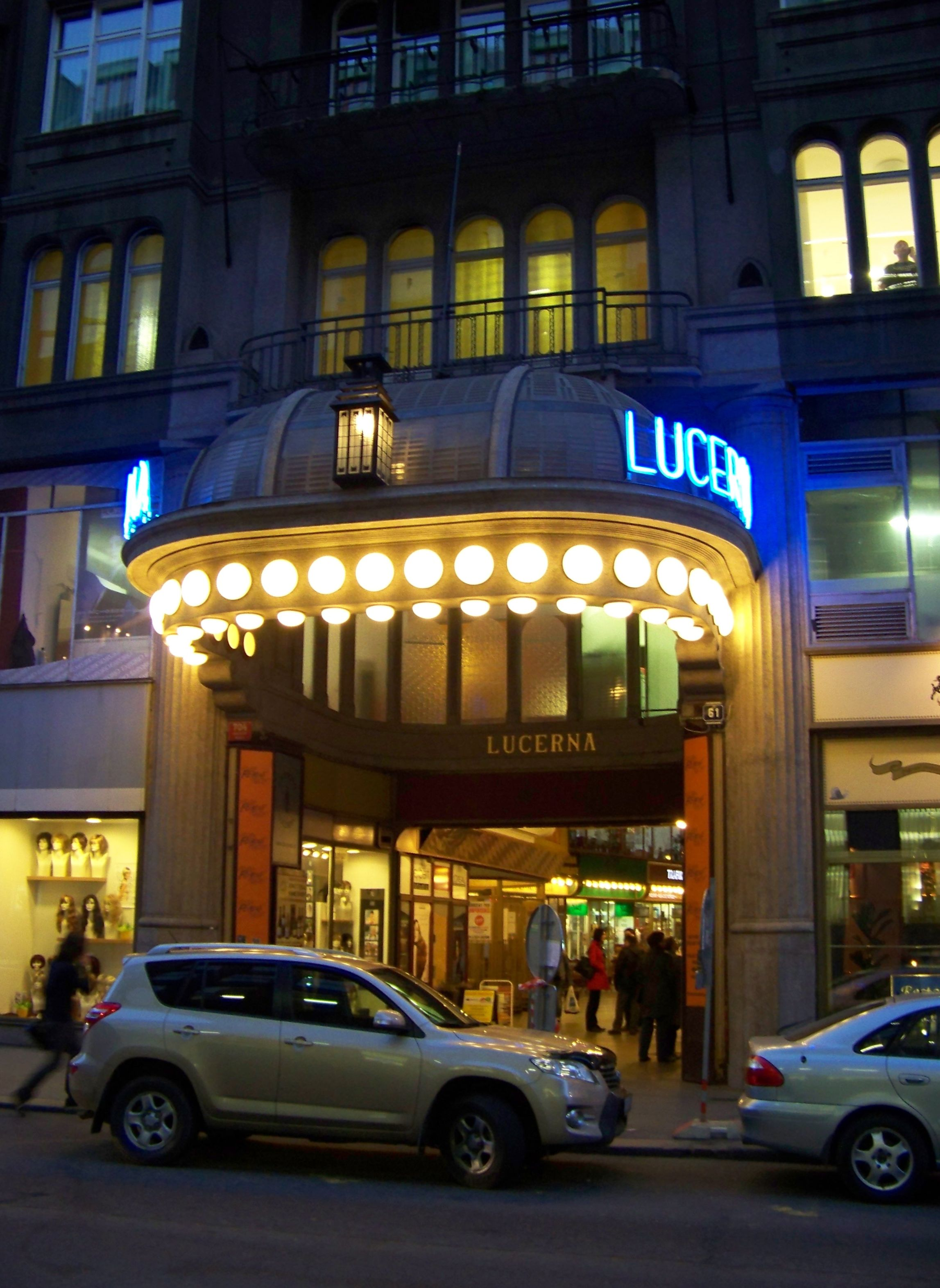
- Štěpánská street entrance of Lucerna Palace
- Interactive map of Lucerna Music Bar
- Address: Štěpánská 704/61
- Location: Prague, Czech Republic
- Coordinates: 50°4′52.77″N 14°25′31.57″E
- Owner: Henry LoConti Sr.
- Capacity: 800
- Type: Music venue
- Event: Various

Construction
- Opened: 24 October 1995

Website
- musicbar.cz

Lucerna Music Bar is a concert club in Prague, Czech Republic. It is housed within Lucerna Palace.

Lucerna Music Bar is one of the stages used in the Prague International Jazz Festival and the AghaRTA Prague Jazz Festival. It was used for the Václav Havel Tribute Concert. The venue, opened in 1995, has played an important role in giving exposure to many Czech bands. Today, it holds discos on Friday and Saturday nights, and during the week, it mainly hosts live music. The name Lucerna means "lantern" in Czech.

== Location ==
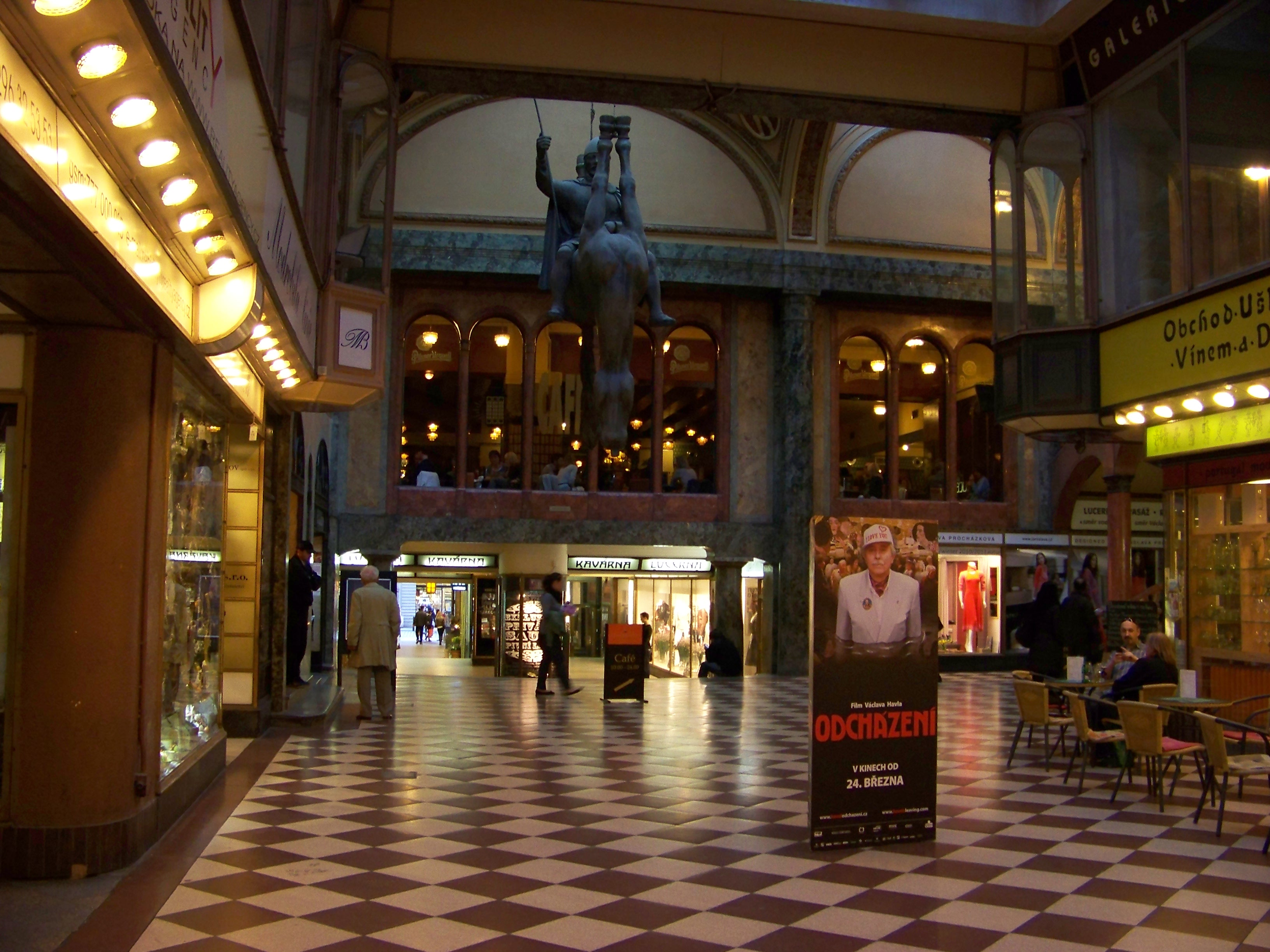
Inside the Lucerna Palace galleria—Lucerna Music Bar is down the hall on the left.

Lucerna Music Bar is housed in the Lucerna Palace, located inside a pedestrian walkway, or "passage", in architectural terms, that connects Vodičkova and Štěpánská streets near historic Wenceslas Square, in the New Town quarter of Prague. The building is a multilevel open-air galleria that also houses the Lucerna Theatre, a formal concert hall, in addition to an assortment of shops, restaurants, coffee shops, and bars. The building is protected as a national cultural monument.

== Cultural context ==
In 1964, first Prague International Jazz Festival was held in the hall, and the following year, Louis Armstrong performed there. Until 1989, Czechoslovakia was under the rule of a communist government. Jazz musicians, artists, and intellectuals are credited with promoting the democratic ideals that shaped the Velvet Revolution, which overthrew this regime. Charter 77, a human rights manifesto, was written in response to the arrest of the band Plastic People of the Universe. In 1979, Václav Havel was imprisoned for activities on behalf of the charter and the Jazz Section was targeted by the government for their work. Five members of the Jazz Section died in prison under suspicious circumstances. In 1989, Communism fell in Czechoslovakia. Havel, a playwright and strong patron of the Czechoslovak music scene, became the nation's first post-communist elected president. Lucerna Music Bar was the site of the Václav Havel Tribute Concert held in the former president's honor, upon his death in 2011.

Today, the venue holds discos on Friday and Saturday nights, and during the week, it mainly hosts live music.
