= Voice of Baceprot =

Indonesian thrash metal band

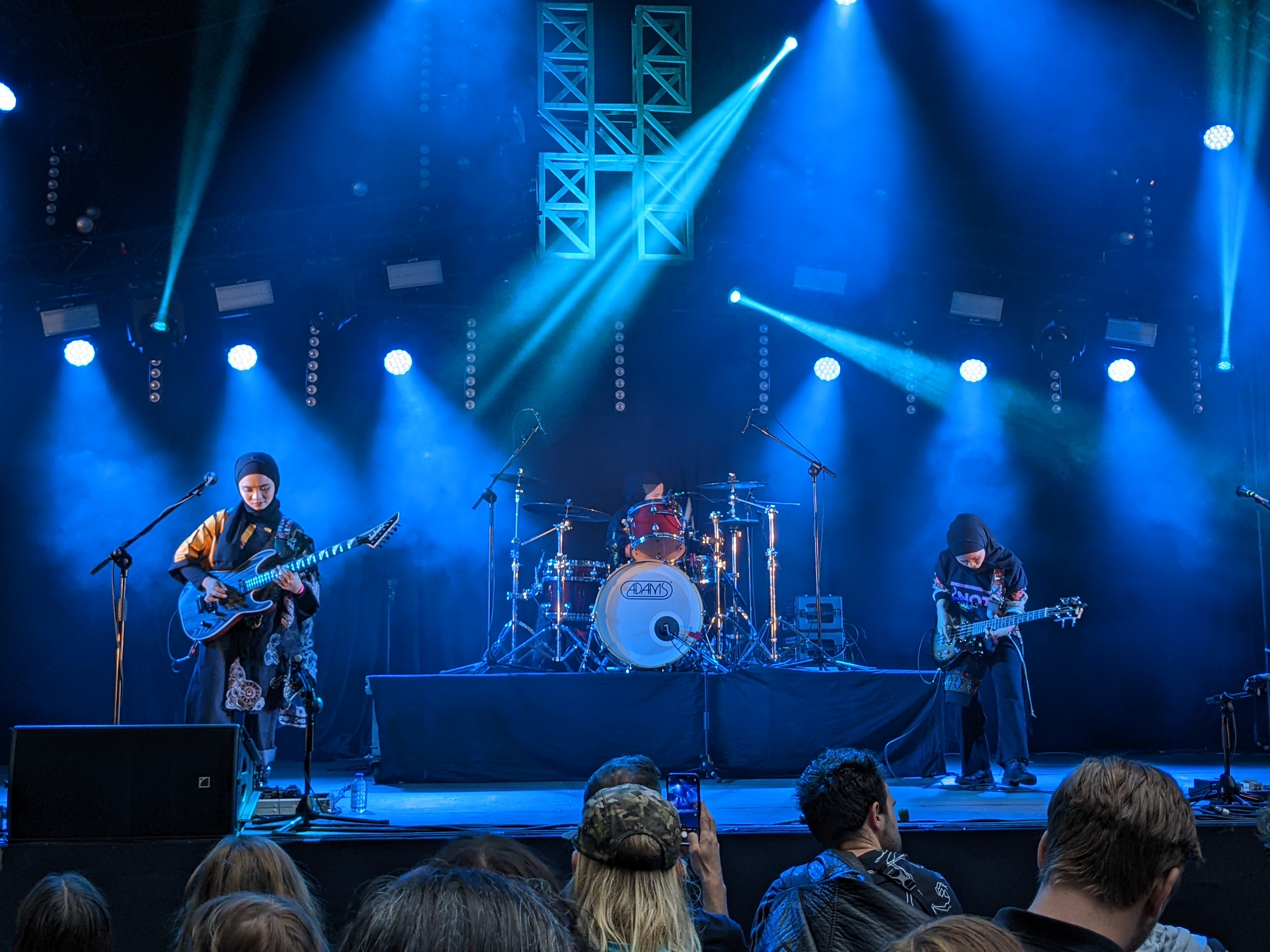
- Voice of Baceprot performing in 2022

Background information
- Origin: Garut, Indonesia
- Genres: Nu metal; funk metal; thrash metal; progressive metal; rap metal
- Years active: 2014–present
- Members: Firda Marsya Kurnia; Euis Siti Aisyah; Widi Rahmawati
- Website: voiceofbaceprot.com

Voice of Baceprot (Sundanese pronunciation: [ba.t͡ʃə.prot]; bah-che-prot, lit. 'loudness/noise')—often abbreviated as VOB—are an Indonesian all-female metal trio formed in Garut, West Java, in 2014. The group consists of Firda Marsya Kurnia (vocals and guitar), Widi Rahmawati (bass), and Euis Siti Aisyah (drums). They sing in English as well as Sundanese. The word baceprot means "noisy" in Sundanese. It is meant to represent the band's musical style.

== History ==
=== Formation ===
VOB formed in the West Javan town of Singajaya, Garut, in 2014, after the members, who were school friends, were introduced to heavy metal by their counselor, who saw music as an outlet for their proactive, rebellious nature, which had gotten them in trouble with teachers. They generated numerous views on YouTube with a cover of a Rage Against the Machine song in 2015. The trio continued to produce videos of cover songs by artists such as Red Hot Chili Peppers, Metallica, and Slipknot. The band presented a seemingly contradictory image, with their heavy style of playing, in contrast to their modest Islamic attire, including the hijab, worn by all three members. This has caused them to receive criticism from some conservative Muslims in their hometown of Garut. They have also received support, however, from various quarters.

All three women had been learning to play musical instruments at school and were encouraged by their theatre coach to sign up for band competitions. Their coach went on to become their manager as well as lyricist.

=== First single and recognition ===
In 2018, VOB signed a deal with Jakarta-based booking agency Amity Asia. Not long after, they released their debut single, "School Revolution". The single gained the band significant traction, and they received a number of invitations to perform at international music festivals.

When American rock band Guns N' Roses played at the Gelora Bung Karno Stadium in Jakarta in November 2018, guitarist Slash invited the trio to meet him backstage.

They received further endorsements on social media from Rage Against the Machine guitarist Tom Morello and Red Hot Chili Peppers bassist Flea, as well as Living Colour guitarist Vernon Reid.

=== Second single and live EP ===
In early 2021, VOB returned to the studio to work on "God, Allow Me (Please) to Play Music", a response to the conservative criticism they faced. It was their first original single in three years. The song was released on 17 August 2021, preceded by an EP of five live tracks, titled The Other Side of Metalism (Live Session).

=== US tour and debut album ===
In June 2023, the band announced an 11-stop US tour, beginning in August of that year. They also announced the upcoming release of their debut album, entitled Retas, on 13 July 2023, via 12Wired. The band issued the first single from the album, "What's the Holy (Nobel) Today?", on 15 June.

In June 2024, VOB became the first-ever Indonesian musical act to play at the Glastonbury Festival.

== Band members ==
- Firda Marsya Kurnia – vocals, guitar
- Euis Siti Aisyah – drums
- Widi Rahmawati – bass
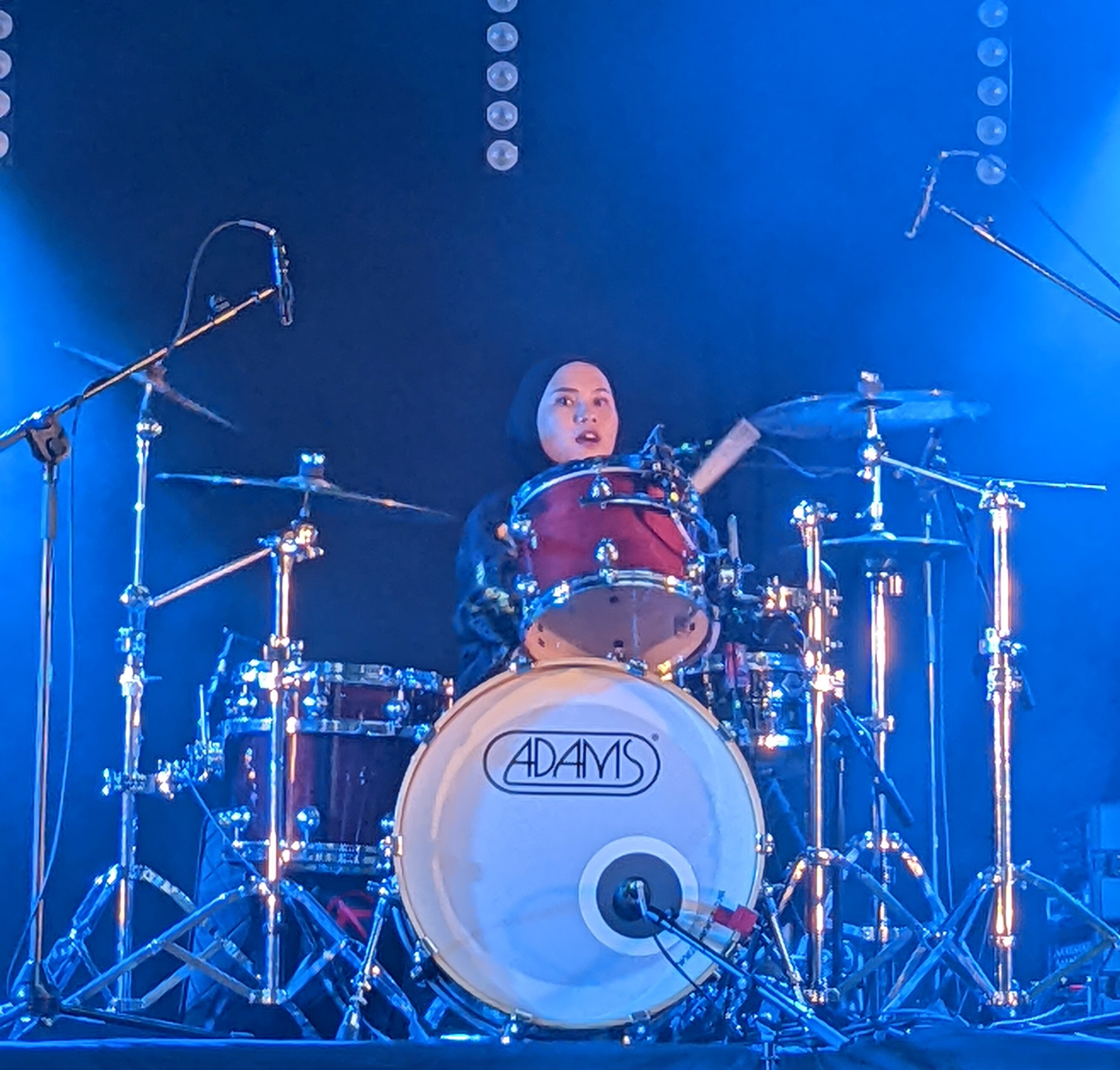
Drummer Euis Siti Aisyah

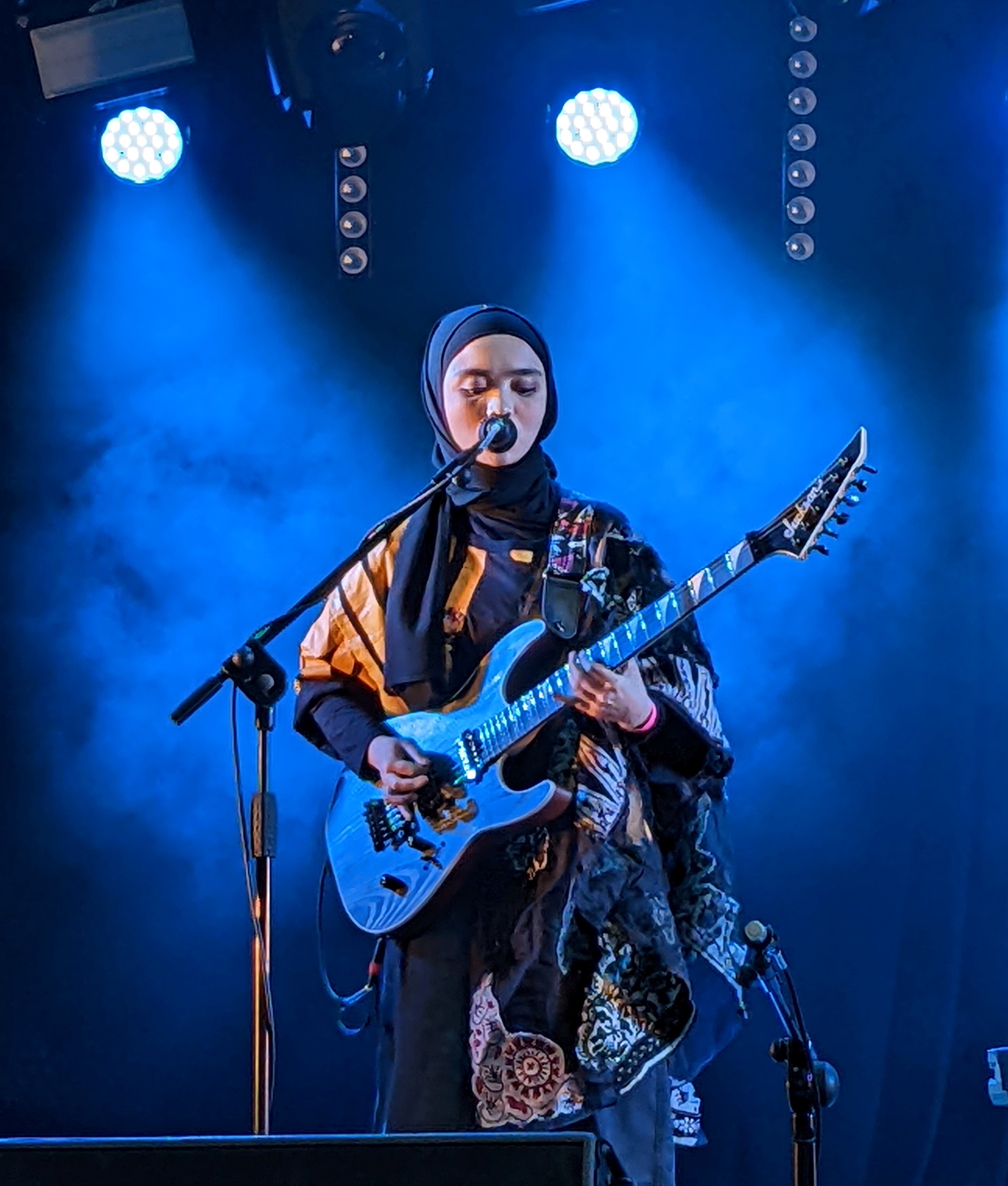
Vocalist/guitarist Firda Marsya Kurnia

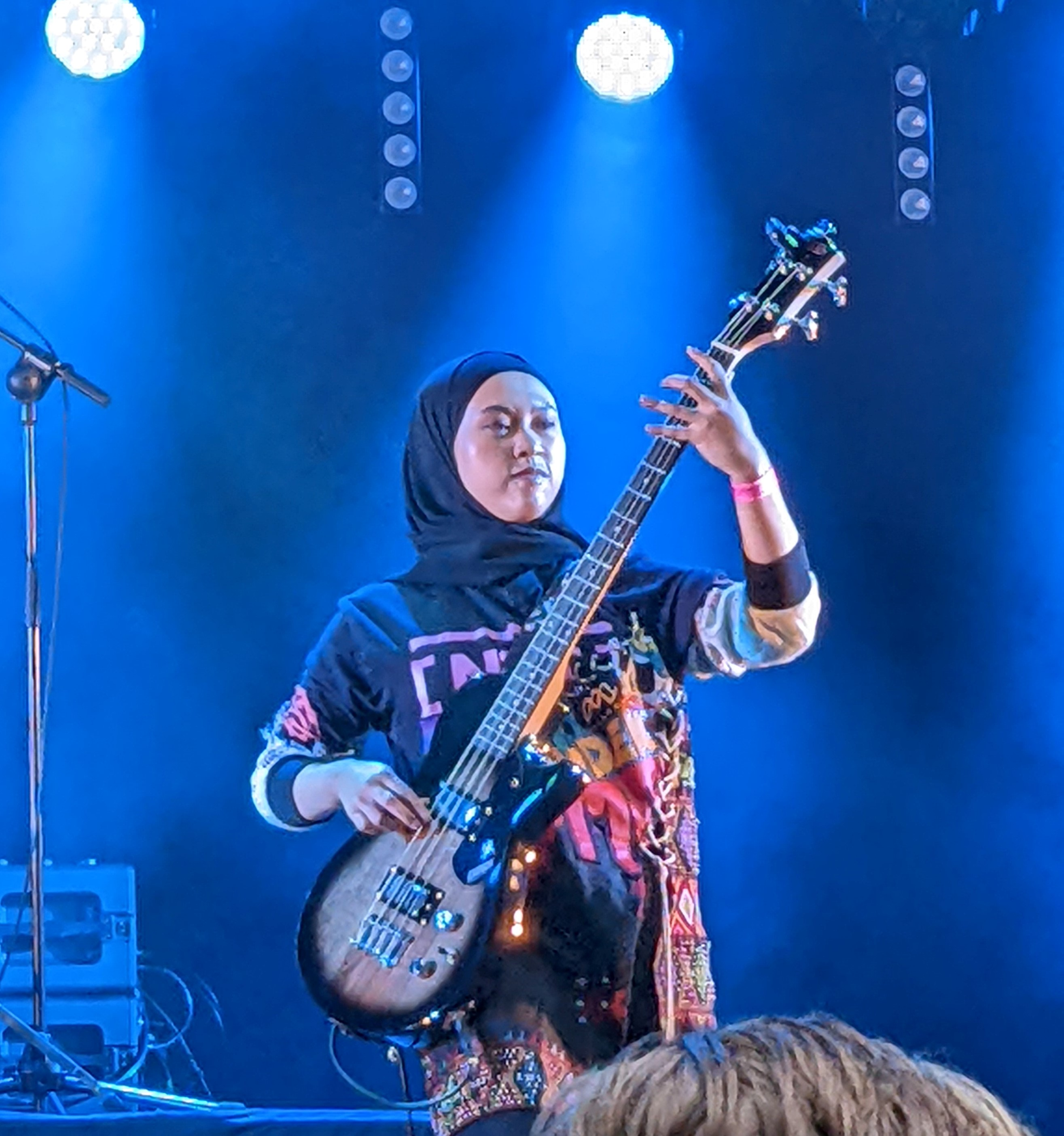
Bass guitarist Widi Rahmawati

== Discography ==
Albums

- Retas (2023)

EPs

- The Other Side of Metalism (Live Session) (2021)
- Transisi (2025)

Singles

- "School Revolution" (2018)
- "God, Allow Me (Please) to Play Music" (2021)
- "[NOT] Public Property" (2022)
- "PMS – Perempuan Merdeka Seutuhnya" (2022)
- "What's the Holy (Nobel) Today?" (2023)
- "Rumah Tanah Tidak Dijual" (2024)
- "Mighty Island" (2025)

== Awards and nominations ==
Year	Award	Category	Nominee(s)	Result	Ref.
2022	Anugerah Musik Indonesia	Best Duo/Group Rock Collaboration	"God Allow Me (Please) to Play Music"	Won	
2023	Anugerah Musik Indonesia	Best Duo/Group Rock Collaboration	"PMS"	Nominated	
2025	28th Anugerah Musik Indonesia	Best Duo/Group Rock Collaboration	Transisi	Nominated	
2025	28th Anugerah Musik Indonesia	Best Rock Album	Transisi	Nominated	
