= Tata Bojs =

Czech pop rock band

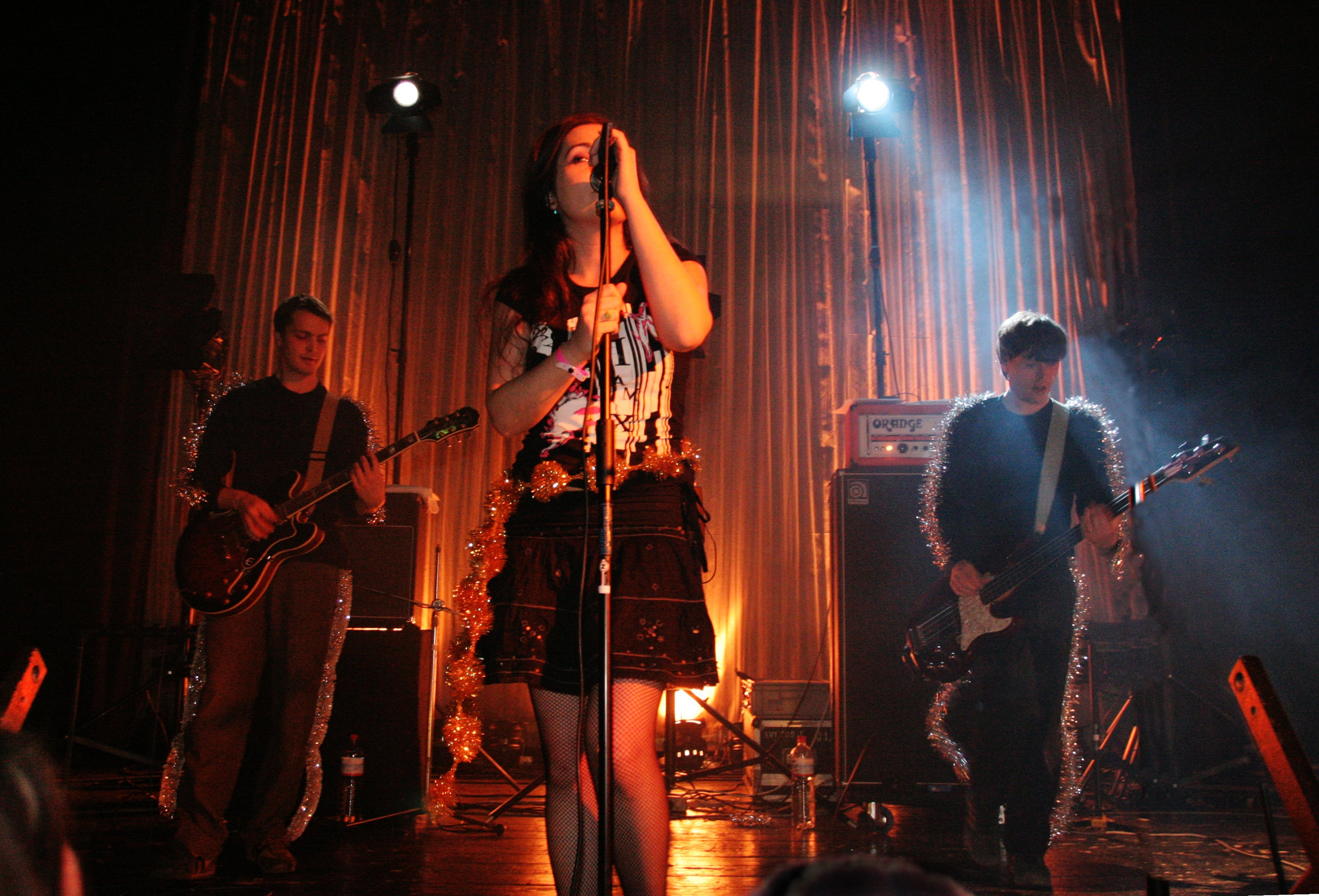
- Tata Bojs on stage (with Klára Nemravová)

Background information
- Origin: Hanspaulka, Prague, Czechia
- Years active: 1988–present
- Label: Supraphon
- Members: Milan Cais; Mardoša; Vladimír Bár; Dušan Neuwerth; Matěj Belko
- Website: www.tatabojs.cz

Tata Bojs is a Czech pop rock band, formed in 1988 by bass-player Mardoša and drummer/singer Milan Cais. The band plays electronic pop music. The band is famous for its creative lyrics and word play. The current line-up of the band includes guitarist Vladimír Bár, producer Dušan Neuwerth on guitar and Matěj Belko on piano, guitar and keyboards. The band won the award for Best Group at the 2004 Anděl Awards.

== Discography ==
=== Albums ===
- 1991 Šagali Šagáli
- 1995 Ladovo album
- 1997 Jaro/Divnosti
- 1997 Ukončete nás
- 1998 Nekonečná stanice
- 2000 Futuretro
- 2001 Termixes
- 2002 Biorytmy
- 2002 Attention!
- 2003 Šagalí léta 89-97
- 2004 Nanoalbum
- 2007 Kluci kde ste?
- 2008 smetana (with Ahn Trio)
- 2011 Ležatá osmička (∞)
- 2013 Hity a city
- 2015 A/B
- 2017 Tata Bojs & SOČR Live
- 2020 Jedna nula
- 2022 OnLIVE
- 2025 EP25
- 2026 V původním snění

=== DVD ===
- 2005 Nanotour
- 2012 Ležatá Letná

=== Books ===
- 2004 Nanobook

== Awards ==
Anděl Awards

- 2004 Best Group
