= Robert Balzar =

Czech jazz bassist and composer (born 1962)

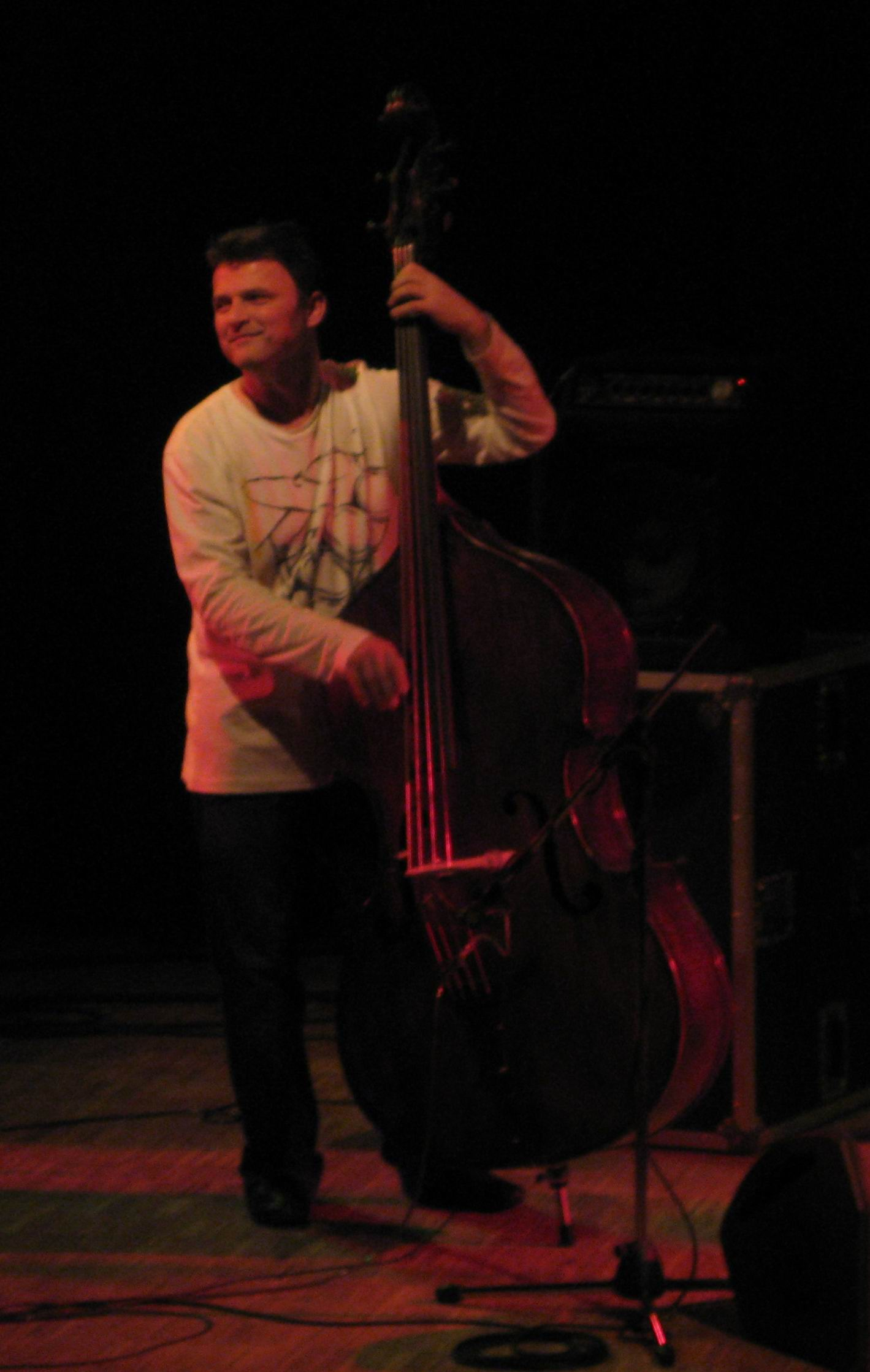
Robert Balzar, 2009

Robert Balzar (born 11 May 1962) is a Czech jazz bassist and composer who was born in Náchod.

Robert Balzar studied bass at academy of music in Brno. After working with various groups, he founded Robert Balzar Trio in 1996. The collaboration with American jazz guitar player John Abercrombie brought him international attention.

He worked together with Joe Newman, Benny Bailey, Tony Scott, Benny Golson, Wynton Marsalis, Lew Tabackin, Sinan Alimanović, Tony Lakatos, Victor Lewis, the Hal Galper Trio, Craig Handy and others.

== Awards ==
Robert Balzar and his Trio received several awards:

- 1998: Album Travelling, best Czech CD of the year during the Czech Radio Jazz Test
- 1999: Robert Balzar, best Czech bassist of the year
- 2000: Album Alone, best Czech CD of the year
- 2000: Robert Balzar Trio, best Czech group of the year

== Discography of Robert Balzar Trio ==
- 1998: Travelling
- 2000: Alone
- 2005: Overnight
- 2008: Tales, with great american Guitarist John Abercrombie
- 2010: Theyories, with vocalist with Dan Bárta
- 2013: Discover Who We Are
- 2014: Vuja Dé
- 2016: DVD One Day
- 2023: Album Conversation
