= Dan Bárta =

Czech singer (born 1969)

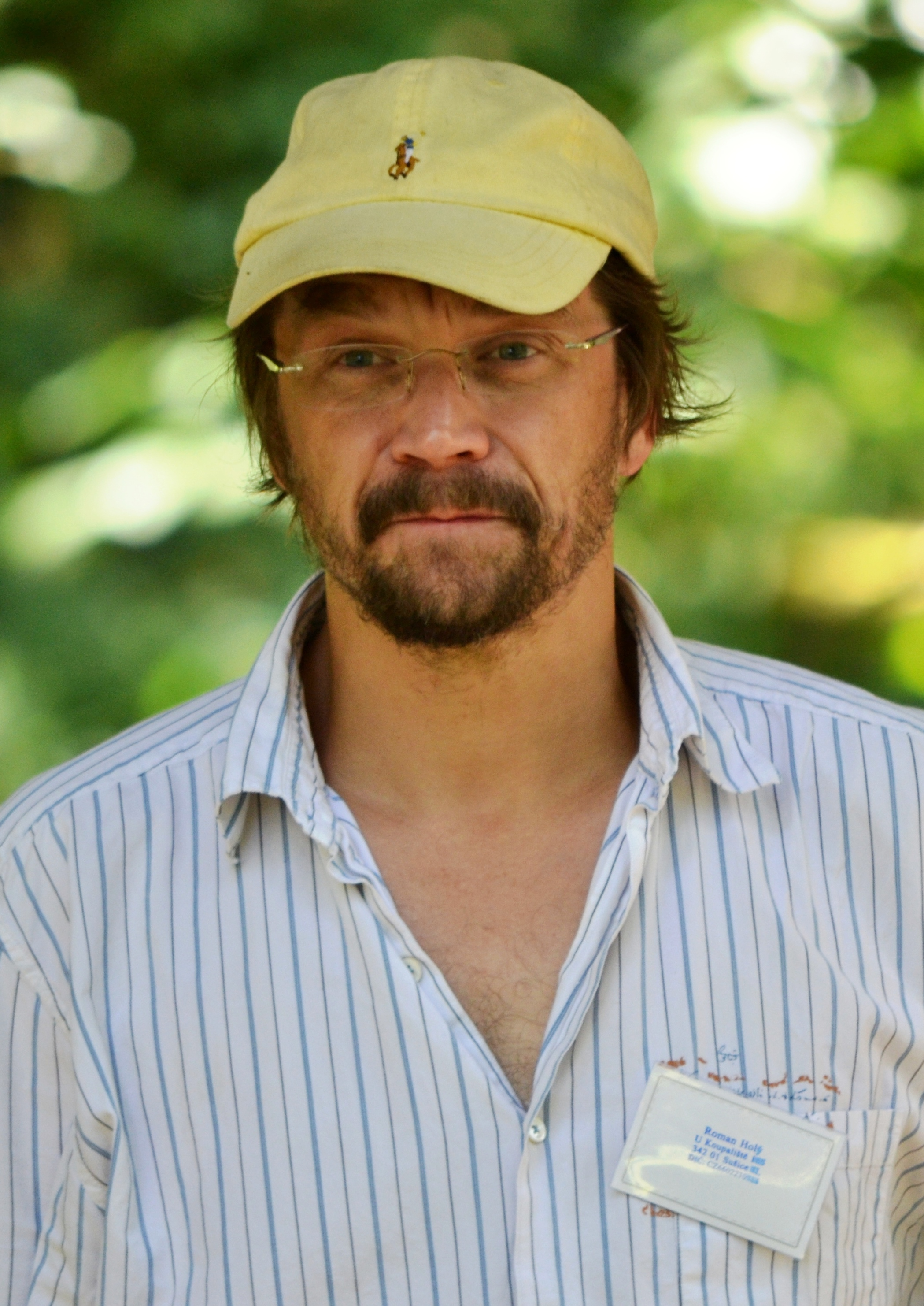
- Dan Bárta (2013)

Background information
- Born: 14 December 1969 (age 56); Karlovy Vary, Czechoslovakia
- Genres: Jazz, rock
- Occupation: Singer
- Years active: 1990–present

Dan Bárta (born 14 December 1969 in Karlovy Vary) is a Czech rock singer. He's a founding member of Alice (1990-1997). Later he was a member of the short-lived Sexy Dancers. He released several solo albums and albums with his band Illustratosphere. Since 1994, he has been member of J.A.R. He also starred in musicals.

== Discography ==
- Alice (1995)
- Dan Bárta &… (1999)
- Illustratosphere (2000)
- Entropicture (2003)
- Liberec LiveRec (2005)
- Retropicture Livě (2005)
- Animage (2008)
- Theyories (2010) – with Robert Balzar Trio
- Maratonika (2013)
