= Wanastowi Vjecy =

Czech rock band

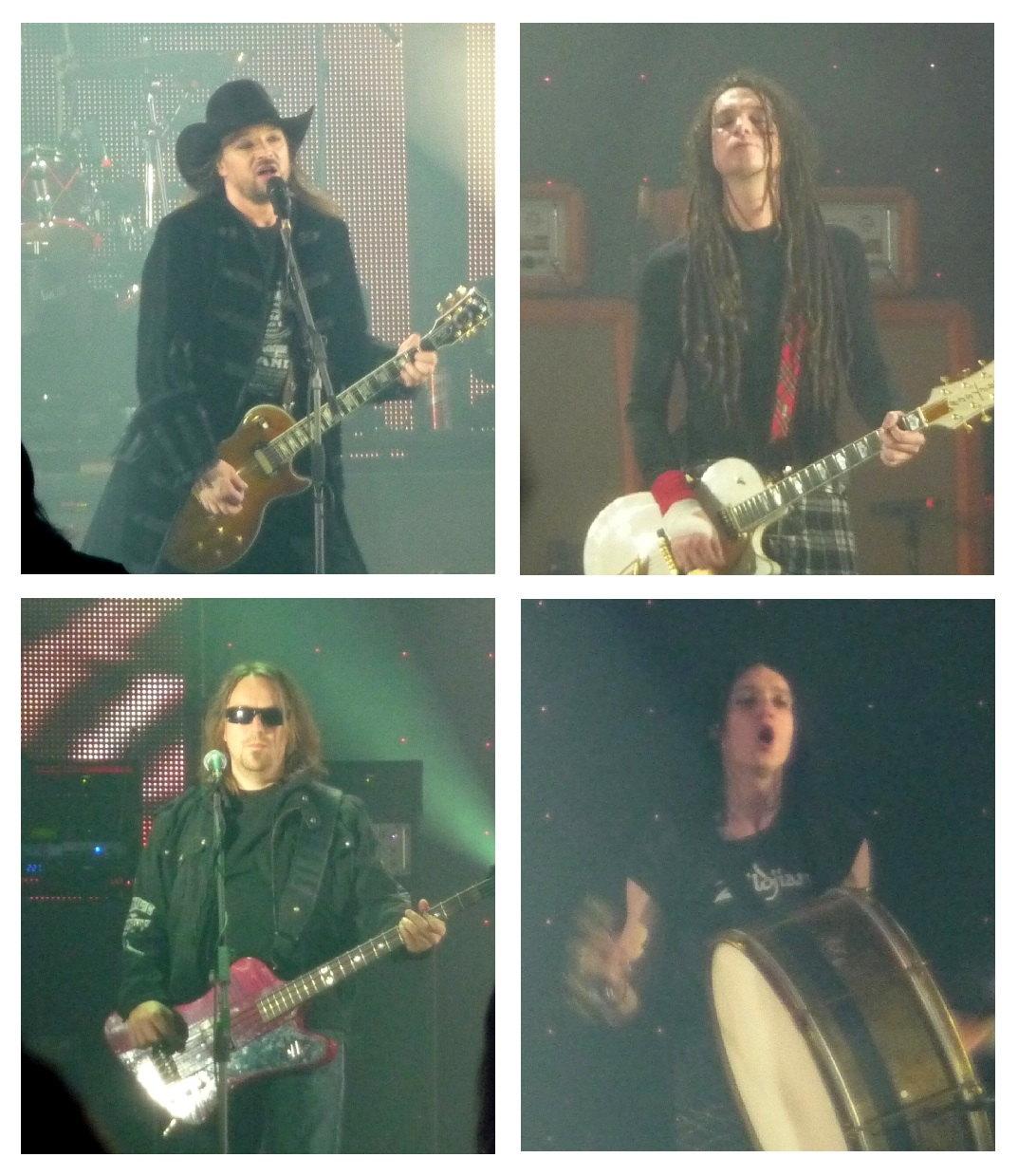
- Wanastowi Vjecy performing in 2012

Background information
- Origin: Prague, Czechoslovakia
- Genres: Rock; punk
- Years active: 1988–present
- Labels: Multisonic; Tommü Records; Popron Music; B&M Music; Sony BMG; Universal; WV; Pink Panther Media
- Spinoff of: Lucie
- Members: Robert Kodym; Tomáš Vartecký; Radek Havlíček; Štěpán Smetáček
- Past members: P.B.CH.; Martin Vajgl; Marek Kopecký; Adolf Vitáček; Ivan Polák
- Website: wanastowivjecy.cz

Wanastowi Vjecy is a Czech rock band formed in 1988 in Prague. The group consists of Robert Kodym on vocals and guitar, Štěpán Smetáček on drums, Tomáš Vartecký on guitar, and Radek Havlíček on bass. They began as a punk band but settled into a mainstream rock sound by the early 1990s. Kodym and former member P.B.CH. were also in the band Lucie, led by David Koller, which they had formed together in 1985. The duo formed the core of Wanastowi Vjecy until 2010, when P.B.CH. left.

== History ==
Wanastowi Vjecy formed in 1988 as a studio project to record music for a forthcoming documentary about punk music in Prague. Their original lineup consisted of Kodym on guitar and vocals, Petr Břetislav Chovanec (more commonly known as P.B.CH.) on bass and vocals, and Adolf Vitáček on drums. They wrote four songs for the project, which were released on a 1990 punk compilation by various artists, titled Epidemie. Three of the tracks made it to the band's debut album, Tak mi to teda nandey, released in 1991.

The band's second album, Lži, sex & prachy, was released in 1992, followed by Divnoalbum, a compilation of remixes, live recordings, and instrumental compositions, in 1993. Lucie had been on a brief hiatus since 1992, and as they reformed the following year, Wanastowi Vjecy was shelved in turn.

The project returned in 1996 with the album Andělé. The following year saw the release of 333 stříbrnejch stříkaček.

Wanastowi Vjecy released their next album, Hračky, in April 2000, but it proved less successful than their earlier work. Due to their commitment to Lucie, the band did not do a tour for the record. In September 2001, they issued the compilation Ty nejlepší věci on the tenth anniversary of the release of their debut album.

In 2003, Kodym, P.B.CH., and drummer Martin Vajgl began preparing a new album, titled Torpédo, which came out in 2006. In 2007, an extensive concert tour was to take place, but due to problems with logistics and a change of management, only one show was held in London. The same year, the two-CD + DVD compilation Best of 20 let was released. Also in 2007, the band performed at Prague's Sazka Arena in celebration of their twenty-year anniversary, and this was followed by a concert tour.

The band then went on a two-year hiatus, and in 2010 announced the departure of founding member P.B.CH. The musician stated that he wanted to devote himself to his own projects as well as the creation of film music.

In 2011, the first Wanastowi Vjecy album without P.B.CH. was released, under the title Letíme na Wenuši.

In 2016, Wanastowi Vjecy released their eighth studio album, titled Alchymie.

In 2018, Lucie officially reformed in its best-known formation of Kodym, P.B.CH., Koller, and Dvořák after a 16-year hiatus, and released the album EvoLucie.

== Band members ==
Current

- Robert Kodym – vocals, guitar
- Štěpán Smetáček – drums
- Tomáš Vartecký – guitar
- Radek Havlíček – bass guitar

Past

- P.B.CH. – bass guitar
- Martin Vajgl – drums
- Marek Kopecký – drums
- Adolf Vitáček – drums
- Ivan Polák – drums

== Discography ==
=== Studio albums ===
- Tak mi to teda nandey (1991)
- Lži, sex & prachy (1992)
- Andělé (1996)
- 333 stříbrnejch stříkaček(1997)
- Hračky (2000)
- Torpédo (2006)
- Letíme na Wenuši (2011)
- Alchymie (2016)

=== Compilations ===
- Epidemie (1990)
- Divnoalbum (1993)
- Ty nejlepší věci (2001)
- Best of 20 let (2007)

=== Singles ===
- "Vlkodlak" (1997)
- "V princeznách" (1998)
- "Otevřená Zlomenina" (2006)
- "Velkej první letní den" (2007)

=== DVDs ===
- Best of Wanastowi Vjecy Tour: 20 let (2008)

=== Other appearances ===
- "Julie" Šest Křížků (Franta 2017) (František Černý, 2017) - with Lenka Dusilová
