= Oskar Petr =

Czech musician (1952–2026)

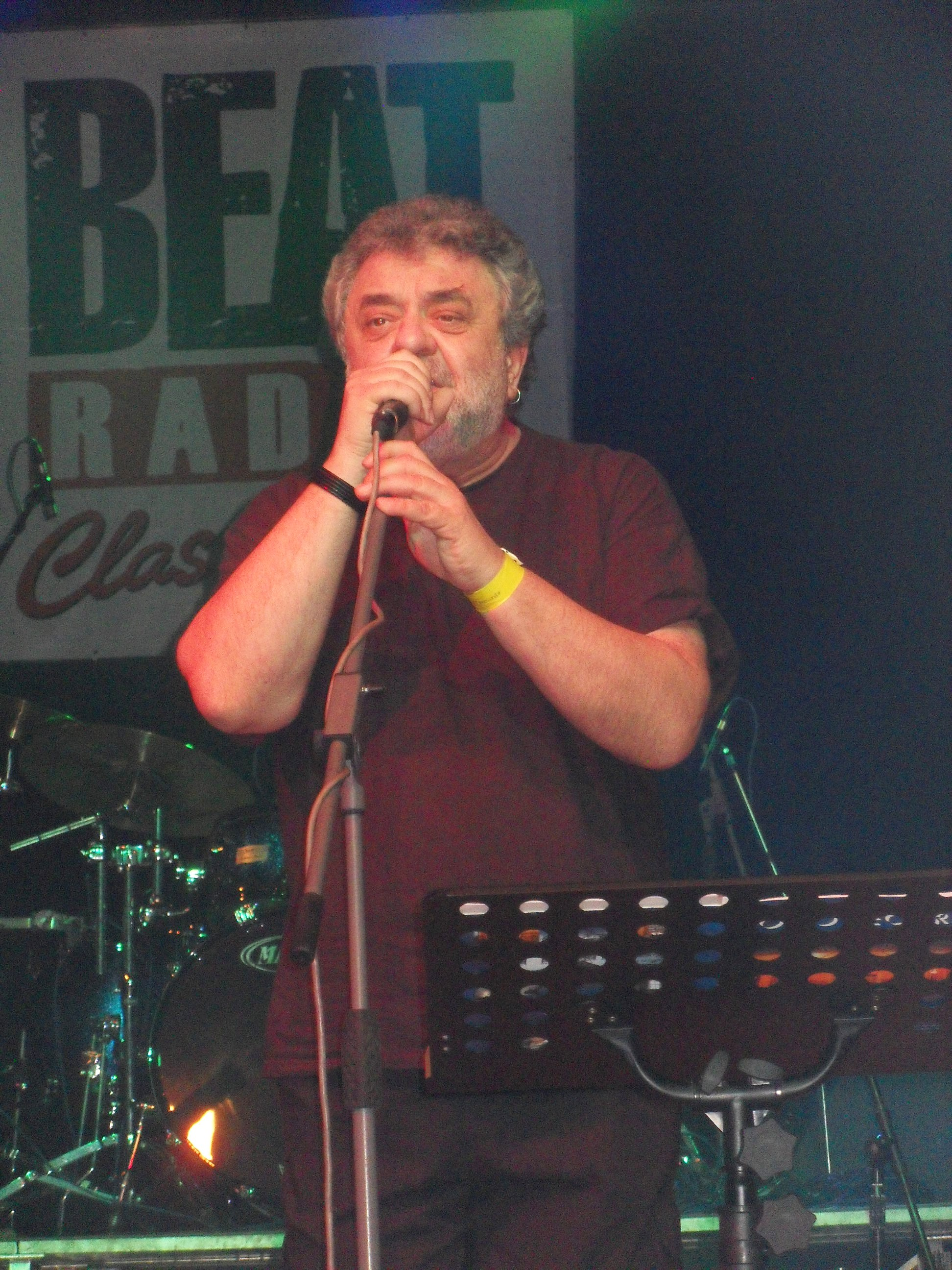
- Petr in 2011

Background information
- Born: 16 August 1952; Prague, Czechoslovakia
- Died: 29 April 2026 (aged 73)
- Genres: Rock; folk rock; pop
- Occupations: Musician; songwriter; composer
- Instruments: Vocals; guitar
- Years active: 1970s–2026
- Website: oskarpetr.cz

Oskar Petr (16 May 1952 – 29 April 2026) was a Czech composer, lyricist and singer, a member of the folk Association Šafrán, a founding member of the folk-rock band Marsyas, and a member of pianist Martin Kratochvíl's Jazz Q Group. From 1979 to 1993 he lived in emigration, briefly in West Germany, then in the United States in California, where he graduated from several schools, received citizenship and was engaged in painting, photojournalism and interior architecture.

== Career ==
The other aspect of his work was his role as a lyricist where he composed lyrics to songs such as "Hříšná těla, křídla motýlí" for the debut album of Aneta Langerová entitled Spousta andělů, "Chci zas v tobě spát" for the album of David Koller entitled David Koller or the song "Medvídek" for the band Lucie in their album entitled Větší než malé množstvo lásky, for which he won the Academy of Popular Music Award (Anděl) in the category of song of the year in 1999. The artist also worked with such performers as Lenka Dusilová, Anna K, Karel Gott, Kamil Střihavka, Leona Machálková, Dan Bárta, Bára Basiková as well as with the bands Pusa, Pražský výběr, Burma Jones and BSP.

Apart from working on musical pieces, he also composed music to films (including a song "Nevinná") to the film Účastníci zájezdu (2006) by Michal Viewegh.

Since 2016, he played with Ondřej Hejma and Kateřina Pelíšková in the trio Marush, inspired by band Marsyas. He released three solo albums, recently had been preparing another one, and was also supposed to participate in the comeback album of the group Lucie.

== Discography ==
=== The Marsyas band ===
- 1978: Marsyas

=== Solo albums ===
- 1994: Krev, bláto, slzy (blood, mud, tears)
- 2003: Fabrica Atomica (Fabrica Atomica)
- 2013: Jsme starý jako děti (We are as old children)
