= Žentour =

Czech pop rock band

- Origin: Prague, Czechoslovakia
- Genres: Alternative rock; pop rock
- Years active: 1981–1991; 2009; 2013–present
- Members: Janek Ledecký; Jan Černý; Štěpán Smetáček; Lukáš Martinek; Jára Bárta
- Past members: David Koller; Petr Ackermann; Václav Kabát; Jan Šulc; Michal Šenbauer; Jiří Šedivý; Jaromír Kašpar; Pavel Skala; Ája Suková; Helena Dlasková

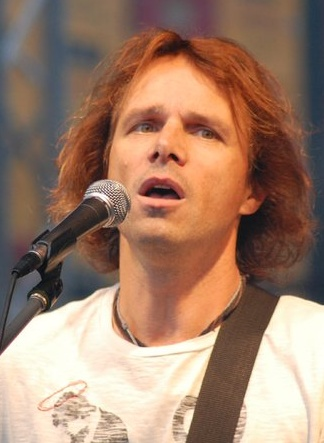
Janek Ledecký in 2009

Žentour is a Czech pop rock group led by Janek Ledecký. They have been active since the early 1980s and has gone through a number of lineup changes over the years, as well as several prolonged breaks. They have released four studio albums as well as three albums of English versions of their Czech material. As of March 2020, Žentour is on hiatus, and they haven't released any new music since 2014.

== History ==
In 1981, jazz musician Jan Šulc was looking for people to start a band with at the Prague Conservatory. Bass guitarist Jan Černý, keyboardist Petr Ackermann, drummer Václav Kabát, and guitarist and singer Janek Ledecký joined the project. Šulc originally kept the name of his previous band, Hemenex, with the assumption that they would play jazz. The other members leaned toward rock, however. The name was changed to Žentour after the title of one of their first songs. Šulc switched to playing guitar instead of keys, and their sound began to fit the new wave genre, which was then gaining popularity in Czechoslovakia. Žentour made their first appearance as an opening act for Abraxas in late 1982. In February 1983, Šulc left the band. Ackermann took over guitar duties, and Černý became band leader.

In 1985, drummer Kabát parted ways with the group and was replaced by David Koller (Jasná Páka, Kollerband), who also sang backing vocals alongside lead vocalist Ledecký. In 1986, the band recorded their first album, Žentour 001, featuring guest vocals by actress Ivana Chýlková, as well as an English version, titled Žentour 002.

In addition to playing concerts in Czechoslovakia, Žentour toured Poland, Sweden, and the Soviet Union. Koller left at the end of 1987 in order to focus on his other band, Lucie, and Ackermann took over on drums, though he also left shortly after. This was followed by a number of personnel changes. 1990 saw the release of the band's sophomore album, Žentour 003, once again followed by an English version, Žentour 004, and in 1991, they issued Žentour 005 and Žentour 006 (this, again, being the English version of Žentour 005). In 1992, the band broke up when Ledecký left to pursue a solo career.

In 2009, Žentour reunited and toured Slovakia. In 2014, a new album was released, titled Žentour 007, although this time an English version did not follow. The music was written by Černý and the lyrics by Ledecký. Other members of the group at this stage were drummer Štěpán Smetáček, guitarist Lukáš Martinek, and keyboardist Jára Bárta.

== Band members ==
Current

- Janek Ledecký – vocals, guitar
- Jan Černý – bass
- Štěpán Smetáček – drums
- Lukáš Martinek – guitar
- Jára Bárta – keyboards

Past

- David Koller – drums, backing vocals
- Petr Ackermann – keyboards, drums, guitar
- Václav Kabát – drums
- Jan Šulc – keyboards, guitar
- Michal Šenbauer – guitar
- Jiří Šedivý – guitar
- Jaromír Kašpar – drums
- Pavel Skala – drums
- Ája Suková – vocals
- Helena Dlasková – vocals

== Discography ==
=== Studio albums ===
- Žentour 001 (1986)
- Žentour 002 (English version of Žentour 001, 1986)
- Žentour 003 (1990)
- Žentour 004 (English version of Žentour 003, 1990)
- Žentour 005 (1991)
- Žentour 006 (English version of Žentour 005, 1991)
- Žentour 007 (2014)

=== Singles ===
- "Všechno bude fajn"
- "Proklínám"
- "Utajený světadíl"
- "Skončil flám"
- "Promilujem celou noc"
- "Pojď ven"
- "V příštím životě"

== Awards ==
- Bratislavská lýra – Bronze prize for "Promilujem celou noc" (1989)
