= Clarinet Factory =

Czech clarinet quartet

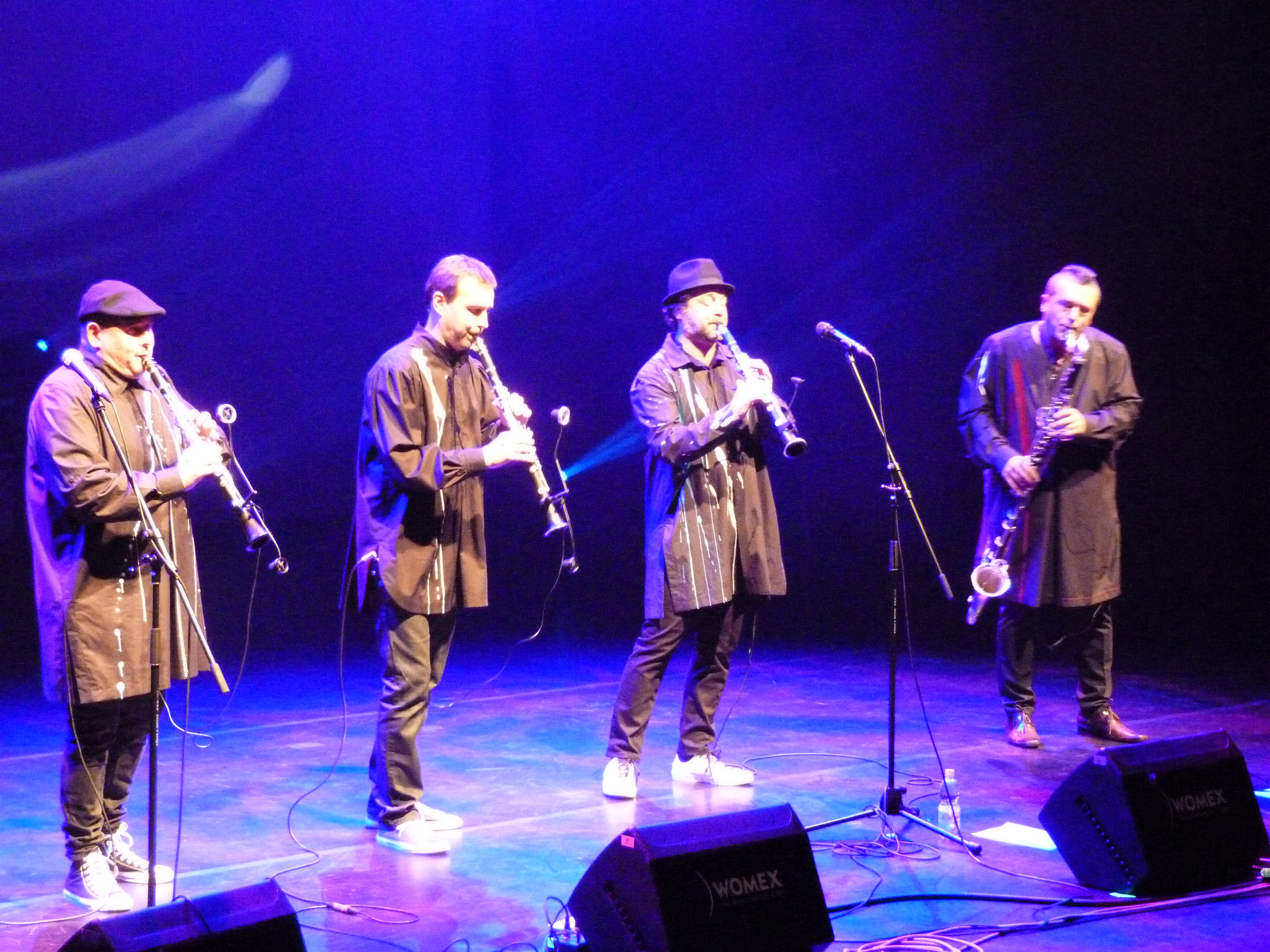
- Clarinet Factory in 2015

Background information
- Origin: Prague, Czech Republic
- Genres: Classical; jazz; crossover; electronica
- Years active: 1994–present
- Labels: Clarton; Aura-Pont; Homerecords; Supraphon
- Members: Jindřich Pavliš; Luděk Boura; Vojtěch Nýdl; Petr Valášek
- Past members: Jiří Sedláček
- Website: clarinet-factory.cz/en

Clarinet Factory is a Czech clarinet quartet formed in Prague in 1994. The group plays classical music, jazz, crossover, ethnic, minimalist, electronic, and soundtrack music. The quartet is composed of Jindřich Pavliš, Luděk Boura, Vojtěch Nýdl, and Petr "Pepino" Valášek.

== Eternal Seekers ==
In 2008, Lenka Dusilová, together with Beata Hlavenková and Clarinet Factory, launched a project called Eternal Seekers. They recorded a self-titled album the same year, for which Dusilová won an Anděl Award in the Best Singer category. The track "Smiluje" was used as the opening song for the 2011 film Long Live the Family! by Robert Sedláček.

== Band members ==
Current

- Jindřich Pavliš – clarinet
- Luděk Boura – clarinet
- Vojtěch Nýdl – clarinet
- Petr "Pepino" Valášek – bass clarinet

Past

- Jiří Sedláček

== Discography ==
- Echoes from Stone (2003)
- Polyphony (2005)
- Eternal Seekers (2008) with Lenka Dusilová and Beata Hlavenková
- Out of Home (2010)
- Echoes of Colors (2012)
- Worx and Reworx (2014)
- Meadows (2017)
- Pipers (2020)
- Towers (2024)

== Awards and recognition ==
- Classic Prague Awards 2017 – Meadows (2017)
