= Ledecký =

Ledecký (feminine Ledecká) is a Czech surname. Notable people with the surname include:

- Dagmar Ledecká (1925–2021), Czech ballerina
- Daniela Ledecká, Slovak hurdler
- David Ledecký (born 1993), Czech footballer
- Ester Ledecká (born 1995), Czech skier and snowboarder
- Janek Ledecký (born 1962), Czech musician
- Jon Ledecky (born 1958), American businessman
- Katie Ledecky (born 1997), American swimmer
