= Bambini di Praga =

Czech children's choir (1973–2011)

- Choir
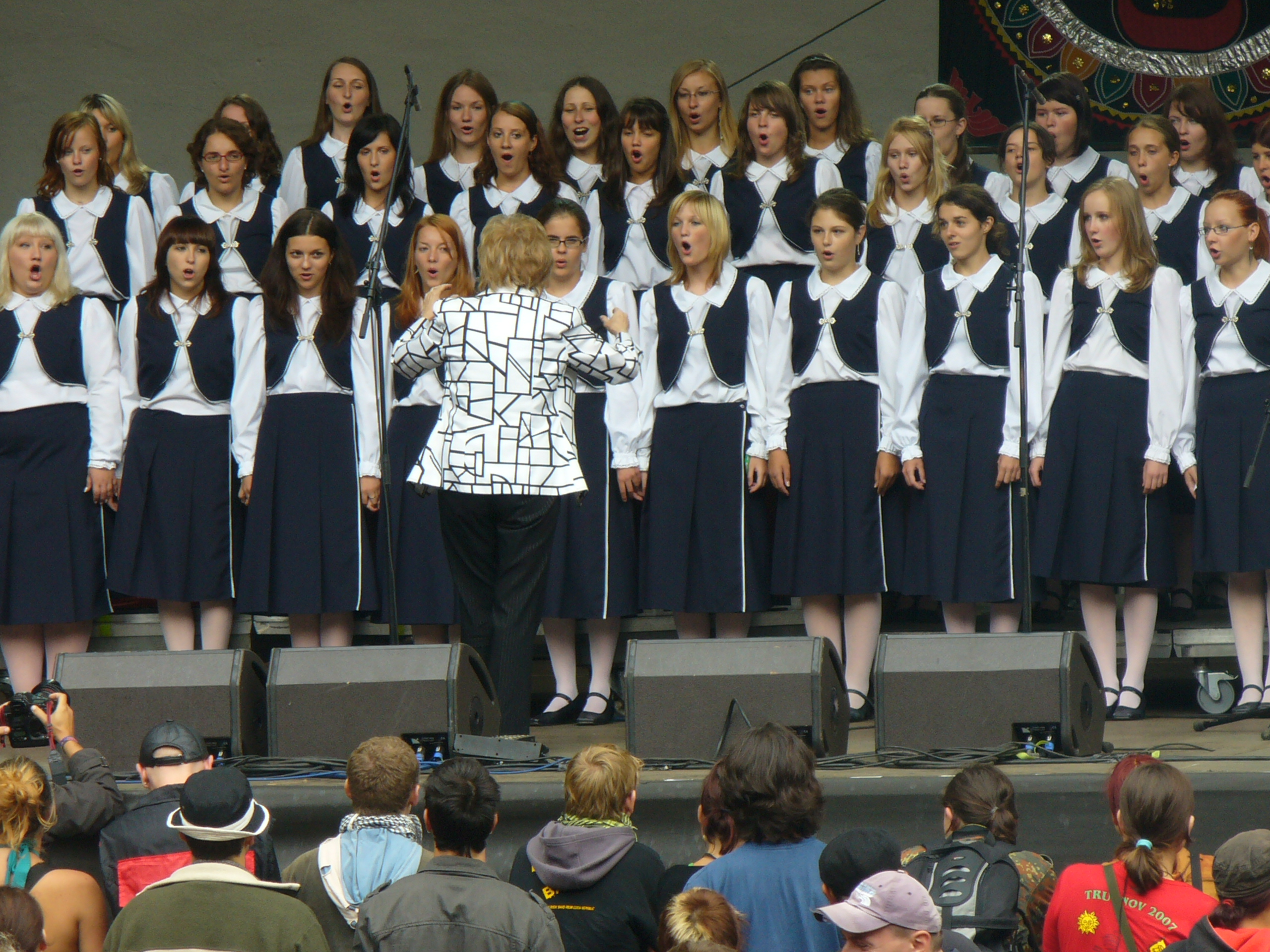
- Bambini di Praga at Trutnov Open Air Music Festival in 2007
- Also known as: Kulínčata; Bambini
- Former name: Hrabůvští singers Dětský pěvecký sbor Československého rozhlasu
- Origin: Czechoslovakia
- Founded: 1973
- Founder: Bohumil Kulínský Sr.
- Disbanded: 2011
- Genre: Vocal music
- Choirmaster: Blanka Kulínská; Bohumil Kulínský Jr.

Bambini di Praga ("Children of Prague" in Italian) was a Czech children's choir based in Prague and active from 1973 to 2011. The collective was composed mainly of girls.

== History ==
=== Early days and predecessors ===
In 1939, Bohumil Kulínský Sr. (born 1910) established a children's choir in Hrabůvka, a district of Ostrava, at the time a part of the Protectorate of Bohemia and Moravia. The choir was called Hrabůvští singers and they won their first singing competition in 1940. Thanks to this success, Kulínský was invited to Prague where in 1945, he founded Dětský pěvecký sbor Československého rozhlasu (Children's Choir of Czechoslovak Radio), also known as Kulínčata. During this period, the choir's popularity grew.

=== Bambini and Bimbi ===
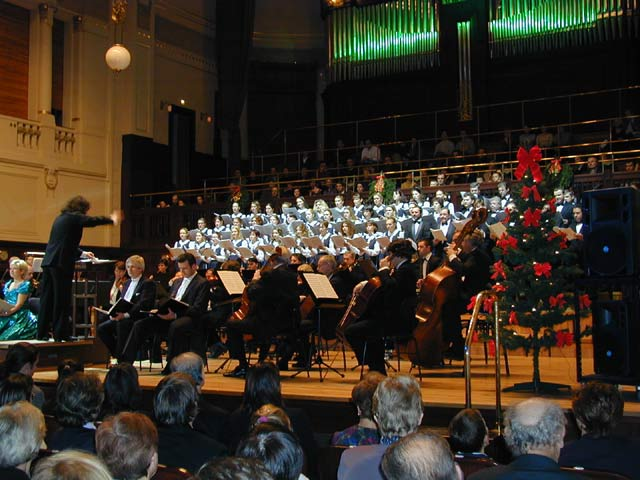
Bambini di Praga at the Municipal House concert hall in Prague, 2006

In 1973, cooperation with Czechoslovak Radio was interrupted. Kulínský, together with his wife Blanka, continued at the helm of the choir, however, and they rehearsed in a primary school instead, where they remained until the 2002 Prague floods. On 1 May 1973, the choir was renamed Bambini di Praga.

Around 1975, at the age of 16 or 17, Bohumil Kulínský Jr. created a second choir, Bimbi di Praga, composed of the smallest and most talented singers. Several well-known musicians have passed through the ranks of the younger choir, including Lenka Dusilová, Martina Čechová, and Jana Boušková. In 1977, Kulínský Jr. became the choirmaster of Bambini di Praga. His father died in 1988.

During this time, Blanka Kulínská led Chlapecký sbor Pražského mužského sboru FOK (Boys' Choir of the Prague Men's Choir FOK). Some famous names who have performed in the choir include David Koller, Petr Malásek, Jan Čenský, Tomáš Trapl, Martin Kumžák, and Radek Krejčí.

In 1990, six months after the Velvet Revolution in Czechoslovakia, Blanka Kulínská and Bohumil Kulínský Jr. established a private music school in Prague, Škola sborového zpěvu při Bambini di Praga (Bambini di Praga School of Choral Singing).

=== Bohumil Kulínský's conviction and last days of Bambini ===
In 2004, Bohumil Kulínský was arrested and charged with numerous acts of sexual abuse of minors, with a final tally of 49 victims between 1984 and 2004. On 23 April 2008, he was sentenced to 3 years imprisonment with parole for the sexual abuse of 23 girls, some of whom were as young 15 when the acts took place. Kulínský began his sentence, by that point extended to 5.5 years, in January 2009.

On 28 June 2011, shortly after Bohumil Kulínský's conditional release from prison, Bambini di Praga announced that they would end their activities.

In September 2018, Kulínský died of kidney failure at the age of 59. His mother, Blanka, died in 2022.

In 2025, Broken Voices, a film directed by Ondřej Provazník and inspired by the real-life Bambini di Praga case, was released. It had its world premiere on 6 July, at the 59th Karlovy Vary International Film Festival, where it competed for the Crystal Globe.

== Partial discography ==
- Veselé Vánoce - Merry Christmas (1982)
- Czech Contemporary Choral Works: Concerto piccolo (1983)
- Cvičíme S Hudbou, Vol. 3 (1983)
- Moravské Koledy (1988)
- World Famous Christmas Carols (1990)
- Carolling (1991)
- Ovčáci a Čtveráci (1991)
- Moravian Duets - Ten Songs (1991)
- Ave Maria (Famous Sacred Choral Works) (1992)
- České koledy 1 (1994)
- České koledy 2 (1994)
- Já Písnička 1. (1994)
- Skákal Pes (1994)
- Já Písnička 2. (1995)
- Já Písnička 3. (1996)
- Já Písnička 4. (1997)
- Merry Christmas (1998)
- Já Písnička 5. (1999)
- Zpívání O Lásce/Singing of Love (2001)
- Když Polka Zavolá... (2007)
- Dvorak: Svata Ludmila (2012)
