= Pusa (Czech band) =

Czech rock band

- Origin: Czech Republic
- Genres: Rock; pop
- Years active: mid-1990s
- Labels: B&M Music
- Past members: Lenka Dusilová; David Koller; Marek Minárik; Petr Novák; Marek Zelený; Oldřich Krejčoves

Pusa was a Czech pop-rock band formed in the mid-1990s by Lucie members David Koller and Marek Minárik, together with Lenka Dusilová, and included a number of rotating session musicians.

== History ==
Pusa, formed in the mid-1990s by Lucie rockers David Koller and Marek Minárik, together with rising star Lenka Dusilová, released their eponymous debut album in 1996. A second album was supposed to be released in 1998, but as Koller and Minárik were busy with their main project, Lucie, Dusilová disbanded the group. They met again in 2000 and supported Dusilová in the recording of her first solo album, which included, among others, three songs from the originally planned second Pusa album.

Dusilová has since led a successful solo career, while Koller formed Kollerband, which also included Minárik and Krejčoves. Both Dusilová and Koller still include several Pusa songs in their respective repertoires.

== Band members ==
- Lenka Dusilová – vocals, guitar
- David Koller – drums, keyboards, vocals
- Marek Minárik – bass, udu
- Petr Novák – guitar, saxophone
- Marek Zelený – guitar
- Oldřich Krejčoves – guitar

== Discography ==
- Pusa (1996)
