= Hudba Praha =

Czech rock band

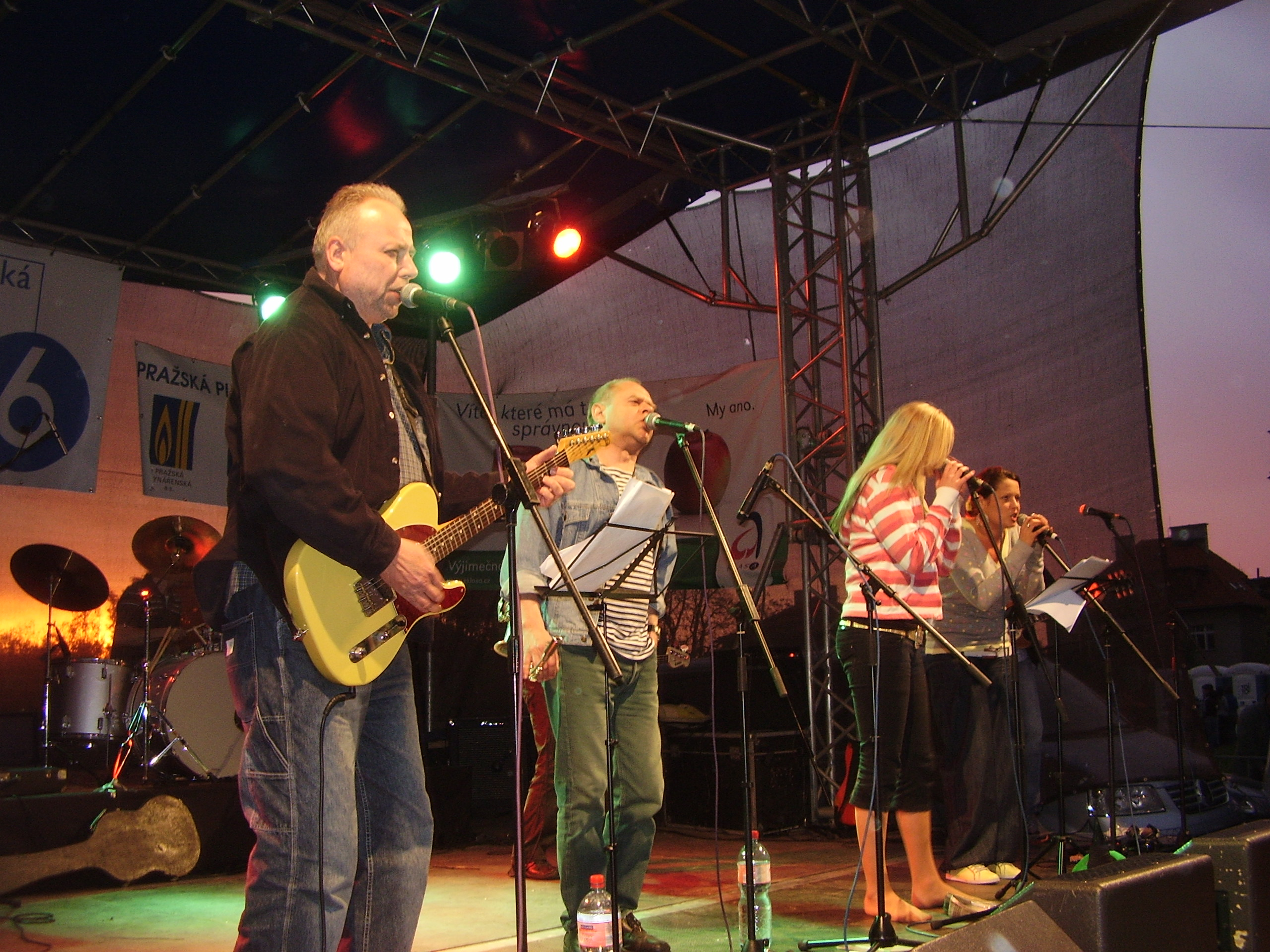
- Hudba Praha performing in 2009

Background information
- Origin: Prague, Czechoslovakia
- Genres: Rock
- Years active: 1984–1996; 1999–2015 (Hudba Praha); 2015–present (Hudba Praha Band); 2016–2022 (Michal Ambrož a Hudba Praha)
- Spinoffs: Hudba Praha Band, Michal Ambrož a Hudba Praha
- Spinoff of: Jasná Páka
- Past members: Michal Ambrož; See Band members section

Hudba Praha was a Czech rock band formed in 1984 by Michal Ambrož, after his previous band, Jasná Páka, was banned by the Communist government of Czechoslovakia. The group was active until 2015, with a hiatus between 1996 and 1999. In 2015, it splintered into two separate entities, known as Hudba Praha Band and Michal Ambrož a Hudba Praha. The band released five studio albums, one double EP, three live albums, and two compilations. Each splinter group has released one album. Michal Ambrož died in 2022.

== History ==
=== Jasná Páka: 1981–1984 ===
Michal Ambrož formed the group Jasná Páka together with painter Vladimír "Dáda" Albrecht in 1981. In its first incarnation, the band also included David Koller on drums, Jan Ivan Wünsch on bass, and Bohumil and Vladimír Zatloukal on guitars, as well as a duo of "screaming" female backing vocalists, Zdena Pištěková and Markéta Vojtěchová. In 1984, Jasná Páka was banned from performing in public. Ambrož wanted to continue playing, but rather than going underground, he retired the original moniker and renamed his musical ensemble Hudba Praha. Koller and Bohumil Zatloukal left to join 5P (Luboš Pospíšil's band), and Albrecht decided to dedicate himself to painting. Wünsch, Vladimír Zatloukal, Vojtěchová, and Pištěková remained with the new group.

=== First iteration of Hudba Praha: 1984–1996 ===
As the newly established group began to play, evading the ban placed on their previous instantiation, they were joined by a third female singer, Alena Daňková. Drummer Libor Kubánek joined in 1985 but was soon replaced by Ludvík "Eman ET" Kandl. The lineup was supplemented by three new instruments: keyboards, played by Tomáš "Bond" Volák, tenor saxophone by Vítek Malinovský, and alto saxophone by Karel Malík. At the end of the decade, vocalist Jarmila "Jamajka" Koblicová joined, and Bohumil Zatloukal returned. The band performed all over Czechoslovakia, mainly in clubs, cultural halls, pubs, and at country dances.

In 1988, the group released a self-titled double EP, which was re-issued the same year as a full-length album. In 1992, the live album 10 let Hudby Praha / Jasná páka, recorded on 8 December 1991 at Prague's Lucerna, was released.

At the beginning of the 1990s, the band's female vocal section was reduced to Koblicová and the newly added Daniela Čelková. A second studio album, titled Maelström, was published in 1993 by EMI/Monitor. A year later, Reflex Records issued the compilation Starý pecky (a tak dál...) and in 1995, the band's third studio effort, Maják, was released by Bonton Music.

The first epoch of Hudba Praha ended in 1996, due to various members focusing on solo projects. That year, Bonton released their fourth studio album, Divoký srdce, a name that Ambrož went on to use for his new project. The band promoted the record with a nationwide tour that culminated at Prague's Lucerna on 6 November 1996. The final performance was recorded and published in 1997 as a double live album, titled Nashledanou.

=== Second iteration: 1999–2009 ===
On 1 June 1999, Jan Ivan Wünsch died, shortly before a charity concert for Kosovo, which Hudba Praha was supposed to participate in, after a three-year hiatus. Bassist Jiří Jelínek joined the group, and Hudba Praha was able to perform at the event. Following this reunion, the band decided to continue playing together.

They toured and performed numerous concerts in the subsequent years, and in 2006, by then known as Jasná Páka/Hudba Praha, the band celebrated its twenty-fifth anniversary and was inducted into the Beat Hall of Fame. A year later, they issued a double concert album, titled 25 pecek, which was recorded on 6 December 2006 at Prague's Acropolis Palace. The release included a DVD of the performance as well as the documentary film Společenství Jasná páka, directed by Oliver Malina Morgenstern.

In 2008, Michal Ambrož and Vladimír Zatloukal officially reformed Jasná Páka as a separate group, together with David Koller and several new members. As for Hudba Praha, the group underwent a number of lineup changes, with Ludvík Kandl being replaced by Michael "Šimon" Šimůnek and Karolina Skalníková taking the place of Daniela Čelková. She was in turn replaced by Petra Studená, and singer and artist Petr Váša began making regular guest appearances with the group. At the beginning of 2009, Studená left Hudba Praha, followed shortly by Jarmila Koblicová and Bohumil Zatloukal.

=== Third iteration and split: 2009–2015 ===
Having lost a number of musicians, Hudba Praha was forced to seek replacements. They engaged the young conservatory students Kristýna "Týna" Peteříková and Alena "Álla" Sudová as vocalists. On the tenth anniversary of Wünsch's death, a commemorative event was held at Prague's Acropolis, combining musical performances with the launch of Vojtěch Lindaur's biography of Jan Ivan Wünsch, titled Bav se s volem o sobotě. Other performers at the event included Vladimír Mišík, Jaroslav Olin Nejezchleba, and Pavel Skála. Former saxophonist Vítek Malinovský also rejoined the group.

In 2009, Hudba Praha began recording a new studio album, their first in fourteen years. Published in 2010, De Generace included a number of reimagined songs from the band's repertoire as well as some new tracks. The band continued to tour following the album's release, and in 2013, they issued another compilation, under the title ...all the best, which also included several new songs.

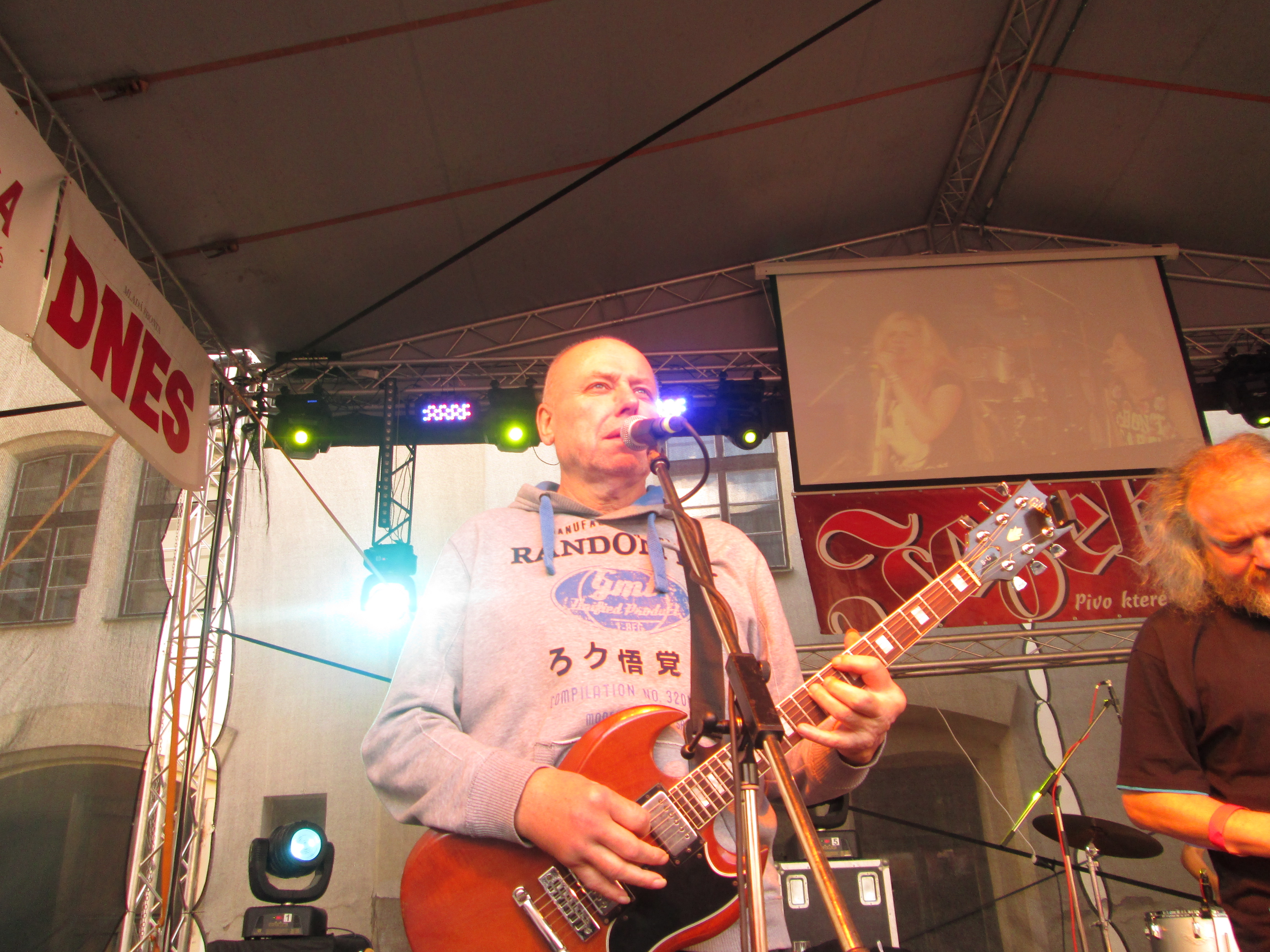
Michal Ambrož performing with Hudba Praha in 2014

In 2014, Michal Ambrož published Černá deska with Jasná Páka, their first studio release. That year, apart from disagreements within Hudba Praha, Ambrož began to experience severe symptoms of an illness, and all his projects were subsequently put on hold. After undergoing medical treatment and recovering, Ambrož returned to rehearsing, but all progress had stalled within Hudba Praha, and the group split up in 2015.

=== Hudba Praha Band ===
After the breakup of Hudba Praha, two separate groups, both bearing the same name, took over the original band's repertoire and continued in its footsteps. The first was Hudba Praha Band, which consisted of some former members of Hudba Praha and the original Jasná Páka, minus Michal Ambrož: Vladimír and Bohumil Zatloukal, both on guitar and vocals; Jiří Jelínek on bass; Ludvík Kandl (later replaced by Pavel Skála and in turn, Tomáš Stoukal) on drums; Jakub Douda on tenor saxophone; Michaela Šponar Fojtová and Lucie Jandová on vocals; and Zdeněk Hnyk on guitar and lead vocals. The two female vocalists were later replaced by Jarmila Koblicová and Daniela Litváková Čelková. The group played both Hudba Praha and Jasná Páka songs.

In November 2021, Hudba Praha Band released their first studio album, titled Barevný sny. It contained a number of songs previously written for Hudba Praha and Jasná Páka, as well as a few new tracks.

=== Michal Ambrož a Hudba Praha ===
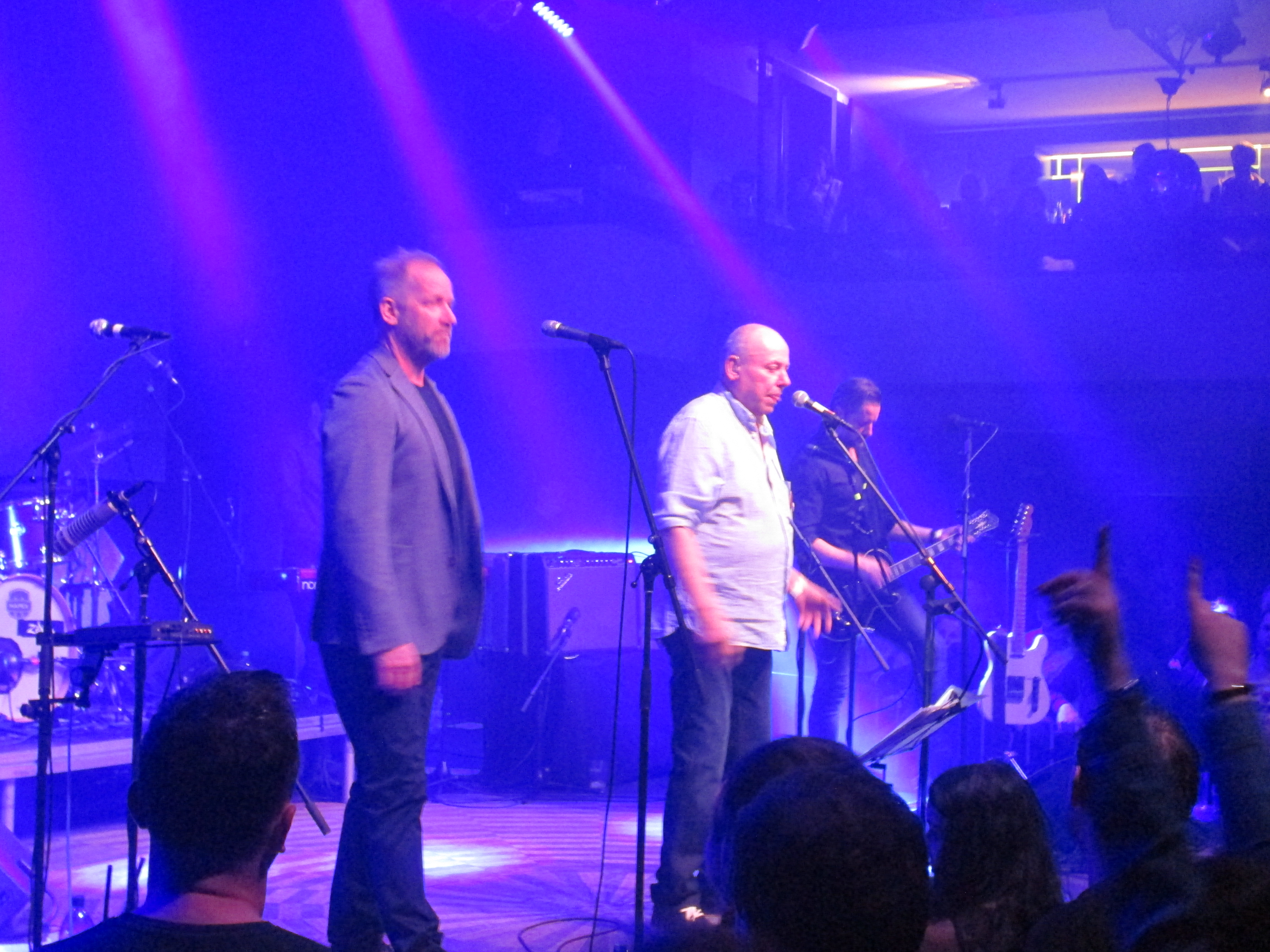
Michal Ambrož with David Koller performing with Michal Ambrož a Hudba Praha in 2017

The second group that emerged from Hudba Praha's split went by the name Michal Ambrož a Hudba Praha, which, apart from its titular leader, included frequent guest David Koller on drums; Michal Pelant and Radovan Jelínek on guitars; Jakub Vejnar on bass; Martin Kopřiva on drums; Matěj Belko on guitar and keyboards; Jakub Doležal on tenor saxophone; and Markéta Tošovská Foukalová and Tereza Kopáčková on vocals. The group released the album Hudba Praha & Michal Ambrož in 2019.

== Michal Ambrož: 1954–2022 ==
Michal Ambrož, born on 23 January 1954 in Havlíčkův Brod, fronted the bands Jasná Páka, Hudba Praha, Divoký srdce, and Michal Ambrož a Hudba Praha. He hosted the shows Kalumet and Naděje Beatu on Radio Beat and in 2016, recorded the album Srdeční příběh, which was produced by David Koller. It included contributions from various musicians connected to Ambrož's career, such as violinist Radovan Jelínek and vocalists Magdaléna Krištofeková, Pavla Táboříková, and Jarmila Koblicová, as well as others, such as drummer Martin Valihora and singer Richard Müller. Ambrož died on 31 October 2022.

== Band members ==
=== Hudba Praha ===
- Michal Ambrož – guitar, vocals (1984–1996; 1999–2015; died 2022)
- Jan Ivan Wünsch – bass (1984–1999 [died])
- Vladimír Zatloukal – guitar, backing vocals (1984–1996; 1999–2015)
- Tomáš "Bond" Volák – keyboards (1984–1988)
- Zdena Pištěková – backing vocals (1984–1991)
- Markéta Vojtěchová – backing vocals (1984–1991)
- Alena Daňková – backing vocals (1984–1991)
- Libor Kubánek – drums (1985)
- Ludvík "Eman ET" Kandl – drums (1985–1996; 1999–2006)
- Vítek Malinovský – tenor saxophone, backing vocals, harmonica (1985–1996; 1999–2015)
- Karel Malík – alto saxophone, backing vocals (1987–1996; 1999–2015; died 2025)
- Bohumil Zatloukal – guitar, backing vocals (1989–1996; 1999–2009)
- Jarmila "Jamajka" Koblicová – backing vocals (1989–1996; 1999–2009)
- Eva Mišíková – keyboards (1990–1993)
- Daniela Litváková Čelková – backing vocals (1991–1996; 1999–2006)
- Jiří Jelínek – bass (1999–2015)
- Karolina Skalníková – backing vocals (2006)
- Petra Studená – backing vocals (2006–2009)
- Michael "Šimon" Šimůnek – drums (2006–2015)
- Kristýna "Týna" Peteříková – backing vocals (2009–2015)
- Alena "Álla" Sudová – backing vocals (2009–2015)

=== Hudba Praha Band ===
Current

- Vladimír Zatloukal – guitar, backing vocals
- Bohumil Zatloukal – guitar, backing vocals
- Jiří Jelínek – bass
- Zdeněk Hnyk – guitar, vocals
- Tomáš Stoukal – drums
- Jakub Douda – tenor saxophone
- Jarmila Koblicová – backing vocals
- Daniela Litváková Čelková – backing vocals

Past

- Ludvík Kandl – drums
- Pavel Skála – drums
- Michaela Šponar Fojtová – backing vocals
- Lucie Lu Jandová – backing vocals

=== Michal Ambrož a Hudba Praha ===
Current

- Jiří Šimek – guitar, backing vocals
- Radovan Jelínek – guitar, backing vocals
- Jakub Vejnar – bass, Chapman Stick
- Jakub Doležal – saxophone
- Veronika Vítová – backing vocals
- Terezy Kopáčková – backing vocals
- Martin Kopřiva – drums

Past

- Michal Ambrož – vocals (died 2022)
- Michal Pelant – guitar
- Matěj Belko – guitar, keyboards
- Markéta Tošovská Foukalová – backing vocals

== Discography ==
=== Hudba Praha ===
Studio albums

- Hudba Praha (1990)
- Maelström (1993)
- Maják (1995)
- Divoký srdce (1996)
- De Generace (2010)

EPs

- Hudba Praha (1988)

Live albums

- 10 let Hudby Praha / Jasná páka (1992)
- Nashledanou (1997)
- 25 pecek (2007)

Compilations

- Starý pecky (a tak dál...) (1994)
- ...all the Best (2013)

=== Hudba Praha Band ===
- Barevný sny (2021)

=== Michal Ambrož a Hudba Praha ===
- Hudba Praha & Michal Ambrož (2019)

=== Michal Ambrož ===
- Srdeční příběh (2016)
