= Lenka Dusilová =

Czech musician (born 1975)

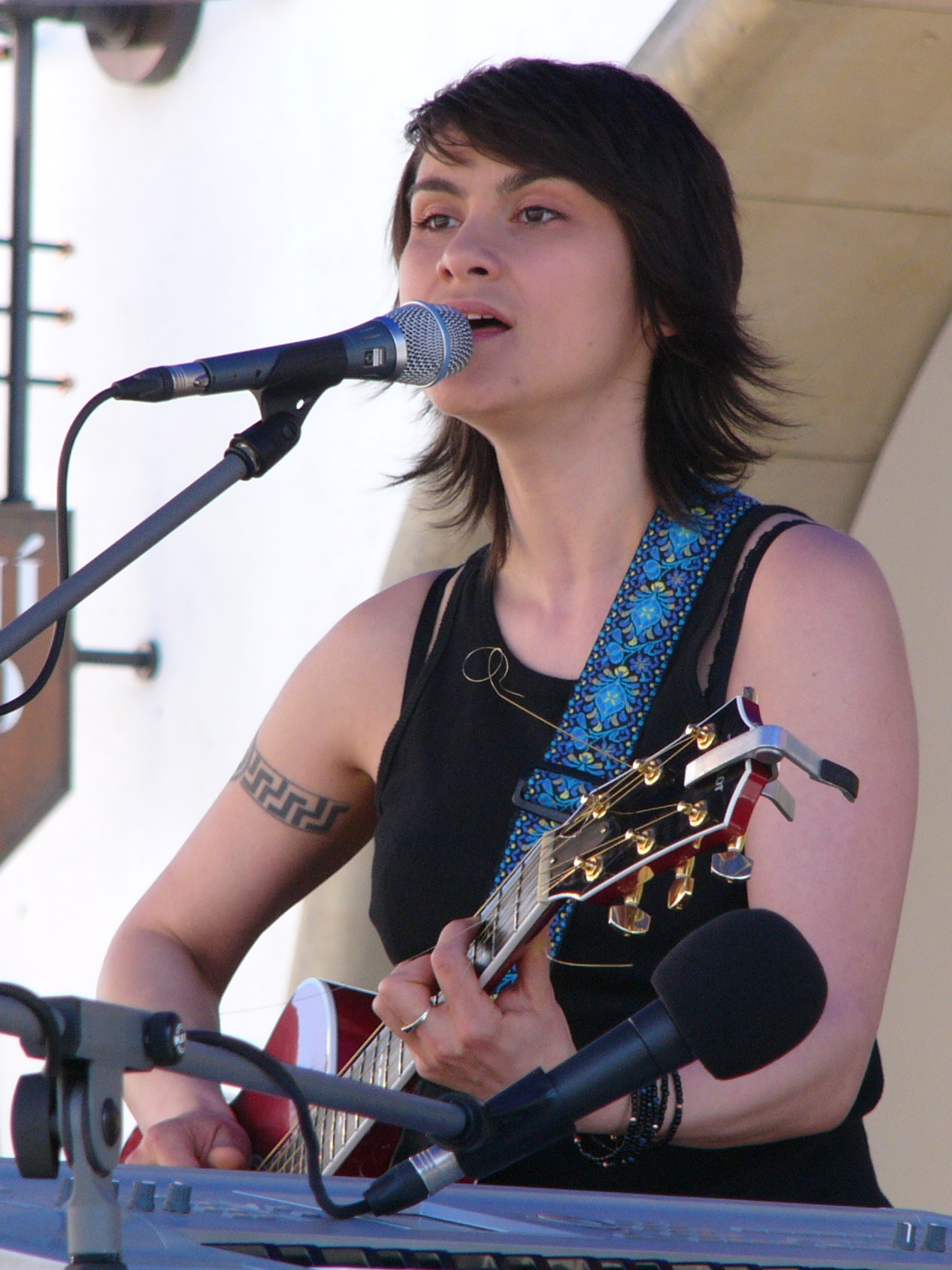
- Dusilová in 2008

Background information
- Born: 28 December 1975 (age 49); Karlovy Vary, Czechoslovakia
- Genres: Alternative rock; acoustic rock
- Occupation: Musician
- Instruments: Guitar; vocals
- Years active: 1988–present
- Labels: B&M; Universal
- Formerly of: Bambini di Praga; RSP; Sluníčko; Lucie; Pusa
- Website: lenkadusilova.art/en

Lenka Dusilová (born 28 December 1975) is a Czech singer-songwriter and multiple-Anděl Award winner.

== Career ==
=== Early years: 1988–2000 ===
Dusilová began her career in 1988, joining the Bambini di Praga children's choir at age thirteen after singing in the family band RSP with her mother and brother. RSP played folk music set to Czech and Polish poetry. During the 1990s, Dusilová was a full and guest member of several groups.

Between 1991 and 1995, she led the rock band Sluníčko, which released an eponymous album in 1994, won the Marlboro Rock '94 competition, and opened the Open Air Gampell music festival in Switzerland. That year, Dusilová was nominated for the Discovery of the Year Anděl Award.

Between 1994 and 1997, the artist was a guest member of the rock band Lucie. In 1996, she formed the group Pusa with Lucie members David Koller and Marek Minárik. Their song "Muka" was nominated for an Anděl Award in 1996.

=== First three solo albums: 2000–2004 ===
Dusilová won the Anděl Award for Female Singer of the Year in 2000 and the same year, she sang guest vocals on the Čechomor album Proměny, which was produced by Jaz Coleman and also featured David Koller on guest drums. The album's title track won an Anděl Award in 2001 for Song of the Year, while the record won Album of the Year. Also in 2000, she released her debut solo album, titled Lenka Dusilová. She followed it with Spatřit světlo světa in 2002 and UnEarthEd in 2004. This release was her first to be published in the United States.

=== Mezi Světy and Eternal Seekers: 2005–2008 ===
Dusilová's 2005 album, Mezi Světy, went Gold within weeks of its release. It won the 2005 Anděl Award for Best Rock Album, and she received the award for Best Female Singer. The record was produced in the United States and featured Scott Amendola on drums, among other American session musicians.

In 2008, together with Beata Hlavenková and Clarinet Factory, Dusilová launched a project called Eternal Seekers. They recorded a self-titled album the same year, for which Dusilová won an Anděl Award in the Best Singer category. The track "Smiluje" was used as the opening song for the 2011 film Long Live the Family! by Robert Sedláček.

=== Subsequent albums and projects: 2011–present ===
In 2011, Dusilová released her fifth solo studio album, titled Baromantika. She went on to form a group of the same name, which also included Eternal Seekers bandmate Beata Hlavenková. In 2013, they released the live album Live at Café v lese and followed up in 2014 with the studio recording V hodině smrti.

In 2020, Dusilová released her sixth studio album, Řeka.

== Discography ==
=== Solo ===
- Lenka Dusilová (2000)
- Spatřit světlo světa (2002)
- UnEarthEd (2004)
- Mezi světy (2005)
- Mezi světy US version (2006)
- Baromantika (2011)
- Řeka (2020)

=== Other albums ===
- Sluníčko with Sluníčko (1994)
- Pusa with Pusa (1996)
- Eternal Seekers, with Clarinet Factory and Beata Hlavenková (2008)
- Live at Café v lese with Baromantika (2013)
- V hodině smrti with Baromantika (2014)

=== Guest appearances ===
- Déva by Dušan Vozáry (1993)
- Lorien by Lorien (1993)
- Černý kočky, mokrý žáby by Lucie (1996)
- Meky by Miroslav Žbirka (1997)
- Smrtihlav by Daniel Landa (1998)
- Čechomor by Čechomor (2000)
- Proměny by Čechomor (2002)
- Čechomor Live by Čechomor (2002)
- Proměny Tour 2003 by Čechomor (2003)
- Co sa stalo nové by Čechomor (2005)
- Rande s panem Bendou by Wohnout (2006)
- Live u Staré Paní by Vertigo quintet (2006)
- Dívčí válka by Jan Burian (2006)
- Muži jsou křehcí by Jan Burian (2007)
- Polib si dědu by Wohnout (2007)
- Bob America by Bob America (2007)
- Michal Pavlíček a Beatová síň slávy by Michal Pavlíček (2007)
- Bílá velryba by Michal Hrůza (2007)
- Dirty Movie Music by MED (2008)
- Joy for Joel by Beata Hlavenková (2009)
- Miu Miu by Květy (2010)
- Ty Lidi by Jaryn Janek (2011)
- V čajové konvici by Květy (2011)
- Dobrý časy by Václav Neckář (2012)

== Awards and nominations ==
Year	Work	Award	Category	Result	Ref
1994	Herself	Anděl Awards	Discovery of the Year	Nominated	
1996	"Muka" by Pusa	Anděl Awards	Song of the Year	Nominated	
2000	Herself	Anděl Awards	Female Singer of the Year	Won	
2003	Herself	Anděl Awards	Female Singer of the Year	Nominated	
2005	Herself	Anděl Awards	Female Singer of the Year	Won	
2006	Mezi světy	Anděl Awards	Album of the Year – Rock	Won	
2006	Herself	Anděl Awards	Female Singer of the Year	Won	
2006	Herself	Óčko Music Awards	Best Domestic Singer	Won	
2007	Herself	Anděl Awards	Female Singer of the Year	Nominated	
2008	Herself	Anděl Awards	Female Singer of the Year	Won	
2011	Herself	Anděl Awards	Female Singer of the Year	Won	
2011	Baromantika	Anděl Awards	Album of the Year	Nominated	
2013	Herself	Anděl Awards	Female Singer of the Year	Won	
2020	Herself	Anděl Awards	Female Singer of the Year	Won	
2020	Řeka	Anděl Awards	Album of the Year	Won	
2020	"Vlákna"	Anděl Awards	Song of the Year	Won	
2020	Řeka	Anděl Awards	Album of the Year – Alternative & Electronic	Nominated	
