= Men in Rut =

- Directed by: Robert Sedláček
- Written by: Robert Sedláček; Martin Skalský
- Produced by: Darina Levová
- Starring: Igor Bareš
- Cinematography: Petr Koblovsky
- Edited by: Matous Outrata
- Release date: 20 August 2009
- Running time: 120 minutes
- Country: Czech Republic
- Language: Czech

Men in Rut (Czech: Muži v říji) is a Czech drama film directed by Robert Sedláček. It was released in 2009.

== Cast ==
- Igor Bareš - Premiér CR
- Jaromír Dulava - Cestmír Weiss
- Jaromír Hanzlík - Jarda Hanák
- Martin Huba - Mistr ucitel
- Jiří Lábus - Ministr zemedelství
- Jaroslav Plesl - Franta
- Martin Trnavský - René
- Marta Vancurová - Pavla
- Eva Vrbková - Eva
- Pavel Zedníček - Starosta Hanácek
- Petr Váša - village idiot
