= Karel Malík =

Czech musician and poet (1960–2025)

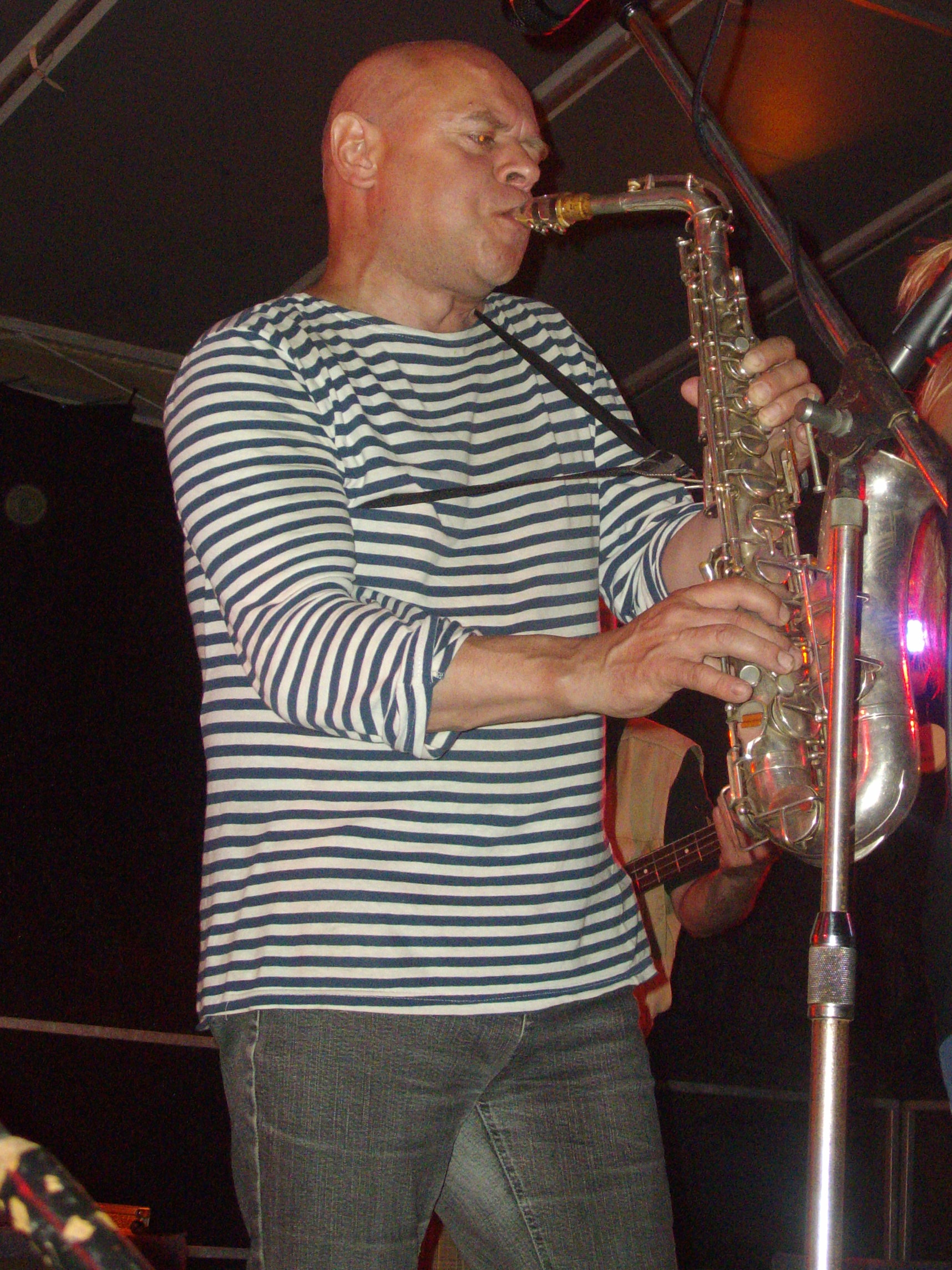
Malík in 2011

Karel Malík (7 December 1960 – 8 July 2025) was a Czech musician, composer, lyricist and poet.

== Life and career ==
Malík came from Košíře district of Prague, trained as an artistic carpenter and eventually studied at the UMPRUM in Prague-Žižkov. He worked in a variety of jobs, such as decoration technician, stall salesman, telephone pole erector, fruit picker, maintenance man and night watchman.

Malík died on 8 July 2025, at the age of 64.

=== Music ===
Malík started playing the Transverse flute, but his main instruments are the alto saxophone and the guitar. He was in several bands, including Rumor Emise Group in Europe, O. P. N., Frou Frou, Sonet, Babalet of the prematurely deceased singer Aleš Drvota, Eman E. T. and Homo Band Ludvík Kandl and Hudba Praha. In 1988 together with Martin Gruša he founded his own pubrock band Echt!, which he led for many years. His colleagues from Hudba Praha guitarist Vladimír Zatloukal and bassist Jiří Jelínek also played in it.

Echt! has three studio albums – Hořký pití (1997), Smutný věci (1998) and Je mi krásně (2001) and one concert 15 let live in Akropolis (2003), all released by the music publishing house Black Point.

=== Poetry ===
His poetic work includes three collections – Vnitřnosti (Zirkus, 2006), Trezor pro Echt! (ANNE Records, 2011) and Chaos (Vetus Via, 2012), the author was working on a fourth. All books are supplemented with his own linocuts.
