= MeetFactory =

Cultural organization, Czech Republic

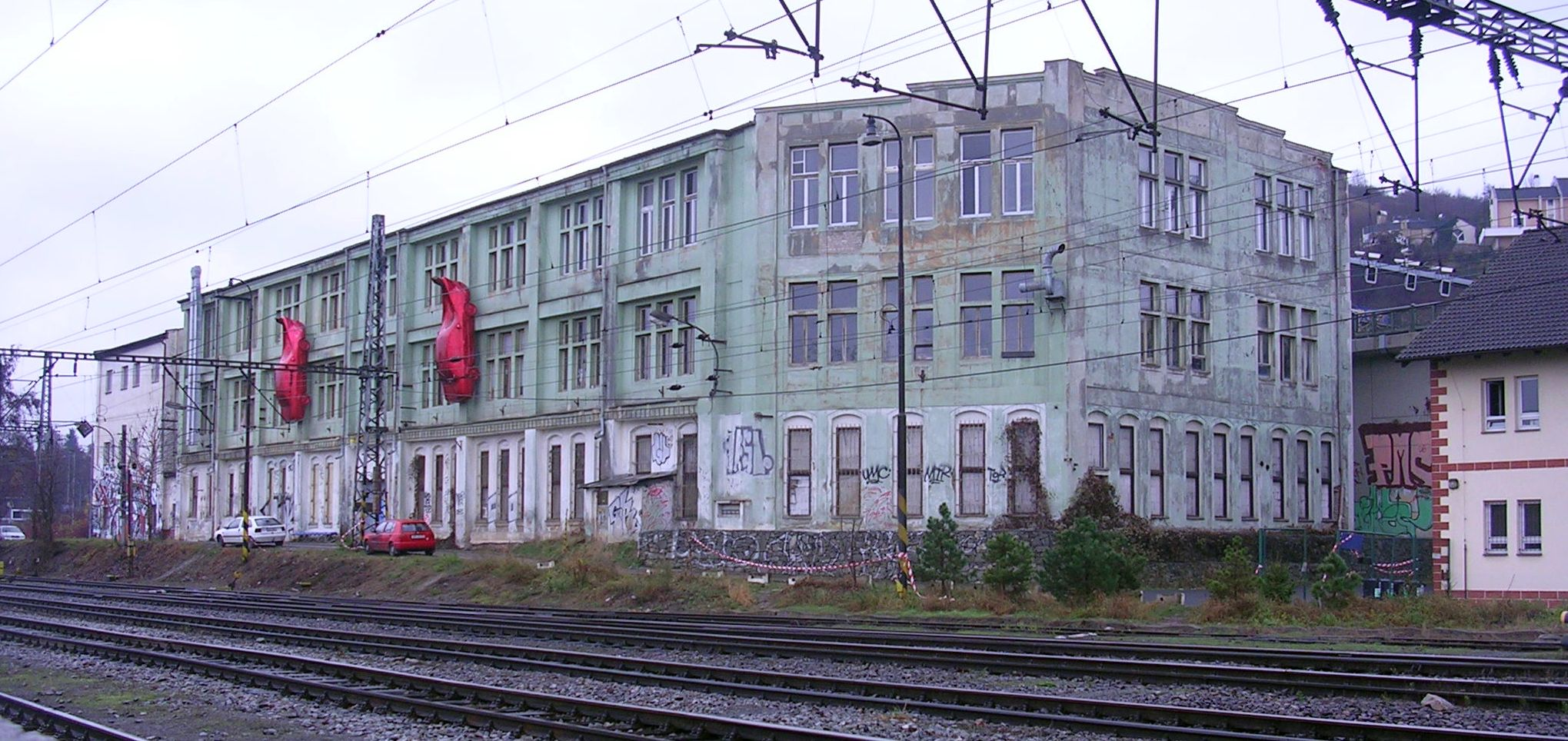
- Formation: 2001
- Founder: David Černý
- Founded at: Holešovice
- Type: Non-profit organisation
- Purpose: Inter-genre and educational projects relating to contemporary art.
- Headquarters: Prague
- Coordinates: 50.053°N 14.408°E
- Board of directors: David Černý, David Koller, Alice Nellis

MeetFactory is a non-profit organization and contemporary art centre in Prague, Czech Republic. It has four departments (music, theatre, gallery, and artists-in-residence) and the rest of the program is focused on interdisciplinary and educational projects relating to contemporary art.

== History of the building ==
MeetFactory was founded in 2001 by David Černý. After the destructive floods of 2002, MeetFactory evacuated its original premises in Holešovice, re-opening three years later in an industrial building in Smíchov, situated between an elevated road and a railway line. The program started after a substantial reconstruction in 2007. A board composed of the artist David Černý, musician David Koller and film and theatre director Alice Nellis approved the long-term plan of MeetFactory.

== Music program ==
In March 2010, in addition to residencies, galleries and theatre, a fourth space for music was added. The concert hall can accommodate 1,000 people and hosts 50–70 concerts per year, including regular and one-off events. In addition to its own music events, MeetFactory organizes around 40 co-productions with various local and national organizations each year, and collaborates with festivals such as Lunchmeat, Sperm, and Komiksfest, or with NGOs such as Amnesty International or with the Czech Association of Paraplegics.

== Theatre program ==
The theatre program focuses on contemporary prose, as well as experimental interdisciplinary projects, often involving visual artists, musicians, or non-actors. The theater has an area of 150 square meters and 150 seats.

== Galleries ==
MeetFactory has three galleries: the MeetFactory Gallery, the Kostka Gallery and the Wall Gallery.

== Artists-in-residence ==
The international artists-in-residence program was established in 2007 and is the largest studio program in the Czech Republic. MeetFactory has fifteen studios, which host around 30 visual artists, curators, musicians, theatre directors or writers each year.

== See also ==
- Jan Zajíček
