= Jan Zajíček =

Czech director and filmmaker (born 1977)

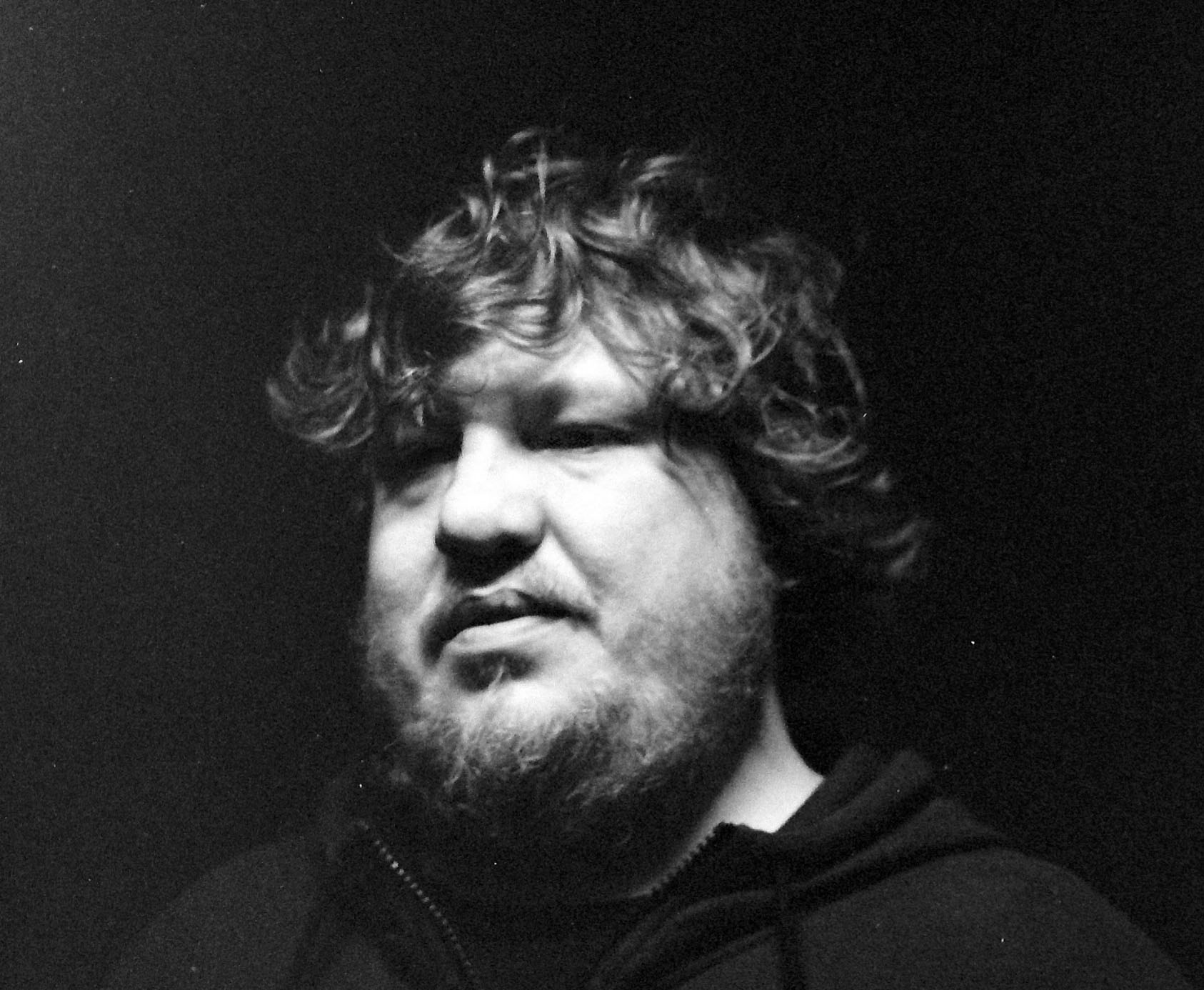
- Born: 4 March 1977 (age 49); Prague, Czechoslovakia
- Education: Academy of Performing Arts in Prague
- Occupations: film director, screenwriter

Jan Zajíček (born 4 March 1977) is a Czech film director, screenwriter and artist.

== Early life ==
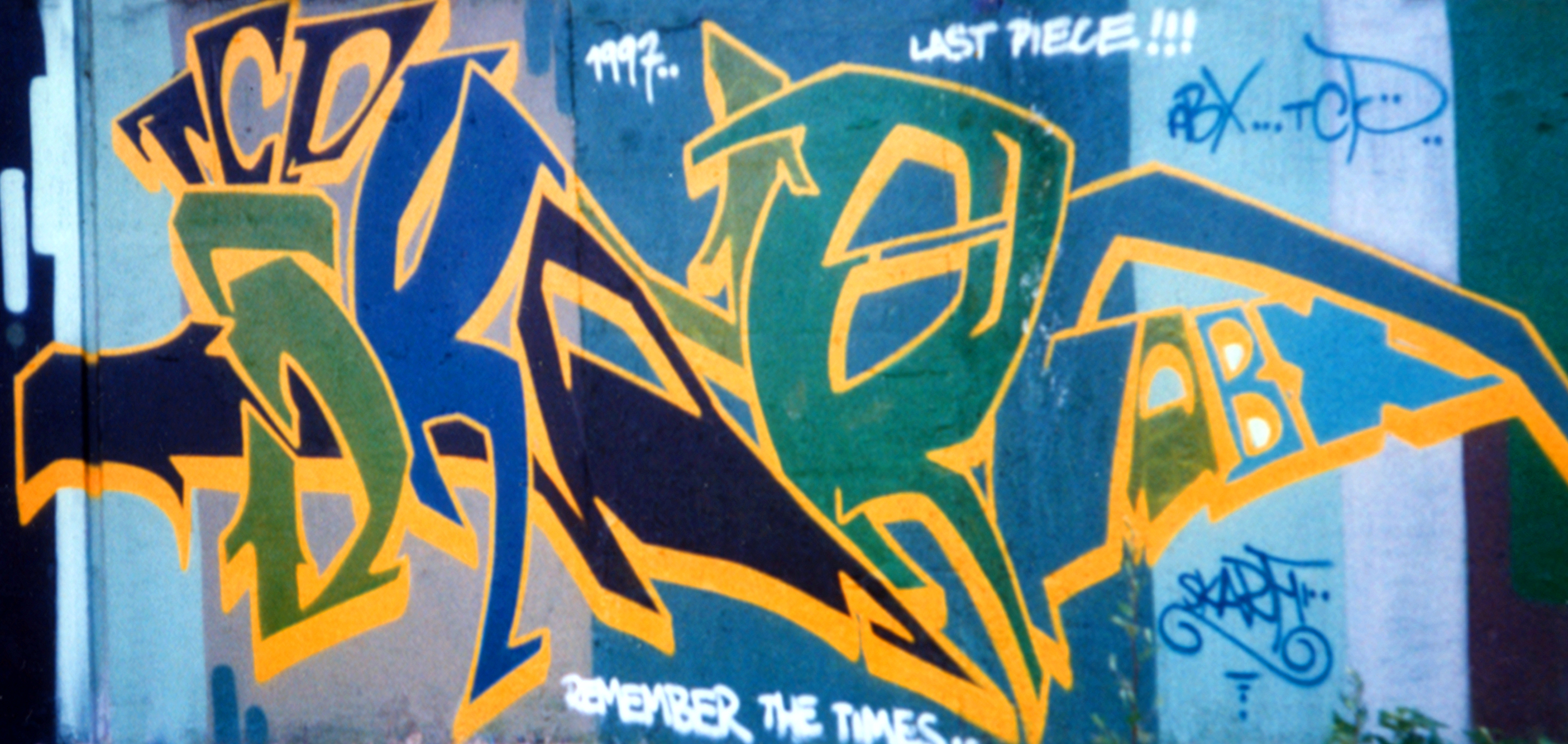
Skarf, TCP crew, ABX crew, 1997

Jan Zajíček was born on 4 March 1977 in Prague, Czechoslovakia. He studied fine art at the Václav Hollar School of Art and film directing at the Film and TV School of the Academy of Performing Arts in Prague (FAMU). In 1992, he began to create graffiti art, one of the earliest graffiti artists in Czechoslovakia (under the pseudonym "Scarf" or "Skarf"). His experience with graffiti later influenced his strongly visual cinematic style, characterised by its combination of live-action with animation and visual effects. Between 1993 and 2000, he was a member of the Czech hip hop group WWW, which played in Prague venues including Alterna Komotovka, RC Bunkr, ROXY, and Rock Café, and in 1996 supported Sinéad O'Connor. During his studies and after graduation, he was a lecturer of experimental audio-visual production at the Josef Škvorecký Literary Academy. Since 2010, he has been a resident at the MeetFactory Contemporary Art Centre.

== Career ==
=== Music videos ===
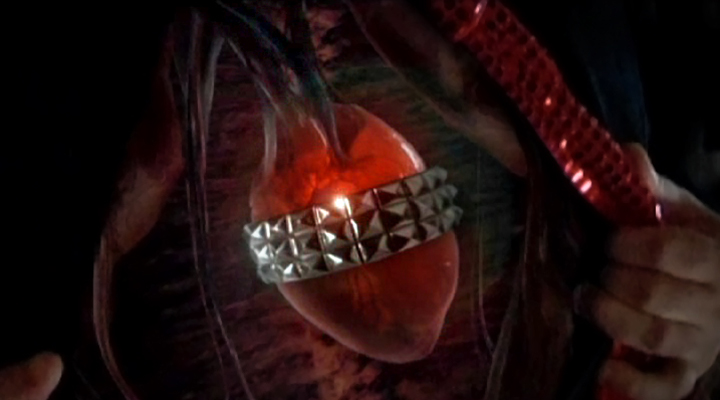
Still from The Sign of Punk (Czech: Známka punku), 2005

Zajíček has directed several award winning music videos. His first video, for the song "Známka punku" (The Sign of Punk) by the Czech punk band Visací zámek, was named Best Music Video of the Year by the Czech Music Academy. Other videos that received attention included Sunshine's "Days Will Never Be the Same", and "Meleme, meleme kávu" (Grinding the Coffee) by Czech hip hop artists Hugo Toxxx and Vladimir 518, which received Filter magazine's award for Best Music Video of the Year, and was selected by the International Short Film Festival Oberhausen for screening during its MuVi programme in 2010.

=== Theatre and stage design ===
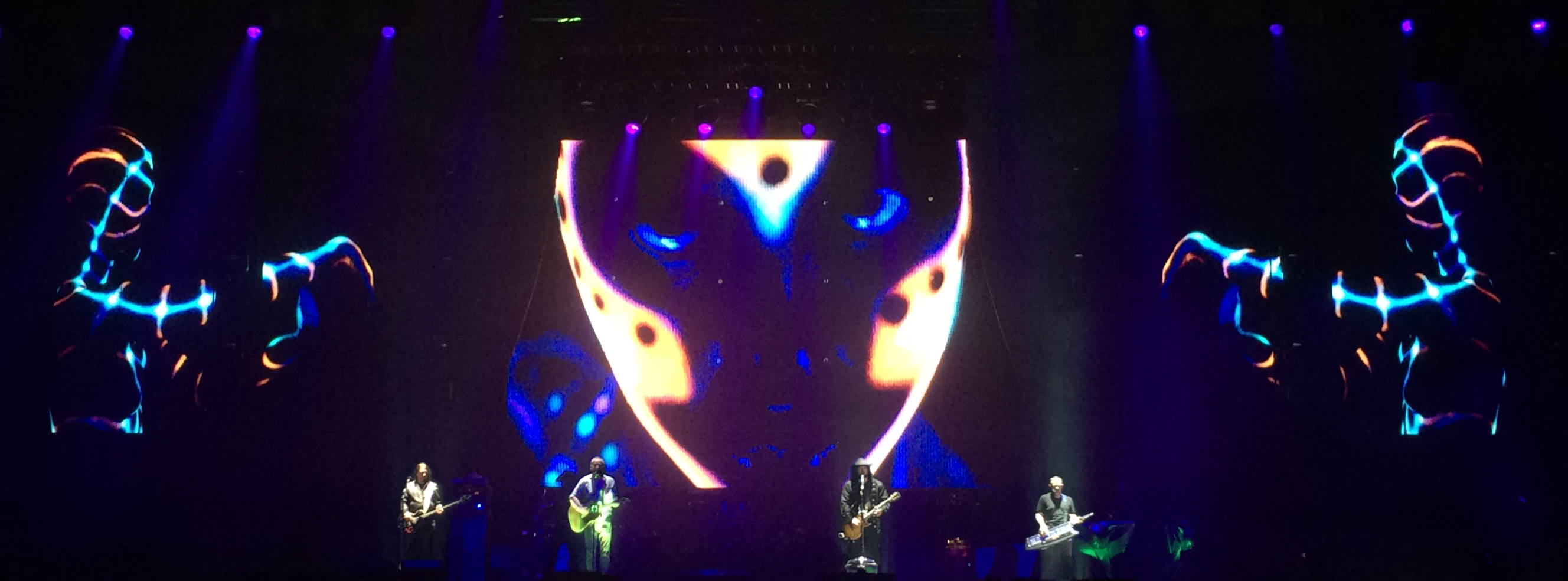
The Lucie 2014 Megatour, O2 Arena Prague

From 2004 to 2013, Zajíček worked as a director and animator with several theatre groups, including Theatre XXL, VerTeDance, the National Theatre and the State Opera. In 2012, he created video content for the 60 metre screen at the Czech House for the 2012 Summer Olympics in London, United Kingdom. Along with Tomáš Mašín, he was also the co-director of Czech rock band Lucie's 2014 concert tour.

=== Film ===
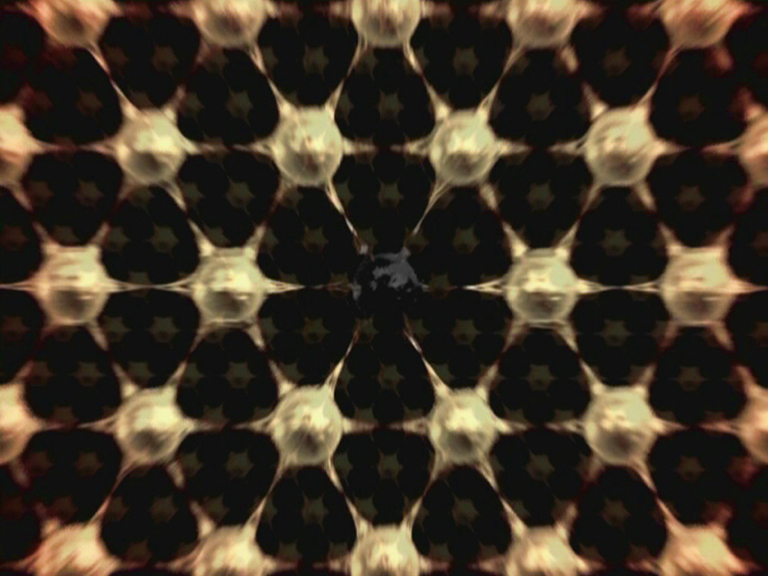
Still from The End of the Individual (Czech: Konec jedince), 2002

In 2003, Zajíček produced a short experimental student film, The End of the Individual (Czech: Konec jedince), a study of the social structure of society on a model of one's own death. The film is a combination of 3D animation and live-action with a non-linear narrative. The film received several awards and was received positively internationally. In 2010, he created the short video montage Polys and contributed to the Czech pavilion at Expo 2010 in Shanghai, China.

He has also directed several commercials (for General Electric, ING, Nike, Skoda Auto, Kia Motors) and co-edited several documentaries. In 2011, he edited a documentary about the impact of corporate psychopaths upon society, and how the overuse of anti-depressants can result in erratic behavior; entitled I Am Fishead, it featured Peter Coyote, Philip Zimbardo, Václav Havel, Nicholas Christakis, Robert D. Hare and Christopher J. Lane. He was a co-creator (with rapper Vladimir 518) of the Czech TV documentary series Kmeny (Tribes), about urban subcultures, and in 2015, he wrote and directed the show's episode about hackers. In 2016, he wrote and co-directed (with the female Czech graffiti artist Sany) a documentary about female graffiti entitled Girl Power, the first documentary on this topic. It starred Martha Cooper, Lady Pink, and others, and was screened at cinemas and festivals all around the globe.

== Awards ==
- 1999 – Eurovideo 99 Malaga - Honorable Mention (won) / Caramel Is Sugar That Will Never Recover (Czech: Karamel je cukr, co už se neuzdraví)
- 2002 – FAMU Festival - Best Sound Award (won) / The End of the Individual (Czech: Konec jedince)
- 2003 – A. N. Stankovič Award - Solitaire d’Or (won) / The End of the Individual (Czech: Konec jedince)
- 2003 – IFF Karlovy Vary - Best Student Film Collection Award (won) / The End of the Individual (Czech: Konec jedince), shared with V. Kadrnka and H. Papírníková
- 2005 – Sazka Dance Award (won) / Silent Talk (Czech: Tichomluva), VerTeDance
- 2006 – Czech Music Academy Award - Best Music Video of the Year (won) / "Známka punku" (The Sign of Punk)
- 2007 – Óčko Music TV Award - Best Music Video of the Year (nominated) / "Chvátám" (Rush)
- 2008 – Filter Mag Award - Best Music Video of the Year (won) / Days Will Never Be the Same
- 2008 – Óčko Music TV Award - Best Music Video of the Year (nominated) / Days Will Never Be the Same
- 2008 – Žebřík Award - Best Music Video of the Year (nominated) / Days Will Never Be the Same
- 2009 – Filter Mag Award - Best Music Video of the Year (won) / "Meleme, meleme kávu" (Grinding the Coffee)
- 2016 – UNERHÖRT Film Festival Hamburg - Best Film Prize (won) / Girl Power

== Work ==
=== Direction and screenwriting filmography ===
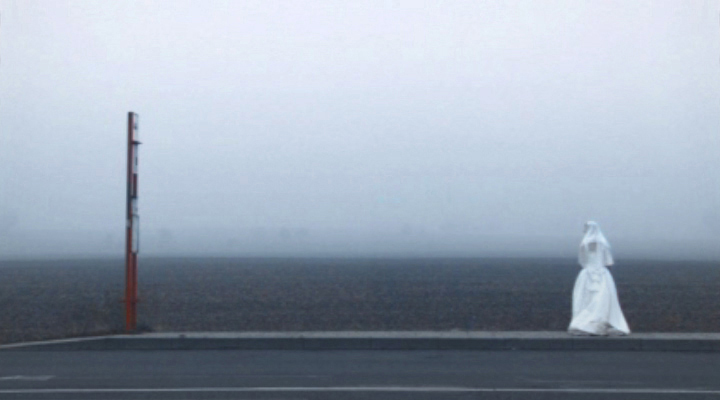
Still from Break My Heart Please! ('The Bride'), 2006

- 2002 – The End of Individual (Czech: Konec jedince) / short
- 2003 – Off Off / documentary TV series
- 2003 – Operation In/Out (Operace In/Out) / documentary
- 2006 – Break My Heart Please! / short dance film series
- 2012 – Then And Now (Czech: Tehdy a teď) / documentary
- 2015 – Tribes: Hackers (Czech: Kmeny: Hackeři) / documentary
- 2016 – Girl Power / documentary

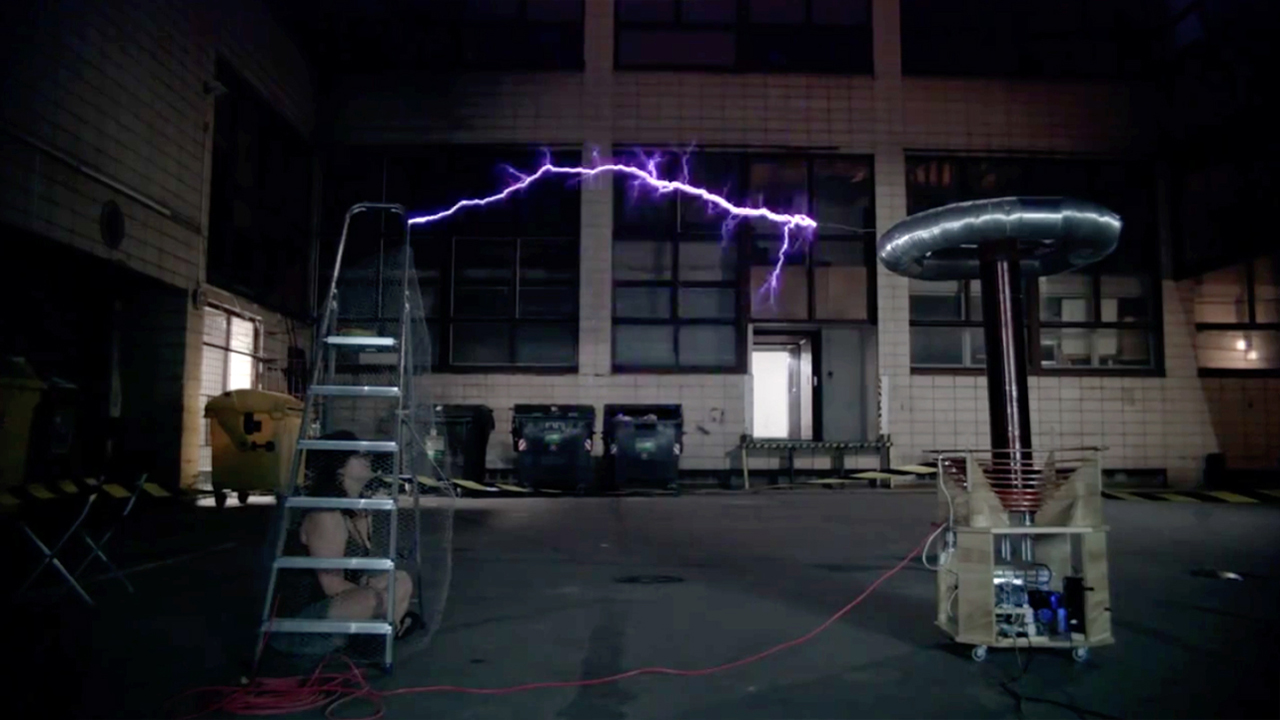
Still from Tribes - Hackers (Czech: Kmeny – Hackeři), 2015

=== Music videos ===
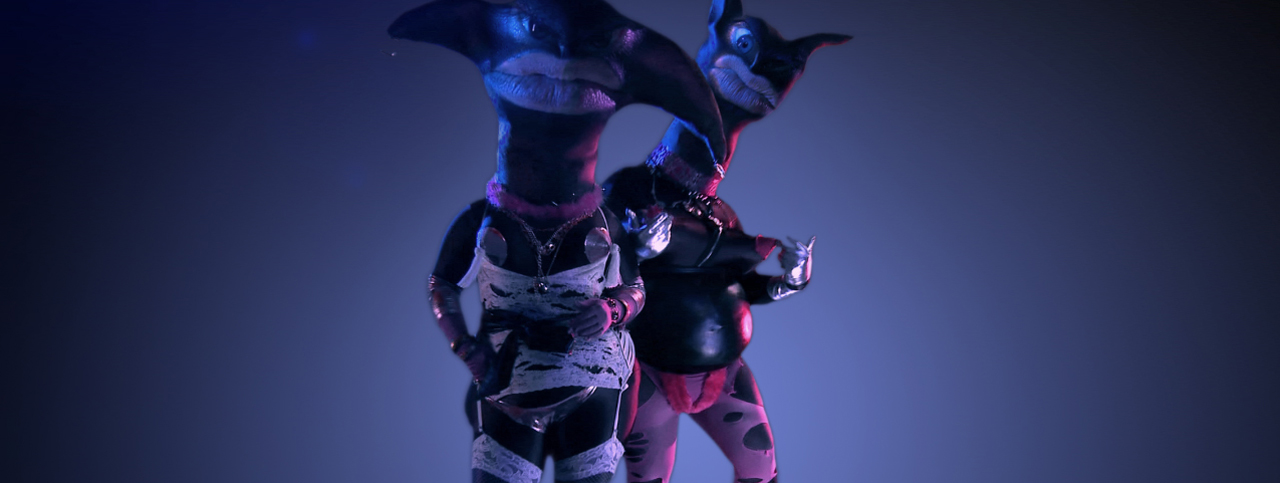
Still from Grinding the Coffee (Czech: Meleme, meleme kávu), 2009

- 1998 – WWW / The Caramel Is Sugar That Will Never Recover (Czech: Karamel je cukr, co už se neuzdraví)
- 2005 – Padlock (Visací Zámek) / The Sign of Punk (Czech: Známka punku)
- 2006 – Pio Squad / Rush (Czech: Chvátám)
- 2006 – PSH / The Year of PSH (Czech: Rok PSH)
- 2008 – Sunshine / Days Will Never Be The Same
- 2009 – Hugo Toxxx & Vladimir518 / Grinding the Coffee (Czech: Meleme, meleme kávu)
- 2011 – Padlock (Czech: Visací Zámek) / 50

=== Edit ===
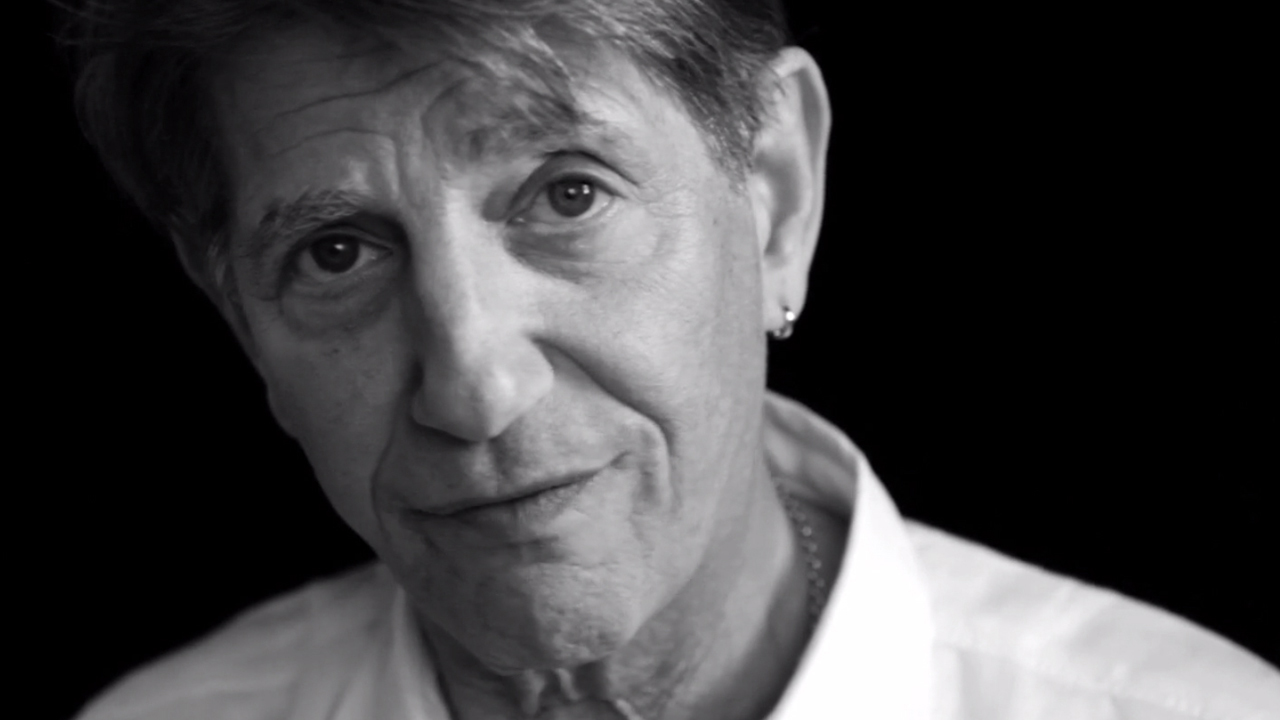
Peter Coyote in I Am Fishead, 2011

- 2002 – Elusive Butterfly (Czech: Nepolapitelný motýl) / documentary
- 2008 – The Anatomy of Gag (Czech: Anatomie gagu) / short
- 2009 – Extraordinary Life Stories - Josef Abrhám (Czech: Neobyčejné životy - Josef Abrhám) / TV documentary
- 2011 – I Am Fishead / documentary
- 2013 – Hotelier / documentary
- 2014 – Magical Dramatic Club (Czech: Magický Činoherní klub) / TV documentary series

=== Theatre performances (cooperation) ===
- 2003 – Hypermarket / The National Theatre
- 2004 – Eldorado / The National Theatre
- 2004 – The Queen of Spades (Russian: Пиковая дама) / The State Opera
- 2004 – Silent Talk (Czech: Tichomluva) / VerTeDance
- 2006 – Break My Heart Please! / Theatre XXL
- 2012 – Czech House / 2012 Summer Olympics in London, United Kingdom
- 2013 – War with the Newts (Czech: Válka s mloky) / The State Opera
- 2013 – Krabat – The Sorcerer's Apprentice (Czech: Čarodějův učeň) / The National Theatre
- 2014 – The Lucie 2014 Megatour

== Festivals and exhibitions ==
- 2002 – Febiofest, Prague, the Czech Republic (The End of Individual / Czech: Konec jedince)
- 2003 – Anthology Film Archive, New York City, USA (The End of Individual / Czech: Konec jedince)
- 2003 – Karlovy Vary International Film Festival, the Czech Republic (The End of Individual / Czech: Konec jedince)
- 2003 – Dahlonega International Film Festival, Georgia, USA (The End of Individual / Czech: Konec jedince)
- 2008 – Chelsea Art Museum / Sonicself, New York City, USA (The End of Individual / Czech: Konec jedince)
- 2008 – Bolzano ShortFilm Festival, Italy (Rush / Czech: Chvátám)
- 2008 – Brooklyn Film Festival, New York City, USA (Days Will Never Be the Same)
- 2008 – PechaKucha Night, Prague, the Czech Republic
- 2010 – 56th International Short Film Festival Oberhausen, Germany (Grinding the Coffee / Czech: Meleme, meleme kávu)
- 2010 – DOX Centre for Contemporary Art, Prague, the Czech Republic (Polys)
- 2010 – Expo 2010, Shanghai, China (Polys)
- 2015 – AFO International Festival of Science Documentary Films, Olomouc, the Czech Republic (Tribes: Hackers / Czech: Kmeny: Hackeři)
- Girl Power (2016): Red Gallery London, United Kingdom, Urban Art Fair Paris, France, Cinema L'Ecran Saint-Denis, France, American Cosmograph Toulouse, France, Expo Charleroi Tattoo’moi 1 Graffiti, Belgium, Urban Spree Berlin, Germany, Friedrich Wilhelm Murnau Foundation Wiesbaden, Germany, Milla Club Munchen, Germany, IFZ Leipzig, Germany, Film Festival Essen, Germany, Platzprojekt Hannover, Germany, Culture centrum Kiel, Germany, UNERHÖRT Film Festival Hamburg, Germany, Frameout Film Festival Vienna, Austria, Kuns Festival Oslo, Norway, Helsinki International Film Festival, Finland, Stencibility Festival Tartu, Estonia, International Film Festival 86 Slavutych, Ukraine, Artmossphere Moscow, Russia, Artmossphere Saint Petersburg, Russia, Cultural Institution Krajn, Slovenia, Blart festival, Bosna and Hercegovina, Colombian Urban Art Film Festival Bogota, Colombia, De Cine MÁS Managua, Nicaragua, Redfern Community Centre Sydney, Australia & StayFly Sydney, Australia.

== Literature ==
- Martina Overstreet: In Graffiti We Trust. Praha: Mladá fronta 2006, 230 pages ISBN 80-204-1325-1 (in Czech)
