= Petr Váša =

Czech poet, musician, and actor

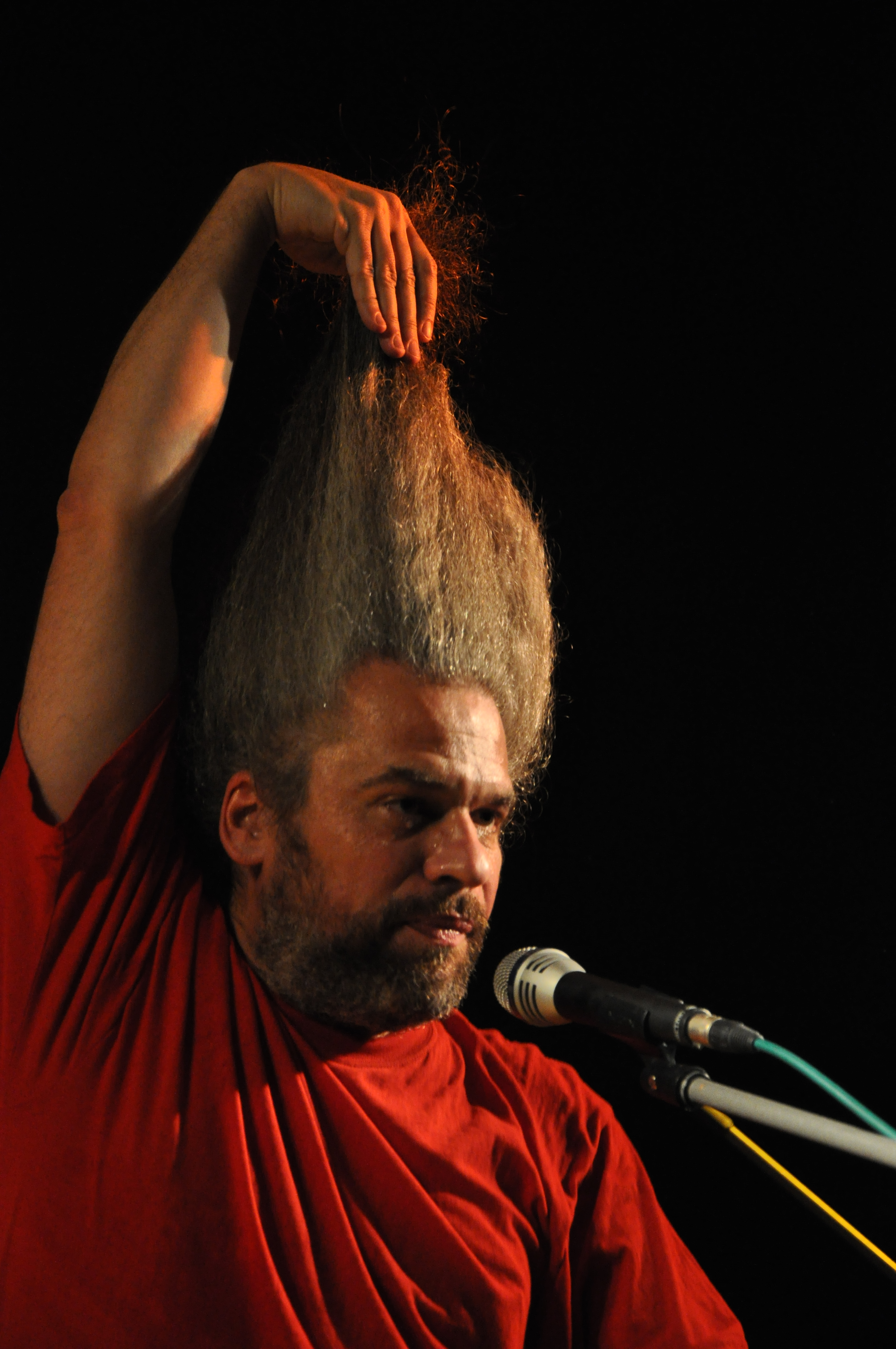
- Petr Váša in 2011 with Ty Syčáci

Background information
- Born: 7 February 1965 (age 61)
- Occupations: Musician, songwriter, poet, artist, actor, performer
- Member of: Ty Syčáci; Jasná Páka
- Website: Official website

Petr Váša (born 7 February 1965 in Brno, Czechoslovakia) is a Czech poet, rock singer-songwriter, experimental actor, artist and educator. In 1985 he founded his first band called Z kopce (Czech "downhill"). From 1999 he performed with Ty Syčáci. He is also a member of the rock band Jasná Páka.

== Bibliography ==
- 1994 Texty, básně, poémes physiques
- 2005 Návrat Plavce Jindřicha
- 2011 Fyzické básnictví (with DVD)

== Discography ==
- 1998 Cirkus-Chaos-Minaret (Wolf Records)
- 2000 Máj v dubnu (Indies Records)
- 2001 Lék a jed (Indies Records)
- 2002 SSSS... (Indies Records)
- 2005 Lišák je lišák (Indies Records)
- 2006 Fysipos (live 2006, recorded at experimental theater Alfred ve dvoře)
- 2007 Manifesto (Black Point Music)
- 2007 Bum bum bum
- 2010 Krása

== Filmography ==
- 2009 Men in Rut
