= Jasná Páka =

Czech rock band

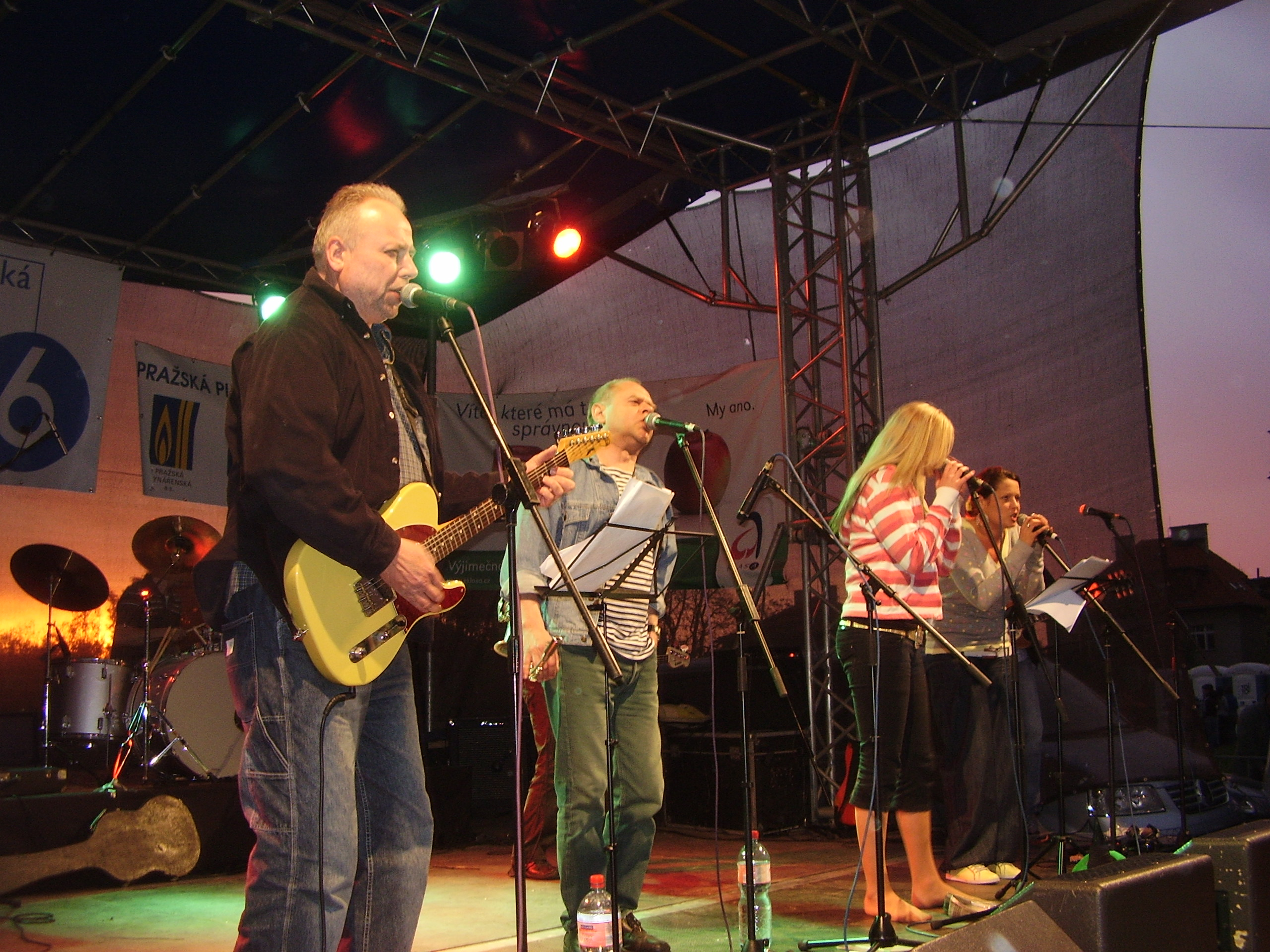
- Hudba Praha performing in 2009

Background information
- Origin: Prague, Czechoslovakia
- Genres: Rock
- Years active: 1981–1984, 2008–present
- Spinoffs: Hudba Praha
- Members: David Koller; Vladimír Zatloukal; Petr Váša; Marek Minárik; Radovan Jelínek; Pavla Táboříková; Magdaléna Krištofeková
- Past members: Michal Ambrož; Vladimír "Dáda" Albrecht; Jan Ivan Wünsch; Karel Malík; Bohumil Zatloukal; Zdena Pištěková; Alena Daňková; Markéta Ambrožová; Petra Studená

Jasná Páka is a Czech rock band formed in 1981 by Michal Ambrož and Vladimír "Dáda" Albrecht. The group was banned in 1984, and most of its members subsequently founded the group Hudba Praha. In 2008, Jasná Páka reformed, with a new lineup. Hudba Praha continues to play as a separate group to this day. Jasná Páka has released one studio album, as well as several live and compilation albums. Ambrož died in 2022.

== History ==
Jasná Páka was formed in 1981 by Michal Ambrož and Vladimír "Dáda" Albrecht. In its first incarnation, the band also included David Koller on drums, Jan Ivan Wünsch on bass, as well as Bohumil and Vladimír Zatloukal on guitars. They were rounded out by a duo of "screaming" female backing vocalists, Zdena Pištěková and Markéta Vojtěchová.

In 1984, Jasná Páka was banned from performing in public. Ambrož wanted to continue playing music, but rather than going underground with Jasná Páka, he retired the original name and formed the group Hudba Praha. Koller and Bohumil Zatloukal left to join 5P (Luboš Pospíšil's band), and Albrecht decided to dedicate himself to painting. Wünsch, Vladimír Zatloukal, Vojtěchová, and Pištěková remained with the new group.

In 2008, Michal Ambrož and Vladimír Zatloukal reformed Jasná Páka with a returning David Koller, adding new members, and six years later, they released their debut (and to date, only) full-length studio album, Černá deska.

Ambrož died on 31 October 2022.

== Band members ==
Current

- David Koller – drums, vocals
- Vladimír Zatloukal – guitar
- Petr Váša – vocals
- Marek Minárik – bass
- Radovan Jelínek – keyboards, guitar, vocals
- Pavla Táboříková – backing vocals
- Magdaléna Krištofeková – backing vocals

Past

- Michal Ambrož (died 2022) – vocals, guitar
- Vladimír "Dáda" Albrecht – vocals
- Jan Ivan Wünsch – bass
- Karel Malík – saxophone, vocals
- Bohumil Zatloukal – guitar
- Zdena Pištěková – backing vocals
- Alena Daňková – backing vocals
- Markéta Ambrožová – backing vocals
- Petra Studená – backing vocals

== Discography ==
Studio albums

- Černá deska (2014)

Live albums

- Jasná páka (1985)
- 25 pecek (2007)
- Černá deska + Stará vlna s novým obsahem (2014)

Compilations

- 10 let Hudby Praha/Jasná páka (1992)
- Jasná páka – od začátku do konce (2001)

Demos and other albums

- Jasná páka – Nashledanou (1985)
- Jasná páka (1990)
