= Janek Ledecký =

Czech musician (born 1962)

JUDr Janek Ledecký
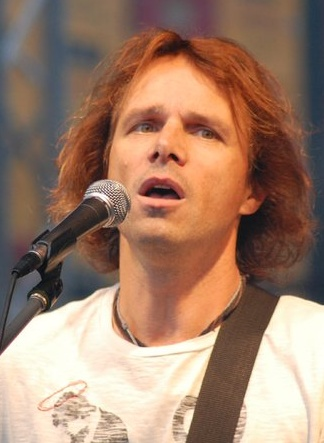
- Ledecký performing in 2009

Background information
- Born: Jan Ledecký; 27 July 1962 (age 63); Prague, Czechoslovakia
- Genres: Alternative rock; pop rock
- Occupation: Musician
- Instruments: Guitar; vocals
- Years active: 1981—present
- Member of: Žentour
- Website: icemusic-ledecky.cz

Jan Ledecký (born 27 July 1962), better known as Janek Ledecký, is a Czech singer, songwriter, guitarist, and composer born in Prague. After graduating from Karla Sladkovského high school, he attended the law faculty of Charles University in Prague, earning a degree in law. Since 1981, he has played in the multiple award-winning rock band Žentour as lead vocalist and guitarist. In 1992, he launched a solo career, which he maintains to this day, having released over a dozen successful albums. He has also written and performed in several musicals, including Galileo, Hamlet, and Iago.

Ledecký has been a judge on the Czech singing show Tvoje tvář má známý hlas since 2016.

== Family ==
Janek's son, Jonáš Ledecký (born 1993), is an artist, cartoonist, and musician.

His daughter, Ester Ledecká, (born 1995) is a snowboarder and alpine skier. She was double junior world champion in 2013, world champion in 2015, and is a three-time Olympic champion, winning in 2018 and 2022.

Janek's brother, David Ledecký, died of a drug overdose when Janek was still young.

Ledecký is the son-in-law of former professional ice hockey player Jan Klapáč.

== Discography ==
=== with Žentour ===
- Žentour 001 (1986)
- Žentour 002 (1986 - English version of Žentour 001)
- Žentour 003 (1990)
- Žentour 004 (1990 - English version of Žentour 003)
- Žentour 005 (1991)
- Žentour 006 (1991 - English version of Žentour 005)
- Žentour 007 (2014)

=== Solo ===
Studio albums

- Na ptáky jsme krátký (1992)
- Právě teď (1993)
- Některý věci jsou jenom jednou (1995)
- Sliby se maj plnit o Vánocích (1996)
- Mít kliku (1997)
- Na chvíli měj rád (2001)
- Ikaros (2005)
- 12 Vánočních nej (2007)
- Všichni dobří andělé (2014 - duets album)
- Na konci duhy (2015)

Compilations

- Promilujem celou noc (1999)

Live albums

- Jenom tak (1994)
- Sliby se maj plnit...live (2017)
- Unplugged (2019)
- Symphonic (2022)

Soundtracks

- Hamlet (1999)
- Galileo (2002)
- Galileo - Gold Edition (2003)
- Galileo - 2CD Complete Edition (2004)
- Hamlet - The Rock Opera (2012)
- Sliby se maj plnit o Vánocích - 20 let (2016)

Video albums

- Retro life (2006)

== Musicals ==
- Pěna dní (1993)
- Hamlet (music: Janek Ledecký; libretto: Janek Ledecký) (1999)
- Galileo (music: Janek Ledecký; libretto: Janek Ledecký) (2003)
- Vánoční zázrak aneb Sliby se maj plnit o Vánocích (music: Janek Ledecký; libretto: Janek Ledecký) (2011)
- Hamlet - The Rock Opera (2012)
- Iago (2016)

== Awards ==
- Anděl Award - Singer of the year (1996)
