= Beata Hlavenková =

Czech musician

- Born: Beata Morávková; 2 February 1978 (age 48); Czechoslovakia
- Genres: Pop; Jazz; Chanson
- Occupations: Singer, Composer, Pianist, Arranger, Producer
- Instruments: Vocals, Piano
- Years active: 2004–present
- Label: Animal Music
- Website: beatahlavenkova.com

Beata Hlavenková, née Morávková (born 2 February 1978) is a Czech composer, singing pianist, arranger and producer. In June 2020 Hlavenková received an award as a Best female singer at Anděl Awards 2019.

== Discography ==
=== Studio albums ===
- S'aight (2004)
- Eternal Seekers (2008)
- Joy for Joel (2009)
- Eternal Seekers (2012) (reedition from 2008)
- Theodoros (2013)
- Pišlické příběhy (2015)
- Scintilla (2015)
- Bethlehem (2017)
- Sně (2019)
- Žijutě (2021)
