= David Koller =

Czech musician (born 1960)

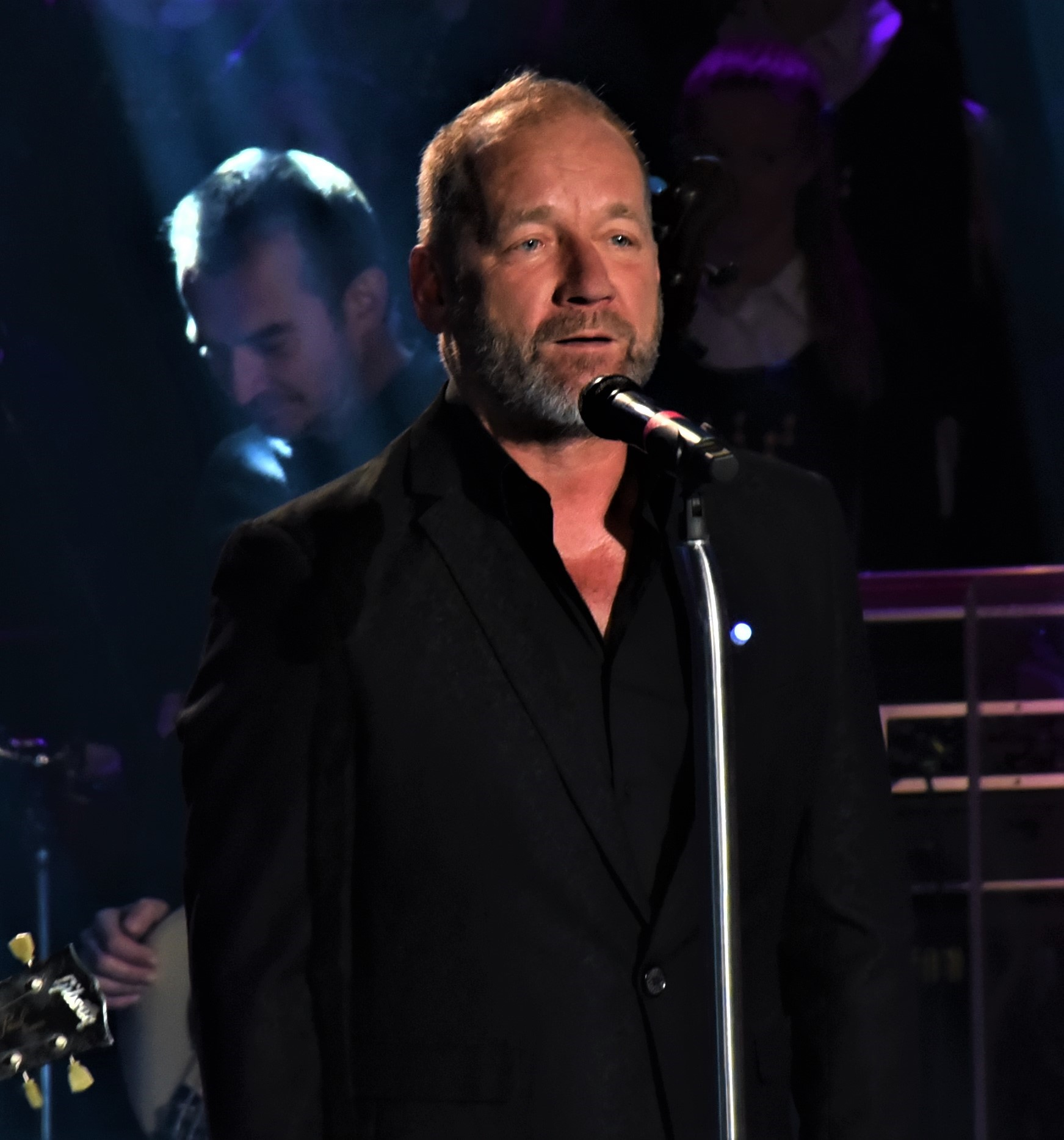
- Koller in 2019

Background information
- Born: 27 September 1960 (age 65); Prague, Czechoslovakia
- Genres: Alternative rock; pop rock
- Occupations: Musician; record producer
- Instruments: Vocals; drums; guitar
- Years active: 1980–present
- Member of: Jasná Páka
- Formerly of: Žentour; Pusa; Chinaski; Blue Effect; 5P; Lucie
- Website: davidkoller.cz

David Koller (born 27 September 1960) is a Czech musician and record producer.

== Career ==
=== Music ===
Koller started his career in the early 1980s as the drummer of Jasná Páka and has also played in various other bands, including Žentour, Pusa, and Blue Effect. He founded the popular Czech group Lucie in 1985 and remained there until 2005, when he departed, due to disagreements with fellow members P.B.CH. and Robert Kodym. The group reunited in 2012. In 2008, he was temporarily a touring member of Chinaski, and he leads his own group, Kollerband. Koller has produced music for Miro Žbirka, Koistinen, Alice, Plexis, Walk Choc Ice, Oskar Petr, Lucie Bílá, and many others. In 2016, he produced the album Srdeční příběh for Michal Ambrož, longtime leader of the bands Jasná Páka and Hudba Praha. In 2019, he supervised the production of the album Hudba Praha & Michal Ambrož. In 2024, Koller announced on social media that he would be leaving Lucie following that year's concert activities, in order to focus on his family and solo band.

=== Other activities ===
Together with Lucie member Michal Dvořák, Koller composed the score for the films Amerika (1994), Poslední přesun (1995), and Mrtvej brouk (1998). With artist David Černý and filmmaker Alice Nellis, he opened the multicultural center MeetFactory in 2007. Koller has made appearances in several films and television productions, including Pražákům, těm je tu hej (1991), Accumulator 1 (1994), and Kancelář Blaník (2014).

== Political views ==
In early 2014, Koller signed an appeal to the Sobotka government, which called for a tougher line towards Russia and the punishment of all minorities in the Czech Republic who have Russian citizenship, namely "immediate suspension of visas for Russian citizens, abolishing the possibility of dual citizenship for Russian citizens, freezing of accounts of Russian citizens in the Czech Republic in order to verify the legality of these deposits, stopping the entry of Russian business and capital into the Czech Republic".

According to Koller, "The government should make sure we choose Europe and NATO and not Russians. We express this through song, but everyone should realize that we play guitars that were made mostly in America. What has Russia given us?"

== Personal life ==
Koller's son Adam is also a drummer and occasionally plays in bands with his father.

== Discography ==
=== Solo ===
- David Koller (1993)
- Kollerband (2003)
- Kollerband – dual disc (2005)
- Nic není na stálo (2006)
- Teď a tady (2010)
- Kollerband – Unplugged (2012)
- ČeskosLOVEnsko (2015)
- David Koller & Friends (2016)

=== with Žentour ===
- Žentour 001 (1986)

=== with Pusa ===
- Pusa (1996)

=== with Lucie ===
Studio albums

- Lucie (1990)
- In the Sky (1991)
- Černý kočky mokrý žáby (1994)
- Pohyby (1996)
- Větší než malé množství lásky (1998)
- Slunečnice (2000)
- Dobrá kočka která nemlsá (2002)
- EvoLucie (2018)

Compilations

- Vše nejlepší 88–99 (1999)
- The best of (2009)
- Platinum Combo 1990–2013 (2013)

Live albums

- Lucie Live! red and blue double album (1992); re-issue (1998)
- Lucie v opeře double album (2003)
