= Lucie (band) =

Czech rock band

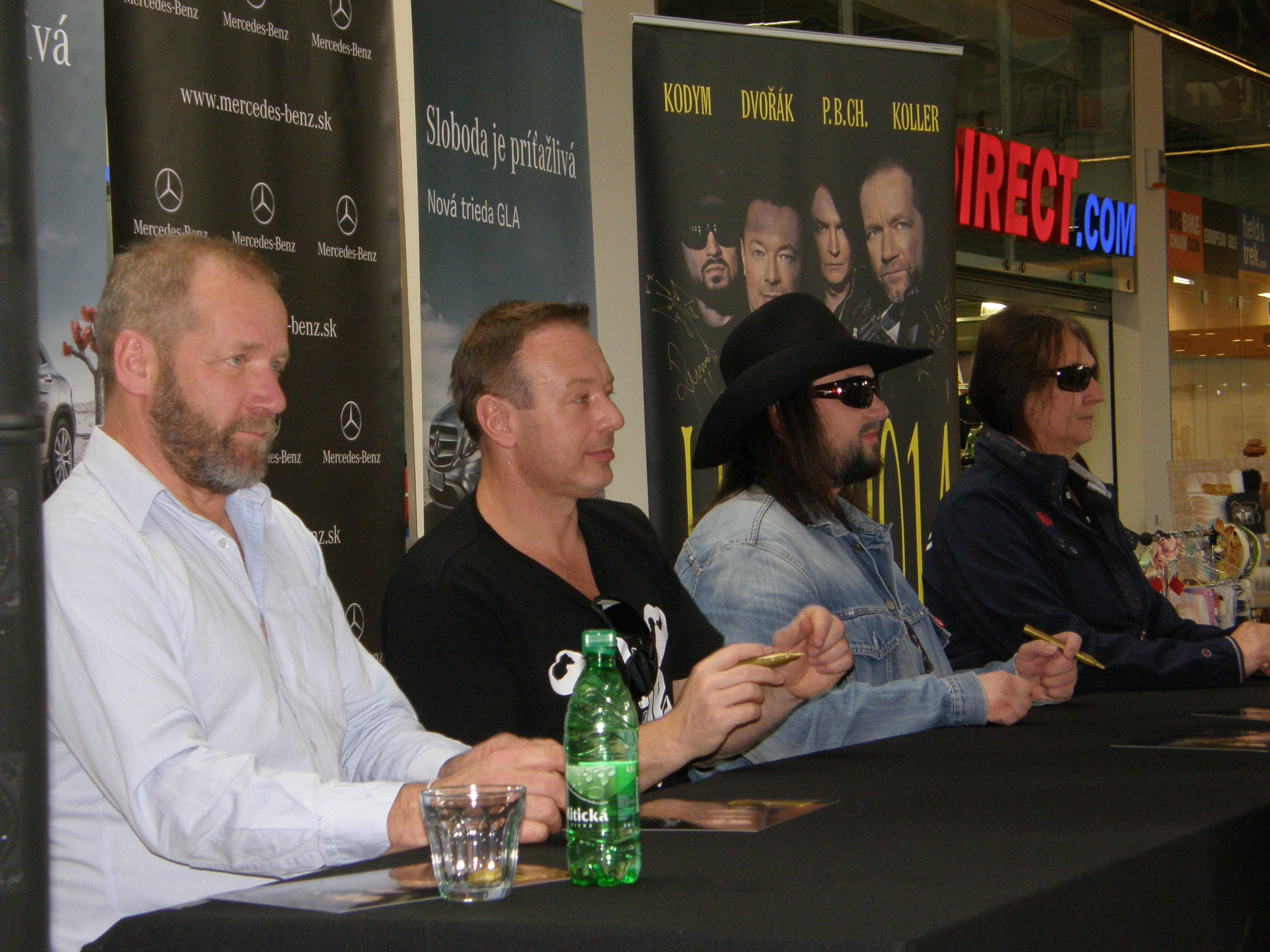
- Lucie in 2014

Background information
- Origin: Prague, Czechoslovakia
- Genres: Alternative rock; hard rock; pop rock
- Years active: 1985–2004; 2012–present
- Spinoffs: Wanastowi Vjecy
- Members: Robert Kodym; P.B.CH.; Michal Dvořák; Viktor Dyk; Štěpán Smetáček
- Past members: Petr Franc; Michal Penk; Tomáš Waschinger; Marek Minárik; David Koller
- Website: lucie.cz

Lucie (Czech pronunciation: [ˈlutsɪ(j)ɛ]) is a Czech rock band from Prague, formed in 1985. After an initial period of stabilization of band members and musical style (1985–1987), they entered the music scene with their debut single, "Pár fíglů", in 1988. Over the next sixteen years, the band released seven studio albums, two live records, and one compilation. Lucie was on hiatus between 2004 and 2012, and in 2018, they issued their latest studio album, EvoLucie.

== History ==
=== 1985–1986: Formation and breakup ===
Lucie was founded by guitarist Robert Kodym and bassist Petr Břetislav Chovanec (P.B.CH.), who had been performing together in the band Prášek, in 1985. They added drummer Tomáš Waschinger and wrote a number of new songs, one of which was the eponymous "Lucie", which was later included on their self-titled debut album. The band was joined by Petr Franc on keyboards, and the last member became vocalist Michal Penk. Kodym, P.B.CH., and Penk all gradually left the group, however, and at this point, the early stage of Lucie ended. Kodym and P.B.CH. went on to launch the band Wanastowi Vjecy, with drummer Adolf Vitáček.

=== 1988–1992: Early albums and hiatus ===
Less than a year after the band's breakup, a revival was organized, with the returning Robert Kodym and P.B.CH., David Koller on vocals and drums, and Michal Dvořák on keyboards. In 1988, Lucie played their first concert, at the Chmelnice club in Prague. In 1990, they released their self-titled, debut album. They followed it a year later with In the Sky, which won them the Anděl Award for band, album, and song ("Černí andělé") of the year. In 1992, the group issued the live double album Lucie Live! and subsequently parted ways once more.

=== 1993–1999: Return ===
Lucie reunited in 1993, this time without P.B.CH., who had decided to continue on a solo path. He was replaced by the Slovak bass player Marek Minárik. A new album Černý kočky mokrý žáby, came out in 1994. This won the band four more Anděl Awards. At the end of 1996, they released the album Pohyby, which won them a Český slavík award, a feat they repeated every subsequent year until 2004.

Their next album, Větší než malé množství lásky, came out in 1998, after which they were rejoined by P.B.CH. A year later, the group released their first compilation album, Vše nejlepší 88–99.

=== 2000–2004: New releases ===
In 2000, the band released the album Slunečnice and followed it with Dobrá kočzka která nemlsá in 2002. In 2003, keyboardist Michal Dvořák was fired and replaced by guitarist Tomáš Vartecký (Wanastowi Vjecy, Kollerband, Daniel Landa). The live double album Lucie v opeře came out in 2004.

=== 2005–present: Hiatus, EvoLucie, Koller's departure ===
In 2005, David Koller left the band, which subsequently became inactive. In 2014, they launched a reunion tour in their most stable lineup of Koller, Kodym, P.B.CH, and Dvořák. A new studio album, EvoLucie, was released in November 2018, and the band went on the road to promote it with an indoor tour of Czechia and Slovakia.

In 2024, Koller announced on social media that he would be leaving Lucie following that year's concert activities, in order to focus on his family and solo band. The remaining members of Lucie had been working with singer Viktor Dyk since February of that year, and in October, they announced him as Koller's replacement, along with new drummer Štěpán Smetáček, who had played with the band in the 1990s and who also plays with Wanastowi Vjecy. They also stated that they were working on a new album, which would be titled R.A.D.O.S.T.

== Band members ==
Current

- Robert Kodym – guitars, vocals
- P.B.CH. – bass guitar
- Michal Dvořák – keyboards, synthesizers
- Viktor Dyk – vocals
- Štěpán Smetáček – drums

Past

- Marek Minárik – bass guitar
- Michal Penk – vocals
- Petr Franc – keyboards
- Tomáš Waschinger – drums
- Tomáš Marek – drums, percussion
- Tomáš Vartecký – guitars
- Pavel Plánka – percussion
- David Koller – drums, vocals, acoustic guitars

== Discography ==
=== Studio albums ===
- Lucie (1990)
- In the Sky (1991)
- Černý kočky mokrý žáby (1994)
- Pohyby (1996)
- Větší než malé množství lásky (1998)
- Slunečnice (2000)
- Dobrá kočzka která nemlsá (2002)
- EvoLucie (2018)

=== Compilations ===
- Vše nejlepší 88–99 (1999)
- The best of (2009)
- Platinum Combo 1990–2013 (2013)

=== Live albums ===
- Lucie Live! (2CD) (1998)
- Lucie v opeře (2CD) (2003)

=== Singles ===
- "Pár fíglů" (1988) (B-side: "To jsem já")
- "Dotknu se ohně" (1989) (B-side: "Nech to stát")
- "Troubit na trumpety by se nám líbilo" (1989)
- "Amerika" (1994)
- "Všechno ti dávám" (1996)
- "Klobouk ve křoví" (1997)
- "Pohyby" (1997)
- "Svítání" (1998)
- "Panic" (1998)
- "Medvídek / Svítání" (1998)
- "Mít tě sám (Remaster '99) / Šrouby do hlavy (Remaster '99)" (1999)
- "Zakousnutej do tebe" (2001)
- "Hvězda (radio edit)" (2001)
- "Srdce" (2002)
- "Pod měděným nebem" (2003)
- "Medvídek 2016" (2015)

== Video albums ==
- Obrazohled aneb daleká cesta VHS (1998)
- Pohyby – live DVD (1998)
- Lucie v opeře DVD (2004)

== Books ==
- Dědek, Honza. Lucie : šrouby do hlavy. Prague : HAK, 2000. 284 p. ISBN 80-85910-28-4.
- Žďárská, Lucie. Můj život s Lucií, aneb pohled do zákulisí. Prague : Hart, 2001. 168 p. ISBN 80-86529-25-8.

== Awards ==
- Silver Bratislavská lýra for "Mít tě sám" – 1990
- Anděl Awards for Best Band, Best Album (In the Sky), and Best Song ("Černí andělé") – 1991
- Anděl Awards for Best Band, Best Album (Černý kočky mokrý žáby), Best Song ("Amerika"), and Best Audio Recording (Černý kočky mokrý žáby) – 1994
- Bronze Český slavík award for Best Band – 1996
- Bronze Český slavík award for Best Band – 1997
- Gold Český slavík award for Best Band – 1998
- Anděl Awards for Best Band, Best Album (Větší než malé množství lásky), Best Song ("Medvídek"), Best Video ("Medvídek"), and Best Pop & Rock Album (Větší než malé množství lásky) – 1998
- Gold Český slavík award for Best Band – 1999
- Gold Český slavík award for Best Band – 2000
- Gold Český slavík award for Best Band – 2001
- Gold Český slavík award for Best Band – 2002
- Silver Český slavík award for Best Band – 2003
- Bronze Český slavík award for Best Band – 2004
- Anděl Awards for Best Album (EvoLucie) and Best Song ("Nejlepší, kterou znám") – 2018
