= Paravany =

2019 single by Siza

Single by Slza
- Language: Czech
- Released: 11 April 2019
- Genre: pop music
- Label: Universal Music
- Composer(s): Lukáš Bundil; Petr Lexa; Oliver Som
- Lyricist(s): Xindl X; Petr Lexa

Slza singles chronology
"Nový obzory" (2018)	"Paravany" (2019)	"Hoď tam trsa" (2019)

"Paravany" is a single of the Czech pop music group Slza. The music was created by Petr Lexa, Lukáš Bundil and Oliver Som, English writer. Lyrics was composed by Ondřej Ládek and Petr Lexa. Production of single was made in London with Brity Nick Atkinson and Edd Holloway.

== Music video ==
A music video was also shot on this single. Director of music video is Jakub Mahdal (from company Jakoby Films).
