= Léto lásky =

Single by Summer All Stars
- Released: 8.5.2016
- Genre: pop music
- Length: 3:23
- Label: Universal Music
- Composer(s): Lukáš Bundil and Dalibor Cidlinský Jr.
- Lyricist(s): Xindl X
- Producer(s): Dalibor Cidlínský

Slza singles chronology
"Fáze pád" (2015)	"Léto lásky" (2016)	"Pouta" (2016)

Léto lásky (in English Summer of Love) is a single by Summer All Stars. It was released for the Šikland festival on May 8, 2016. The song was sung by Slza, Chinaski, Xindl X, Jelen, and Miroslav "Mekky" Žbirka, who together form Summer All Stars. The music was composed by Lukáš Bundil and Dalibor Cidlinský.

== Music video ==
The music video has a total length of 3:41, the pics take 3:23 minutes of a video clip. It includes footage from the recording studio and the Czech summer nature. The video was directed by Martin Linhart.

In two years, it collected over 12.5 million views on YouTube.
