= Holomráz (song) =

Single by Slza

from the album Holomráz
- Released: 24 September 2017
- Genre: Pop
- Length: 3:33
- Label: Universal Music
- Composers: Lukáš Bundil; Dalibor Cidlinský Jr
- Lyricist: Xindl X
- Producer: Dalibor Cidlinský Jr.

Slza singles chronology
"Ani vody proud" (2017)	"Holomráz" (2017)	"Na srdci" (2018)

"Holomráz" is a single from the Holomráz album by the Czech pop music group Slza. The music was created by Lukáš Bundil and Dalibor Cidlinský Jr. and the text composed by Ondřej Ládek a.k.a. Xindl X.

== Music video ==
The music video is about an anniversary celebration, and Petr Lexa does not miss her on time, so he's trying to leave the conference. Actress Anna Kadeřávková played in it.
