= Slza =

Czech pop duo

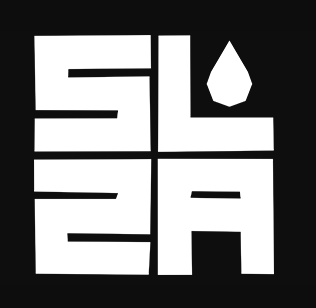
- Band logo

Background information
- Genres: Pop
- Years active: 2014–present
- Members: Petr Lexa; Lukáš Bundil
- Website: skupinaslza.cz

Slza is a Czech pop duo made up of singer Petr Lexa and guitarist Lukáš Bundil. They formed in 2014 and have since released four studio albums.

== History ==
Slza emerged in 2014 with the song "Lhůta záruční", whose lyrics were written by Ondřej Ládek, also known as Xindl X. Their debut album, Katarze, came out in 2015 and included the aforementioned single as well as its follow-up, "Celibát". The title track was also issued as a single and went on to be used as the theme song to the television series Přístav, in which Lexa had an acting role. A fourth single, "Fáze pád", was issued, and a final one, "Pouta". The group received three nominations at that year's Anděl Awards as well as being named Discovery of the Year and Internet Star at the Český slavík awards.

In 2017, Slza released their second album, Holomráz, followed by 3 in 2020. In 2023, they issued their fourth record, Monodrama.

== Discography ==
Studio albums

- Katarze (2015)
- Holomráz (2017)
- 3 (2020)
- Monodrama (2023)

Singles

Year	Date	Single	Album
2014	19 October	"Lhůta záruční"	Katarze
2015	22 March	"Celibát"	Katarze
2015	25 October	"Katarze"	Katarze
2016	7 April	"Fáze pád"	Katarze
2016	8 May	"Léto lásky" (featuring Summer All Stars – Xindl X, Chinaski, Miro Žbirka, and Jelen)	
2016	8 September	"Pouta"	Katarze
2017	23 April	"Ani vody proud"	Holomráz
2017	24 September	"Holomráz"	Holomráz
2018	4 February	"Na srdci" (featuring Celeste Buckingham)	Holomráz
2019	11 April	"Paravany"	3
2019	19 September	"Hoď tam trsa"	3

Music videos

Year	Date	Music video	Album
2016	19 July	"Vstříc nekonečnům"	Katarze
2018	29 April	"Chmýří pampelišek"	Holomráz
2019	15 June	"Nový obzory"	
2020	21 July	"Sobě blíž"	3

== Awards and nominations ==
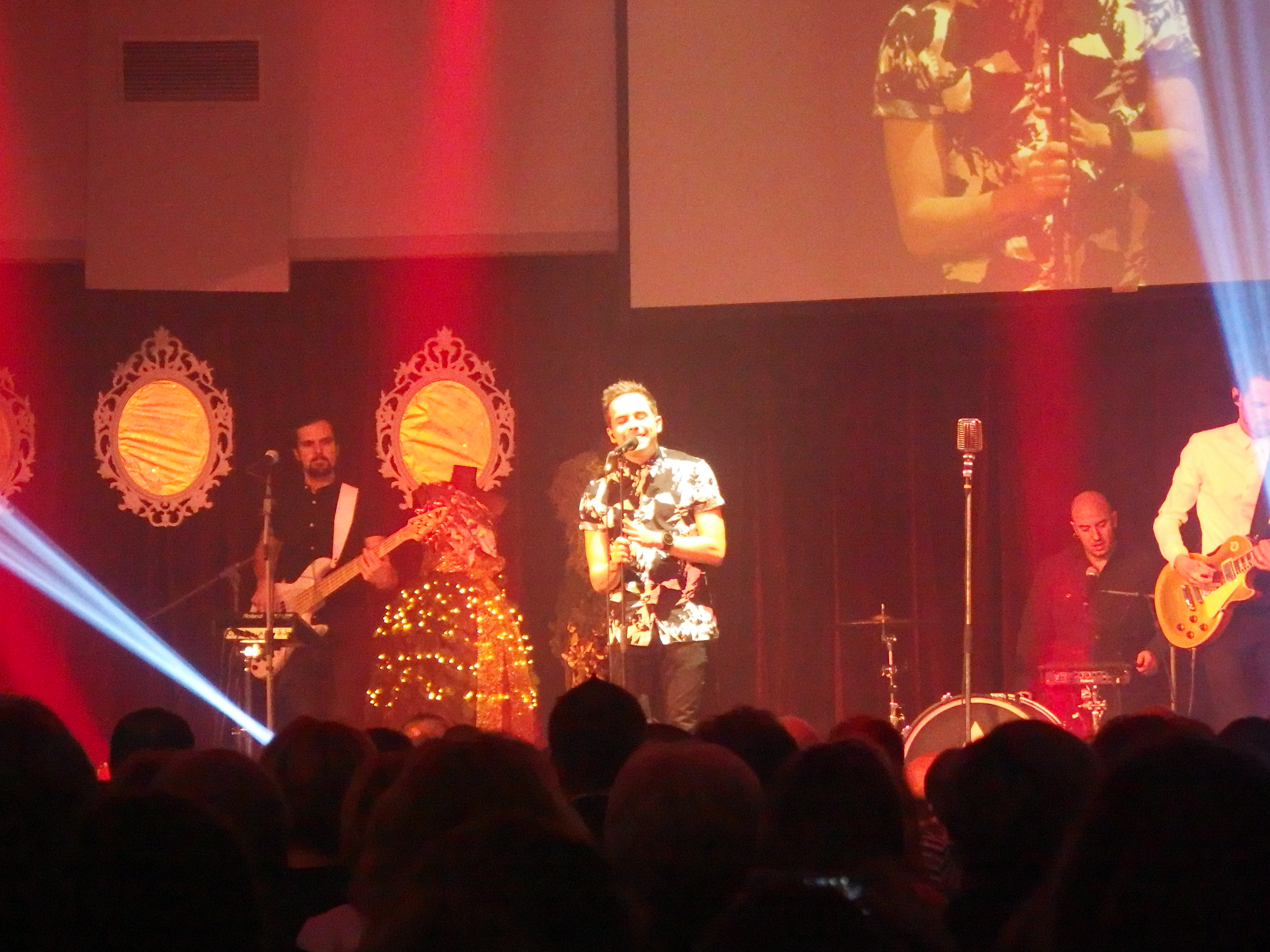
Slza performing in 2015

Year	Award	Category	Result
2015	Český slavík	Discovery of the Year	Won
2015	Český slavík	Internet Star	Won
2015	Music Awards Evropa 2 and Europa 2	Domestic Group of the Year	Won
2015	Music Awards Evropa 2 and Europa 2	Discovery of the Year	Won
2015	Žebřík 2014 Bacardi Music Awards	Composition of the Year ("Lhůta záruční")	2nd place
2015	Žebřík 2014 Bacardi Music Awards	Discovery of the Year	2nd place
2015	Utubering Awards	Most Popular Band	Won
2016	Music Awards Evropa 2	Domestic Group of the Year	Won
2016	Music Awards Evropa 2	Domestic Group of the Year	Won
2016	Music Awards Evropa 2	Evropa 2 Unplugged	Won
2016	Music Awards Evropa 2	Absolute Winner	Won
2016	Žebřík 2015 iREPORT Music Awards	Composition of the Year ("Katarze")	Won
2016	Žebřík 2015 iREPORT Music Awards	Video Clip of the Year ("Katarze")	2nd place
2017	Music Awards Evropy 2	Domestic Group of the Year	Won
2017	Music Awards Evropy 2	Evropa 2 Unplugged	Won
2017	Music Awards Žebřík 2016	Group of the Year	2nd place
