= Fáze pád =

Single by Slza

from the album Katarze
- Released: 13 November 2015
- Genre: Pop music
- Length: 3:16
- Label: Universal Music
- Composers: Dalibor Cidlinský and Lukáš Bundil
- Lyricist: Xindl X
- Producer: Dalibor Cidlínský Jr.

Slza singles chronology
"Katarze" (2015)	"Fáze pád" (2015)	"Léto lásky" (2016)

"Fáze pád" is a single from the Czech pop music group Slza, from their debut studio album Katarze. The single was released on April 7, 2016. The music was created by Dalibor Cidlinský and Lukáš Bundil, written by Ondřej Ládek a.k.a. Xindl X.

== Music video ==
Music video was directed by Vít Karas, with Petr Lexa playing the lead. On April 17, Slza released the making of video on Facebook. In November 2018, the music video had over 12 million views on YouTube.
