= Chinaski (band) =

Czech pop rock band

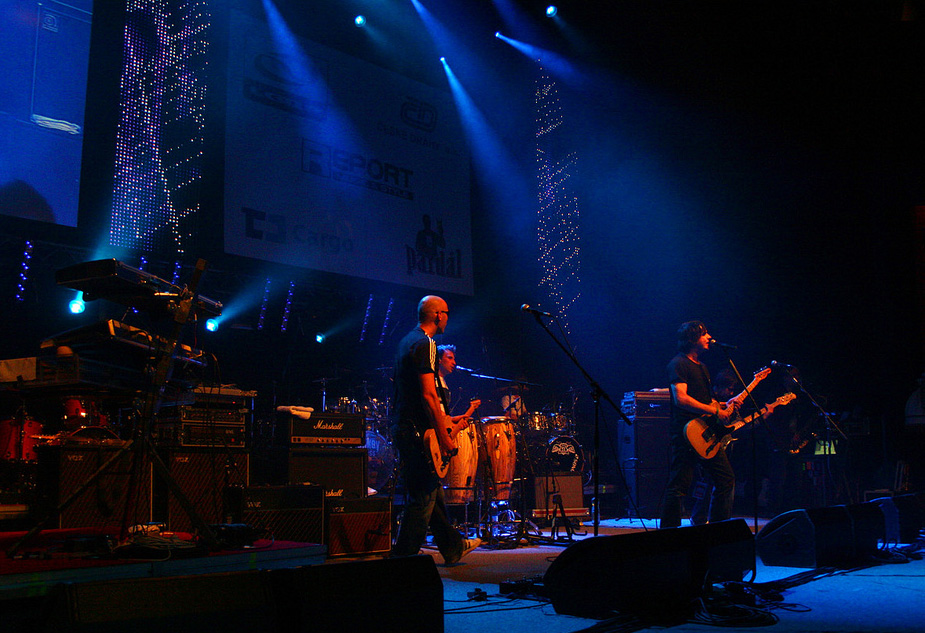
- Chinaski performing in 2007

Background information
- Origin: Prague, Czech Republic
- Genres: pop rock
- Years active: 1987–present
- Members: Michal Malátný; František Táborský; Jan Steinsdörfer; Tomi Okres; Lukáš Pavlík
- Past members: Štěpán Škoch; Ondřej Škoch; Petr Kužvart; Otakar Petřina Jr. Pavel Grohman; Petr Rajchert; Jiří Seydler; Adam Stivín; Martin Kulhavý; Marcela Chmelířová; Robert Jína
- Website: chinaski.cz

Chinaski (Czech pronunciation: [ˈtʃɪnaskɪ]) is a Czech pop rock group. In 2005, they won an Anděl Award, granted by the Czech Academy of Popular Music, and repeated this success in 2007. They have also repeatedly placed in the top ranks of the Český slavík awards.

== History ==
The group was established in 1987 as Starý Hrady (named after the village of Staré Hrady) by Pavel Grohman and Michal Novotný (known professionally as Michal Malátný). Later, they modified their original name to Starý hadry (Old Rags). Longtime frontman Petr Rajchert and Jiří Seydler joined in 1989; both were classmates of Michal Novotný. In 1994, the band renamed itself Chinaski after Henry Chinaski, the protagonist in Charles Bukowski's novels, and released an album with the same name. In September 1995, the song "Pojď si lehnout" (Come to Bed) saw the band's first video, directed by Jan Hřebejk.

Chinaski's second album, Dlouhej kouř (Long Smoke - 1997), brought the band greater popularity as well as a number of nominations for music awards. In 1997, Chinaski released their second video, "Podléhám" (I Succumb), directed by Vladimír Michálek. On 25 May 1998, Dlouhej kouř won Gold certification in the Czech Republic.

=== Early success ===
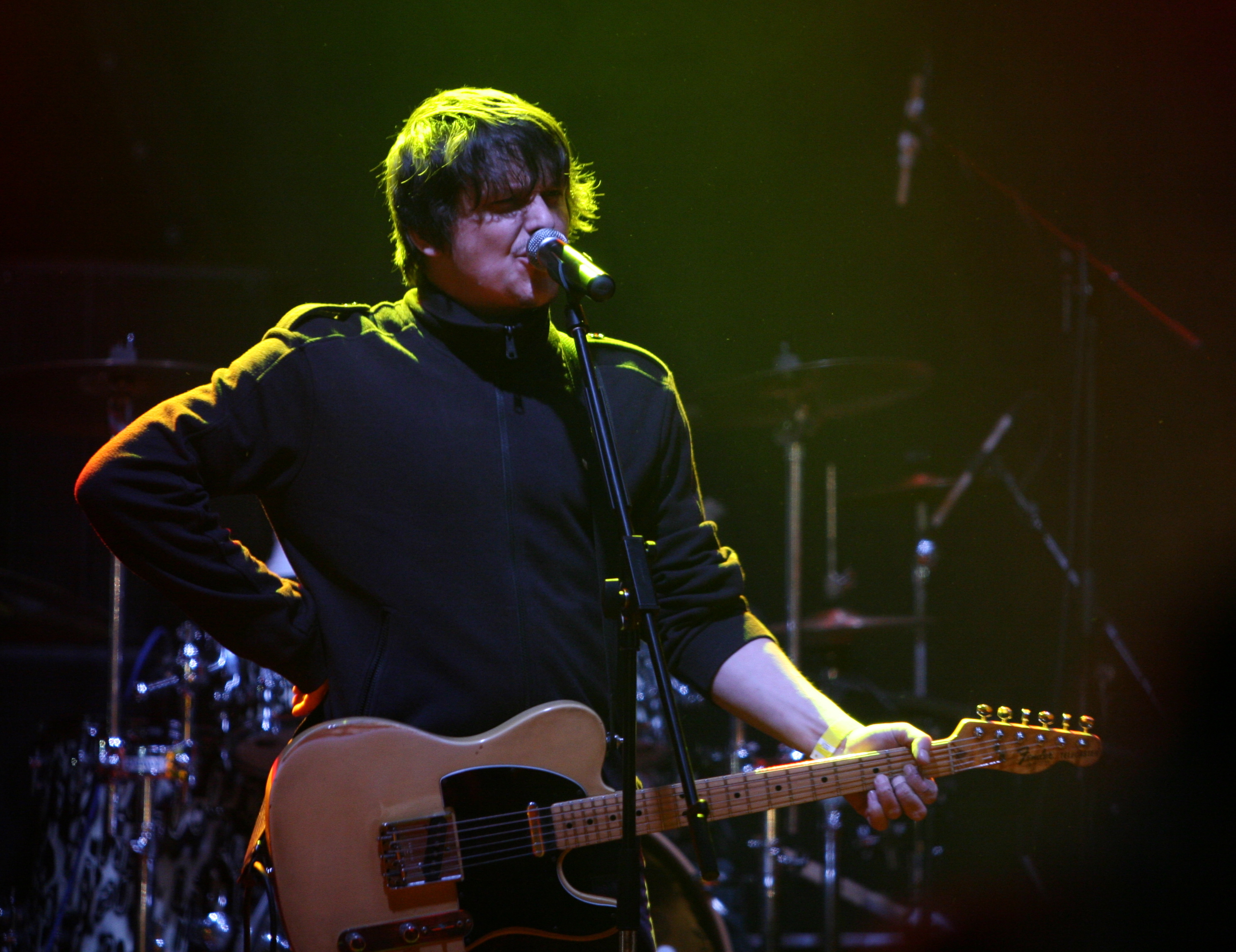
Michal Malátný

In April 1999, the first single from the band's third album was released, titled 1. Signální (First Signal). In 2000, Petr Rajchert left and Michal Malátný became the band's new front man. The group was nominated for Group of the Year by the Czech Academy of Popular Music, finishing third. Chinaski proceeded to record their fourth album, called Na na na a jiné popjevky (Na na na and Other Ditties). The single "Klára" (Clara) was the 14th most successful track on Czech radio in its first week of release.

In the vote held for the Academy Prize, Chinaski took 2nd place behind Monkey Business and ahead of Lucie. The band won fifth place again at the Český slavík awards in 2001. That same year, "Klara" was the seventh most played Czech song of the year. In September 2002, a new album, titled Originál, was released, its name picked by skier Kateřina Neumannová and the Slovak band No Name. The single "Můj svět" (My World) rose to first place on the IFPI Top 40. An animated video was also created for the song. Chinaski subsequently went on tour, which was attended by a total of nearly 43,000 people.

The album Originál was the second highest-selling album in the Czech Republic in the first two weeks of its release. In December of the same year, a concert titled Na vlastních nohou (On Our Own Feet) was held for children from schools hit by summer floods. The new single "Láskopad" (Lovefall) garnered interest from Czech media, assuring Chinaski two top 20 singles. In December 2002, the band won gold and platinum records. They won fifth place at the Český slavík awards again that year.

"Láskopad" was the 7th most popular Czech song in January 2003. At the 2003 Anděl Awards, Chinaski won Song of the Year with "1970". Among other things, the song deals with the generation of Husák's Children. That year, the band began to prepare for the release of a compilation album. On Czech radio, another popular Chinaski song called "Dobrák od Kosti" (Good Man Throughout) got airplay. From July to August, they continued to perform at festivals, including a trip to Chicago. In October, they released their first compilation album titled Premium 1993 - 2003, which was christened in the Lucerna Music Bar in Prague. Chinaski took fourth place in the Český slavík awards in 2003.

=== 2003–2004 ===
The compilation album Premium 1993 - 2003 included 18 of the band's most famous hits and three new songs, "Možná" (Maybe), "Láska a jiná násilí" (Love and Other Violence), and "1970". "1970" appeared in the top rank on the IFPI website. In March 2004, Chinaski launched their "Premium Best of Tour". It was the largest tour in the band's history, seeing them play exclusively large halls. The concerts were enhanced with projections and light shows. In April, they released the new single "Možná" (Maybe). In June and August, the band held a set of open-air concerts and performances at summer festivals.

In November, the band released the album Autopohádky (Car Tales). The album consists of three fairy tales narrated by the band members together with actor Jiří Lábus and musician Lucie Bílá, as well as 8 new songs. The author of the stories is the late Jiří Marek.

On 15 November, the DVD Docela vydařenej den was released. It documents the "Premium Best of Tour" and presents the members of the band in a new light. The new single "Láska a jiná násilí" (Love and Other Violence) was also released at this time. Český slavík 2004 brought the band a historic achievement, as they secured second place in the category Group of the Year and 27th place for Michal Malátný in the category of Best Singer.

=== 2005–2006 ===
In March 2005, Chinaski began a tour to promote Autopohádky. They won several Czech online music prizes and began work on a new album. The first single from that album, "Tabáček" (Tobacco), became the most highly played song on Czech radio within a month. In September 2005, the band's sixth studio album, entitled Music Bar, was released. It sold twenty-three thousand copies within a day of its release, earning it platinum status, and within a week it had become the best-selling album in the Czech Republic.

In November, Chinaski launched their biggest tour to date, which culminated in a concert at Prague's Tipsport Arena. An estimated 70,000 spectators attended the tour. On 10 December 2005 Chinaski won the Český slavík award once more.

On 30 January 2006, Music Bar was named best-selling album of 2005, with 57,506 copies sold. That year, Music Bar was re-released with an accompanying DVD documenting the tour, as well as additional bonus material. The set was titled Movie Bar.

In May, the band launched their Chinaski Music Bar Tour through Slovakia. They followed this up with a two-week concert series in the US. In September, the single "Vedoucí" (Boss) became the most highly played song on Czech radio. Chinaski again left for London to perform at the sold-out Cargo nightclub on 28 October. On 21 October Chinaski baptized a baby giraffe at the Prague Zoo. The band subsequently went on their Chinaski Music Club Tour - a set of shows at the best Czech clubs. The same year, Chinaski added another Český slavík award to their collection in December, winning bronze in the category Best Group. After Christmas, they left for the US again, where another club tour was planned.

=== 2007–2014 ===
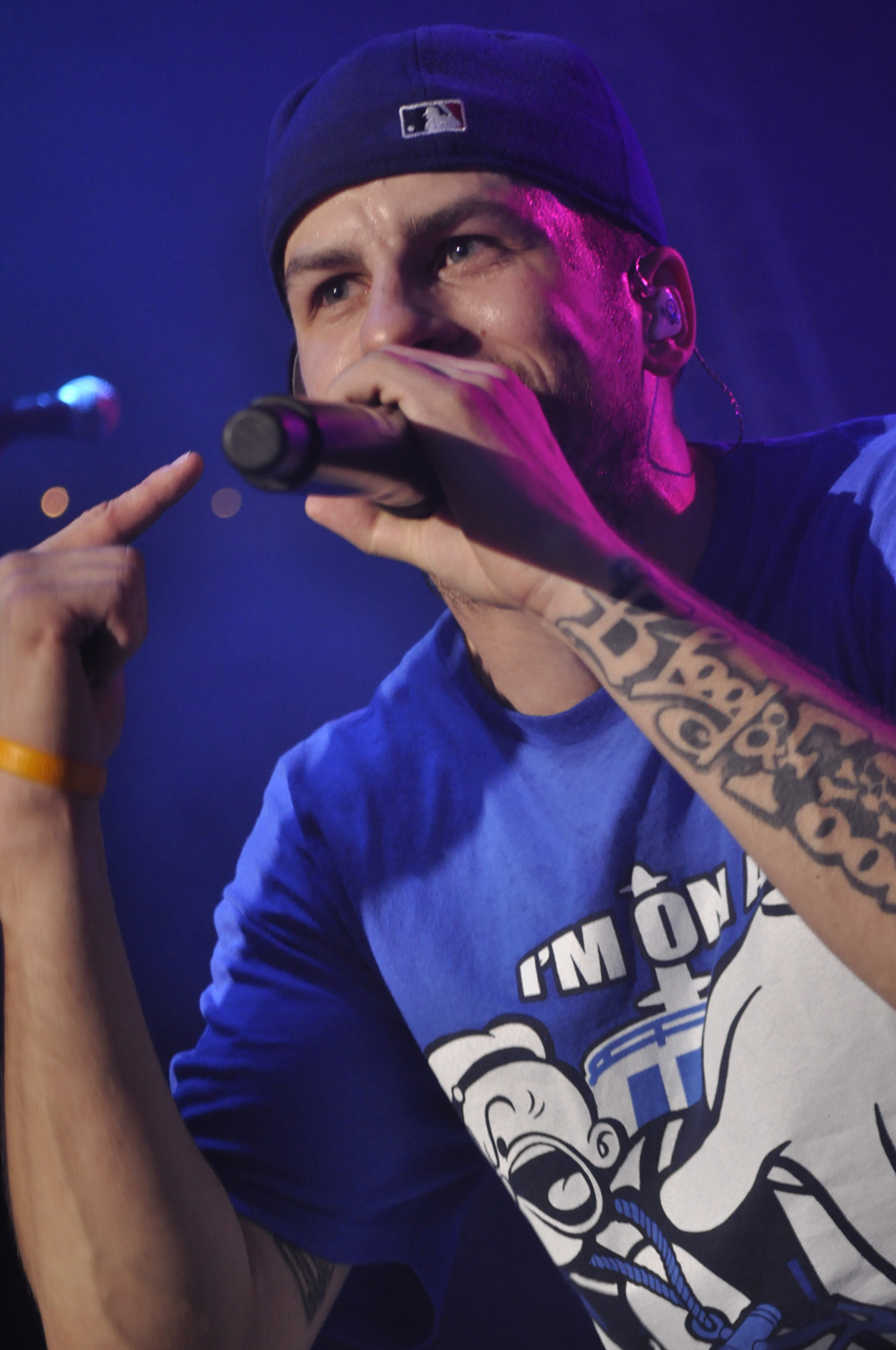
Otakar Petřina, former Chinaski member

Chinaski began the year 2007 with a concert at Chicago's Club Euro, with Zuzana Norisová as a guest. With their video for the song "Vedoucí", they scored on MTV Europe's World Chart Express. They also won the prize for the band of the year at the Anděl Awards. Preparations for a new album with the working title 07 began. 36 songs were written in total, of which 16 made the cut.

The new single "Zadarmo" (For Free) was released on 7 July 2007. A new official fan club was also launched at this time. Chinaski performed at Czech and Slovak festivals throughout the year, including Rock for People in Hradec Králové. After a few weeks, the single "Zadarmo" became the most played song on Czech radio. On 17 September 2007 the new album, titled 07, was released. Within a week, it had gained platinum status. In November and December, the band did a tour of indoor venues. Various promotions were offered on this tour, including an interactive page from which fans could download ringtones, pictures, and other material to their cellphones using Bluetooth before the concert.

At the end of March 2008, the band flew to Košice, Slovakia, where they started a tour with the Slovak band Desmod. During the spring, they recorded a second album in the form of fairy tales for children, titled Autopohádky 2 (Car Tales 2).

On 25 July 2008 tragedy struck when Pavel Grohman, drummer and lyricist for the band, crashed and died on his motorcycle. The band cancelled all concerts until further notice. At the end of August, they finished Autopohádky 2 in the studio and subsequently announced a tour, with David Koller (Lucie) sitting in on drums. Among other things, they rehearsed with a new drummer, Otakar Petřina Jr., who performs under the pseudonym Marpo. In October, Autopohádky 2 and the DVD Když Chinaski tak naživo (When Chinaski Then Live) were released.

In April 2010, Chinaski flew to the United States, where they conducted a mini-tour and made the acquaintance of producer Simon Sidi (Politicon), a British-born stage design expert, who agreed to work with the band on their upcoming fall tour. After returning from the US, they started recording a new album. It was titled Není na co čekat (There's Nothing to Wait For) and came out in September that year. This was followed by another national tour, which began on 7 October in Liberec and saw the band play in six cities.

In September 2013, Chinaski released a compilation album titled 20 let v síti (20 Years in the Network), which proved to be another commercial success. On 6 February 2014 the band celebrated their 20-year anniversary with a giant concert at the O2 Arena and subsequently played at various concerts and festivals.

The band's ninth studio album, titled Rockfield, was released in October 2014.

=== 2015–2017 ===
Nothing significant occurred for the band in 2015 apart from playing at several concerts and festivals. The following year, they held a small set of shows, culminating in October at the O2 Arena with a concert titled Český mejdan s Impulsem (Czech Party with Radio Impuls), together with other famous performers such as Karel Gott, Lucie Bílá, Michal David, Dalibor Janda, Kabát, and others. After a few Christmas concerts, the band announced a one-year break to record a new album.

In the summer of 2016, Chinaski formed the short-lived project Summer All Stars together with Slza, Xindl X, Jelen, and Miroslav Žbirka. They released the single "Léto lásky" (Summer of Love) on 8 May 2016 at the Šikland festival.

In 2017, the band released a new album called Není nám do pláče (We Don't Feel Like Crying), which was a great success. In the fall, they announced an indoor tour, which ended on 16 November at the sold-out O2 Arena with a very successful concert. That same year, they placed third in the Český slavík awards for band of the year.

=== 2017–present ===
Just three days after the sold-out concert at the O2 Arena, Michal Malátný and František Táborský announced the end of Chinaski's long-standing lineup on 19 November 2017. The two were the only remaining members of the band's original makeup; the other four members - Štěpán Škoch, Ondřej Škoch, Petr Kužvart, and Otakar Petřina Jr., had all left the group. The last show with the band's classic lineup took place on 18 December 2017 for the Krtek Fund for Pediatric Oncology. According to the band's official announcement, they did not part ways on negative terms; as a reason, the group cited the loss of "internal chemistry" among its members. A new lineup was announced in early 2018: Lukáš Pavlík took on drumming duties, Tomi Okres joined on bass, and Jan Steinsdörfer became the band's keyboardist.

In 2019, the band released the album 11. FRIHET followed in 2022.

== Band members ==
Current members

- Michal Malátný – guitar, vocals
- František Táborský – guitar, vocals
- Jan Steinsdörfer – keyboards
- Tomi Okres – bass guitar
- Lukáš Pavlík – drums

Past members

- Štěpán Škoch
- Ondřej Škoch
- Petr Kužvart
- Otakar Petřina Jr.
- Pavel Grohman
- Petr Rajchert
- Jiří Seydler
- Adam Stivín
- Martin Kulhavý
- Marcela Chmelířová
- Robert Jína

== Discography ==
=== Studio albums ===
- Chinaski (1995)
- Dlouhej kouř (1997)
- 1. signální (1999)
- Na na na a jiné popjevky (2000)
- Originál (2002)
- Music Bar (2005)
- 07 (2007)
- Není na co čekat (2010)
- Rockfield (2014)
- Není nám do pláče (2017)
- 11 (2019)
- FRIHET (2022)
- 30 (2025)

=== Concept albums ===
- Autopohádky (2004)
- Autopohádky 2 (2008)

=== Live albums ===
- Když Chinaski tak naživo (2008)
- G2 Acoustic Stage (2016)

=== Compilations ===
- Premium 1993-2003 (2003)
- Písničky z filmu Autopohádky (2011)
- 20 let v síti (2013)
- Love Songs (2018)

=== DVDs ===
- Docela vydařenej den (2004)
- Movie Bar (2006)
- G2 Acoustic Stage (2016)
