= Holomráz =

Studio album by Slza
- Released: 3 November 2017
- Genre: pop
- Length: 35:17
- Language: Czech
- Label: Universal Music
- Producer: Dalibor Cidlinský

Slza chronology
| Katarze (2015) | Holomráz (2017) | 3 (2020) |

Holomráz is the second studio album by Czech pop duo Slza, released on 3 November 2017 by Universal Music. It was recorded at the DC Sound studio from March to September 2017, with producer Dalibor Cidlinský. The band's guitarist, Lukáš Bundil, composed the music, with previous collaborator Xindl X contributing lyrics once more. The final mix was done by Vlado Meller, holder of two Grammy Awards. The track "Na srdci" features Slovak singer Celeste Buckingham.

The album was preceded by the singles "Ani vody proud" and the title track, "Holomráz". The record debuted in second position on the Czech charts, according to IFPI.

== Track listing ==
All lyrics are written by Xindl X and Mirka Miškechová; all music is composed by Lukáš Bundil and Dalibor Cidlinský

| No. | Title | Length |
|---|---|---|
| 1. | "Chmýří pampelišek" | 3:33 |
| 2. | "Noci beze ztrát" | 3:33 |
| 3. | "Holomráz" | 3:33 |
| 4. | "Největší z bourců" | 3:38 |
| 5. | "Eskamotér" | 3:19 |
| 6. | "Anestézie" | 3:45 |
| 7. | "Na srdci" (feat. Celeste Buckingham) | 3:46 |
| 8. | "Ani vody proud" | 3:35 |
| 9. | "Lexaurin" | 3:18 |
| 10. | "Smajlík" | 3:13 |
| Total length: | | 35:17 |

== Personnel ==
Slza

- Petr Lexa – vocals
- Lukáš Bundil – guitar

Additional musicians

- Jan Cidlinský – bass
- Dalibor Cidlinský – piano, keys, synthesizer
- Celeste Buckingham – vocals on "Na srdci"

Additional personnel

- Dalibor Cidlinský – production
- Vlado Meller – mixing
- Xindl X – lyrics
