= Katarze =

Studio album by Slza
- Released: 13 November 2015
- Genre: Pop
- Length: 35:09
- Language: Czech
- Label: Universal Music
- Producer: Dalibor Cidlinský

Slza chronology
Katarze (2015)	Holomráz (2017)

Katarze is the debut studio album by the Czech pop duo Slza. Recorded at the DC Sound studio from December 2013 to October 2015 under the supervision of producer Dalibor Cídlinský, the album was released on 13 November 2015 by Universal Music. Cídlinský co-wrote the music with Slza guitarist Lukáš Bundil, and the lyrics were penned by Ondřej Ládek, better known by his stage name, Xindl X. Slza received three nominations at the 2015 Anděl Awards: Group of the Year, Discovery the Year, and Album of the Year.

Katarze spawned the singles "Lhůta záruční", "Celibát", "Katarze", "Fáze pád", and "Pouta".

== Track listing ==
All lyrics are written by Xindl X; all music is composed by Lukáš Bundil and Dalibor Cidlinský.

No.	Title	Length
1.	"Lhůta záruční"	3:36
2.	"Atrakce"	3:37
3.	"Celibát"	3:37
4.	"Etikety"	3:16
5.	"V dešti zášti"	3:30
6.	"Vstříc nekonečnům"	3:40
7.	"Katarze"	3:08
8.	"Fáze pád"	3:16
9.	"Pozice off"	3:27
10.	"Pouta"	3:58
Total length:		35:09

== Personnel ==
Slza

- Petr Lexa – vocals
- Lukáš Bundil – guitar

Additional musicians

- Jan Cidlinský – bass
- Dalibor Cidlinský – piano, keys, synthesizer

Additional personnel

- Dalibor Cidlinský – production
- Ecson Waldes – mastering
- Xindl X – lyrics
