= Nový obzory =

Single by Slza
- Language: Czech
- English title: New horizonts
- Released: 13 July 2018
- Genre: pop music
- Length: 3:16
- Label: Universal Music
- Composer(s): Lukáš Bundil; Dalibor Cidlinský Jr.
- Lyricist(s): Xindl X
- Producer(s): Dalibor Cidlinský Jr.

Slza singles chronology
"Na srdci" (2018)	"Nový obzory" (2018)

"Nový obzory" is a single by the Czech pop music group Slza. The music was created by Lukáš Bundil and Dalibor Cidlinský Jr. and the text was composed by Xindl X.

== Music video ==
A music video was recorded for the single on June 28 and June 29, 2018 in the Klecany studios. The main character of the music video is Martin Novák, as he goes through his youth.
