= Lhůta záruční =

Single by Slza

from the album Katarze
- Released: 19 October 2014
- Length: 3:36
- Label: Universal
- Composer(s): Lukáš Bundil, Dalibor Cidlinský.
- Lyricist(s): Xindl X
- Producer(s): Dalibor Cidlinský

Slza singles chronology
"Lhůta záruční" (2014)	"Celibát" (2015)

"Lhůta záruční" (English "warranty period") is a 2014 single by the Czech band Slza, from their debut studio album, Katarze.
