= Celibát =

Single by Slza

from the album Katarze
- Released: March 22, 2015
- Length: 3:37
- Label: Universal Music Group
- Composer(s): Lukáš Bundil, Dalibor Cidlinský
- Lyricist(s): Xindl X

Slza singles chronology
""Lhůta záruční"" (2014)	"Celibát" (2015)	"Katarze" (2015)

"Celibát" (in English "Celibacy") is a single from the Katarze album of Czech pop music group Slza. The song was released on Spotify.

The video was directed by Vít Karas and was shot at Liblice Castle and featured Barbora Zelená - the final Czech Miss.
