= Pouta (song) =

Single by Slza

from the album Katarze
- Released: 8. 9. 2016
- Genre: pop music
- Length: 3:40
- Label: Universal Music
- Composers: Lukáš Bundil and Dalibor Cidlinský Jr.
- Lyricist: Xindl X
- Producer: Dalibor Cidlínský

Slza singles chronology
"Léto lásky" (2016)	"Pouta" (2016)	"Ani vody proud" (2017)

"Pouta" is a last single from the Katarze album of Czech pop music group Slza. The music was created by Lukáš Bundil and Dalibor Cidlinský Jr. and the text composed by Xindl X.

== Music video ==
A music video containing the materials of the Vevo sponsor was released for this single. The video was directed by Roland Wranik from Slovakia from production company SorryWeCan. Finalist of Miss Slovakia, Lucia Uhrinová, played in the clip with Petr Lexa and Lukáš Bundil. The video has gathered more than 2.5 million views on YouTube.
