= Tučný =

Tučný is a surname. Notable people with the surname include:

- Adam Tučný (born 2002), Slovak footballer
- Michal Tučný (1947–1995), Czech singer
