= Ani vody proud =

Single by Slza

from the album Holomráz
- Released: April 23, 2017
- Genre: pop music
- Length: 3:35
- Label: Universal Music
- Composers: Lukáš Bundil and Dalibor Cidlinský Jr.
- Lyricist: Xindl X
- Producer: Dalibor Cidlinský

Slza singles chronology
"Pouta" (2016)	"Ani vody proud" (2017)	"Holomráz" (2017)

"Ani vody proud" is a first single from the Holomráz album of the Czech pop music group Slza. The music was created by Lukáš Bundil and Dalibor Cidlinský Jr. and the text composed by Ondřej Ládek a.k.a. Xindl X.

== Music video ==
The fans of Slza, Petr Lexa and Lukáš Bundil played it. The music video was filmed in Březnice in April. Filming took three days.
