= Rattlesnake Annie (album) =

Studio album by Rattlesnake Annie
- Released: 1987
- Studios: Pedernales Recording Studio; Chips Moman’s Recording Studios; The Sound Shop; Tree Studios; Reflections Studios
- Genre: Country
- Label: Columbia Records
- Producers: Buddy Blackmon & Rattlesnake Annie

Rattlesnake Annie chronology
Country Livin' (1985)	Rattlesnake Annie (1987)	Indian Dream (1989)

Rattlesnake Annie is a self-titled studio album by American singer and songwriter Rattlesnake Annie, released in 1987 on the CBS label. It reached #49 in the US country charts. Two singles were released from the album, "Callin' Your Bluff", which reached #79 in the US and #51 in the Canadian country charts, and "Somewhere South of Macon", which also reached #79 in the US country charts. The West German branch of Greenpeace adopted her song "Goodbye to a River" as their anthem.

Two other versions were released in Europe in 1983 and 1988 on the Czechoslovak Supraphon label. When Annie went to Europe, she recorded an LP in Czechoslovakia, appeared on East German TV, was voted #1 female country star in Scotland, and was filmed by a Swiss/French crew for The Other Side of Nashville, a MGM/UA documentary. By the time she returned to the US, she was a full-blown European country star.

== Track listing ==
Side 1

1. "Funky Country Livin’" (Lonnie Mack) – 3:46
2. "Sixteen Tons" (Merle Travis) – 2:43
3. "Country Music Hall of Pain" (Rattlesnake Annie) – 3:22
4. "Somewhere South of Macon" (J. Rushing/M. Chapman) – 2:46
5. "Goodbye to a River" (Rattlesnake Annie) – 3:41

Side 2

1. "Outskirts of Town" (Lonnie Mack) – 2:40
2. "Callin’ Your Bluff" (Lonnie Mack/M. D. Barnes) – 2:25
3. "Long Black Limousine" (V. Stovall/B. George) – 3:36
4. "Been Waiting That Long" (Lonnie Mack) – 3:25
5. "Lonesome On’ry and Mean" (Steve Young) – 3:24

== Musicians ==
- Willie Nelson
- Lana Nelson
- Lonnie Mack
- Roy Huskey
- Charlie McCoy
- Johnny Gimble
- Sam Bush
- Jerry Douglas
- Buddy Spicher
- Vassar Clements
- Buddy Blackmon
- Vip Vipperman
- Kenny Malone
- Bobby Thompson
- Byrd Burton
- Mark Casstevens
- Buddy Greene
- David Schnaufer

Backing vocals: Carol Anderson, Mary Beth Anderson, Billy Smith, Terry Smith, Lonnie Mack, Rattlesnake Annie, Buddy Greene, Willie Nelson

== Production ==
- Producers: Rattlesnake Annie & Buddy Blackmon
- Recorded at: Pedernales Recording Studio, Chips Moman’s Recording Studios, The Sound Shop, Tree Studios, and Reflections Studios
- Recording engineers: Pat MacMakin, Larry Greenhill, David Cherry, Bobby Arnold, and Gene Lawson
- Mastered by: Denny Purcell at Georgetown Masters
- Album art direction: Bill Johnson
- Album photography: McGuire
