= Na srdci =

Single by Slza, Celeste Buckingham

from the album Holomráz
- Language: Czech & Slovak
- English title: On the heart
- Released: September 24, 2017
- Genre: pop music
- Length: 3:46
- Label: Universal Music
- Composers: Lukáš Bundil and Dalibor Cidlinský Jr
- Lyricists: Xindl X, Mirka Miškechová
- Producer: Dalibor Cidlinský Jr.

Slza singles chronology
"Holomráz" (2017)	"Na srdci" (2017)

"Na srdci" is a single from the Holomráz album of the Czech pop music group Slza and Celeste Buckingham. The music was created by Lukáš Bundil and Dalibor Cidlinský Jr. and the text composed by Ondřej Ládek a.k.a. Xindl X and Mirka Miškechová.

== Music video ==
The music video was directed by Radim Věžník and it is about Petra and Celeste's divorce who are in the therapeutic session. The video is prompted by their memories. Petr and Celeste try to break out in good. It was shooting at the Martinický Palác.
