= Katarze (song) =

Single by Slza

from the album Katarze
- Released: November 13, 2015
- Length: 3:08
- Composers: Lukáš Bundil, Dalibor Cidlinský
- Lyricist: Xindl X

Slza singles chronology
"Celibát"" (2015)	"Katarze" (2015)	"Fáze pád" (2016)

Katarze is a song from the album Katarze of the Czech pop music group Slza. The song was released on November 13, 2015 on Spotify, Apple Music, iTunes, Deezer, and Google Play. On October 25, 2015 at 18:00, a video clip for a song on YouTube was recorded.

Video clip was directed by Vít Karas. It turned to the Vltava and the flat.
