= Rattlesnake Annie =

American singer-songwriter

- Born: Rosan Gallimore; December 26, 1941 (age 83)
- Origin: Puryear, Tennessee, U.S.
- Genres: Country blues
- Occupation: Singer-songwriter
- Instrument(s): Vocals, guitar
- Years active: 1954–present
- Labels: Rattlesnake Records, CBS, Supraphon
- Website: Rattlesnake Annie

Rattlesnake Annie (born Rosan Gallimore, December 26, 1941) is an American country singer and songwriter. She earned her nickname as a child from her respect of snakes. Rattlesnake began recording music in 1959 and achieved success in Europe. She became the first female country blues musician to tour the Eastern Bloc countries in Europe and released an album with a country singer Michal Tučný from Czechoslovakia. In 1989, she became the first American country performer to sign a recording contract with Sony Music Japan.

== Early years ==
She was born and raised near Puryear, Tennessee, United States, on a cotton and tobacco farm.

Rattlesnake's father had been a country and blues musician, singer, guitar and fiddle and she learned to play guitar at an early age. She earned her first paycheck from singing at age eight, and from then on her goal in life was to earn a living while making music. When she was 12, Rattlesnake and two of her cousins formed a band called the Gallimore Sisters. They performed locally and won a statewide talent contest in 1954, landing them an appearance in Nashville on the Junior Grand Ole Opry and a live television performance.

At age 16, Rattlesnake moved to Memphis and then on to Huntsville, Alabama.

== Recording career ==
Rattlesnake continued to pursue a music career, and in 1974 her first single, "Texas Lullabye", was released. She recorded her debut album, Rattlesnakes and Rusty Water, on her own label, Rattlesnake Records. At the time, it was also rare for a woman to produce her own songs. Rattlesnake reminisced of those early days: "I was breaking down barriers. If I could work like a man in the fields, why couldn't I play a guitar and produce my own records?"

Because of promotion and her focus for International music, her first album became popular in Europe. In the mid-1970s, she became the first female country blues singer/guitarist songwriter to play in the Eastern Bloc countries of Europe. She appeared on television in East Germany, and the West German branch of Greenpeace adopted one of her songs, "Goodbye to a River", as their anthem. In Czechoslovakia she recorded an album, Anka Chřestýš & Poslední Kovboj (lit. Rattlesnake Annie and the Last Cowboy), with Czech country singer Michal Tučný.

In 1991, Rattlesnake became the first American country performer to sign a recording contract with Sony Music Japan. She expressed relief at the agreement, mentioning that "it's always been a hassle because they can never put me in a slot. What bin does the record store use for my records? ... When I signed with Sony Japan and they put me in their world music department, for the first time I felt free and understood."

== Personal life ==
In the early 1960s she moved to Texas, where she met and married Max McGowan. The couple purchased 200 acres of land along the Brazos River. The land had never been cleared or lived on. She and her husband moved to Southern Spain in the 1990s, where they remained for 30 years. In Andalusia she immersed herself in the lives and music of the Romani people and Flamenco.

== Music ==
Rattlesnake has recorded music and performed live on every continent except Oceania In her career, she has recorded in over ten languages, including Czech, Russian, Spanish, Japanese, Maya, German, Chinese, Arabic and English. Many of her songs contain a political message. She says that "Songs are so important to make a statement on issues, and that's how I have used my music. Life is just full of objections, especially when you are a woman." In this vein, she has recorded songs for the Civil Rights Movement, for women's rights, and against the Vietnam War.

== Albums ==
- Rattlesnakes and Rusty Water (1980)
- Anka Chřestýš & Poslední Kovboj (with Michal Tučný; 1983, Supraphon, Czechoslovakia)
- Country Livin' (1985)
- Rattlesnake Annie (1987)
- Indian Dreams (1989)
- Rattlesnake Annie Sings Hank Williams (1990)
- Painted Bird (1992)
- Crossroads (1992)
- Adios Last Cowboy (1995, by Sony Czech Republic)
- Troubadour (1995)
- Some Stories Never End (1997)
- Jak to doopravdy bylo (2001, with Michal Tučný, recorded live in 1982)
- Southern Discomfort (2002)
- I Ride Alone (2002)
- Rattlesnake Annie Sings Willie Nelson (2004)
- The Best of Rattlesnake Annie (2006)
- International Fusion Project (2009) featuring Caroline Perry
- World Full of Love (2012)

== Charts discography ==
=== Albums ===
Year	Album	US Country	Label
1987	Rattlesnake Annie	49	Columbia

=== Singles ===
Year	Single	Chart Positions		Album
Year	Single	US Country	CAN Country	Album
1987	"Callin' Your Bluff"	79	51	Rattlesnake Annie
1988	"Somewhere South of Macon"	79	—	Rattlesnake Annie
