= Husák's Children =

Czechoslovak generation born during 1970s baby boom

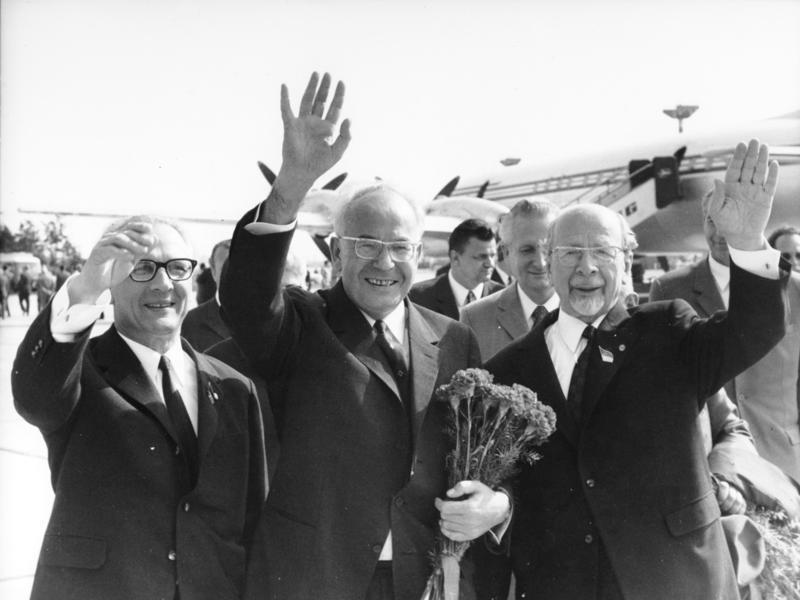
Gustáv Husák (center) on a visit to East Germany, 1971

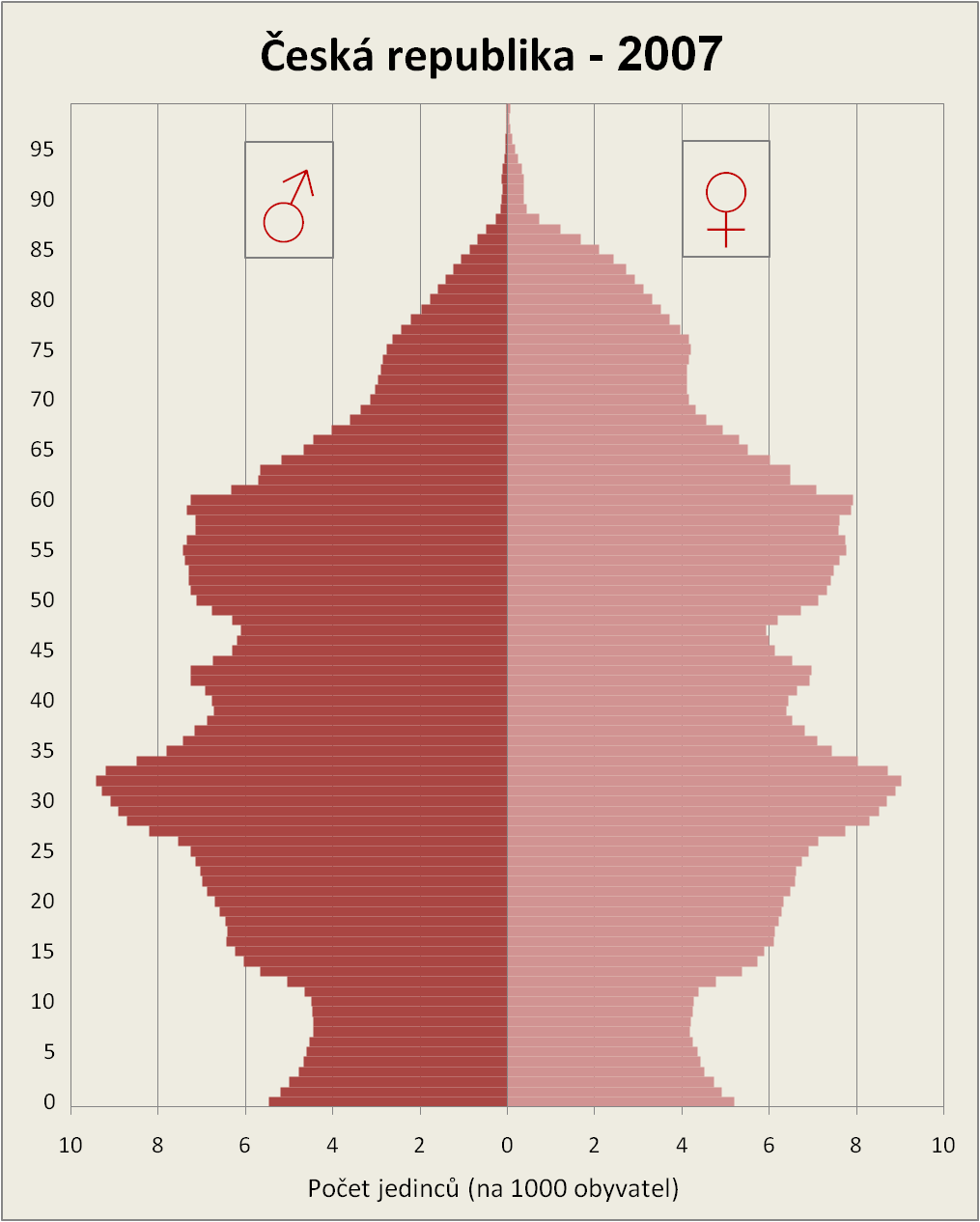
Population pyramid of the Czech Republic in 2007. "Husák's Children" represent the most populous category.

Husák's Children (Czech: Husákovy děti, Slovak: Husákove deti) is a term commonly used for a generation of people born in Czechoslovakia during the baby boom which started in the early 1970s, during the period of "normalization". The generation was named after the President and a long-term Communist leader of Czechoslovakia, Gustáv Husák.

== State pro-population policy in the 1970s ==
The most significant post-war baby boom in Czechoslovakia culminated in 1974. After the events of the Prague Spring in 1968 and subsequent restoration of the conditions prevailing before the reform period, many Czechoslovaks resigned themselves to their fate and became unconcerned with the political situation in the country. In reaction, the Czechoslovak communist régime came with its own version of Goulash Communism, presented in a new concept: the state pro-population policy. The duration of maternity leave was extended, the child allowance increased, and newlyweds were subsidized with attractive state loans. However, the "generous" state policy soon reached its limits. In the late 1970s, the state finance reserves intended for the support of the pro-population policy were limited and the baby boom ended. The influence of the state pro-population policy has been questioned in the past. The population growth began to increase in 1969. The state financial subsidy was approved in 1973 and the baby boom culminated in 1974. After the initial sharp increase, the birth rate began to decline. The roots of the unusual population explosion could be associated with the post-war period rather than the "social engineering" of the communist regime.

== 21st century ==
As of the 00s, the generation of Husák's children represent an important element of Czech society. The 1970s generation of baby boomers caused another significant population increase in the later 2000s. Husák's children also became a target of a marketing and economic "retro-invasion" on the Czech market. After the fall of the Iron Curtain, following a period of fascination with almost any Western product, Czech society gradually turned its attention back to the traditional Czech brands. The marketing campaigns of the companies began to focus on the productive generation and its nostalgia for its childhood. Retro designs of products and brands known in the 1970s and 1980s appeared on the Czech market once again.

The term Husák's children appeared in the words of the song 1970 by the Czech band Chinaski:

Time gallops, time flies, it's hard to bring the past years back,
and so Husák's children have come to Christ years

== See also ==
- Mánička
- Generation X
