= Zvole (Žďár nad Sázavou District) =

- Municipality
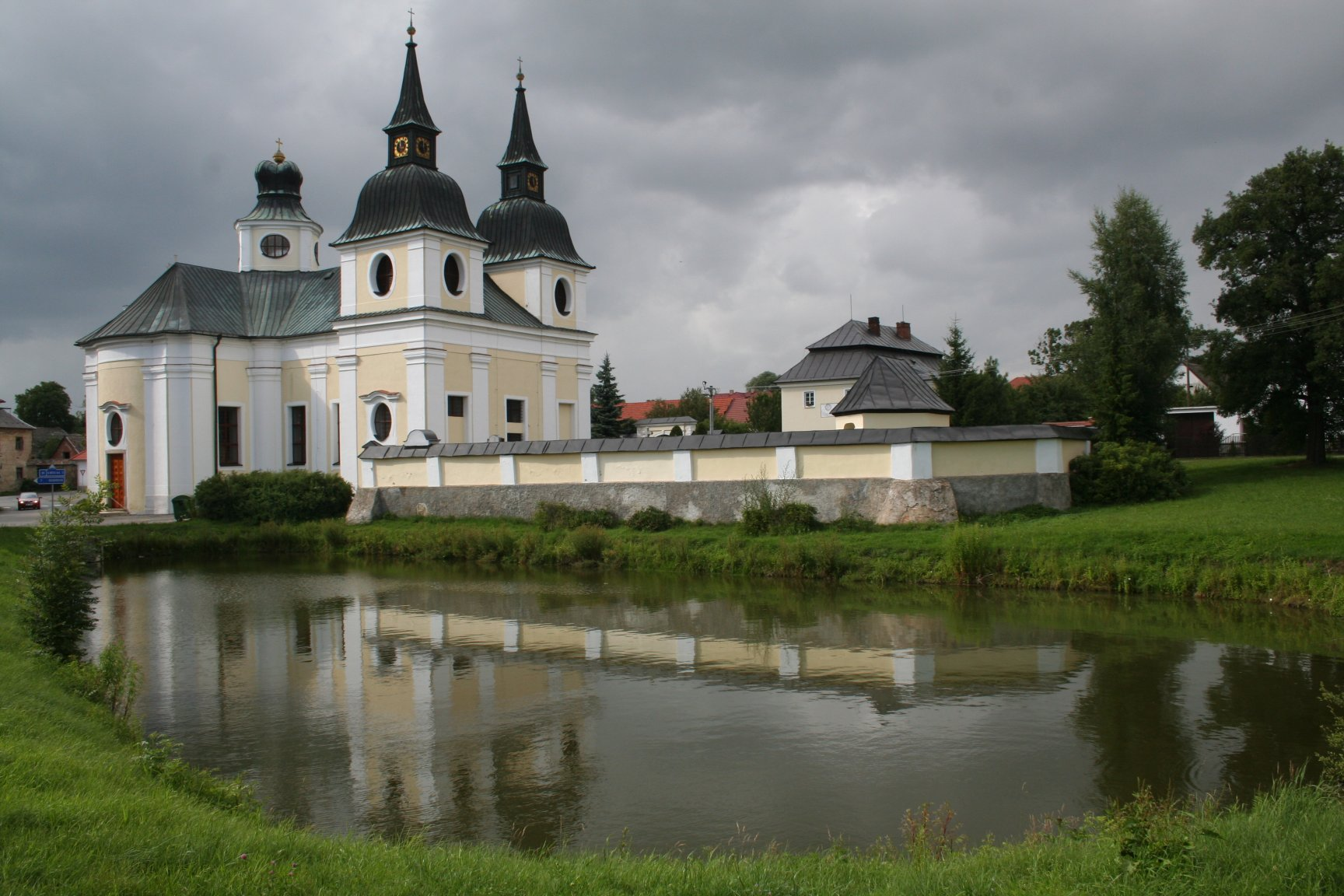
- Church of Saint Wenceslaus

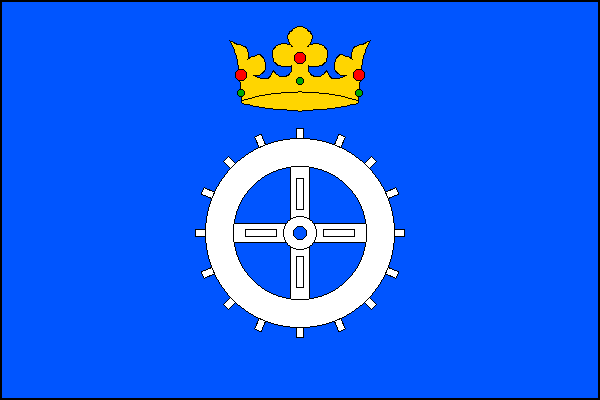
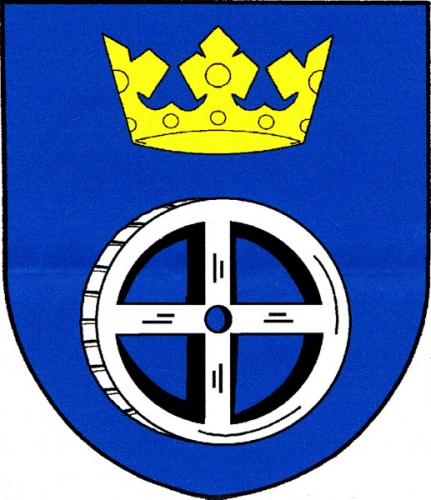
- Flag Coat of arms

- Location in the Czech Republic
- Coordinates: 49°29′40″N 16°10′30″E
- Country: Czech Republic
- Region: Vysočina
- District: Žďár nad Sázavou
- First mentioned: 1349

Area
  - Total: 17.06 km^{2} (6.59 sq mi)
- Elevation: 529 m (1,736 ft)

Population (2026-01-01)
  - Total: 659
  - Density: 38.6/km^{2} (100/sq mi)
- Time zone: UTC+1 (CET)
  - Summer (DST): UTC+2 (CEST)
- Postal codes: 592 51, 592 56
- Website: www.zvolenadpernstejnem.cz

Zvole is a municipality and village in Žďár nad Sázavou District in the Vysočina Region of the Czech Republic. It has about 700 inhabitants.

Zvole lies approximately 19 kilometres (12 mi) south-east of Žďár nad Sázavou, 44 kilometres (27 mi) east of Jihlava, and 142 kilometres (88 mi) south-east of Prague.

== Administrative division ==
Zvole consists of three municipal parts (in brackets population according to the 2021 census):

- Zvole (329)
- Branišov (218)
- Olešínky (99)

== Demographics ==
Historical population
Year	Pop.	±%
1869	1,075	—
1880	1,057	−1.7%
1890	1,077	+1.9%
1900	1,052	−2.3%
1910	1,067	+1.4%
1921	1,042	−2.3%
1930	1,002	−3.8%
1950	754	−24.8%
1961	759	+0.7%
1970	690	−9.1%
1980	678	−1.7%
1991	641	−5.5%
2001	631	−1.6%
2011	604	−4.3%
2021	646	+7.0%
Source: Censuses
