= Šikland =

Coordinates: 49°28′29.53″N 16°10′2.78″E

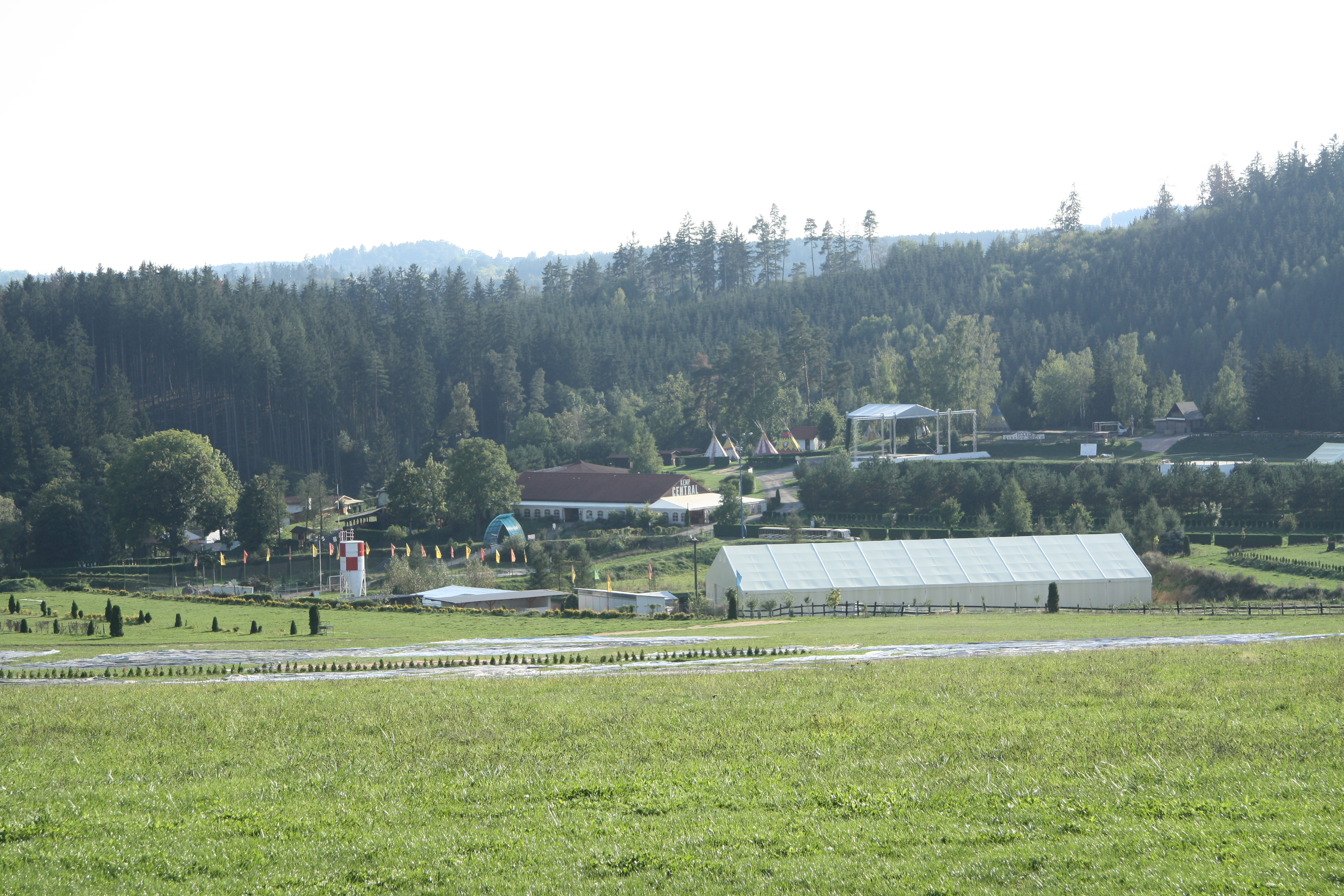
Overview

Šikland (also known as Šiklův mlýn) is the largest outdoor entertainment complex in the Czech Republic. It is located in Zvole in the Vysočina Region, in the Bobrůvka river valley.

The complex offers visitors the beauty of its natural setting, quality accommodation and entertainment, It positions itself as a "paradise for holidays with children" and as a weekend destination.

== History ==
The complex calls itself Šikland in its Czech-language promotional material, a name derived from the name of its founder Libor Šikl. The first reference to this place appeared in 1988. In this time Libor Šikl moved into a house which he inherited from his grandmother. The first country-style was held here a year later and was attended by approximately 50 people. Then Libor Šikl bought the ruins of an old mill and asked for restitution of land that belonged to his parents. A "town" with a Gold Rush and Wild West theme – which they called by the pseudo-English term "Western City" for its Czech audience – was built the next year.

The third Western event lasted the whole week which included Indians. The first newspapers were printed for this occasion and also "dollars" that were used for payment in the "Western City". Since then the "Western City" continued to expand until 1994 when it was completed.

The first rodeo in the Czech Republic was held here in 1998, followed by a night show and stunt riding show on horses. In 2001, the town was expanded for a Mexico-themed section and a hotel was built near the complex.

== Facilities and attractions ==
Today, Šikland offers accommodation in tents, teepees and at the hotel Colorado Grand which offers a solarium and a whirlpool. Sports facilities tennis and volleyball courts, rental of sports equipment and a golf course. The main program includes a western-style show in Wild West.

The most famous attractions in the "Western City" are horseback riding, swimming and "adrenaline entertainment". Visitors can rent period costumes, drive the Union Pacific-themed train or visit the zoo with its horses, bison, muffles, deer, porcupines, wild boars, sheep, and birds. Visitors can also try to ride an electric bull, throw a tomahawk or practice archery.
