= Olga Lounová =

Czech musician, actress, model, and rally driver (born 1981)

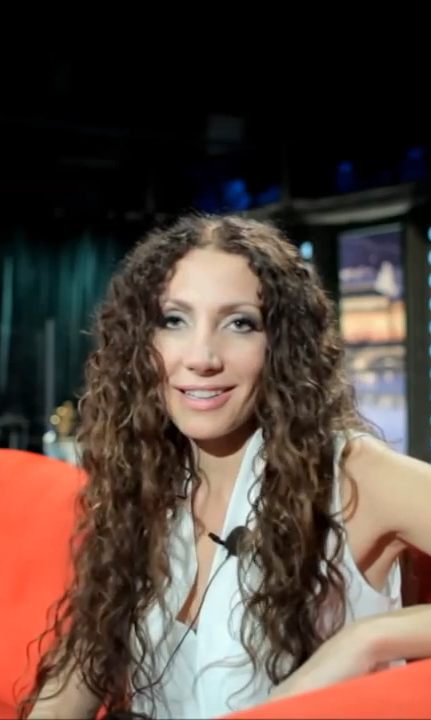
- Olga Lounová, 2014

Background information
- Born: Olga Pytlounová; 7 March 1981 (age 45); Liberec, Czechoslovakia (now Czech Republic)
- Genres: Pop, rock
- Occupations: Singer-songwriter, musician, actress
- Instruments: Vocals, guitar, flute
- Years active: 2010–present
- Website: olgalounova.cz

Olga Lounová (born 7 March 1981) is a Czech singer-songwriter, actress, model and rally driver. She was born and raised in Osečná (Lázně Kundratice) near the town of Liberec. She attended the Jaroslav Ježek Conservatory in Prague and studied Musical Theatre. She later received a master's degree in education.

== Singing career ==
Before launching her career as a solo artist, Lounová was the lead singer and founder of the band Blind Angie and Calathea. She then was the winner of the International Music Competition with the song K výškám ("To Heights") in Latvia and a finalist in the competition in Vitebsk, Belarus.

Lounová began to see success in her singing career in 2010 with the release of the song Láska v housce ("Love in a bun"). The same year, Lounová performed as the opening act for PINK.

In 2011, she released the studio album Rotující nebe ("Rotating sky"). The next year, she launched her concert tour of Optický klam ("Optical illusion"), which was later released as a double CD/DVD.

Lounová released the single Dál za obzor ("Beyond the horizon") with legendary Czech singer, Karel Gott, and her single Brány svaté ("Holy Gates") in 2013.

Between 2015 and 2016, she released several singles, including Stará žena ("Old Lady"), Jsem optimista ("I'm an Optimist"), and English singles, When the Music's On and I Own Ya.

In November 2025, Lounová collaborated with Vojtaano to release the single, Tleskám.

== Acting career ==
Lounová has appeared in several film and television productions. She has logged over 1,800 live performances between her concerts and musical theatre performances.

She appeared in 73 episodes of Czech version of Ugly Betty as Patricie, and numerous episodes of The Mall, Ulice and Vyprávěj.

Lounová starred in the 2010 Czech film Tacho for famous husband and wife team Mirjam and Daniel Landa. Other film appearances include the 2012 release Amputace as Aurora, Román pro ženy as Bludička, and appearances in Blade II, XXX with Vin Diesel, and Ripper.

On stage she has starred in Perfect Wedding, Kat Mydlář, Golem, Dracula, and Carmen. In the late part of 2014, she appeared as Rosie in the premiere of Mamma Mia! in Prague.

== Personal life ==
In November 2022, she gave birth to a baby girl, Arianne, with her boyfriend, hockey coach Jan Kregl.

== Filmography ==
=== Television ===
- Rally s Olgou (2012)
- The Mall (2012) Prima TV
- Ulice (2011—2012) Nova TV
- Vyprávěj (2009—2012) Česka Televize
- Ugly Betty (2008—2009) Prima TV

=== Film ===
- Amputace (2012) "Aurora”
- Tacho (2010) "Lucie”
- Roman Pro Zeny (2006) "Bludička”
- Blade II (2002) "Prostitute”
- XXX (Vin Diesel) 2002 "waitress”
- Ripper (2001)

=== Theatre ===
- Mamma Mia! (2014) "Rosie”
- Perfect Wedding (2013)
- Kat Mydlař (2011—2013)
- Golem (2009—2011)
- Dracula (2009)
- Dobre Placena Prochazka (2009)
- Carmen (2008) "Carmen”
- Olza (2008)
- Malované Na Skle (2008)

== Discography ==
=== Albums ===
- Chuť Svobody ("The Taste of Freedom") (2015) Studio Album
- Optický klam ("Optical Illusion") (2013) Double CD/DVD
- Rotující nebe ("Rotating Sky") (2011) Studio Album

=== Singles ===
- "Dark water" (2020) Single
- "When The Music's On" (2016) Single
- "Jsem optimista" (2015) Single
- "Brány svaté" (2013) Single
- "Dál za obzor" (2012) Hit-Single-duet with Karel Gott
