= Michal Tučný =

Czech singer and songwriter (1947–1995)

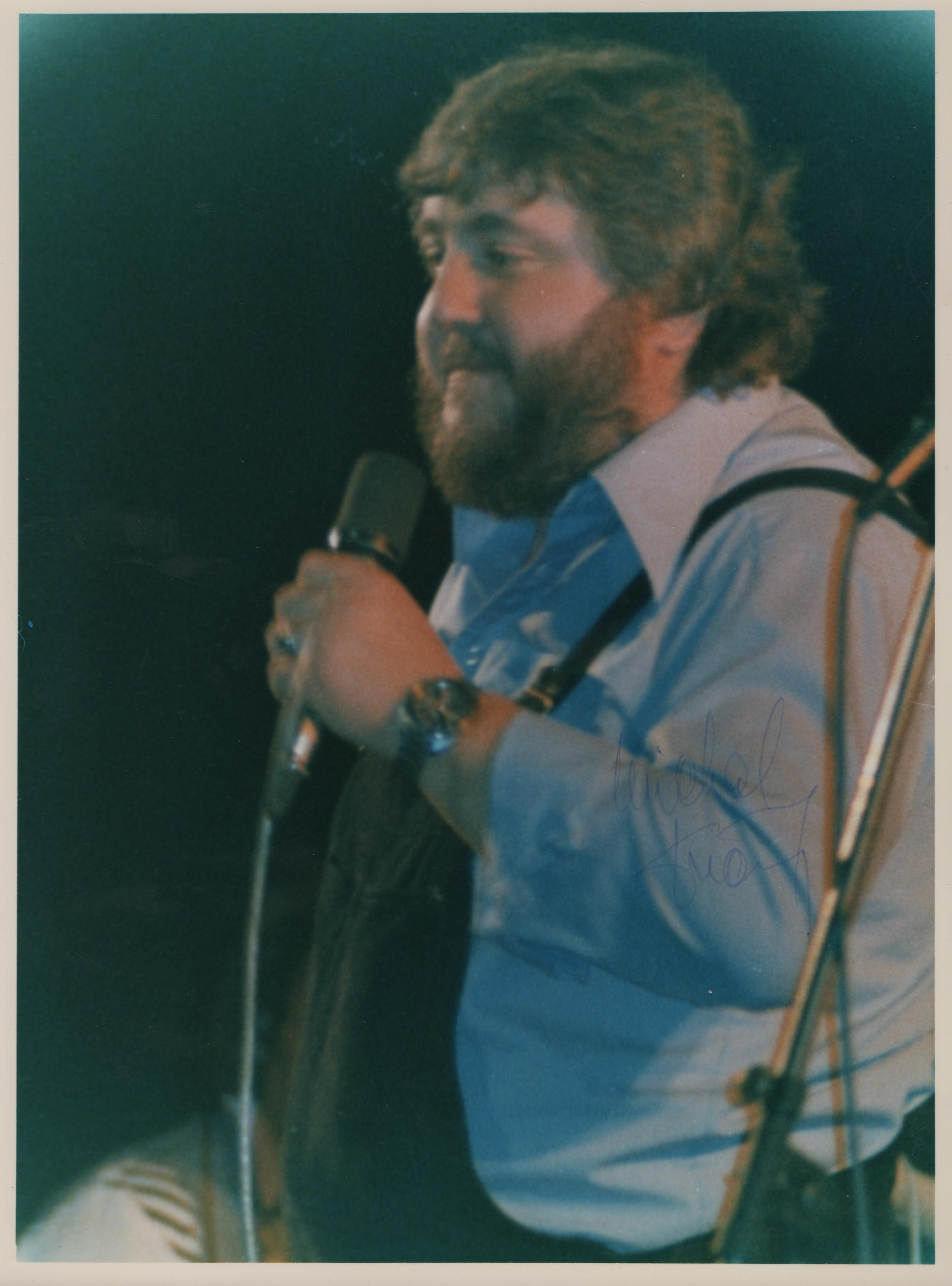
- Michal Tučný in Žamberk, 1980

Background information
- Born: 11 January 1947; Prague, Czechoslovakia
- Origin: Czechoslovakia
- Died: 10 March 1995 (aged 48) Czech Republic
- Genre: Country
- Occupations: Singer; songwriter
- Instruments: Vocals; guitar; piano
- Label: Supraphon

Michal Tučný (11 January 1947 – 10 March 1995) was a Czech singer and songwriter. He is considered one of the most popular Czech country singers and he is regarded as a legend of the Czech country music (he was often referred to as the king of the genre). His music remains popular in Czechia years after his death.

== Biography ==
Michal Tučný was born in Prague, Czechoslovakia, in 1947. He played piano as a child. In 1965, he passed the matura exam at a business school. By profession, he was a qualified shopkeeper (which he mentions in several of his songs). His whole life he was a devote fan of SK Slavia Prague. He began his musical career at the age of 14 in Dixieland. In 1967, he participated in the first Czech country music festival. At his beginnings, he played and sang with several bands, including "Rangers". In 1969, he became a soloist of the group "Greenhorns".

Tučný made his first television appearance in 1970, and soon became a household name. In 1974, he joined the group "Fešáci", and in 1980, he created his own band "Tučňáci" (meaning "Penguins", but relating to his surname, which means "fat"). In 1980s, he collaborated with Rattlesnake Annie, making album named Poslední kovboj ("The Last Cowboy"). In November 1990, he gave a concert in Valdice men's prison (similarly to Johnny Cash at Folsom Prison).

=== Death and legacy ===
Through his life, Tučný struggled with poor health, even worsened by his obesity, and underwent many surgeries. Tučný died 10 March 1995 at age 48 of liver cancer. He is buried in Hoštice in the South Bohemian Region, where he lived in his last years; its village square bears his name. His grave is marked by a stone in the shape of a cowboy hat. The country festival named Stodola Michala Tučného ("Michal Tučný's Barn") has been held here annually for many years.

Tučný's impact has lasted beyond his death. More than 20 years after his death, his music remained popular amongst Czech country fans. In 2019, the folk rock group Jelen recorded a tribute album to him, titled Půlnoční vlak Michala Tučného. A memorial concert was planned in Prague's O2 Arena on 17 January 2026, to commemorate thirty years since his death.

== Notable songs ==
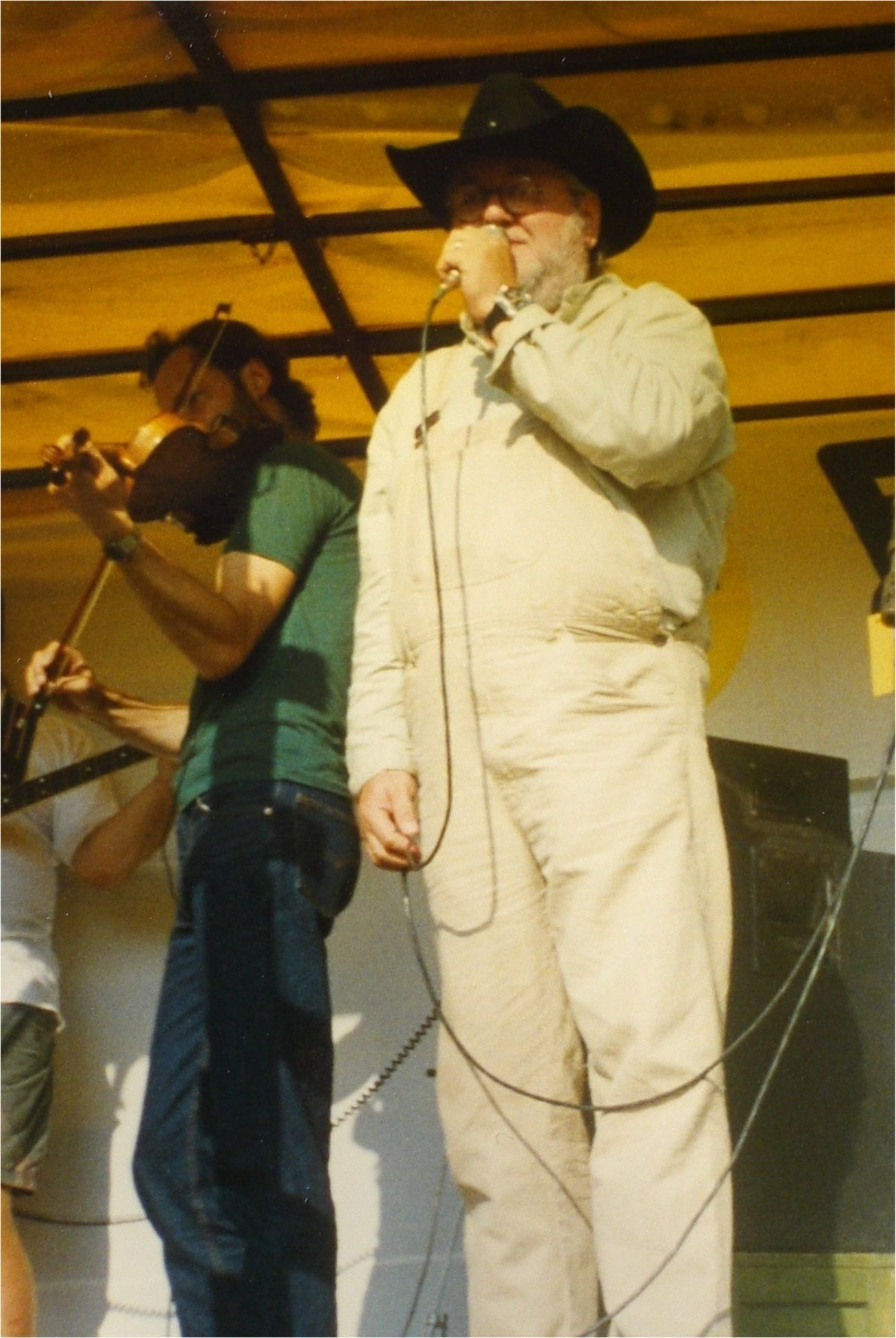
Michal Tučný at gold panning in Otava, 1994

- Všichni jsou už v Mexiku (original song: They All Went to Mexico)
- Blízko Little Big Hornu (with Greenhorns, original song: Jim Bridger)
- Báječná ženská (original song: Good Hearted Woman)
- Pověste ho vejš (covered by Rattlesnake Annie as Hang her higher)
- Prodavač (with Fešáci, adaptation of The Auctioneer)

His other songs include:

- Blues Folsomské věznice (with Greenhorns) (original song: Folsom Prison Blues)
- Tam u nebeských bran
- Poslední kovboj
- Koukám, jak celá země vstává
- Snídaně v trávě (original song: Sea of Heartbreak)
- Ještě dlouhou cestu mám
- Nádraží (with band Fešáci)
- Boty z kůže toulavejch psů
- Jak chcete žít bez koní
- El paso (with Greenhorns, original song: El Paso)
- Feleena z El pasa (with Greenhorns, original song: Feleena (From El Paso))
- Chtěl bych být medvídkem (with Zdeněk Rytíř, original song: The Teddy Bear Song)
- Cesty toulavý (original song: On the Road Again)
- Vlak v 0,5 (with Greenhorns)
- Hromskej den (with Tomáš Linka & Greenhorns)
- Já tajně cvičím (with Fešáci)
- Šlapej dál (with Greenhorns)

== Discography ==
Michal Tučný's discography consists of more than 30 albums and compilations. He made 8 albums with Greenhorns/Zelenáči, 3 with Fešáci and another 11 with Tučňáci or solo. A number of his compilations was published posthumously.

== Filmography ==
Year	Title	Role	Notes
1980	Já ubohá děvečka aneb Jsou mlynáři jsou chlapíci		TV movie
