= Jelen (band) =

Czech folk rock band

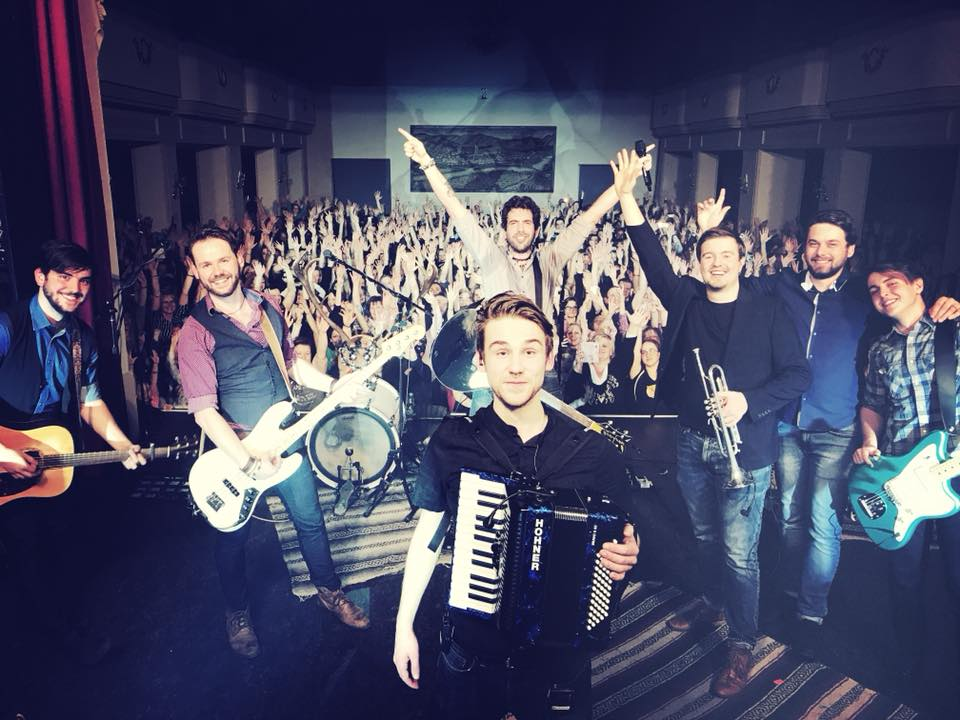
- Jelen in 2018

Background information
- Origin: Prague, Czech Republic
- Genre: Folk rock
- Years active: 2012–present
- Label: Universal
- Award: Anděl Award (2014, 2016)
- Members: Jindra Polák; Víťa Polák; Martin Kasal; Ondra Málek; Tomáš Málek; Josef Málek; Jan-Vojtěch Rek; Saša Smutný
- Past members: Janek Kovářík; Ludvík Kulich
- Website: jelenmusic.cz

Jelen is a Czech folk rock band founded in 2012 by guitarist, singer, and harmonica player Jindra Polák. It additionally consists of Víťa Polák, Martin Kasal, Ondra Málek, Tomáš Málek, Josef Málek, Jan-Vojtěch Rek, and Saša Smutný. The band won the Anděl Award for Discovery of the Year in 2014 for their debut album, Světlo ve tmě, and Group of the Year in 2016 for their second record, Vlčí Srdce. They have released five studio albums, one EP, one live record, and one compilation. Their third studio album, issued in 2019, is a tribute to the Czech country singer-songwriter Michal Tučný, titled Půlnoční vlak Michala Tučného.

== Band members ==
Current

- Jindra Polák – vocals, guitars, harmonica
- Martin "Kása" Kasal – violin, piano, vocals
- Ondra Málek – bass, drums, vocals
- Tomas Málek – guitar
- Honza Rek – banjo, electric guitar, washboard
- Josef Málek – accordion, vocals
- Saša Smutný – trumpet
- Vit Polák – drums

Past

- Janek Kovářík – accordion
- Ludvík Kulich – guitar

== Discography ==
Studio albums

- Světlo ve tmě (2014)
- Vlčí Srdce (2016)
- Půlnoční vlak Michala Tučného (2019)
- Věci & sny (2021)
- Všechno bude dobrý (2023)

EPs

- Magdaléna (2013)

Live albums

- Živě v Lucerně (2017)

Compilations

- To Nejlepší – Prvních 10 Let (2024)

Singles

- "Tančíme Spolu" Kateřina Marie Tichá feat. Jelen (2013)
- "Magdaléna" (2014)
- "Co bylo dál" with Jana Kirschner (2014)
- "Jelen" (2015)
- "Vlčí srdce" (2016)
- "Klidná jako voda" (2016)
- "Domů" (2017)
- "Mars a venuše" with Debbi (2018)
- "Spím V Obilí" with Míša Tučná (2018)
- "Jediný Co Chci" (2020)
- "Ještě jednu noc" (2021)
- "Někde kolem" (2021)
- "Touha a pláč" (2023)
- "Všudezdejší" (2024)
- "Bílé klávesy (Živě v O2 aréně)" with Adéla Orlová (2026)
- "Toulaví zpěváci" (2026)
