= Petr Lexa =

Czech musician and actor (born 1991)

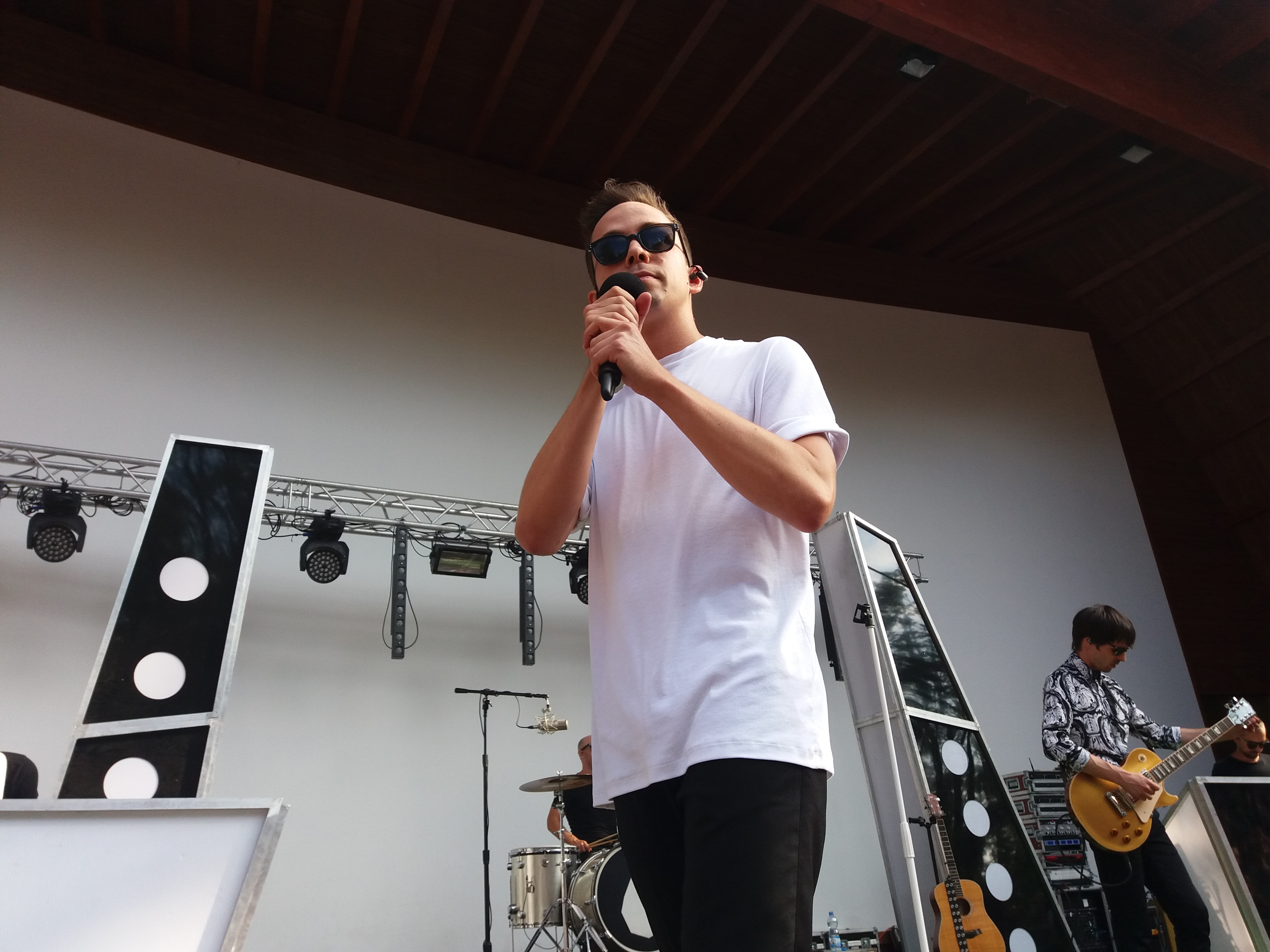
- Lexa performing with Slza in 2018

Background information
- Born: 5 June 1991 (age 34); České Budějovice, Czechia
- Genres: Pop
- Occupations: Singer; YouTuber; actor
- Instrument: Vocals
- Member of: Slza

Petr Lexa (born 5 June 1991) is a Czech singer and one half of the pop duo Slza, formed in 2014. He is also active on YouTube under the nickname Hoggy and has appeared in the television series Přístav.

== Career ==
Lexa's interest in theatre began in primary school. He began taking acting lessons at a young age but decided to devote more time to music in 2009, when he recorded his first cover song and released it on YouTube, under the name Hoggy. In 2015, he was named Male Blogger of the Year.

He has participated in the reality television singing competitions The Voice Česko Slovensko and SuperStar.

In 2014, he joined guitarist Lukáš Bundil to form the pop duo Slza. They have since released four studio albums: Katarze (2015), Holomráz (2017), 3 (2020), and Monodrama (2023).

== Discography ==
with Slza

- Katarze (2015)
- Holomráz (2017)
- 3 (2020)
- Monodrama (2023)
