= Xindl X =

Czech musician and screenwriter (born 1979)

Ondřej Ládek
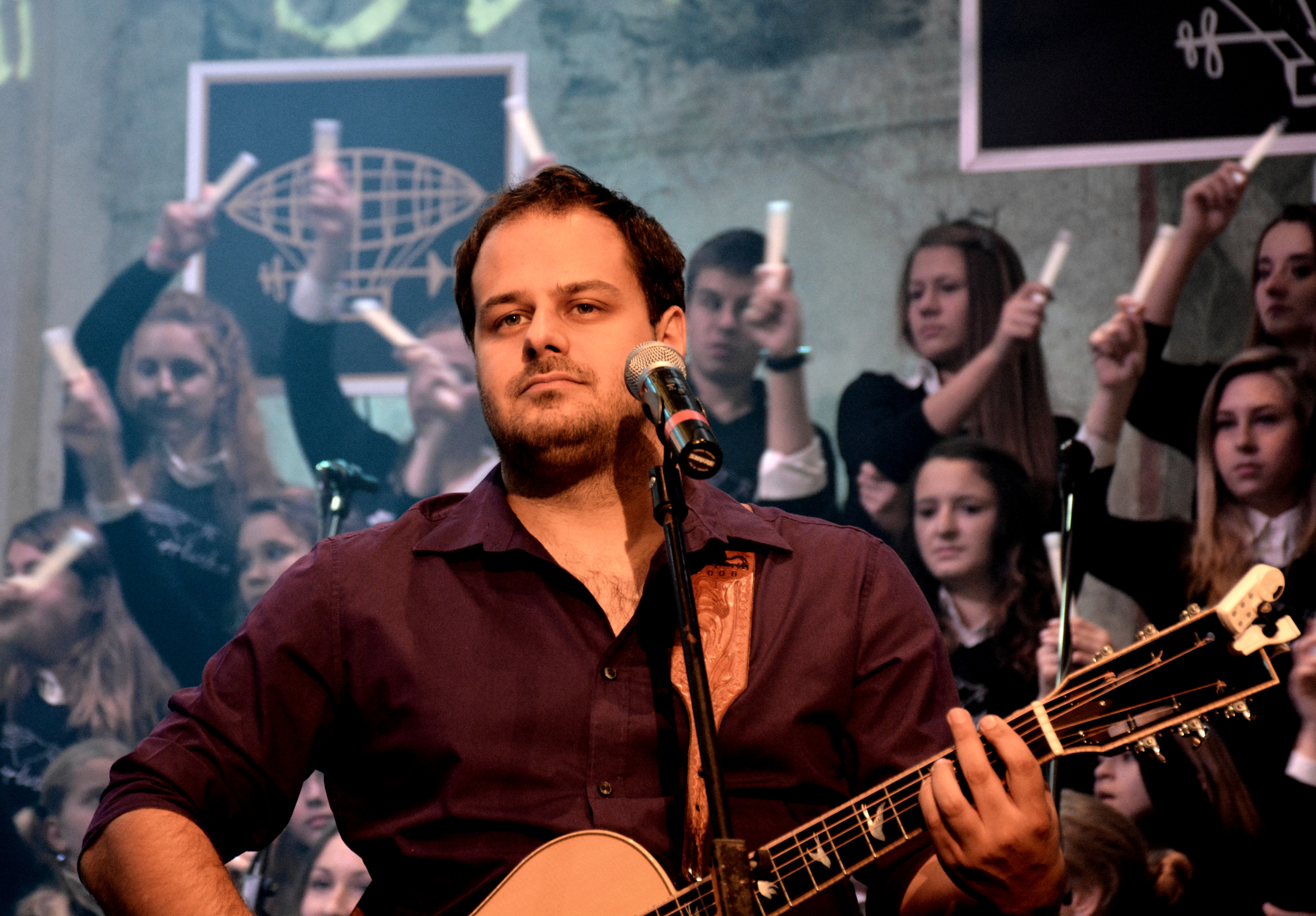
- Xindl X performing in 2014

Background information
- Also known as: Xindl X
- Born: 16 August 1979 (age 47); Prague, Czechoslovakia
- Genres: Pop; folk; hip hop; jazz; blues
- Occupations: Musician; composer; screenwriter
- Instruments: Guitar; vocals
- Years active: 2008–present
- Website: xindlx.cz

Ondřej Ládek (born 16 August 1979), known professionally as Xindl X, is a Czech musician, composer, and screenwriter. His music combines pop, folk, hip hop, jazz, and blues. As of 2026, he has released seven studio albums, one live record, and one compilation.

== Career ==
With Julius Ševčík, Ládek wrote the screenplay for the 2005 film Restart. In 2008, he released his debut album, under the name Xindl X, titled Návod ke čtení manuálu, which was nominated for an Anděl Award in the category Best Folk & Country Album. The first single, "Anděl", was nominated for two 2009 Anděl Awards, in the categories Composition of the Year and Video of the Year.

In 2010, Ládek released Praxe relativity, which included the single "Láska v housce", a duet with Olga Lounová. The song was again nominated for Composition of the Year and Video of the Year, at the 2010 Anděl Awards, and Ládek received a nomination for Male Singer of the Year. The same year, he won the Biggest Gainer prize at the Český slavík awards.

In 2011, Ládek issued his first compilation album, Xpívánky, and in 2012, he published his next studio record, Láska. His song "V blbým věku", from his fourth album, Čecháček Made, was nominated for Composition of the Year and Video of the Year at the 2014 Anděl Awards. After the release of his fifth album, Kvadratura záchranného kruhu, Ládek was nominated as Male Singer of the Year at the 2016 Anděl Awards. His next album, Sexy Exity, came out in 2018, followed by his seventh, Terapie, in 2021.

Ládek has written screenplays for 16 episodes of the TV series Comeback. His music and lyrics can be heard in the 2013 Jakub Sommer musical film Raportér.

== Personal life ==
In 2012, Ládek married his girlfriend Monika Hujslová; they have two children together.

== Discography ==
Studio albums

- Návod ke čtení manuálu (2008)
- Praxe relativity (2010)
- Láska (2012)
- Čecháček Made (2014)
- Kvadratura záchranného kruhu (2016)
- Sexy Exity (2018)
- Terapie (album) (2021)
- Fén X (2024)

Live albums

- G2 Acoustic Stage (2014)

Compilations

- Xpívánky (2011)

Singles

- "Anděl" (2008)
- "Dysgrafik" (2008)
- "Láska v housce" (feat. Olga Lounová) (2010)
- "Řiditel autobusu" (feat. The Tap Tap, Vojtěch Dyk, and Dan Bárta) (2011)
- "Stědrej večer nastal" (2012)
- "Casio" (2012)
- "Barbína" (2014)
- "Čecháček a Totáče" (2014)
- "V blbým věku" (2014)
- "Cudzinka v tvojej zemi" (feat. Mirka Miškechová) (2014)
- "Na vodě" (2016)
- "Popelka" (2016)
- "Mýval" (2017)

- "Věčně nevěrná feat. Sabina Křováková" (2018)
- "Byznys" (2018)
- "Dřevo" (2018)
- "Nejlepší zvukař je playback" (feat Petr Luftner) (2018)
- "Alenka" (2019)
- "Volnoběh" (2019)
- "Roušky" (2020)
- "Něco je ve vzduchu" (2020)
- "Růžový brejle" (2020)
- "Má chata, můj hrad" (2021)
- "SebeLoveSong" (2021)
- "Terapie" (2021)
- "Pubert'ák" (2025)
- "Dovolená" (2026)
